= 27th Separate Guards Motor Rifle Brigade =

535th Rifle Regiment (1940 — 1957) 404th Guards Motorised Rifle Regiment (1957 — 1983) 27th Guards Sevastopol Red Banner Motor Rifle Brigade "60th Anniversary of the USSR" (1983 — present)
- Russian: 27-я отдельная гвардейская мотострелковая Севастопольская Краснознамённая бригада имени 60-летия СССР
- Brigade Emblem
- Active: 1940 — present
- Country: Soviet Union (1940–1991); Russia (1991–present)
- Branch: Soviet Army; Russian Ground Forces
- Type: Mechanized infantry
- Size: Brigade
- Part of: 1st Guards Tank Army, Moscow Military District
- Garrison/HQ: Mosrentgen, Novomoskovsky, Moscow; MUN 61899
- Nickname: 27-я
- Patron: Saint Michael
- Motto: Служить здесь — почёт и большая награда! Да здравствует 27-я бригада!!!
- March: Солнце встало над Сапун-горою!
- Engagements: World War II; 1991 Soviet coup d'état attempt 1993 Russian constitutional crisis First Chechen War; Second Chechen War; Russian military intervention in the Syrian civil war Russian invasion of Ukraine
- Decorations: Order of the Red Banner
- Honorifics: Guards; Sevastopol

Commanders
- Current commander: Colonel (Guards) Sergey Igorevich Safonov

The 27th Guards Sevastopol Red Banner Motor Rifle Brigade "60th Anniversary of the USSR" (Russian: 27-я отдельная гвардейская мотострелковая Севастопольская Краснознамённая бригада имени 60-летия СССР, romanized: 27-ya otdel'naya gvardeyskaya motostrelkovaya Sevastopol'skaya Krasnozamyonaya brigada imeni 60-letiya SSSR) is a tactical formation of the Russian Ground Forces. Its Military Unit Number (V/Ch) is 61899. It is part of 1st Guards Tank Army of the Moscow Military District, stationed in Mosrentgen, Novomoskovsky Administrative Okrug of Moscow.

== History ==
The brigade traces its origins to the 535th Rifle Regiment, formed in Chuguev, Kharkov Oblast, Ukraine, in July 1940. From August 8, 1941, to September 14, 1941, the regiment, part of the 127th Rifle Division, participated in battles near Yelnya. On September 18, 1941, for the courage and valor of its personnel, the regiment and the remainder of the division became a Guards unit, the division becoming the 2nd Guards Rifle Division.

Atamyrat Niyazov, the father of the first post-Soviet President of Turkmenistan Saparmurat Niyazov, reportedly volunteered to go to the front with the 535th Rifle Regiment during World War II. According to post-Soviet official Turkmen sources, surrounding his son's personality cult, he was killed on 24 December 1942 during the Battle of the Caucasus.

In 1947, a new branch of troops appeared in the Soviet Ground Forces - motorized rifle and mechanized troops. At the same time, the regiment was renamed the 6th Guards Motorized Rifle Sevastopol Red Banner Regiment. Initially, the troops received American armoured personnel carriers and Studebaker trucks. During the first half of 1947, the regiment was fully equipped with wheeled and tracked vehicles and weapons. A vehicle fleet, technical and repair bases, and fuel and lubricants warehouses began to be created. By the summer, the Soviet General Staff had developed a draft of new Combat and Field Manuals for the Ground Forces, more in line with the post-war era.

The unit served as the 404th Guards Motorised Rifle Regiment (404th GMRR) from 1957 until the early 1980s, and in 1982 was given the honorific title "named for the 60th anniversary of the Union of Soviet Socialist Republics", celebrated that year.

After many years of service as a regiment, the brigade was activated when on 1 June 1983, in Teplyy Stan, Moscow Oblast, the 27th Guards Motor Rifle Brigade was established from the former 404th GMRR. It was briefly transferred to the Soviet Border Troops in 1990–91 before reverting to army control.

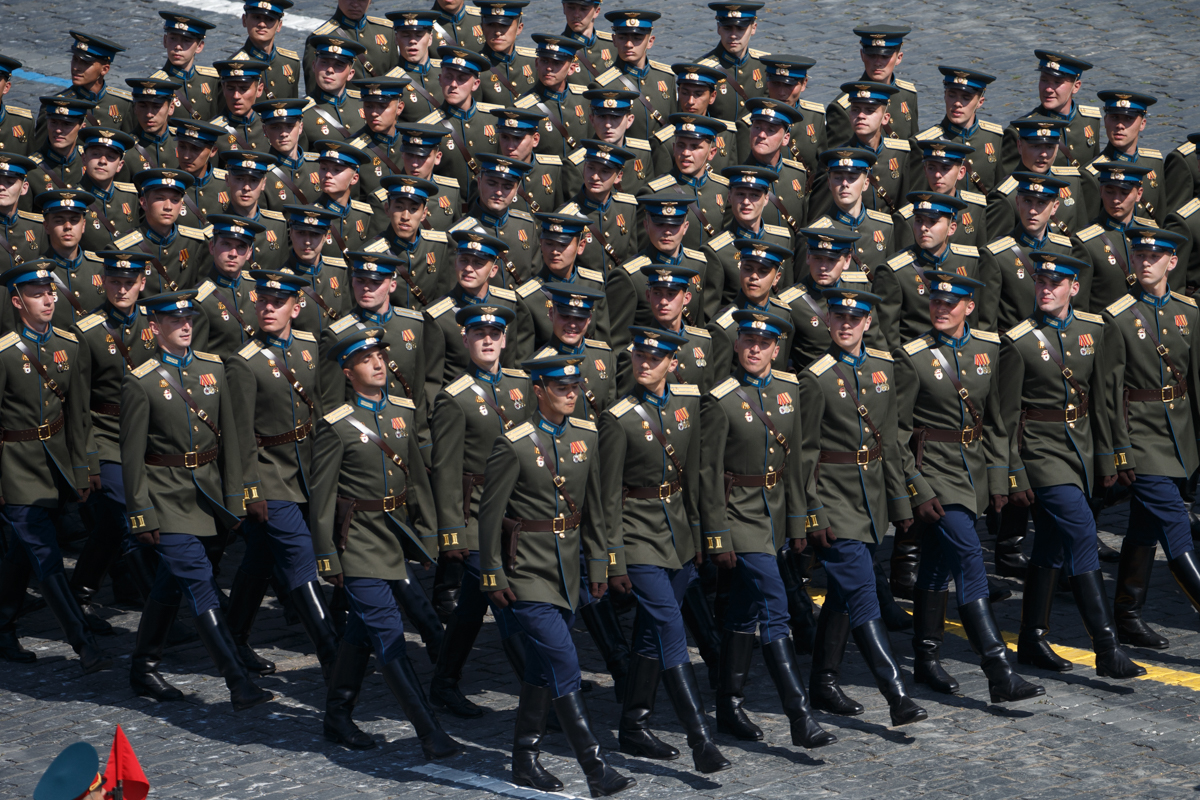
Troops of the brigade dressed in the uniforms of the Soviet Air Forces during the 2020 Moscow Victory Day Parade.

It is now part of the reformed 1st Guards Tank Army after 2014. Sutyagin and Bronk wrote in 2017 that the brigade had a regime security function.

According to Radio Liberty, the 27th Brigade experienced heavy losses near the city of Sumy during the first days of the Russian invasion of Ukraine. The brigade crossed into Ukraine through Kursk Oblast and Belgorod Oblast. According to the testimony of Russian prisoners-of-war from the unit, they were tasked with establishing checkpoints around the city of Sumy, checking passing vehicles for weapons, and ensuring the unimpeded passage of Russian military vehicles. A number of soldiers from the 27th Brigade were captured by Ukrainian territorial defense forces.

After the Russian withdrawal from northern Ukraine, the 27th Brigade was redeployed to the area of Izium, where it remained until a September 2022 Ukrainian counteroffensive across Kharkiv Oblast, which forced it to retreat.

On 25 September 2022, during the brigade's retreat after the fall of Izium, the 27th Brigade's commanding officer, Colonel Sergey Igorevich Safonov, and an officer from the 96th Reconnaissance Brigade reportedly stabbed an elderly woman and shot her husband respectively, killing both.

After the retreat, the 27th Brigade took up positions in the Svatove–Kreminna area in the northwestern Luhansk Oblast. Units of the brigade's 2nd Battalion were reportedly positioned in the village of Novoselivske, Luhansk Oblast in November 2022, and retreated to Svatove after an armoured assault on the village by Ukrainian forces.

In April 2025, it was reported that the 27th Brigade was operating near Zapadne in the Kharkiv region. Elements of the 27th Brigade reportedly took part in the June capture of Myrove and Kindrashivka, as well as the recapture of Kindrashivka in August.

The 27th Brigade reportedly continued operating on the Kupiansk front into October 2025; the brigade was among the units credited by the Russian ministry of defense with the supposed capture of Kupiansk the next month.

== Composition ==
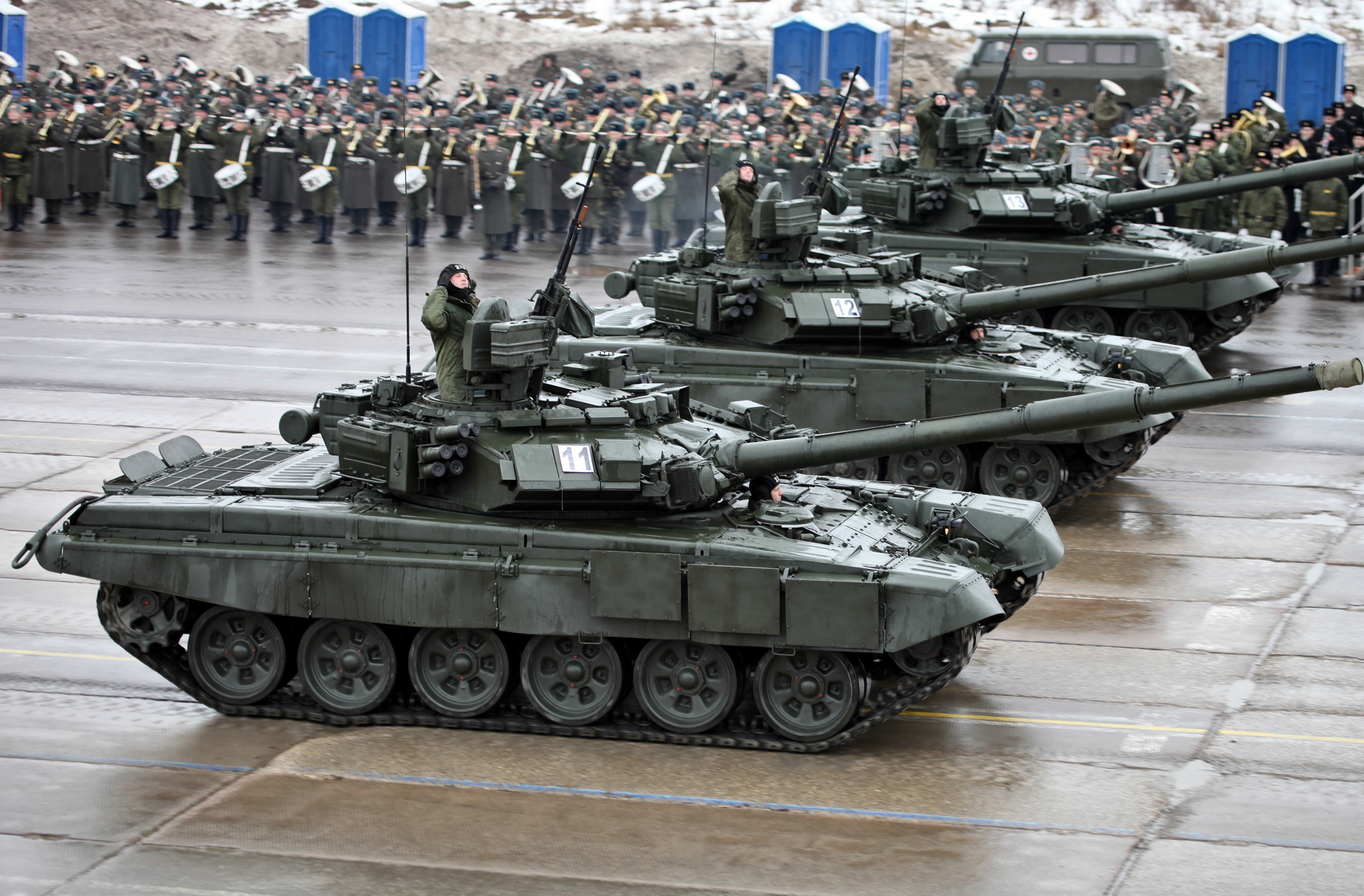
T 90A Tanks from the brigade in the Alabino.

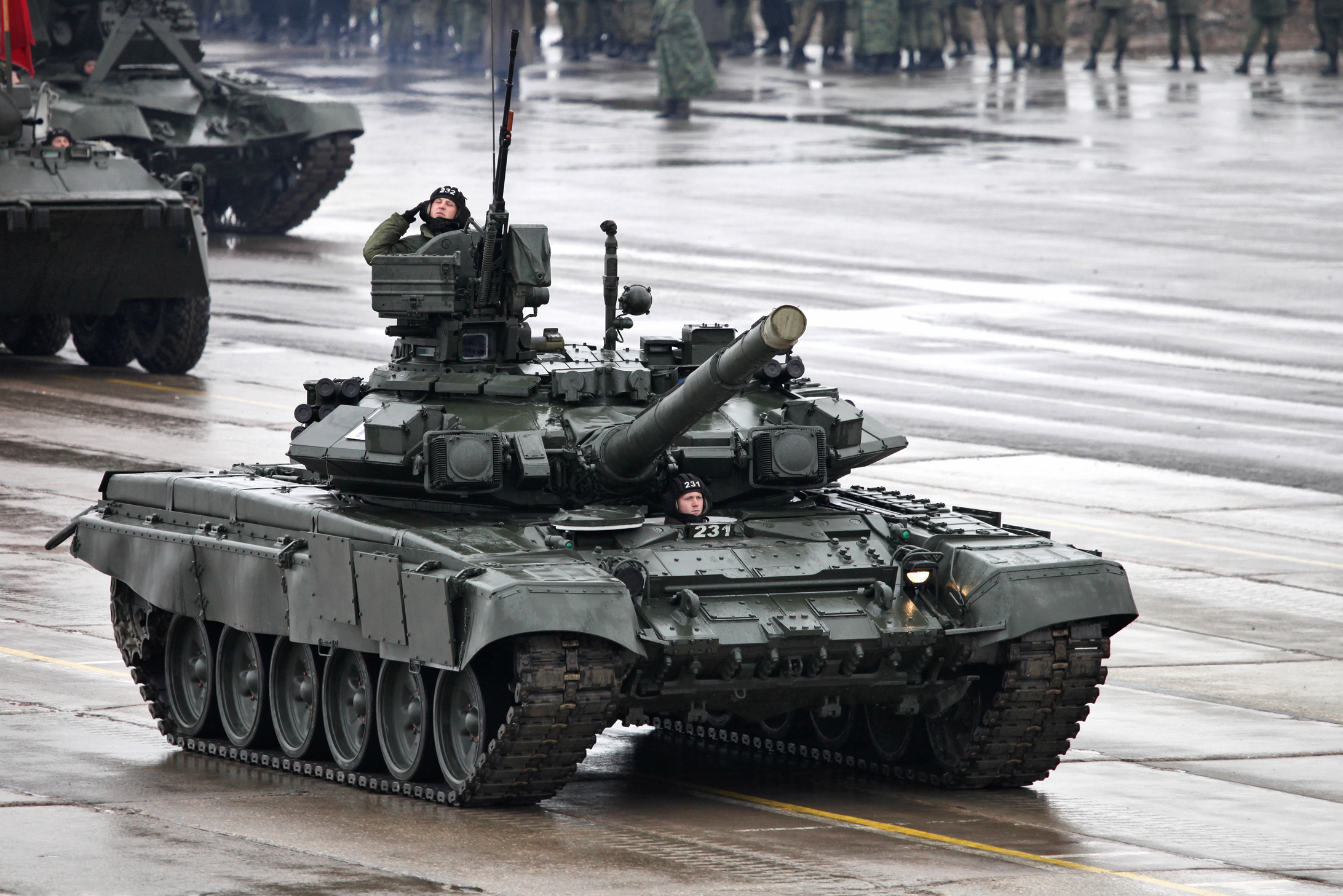

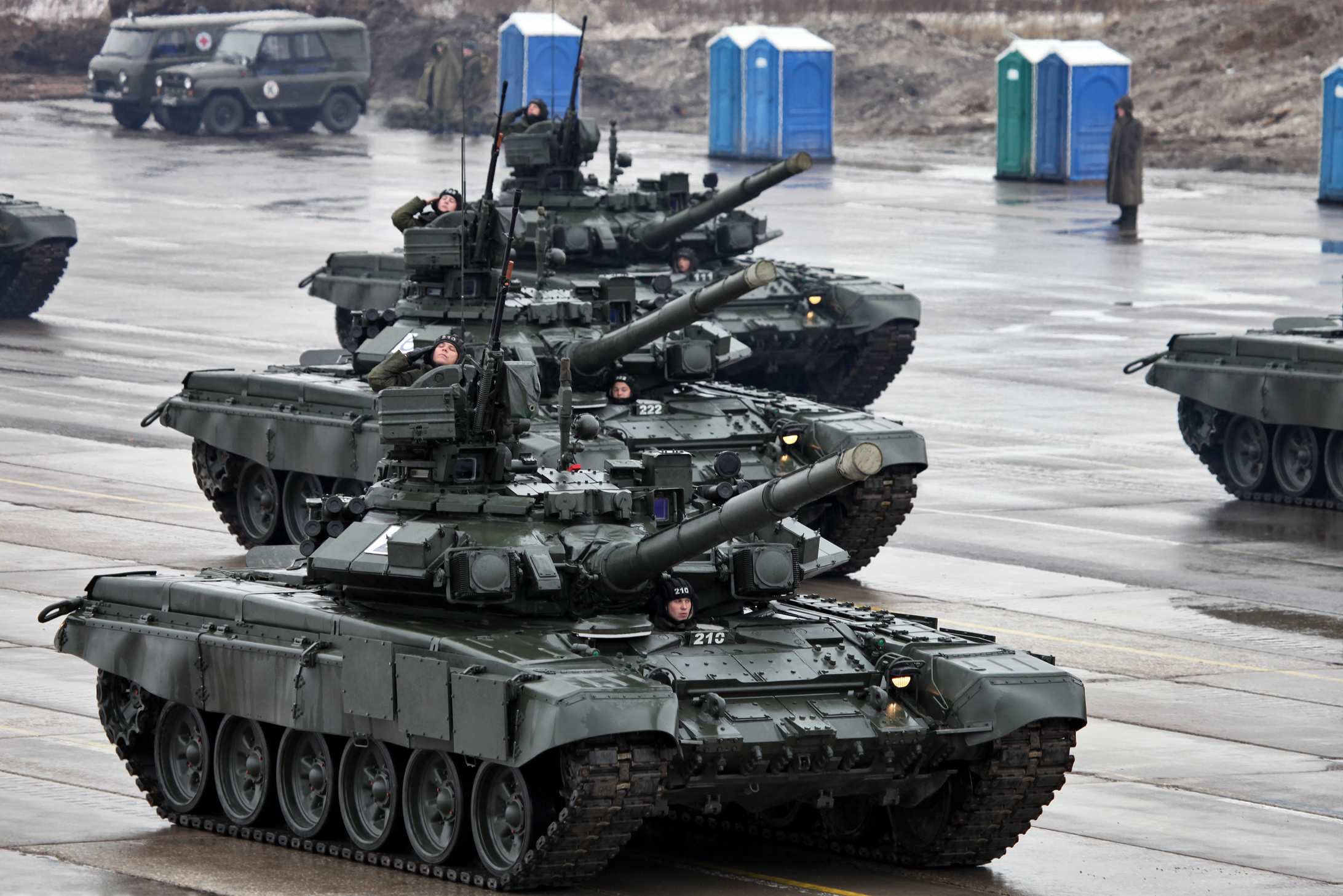

- Directorate
- 1st Motorized Rifle Battalion
- 2nd Motorized Rifle Battalion
- 3rd Motorized Rifle Battalion
- Tank Battalion
- Self-Propelled Artillery Battalion
- Rocket Artillery Battalion
- Anti-Aircraft Missile and Artillery Battalion
- Intelligence Company
- Rifle Company
- Signals Battalion
- Battalion of Material Support
- Repair and Restoration Company
- Engineering Company
- Commandant's Company
- NBC Company
- Medical Company
- Battery Management and Artillery Intelligence
- Command and Radar Reconnaissance Platoon
- Management Platoon
- Platoon of Instructors
- Simulators Platoon
- Polygon
- Brigade Band
- Storm-Z Convict Assault Detachment

=== Band ===
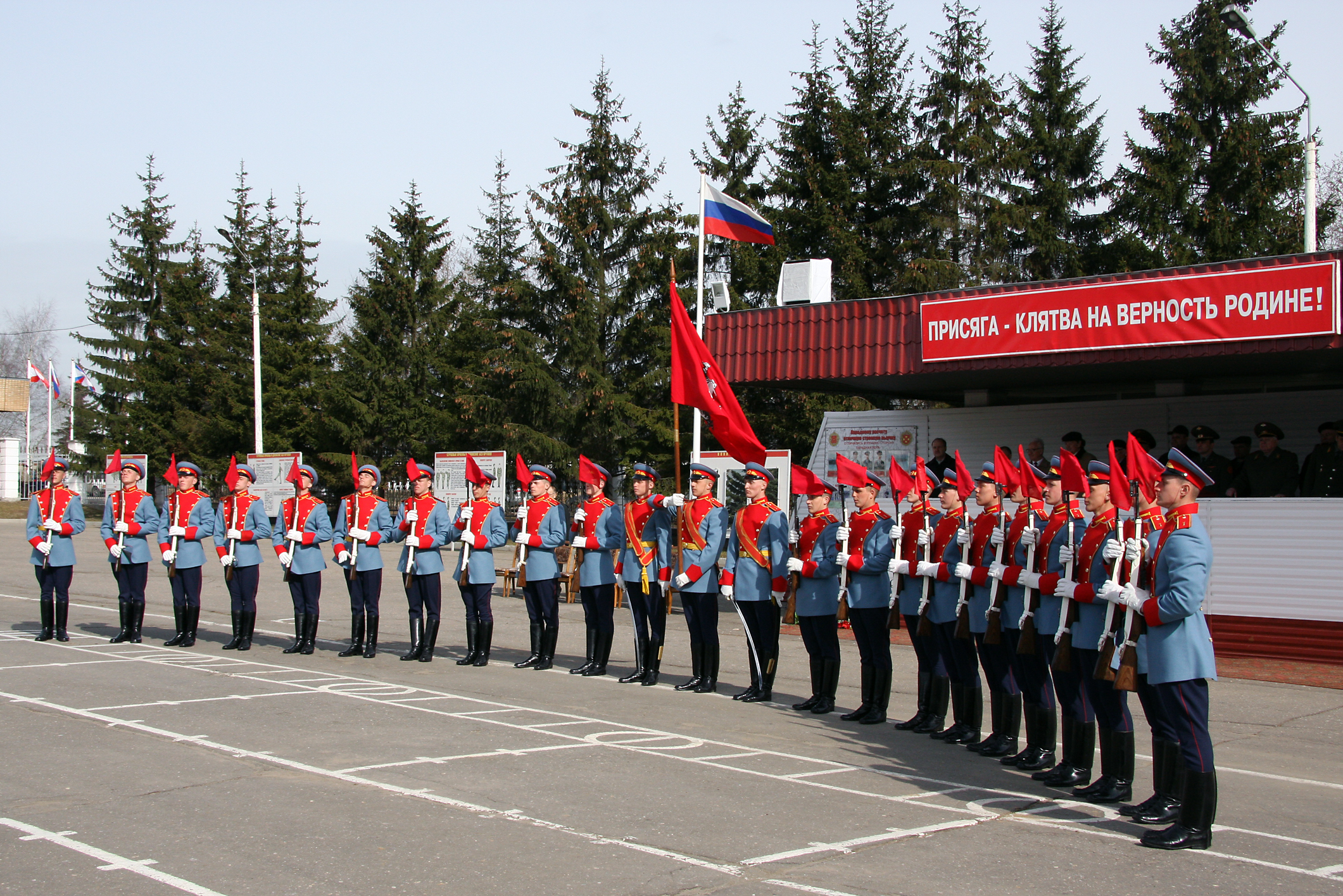
The brigade drill team on conscript day.

The Military Band (currently led by Lieutenant Alexei Bozhedomov) is a specialized unit group in the brigade. It is deployed in the village of Mosrentgen in Moscow. It conducts active cultural accompaniment to all events of the brigade and at cultural events in Moscow. It is a regular participant in the Moscow Victory Day Parade on Red Square. The band is participated in the Spasskaya Tower Military Music Festival and Tattoo from 2017 to 2019.

== Brigade commanders ==
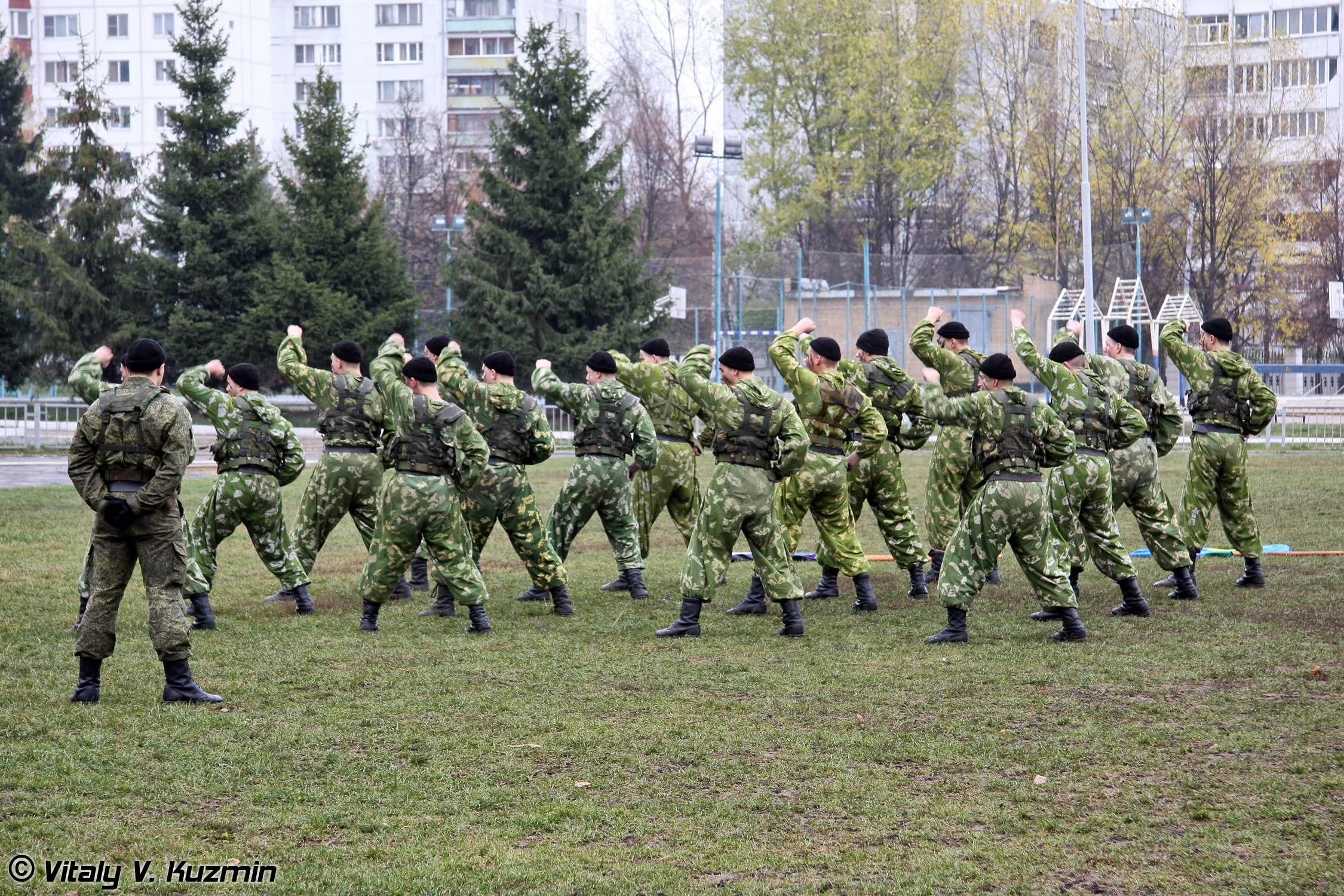
A demonstration of the intelligence unit.

- Valentin Kryukov (June 1983 — August 1984)
- Gennady Andreev (August 1984 — August 1987)
- Pyotr Medvedev (August 1987 — July 1988)
- Boris Polyakov (July 1988 — June 1990)
- Alexander Yegorov (June 1990 — July 1993)
- Aleksandr Nikolayevich Denisov (July 1993 — February 1995)
- Sergey Generalov (February 1995 — April 1997)
- Alexey Samolkin (April 1997 — June 1999)
- Ivan Buvaltsev (July 1999 — July 2001)
- Alexander Kuzhilin (August 2001 — September 2003)
- Dmitry Yashin (November 2003 — October 2006)
- Aleksandr Chaiko (November 2006 — November 2007)
- Gennady Obukhov (December 2007 — December 2009)
- Andrey Trifonov (December 2009 — January 2012)
- Vladimir Yeremeyev (February 2012 — December 2013)
- Aleksandr Sanchik (December 2013 — December 2014)
- Sergey Goryachev (December 2014 — November 2015)
- Dmitry Yakovlevich Aksyonov (November 2015 — July 2021)
- Sergey Igorevich Safonov (August 2021 — October 2022)
- Yaroslav Gladkikh (October 2022 — July 2023)
- Pavel Brovko (July 2023 — present)

== Heroes of Russia ==
- Lieutenant Colonel of the Guards Vladimir Belov
- Lieutenant of the Guards Alexander Solomatin

== Gallery ==
 Conscript Day at the 27th Separate Guards Motor Rifle Brigade 2011.

                T-80BV

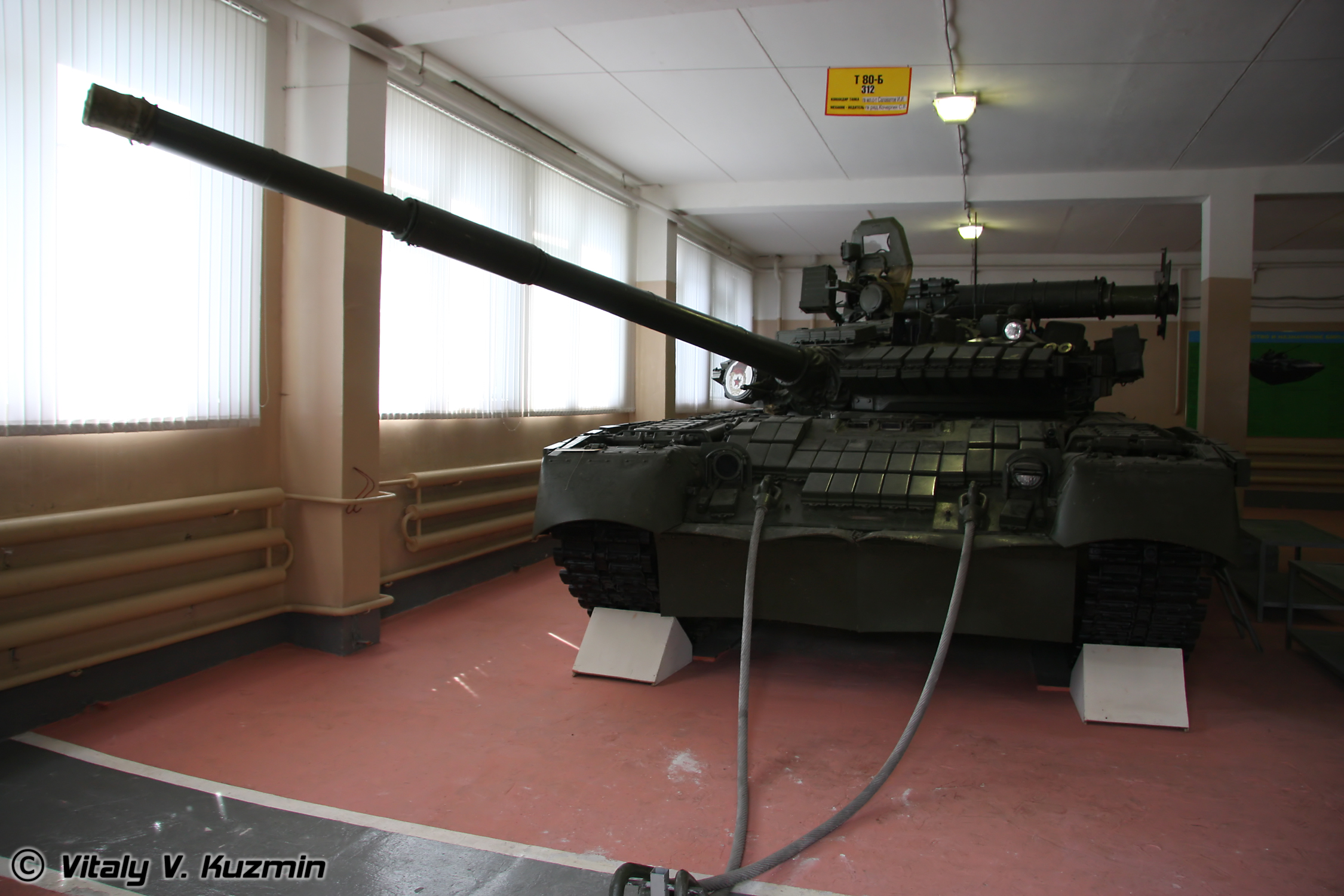

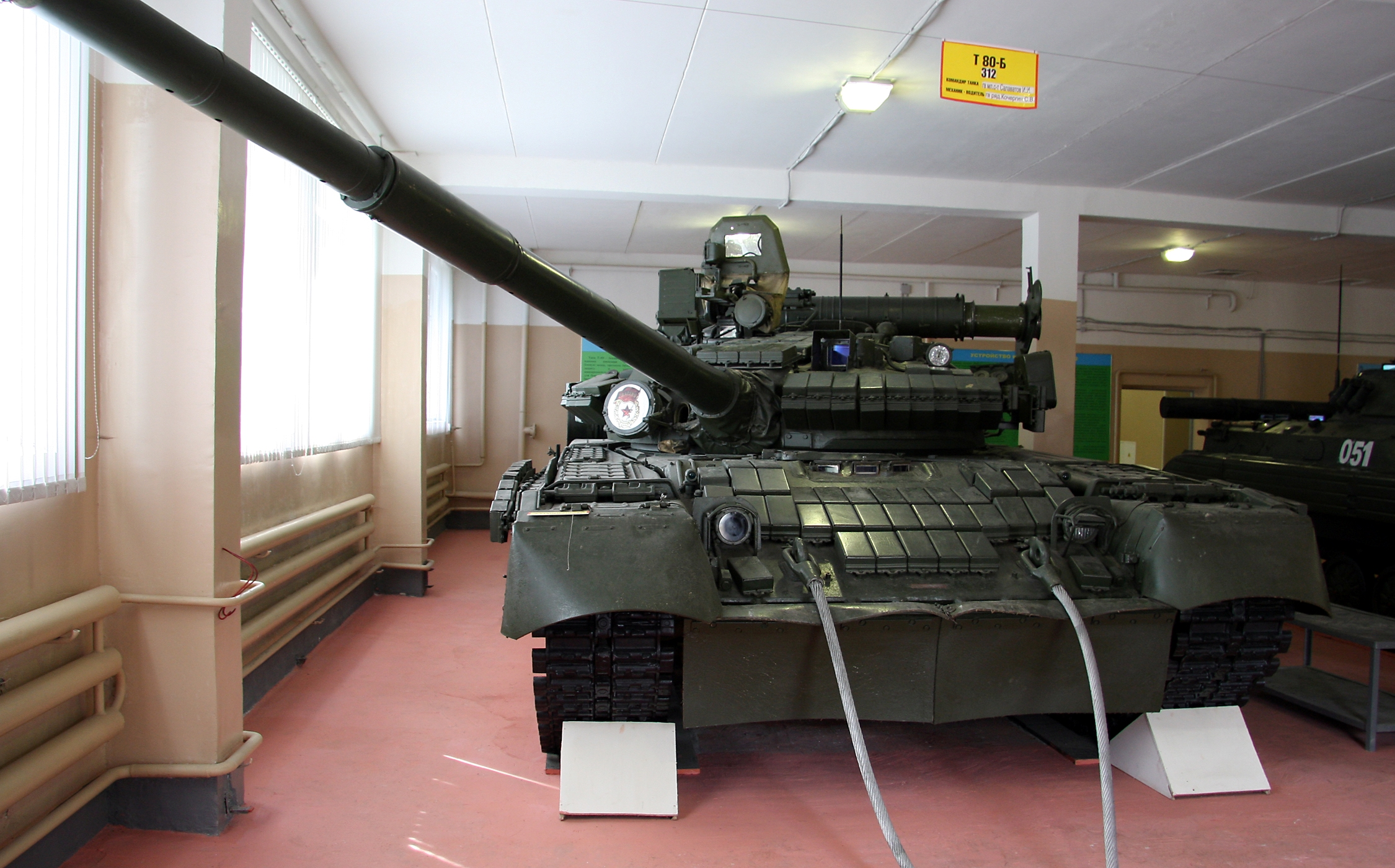

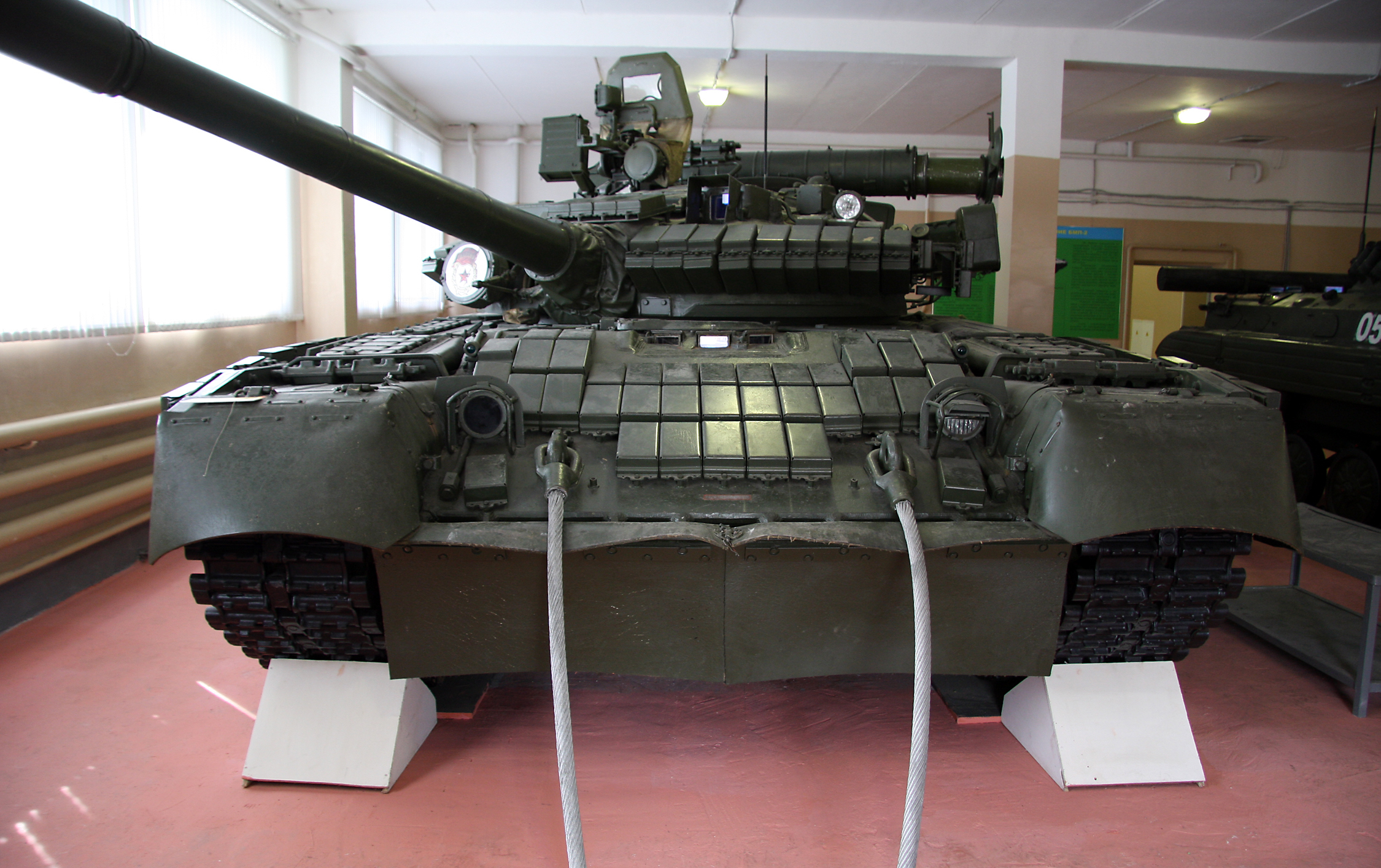

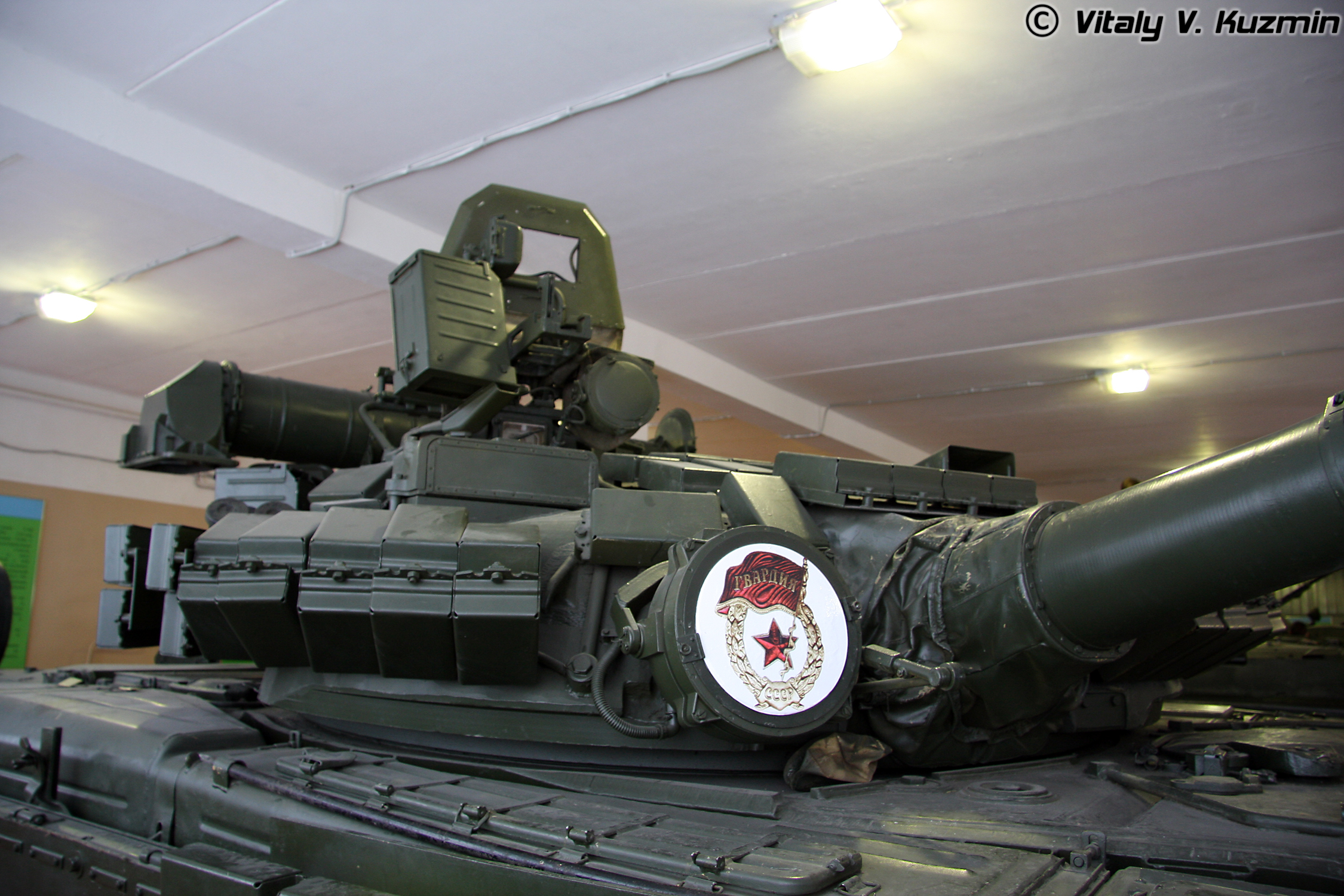

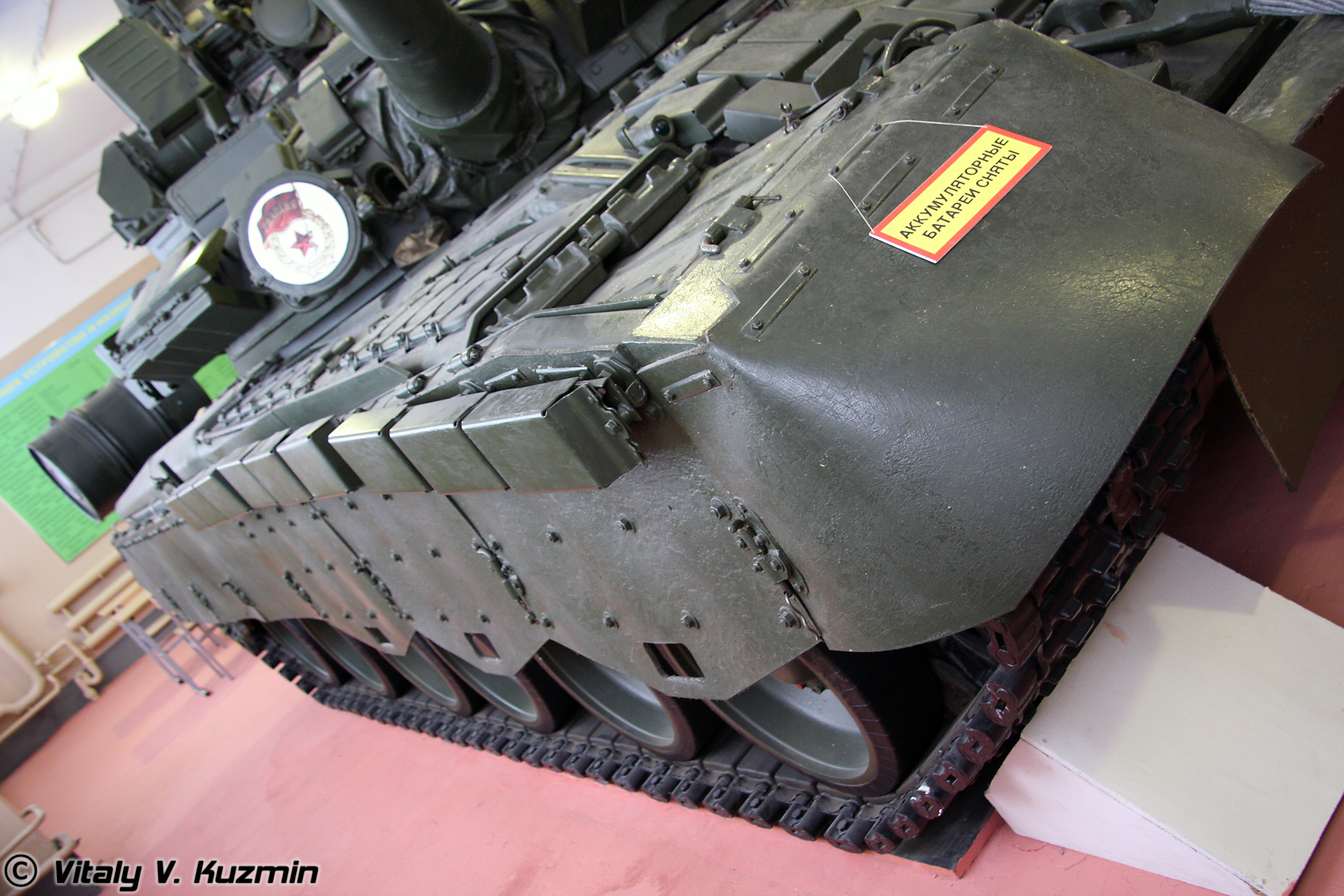

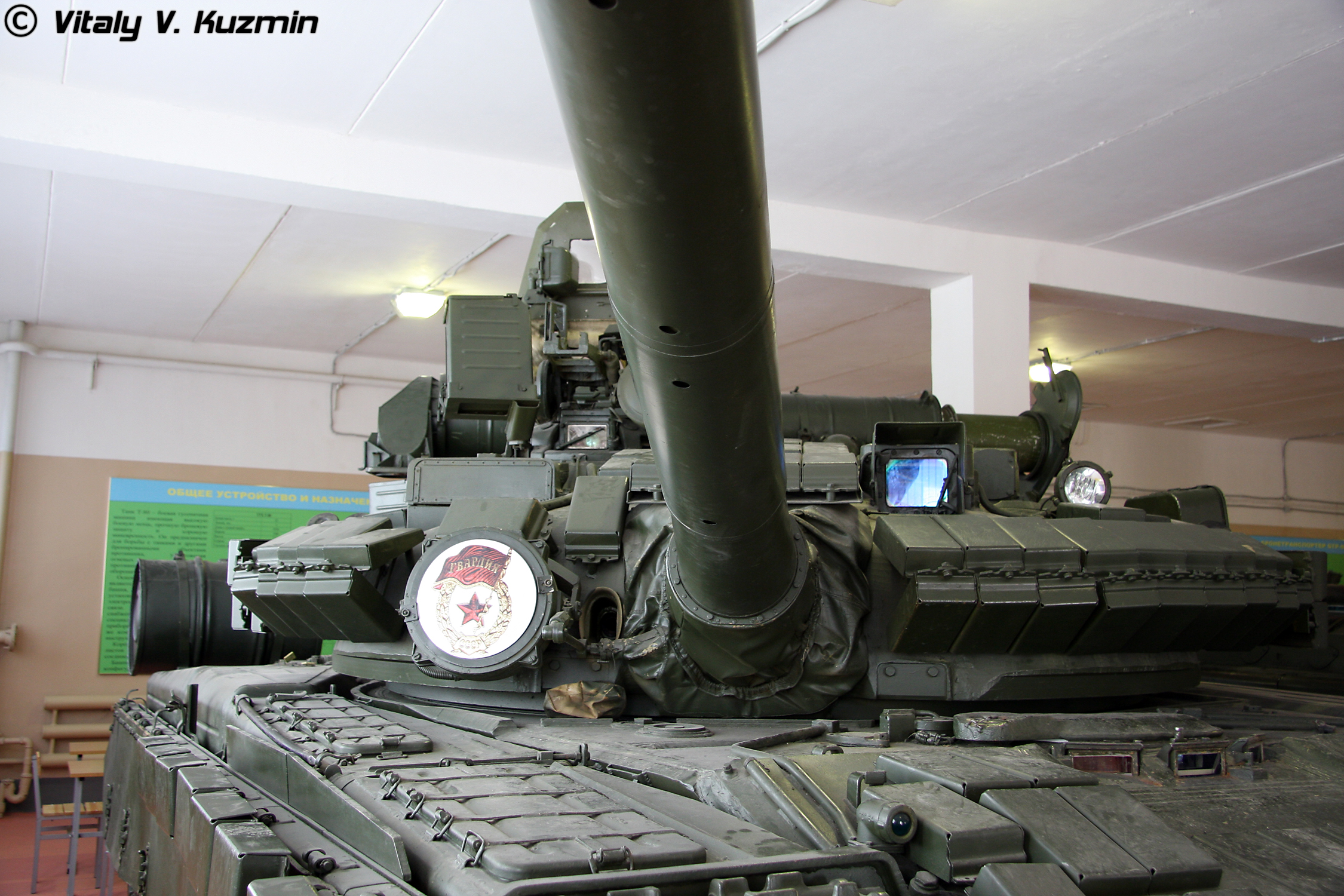

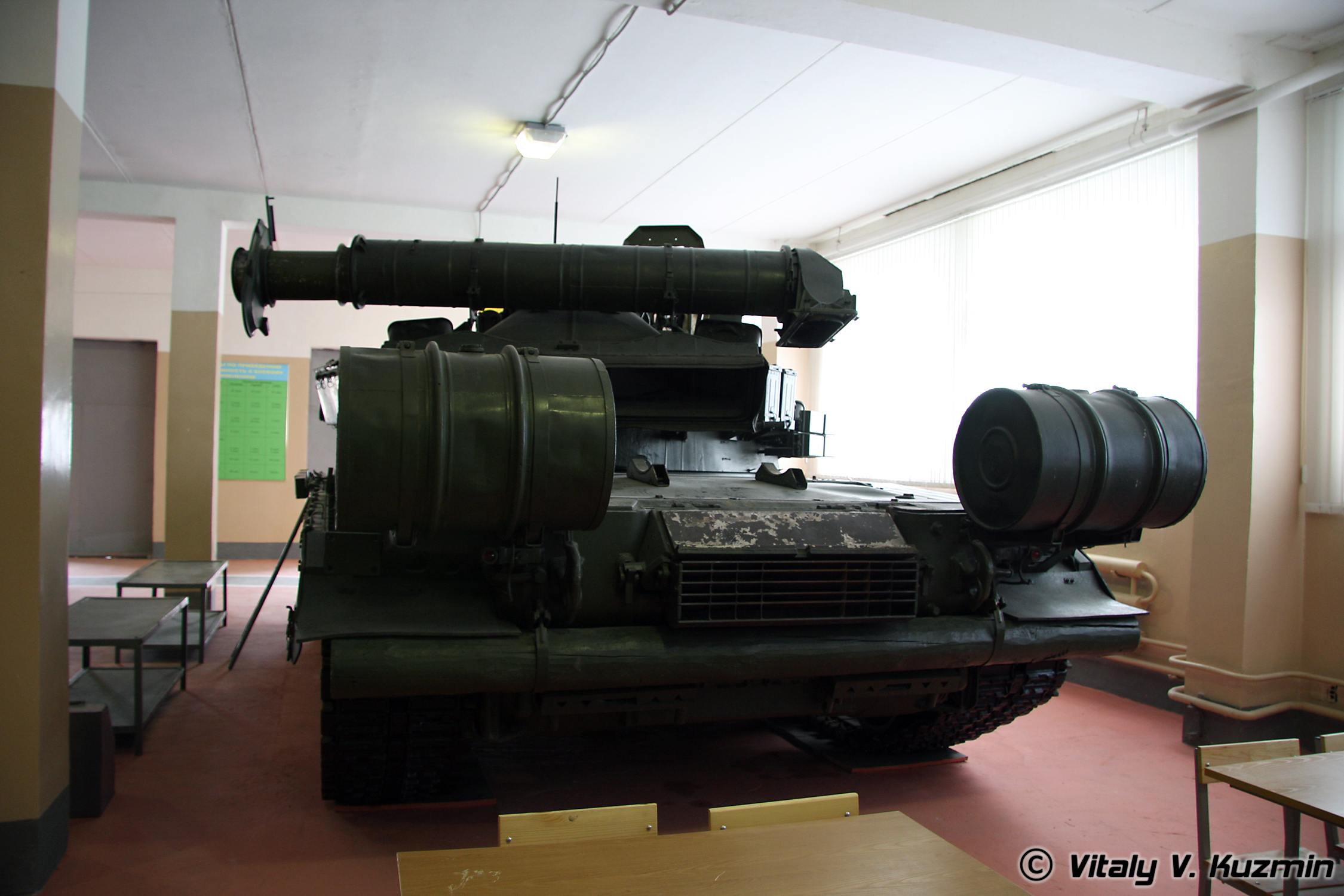

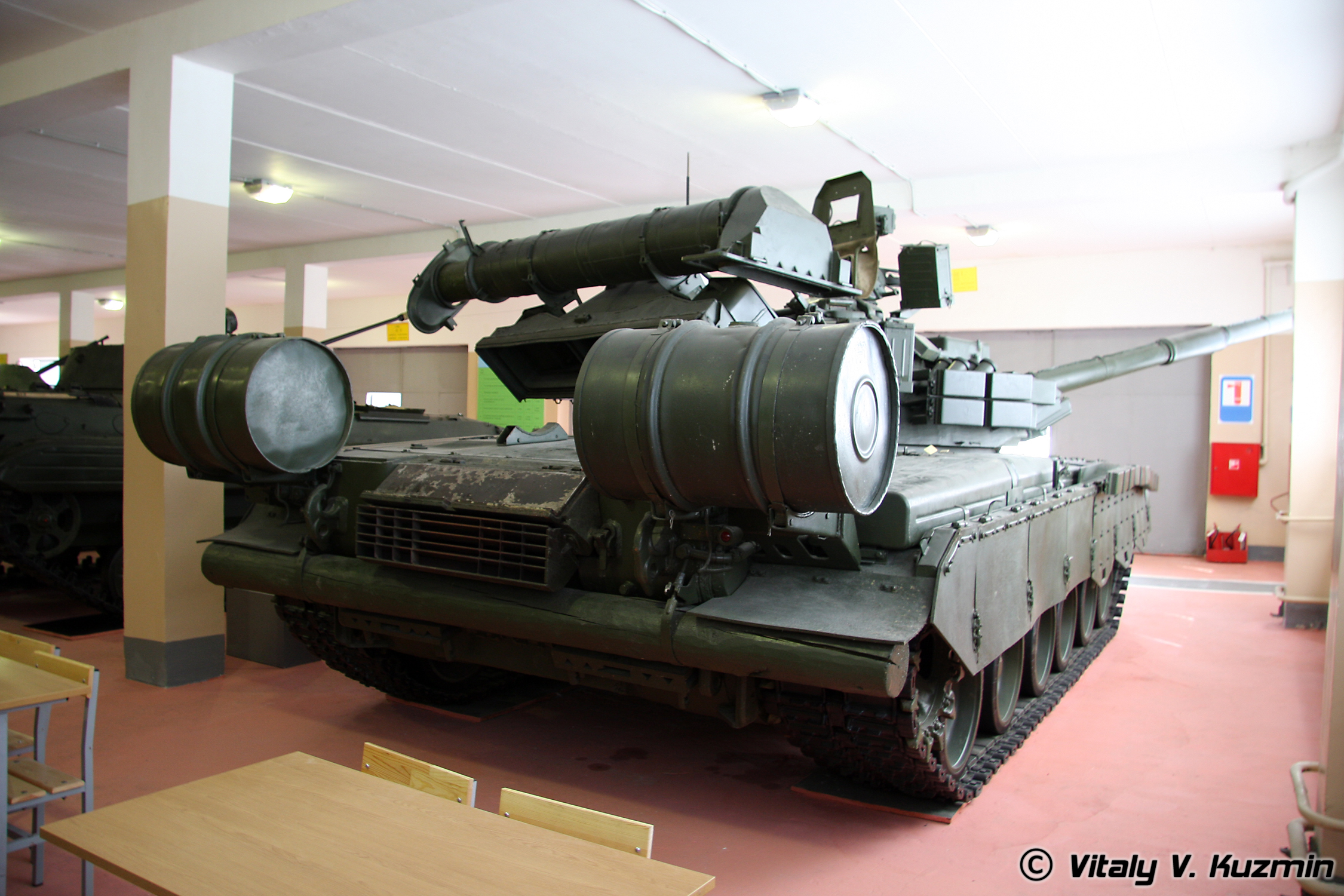

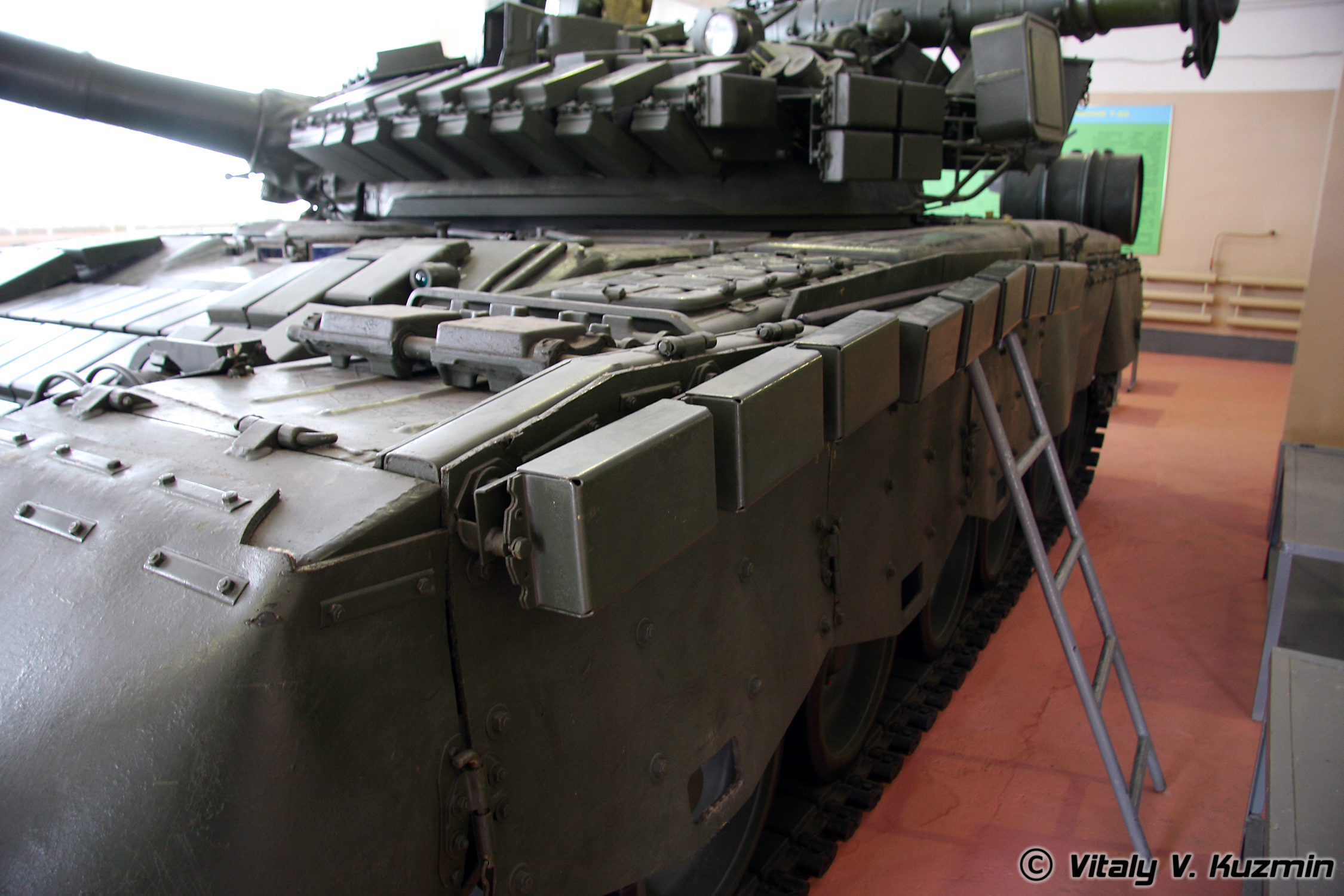

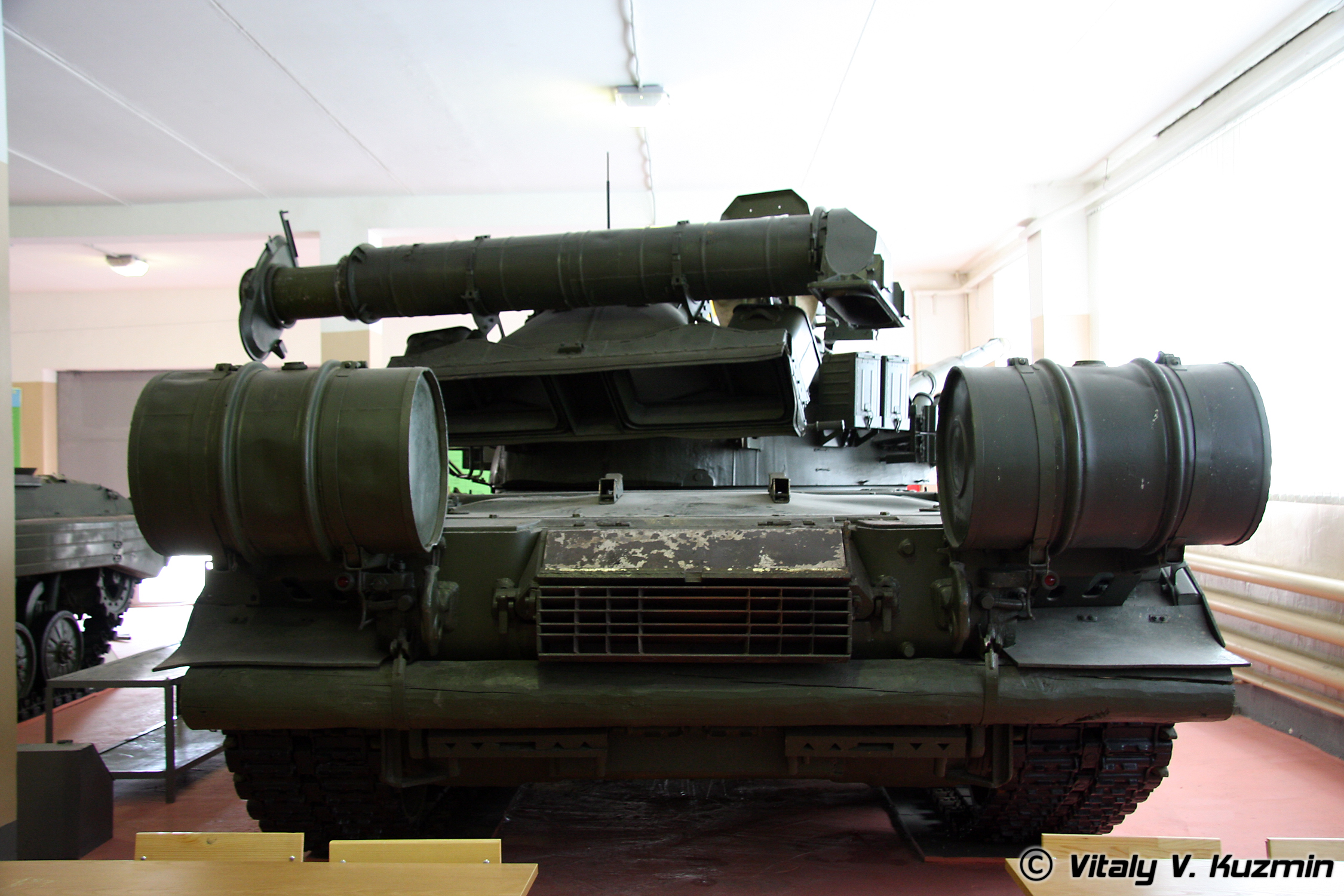

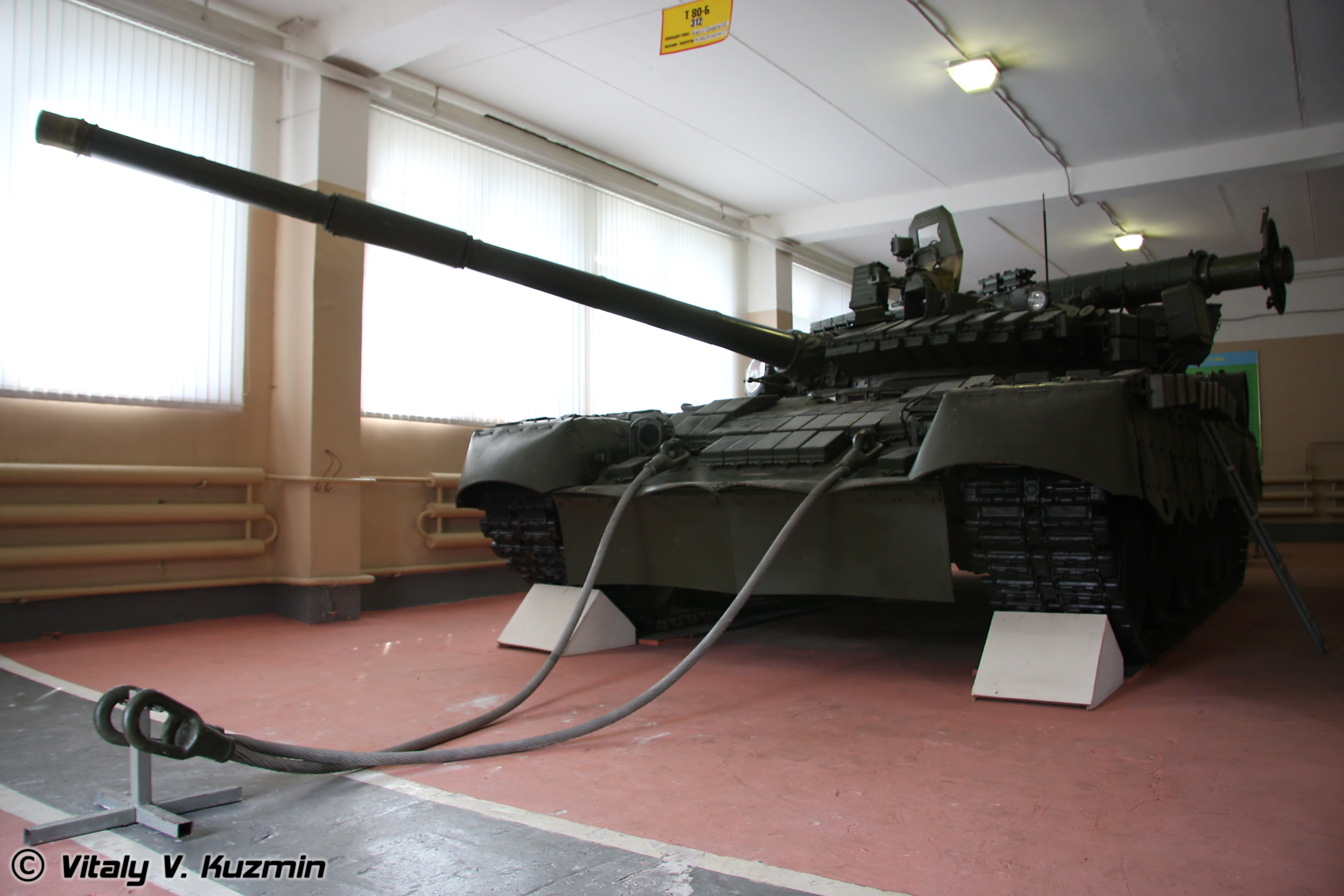

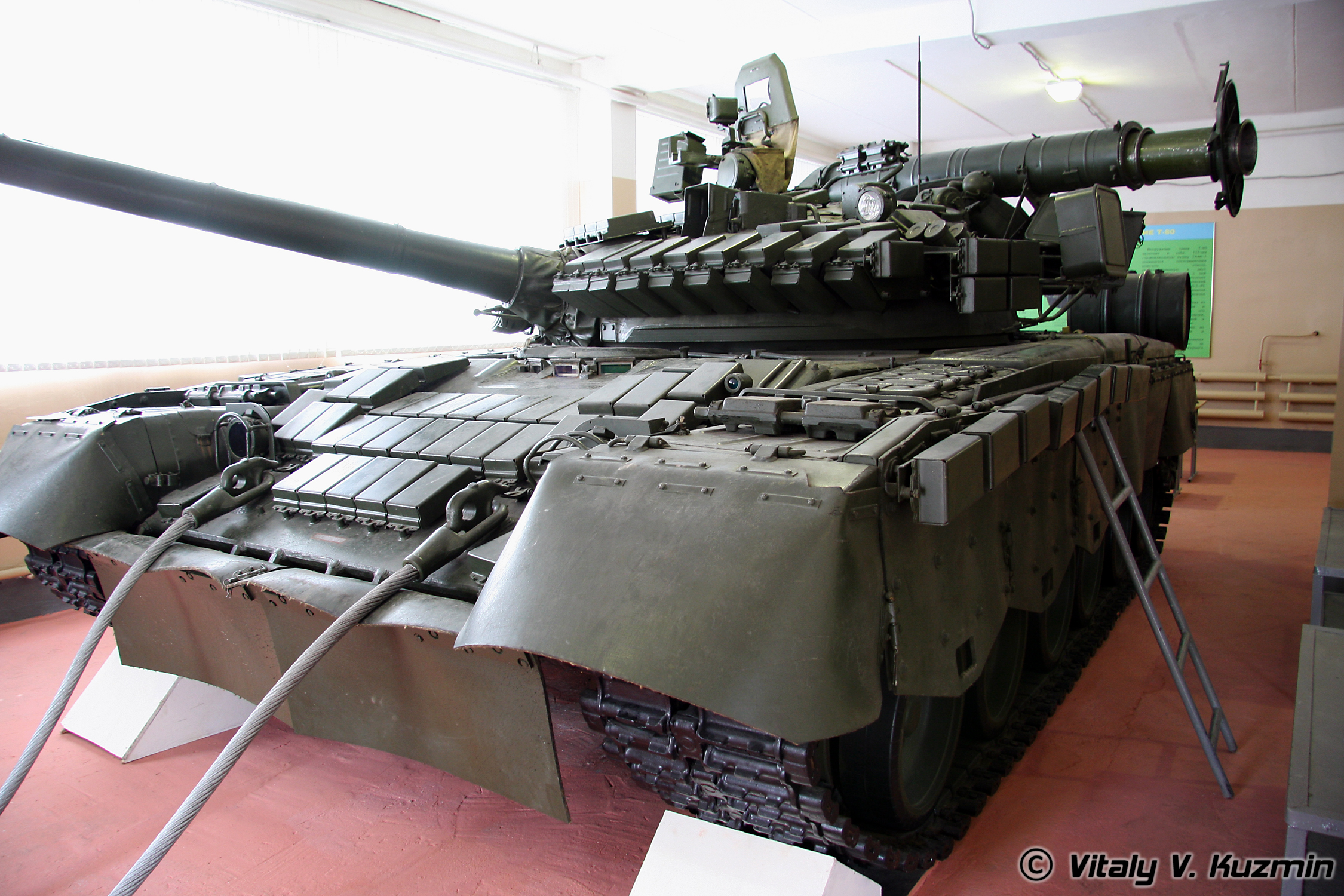

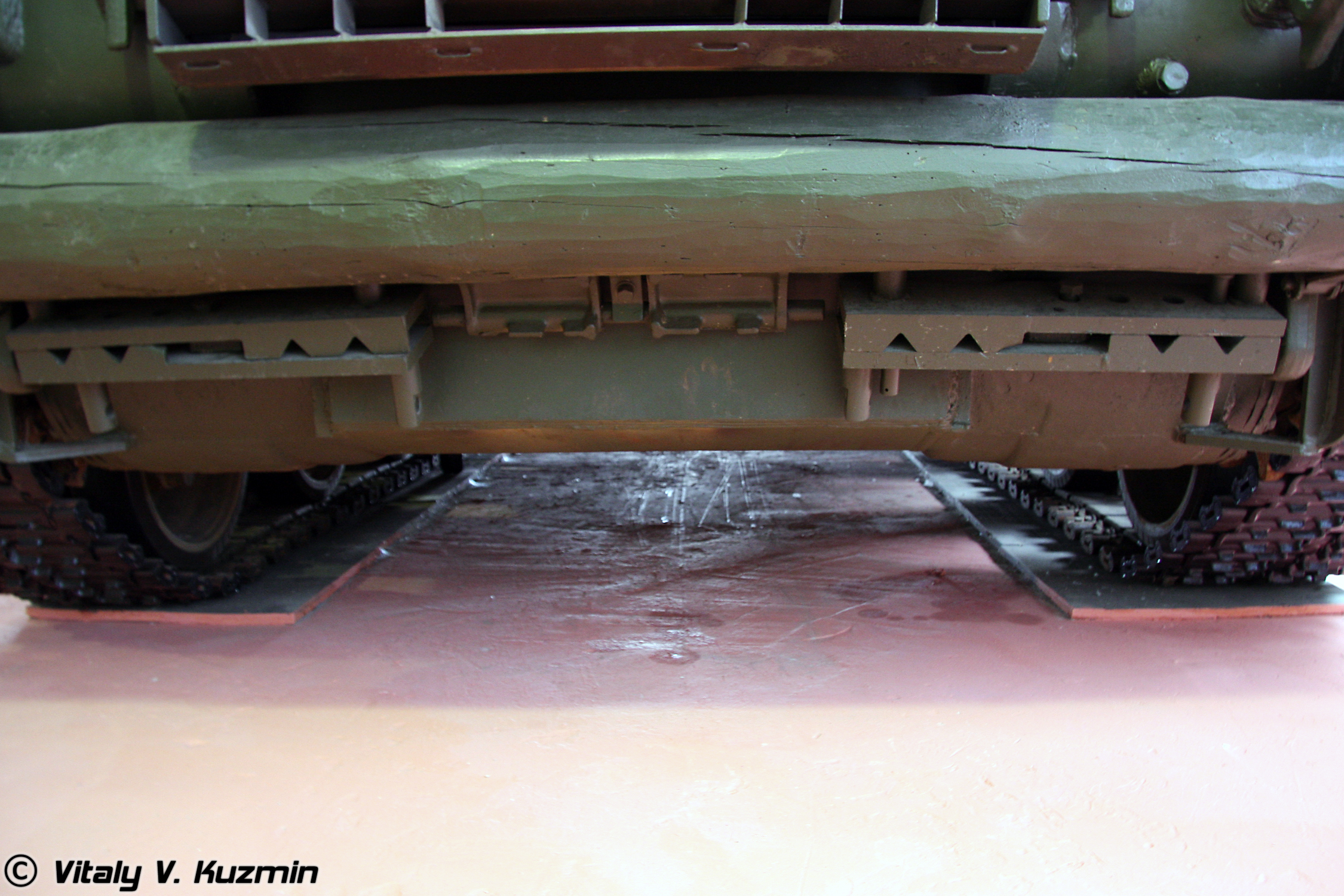

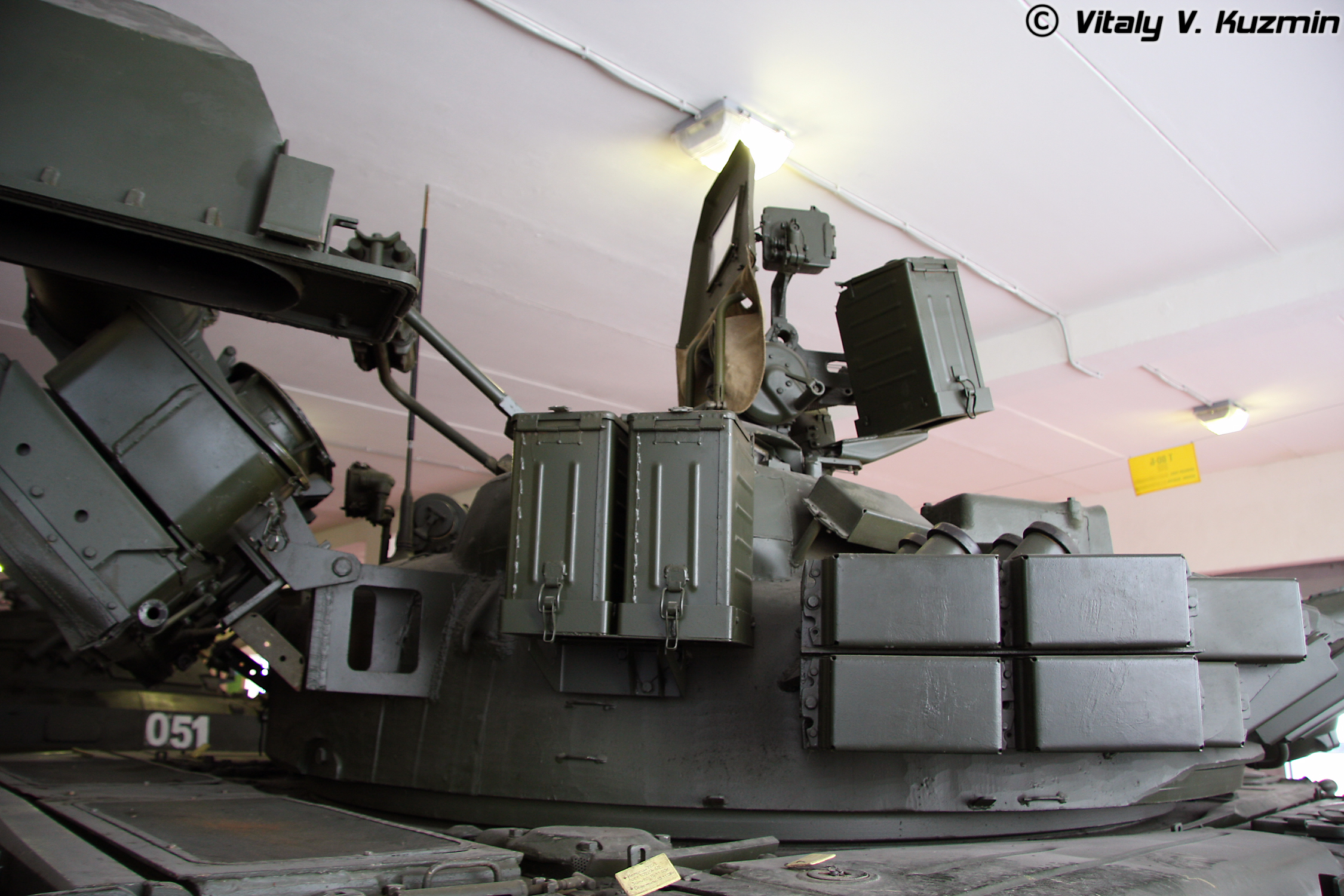

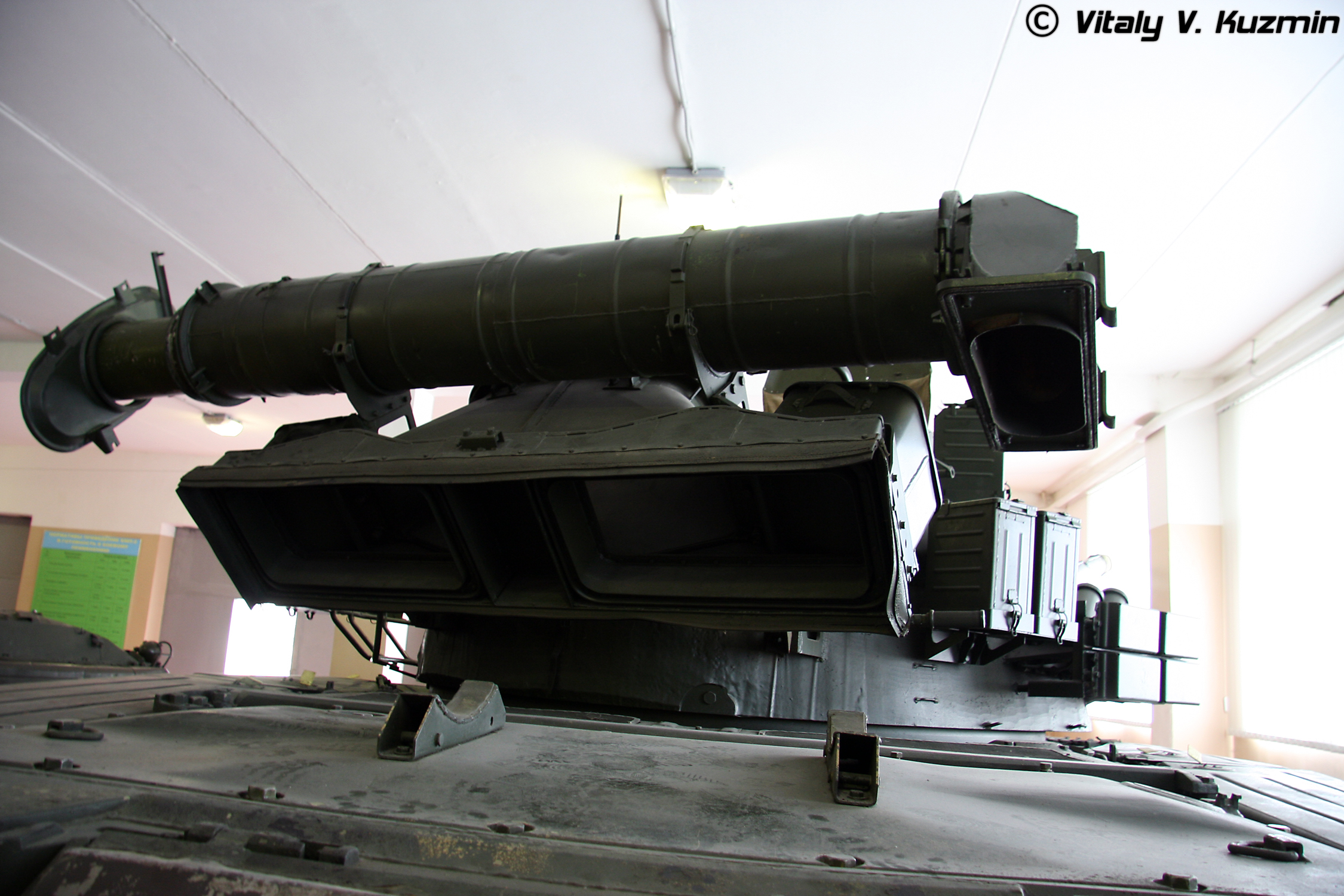

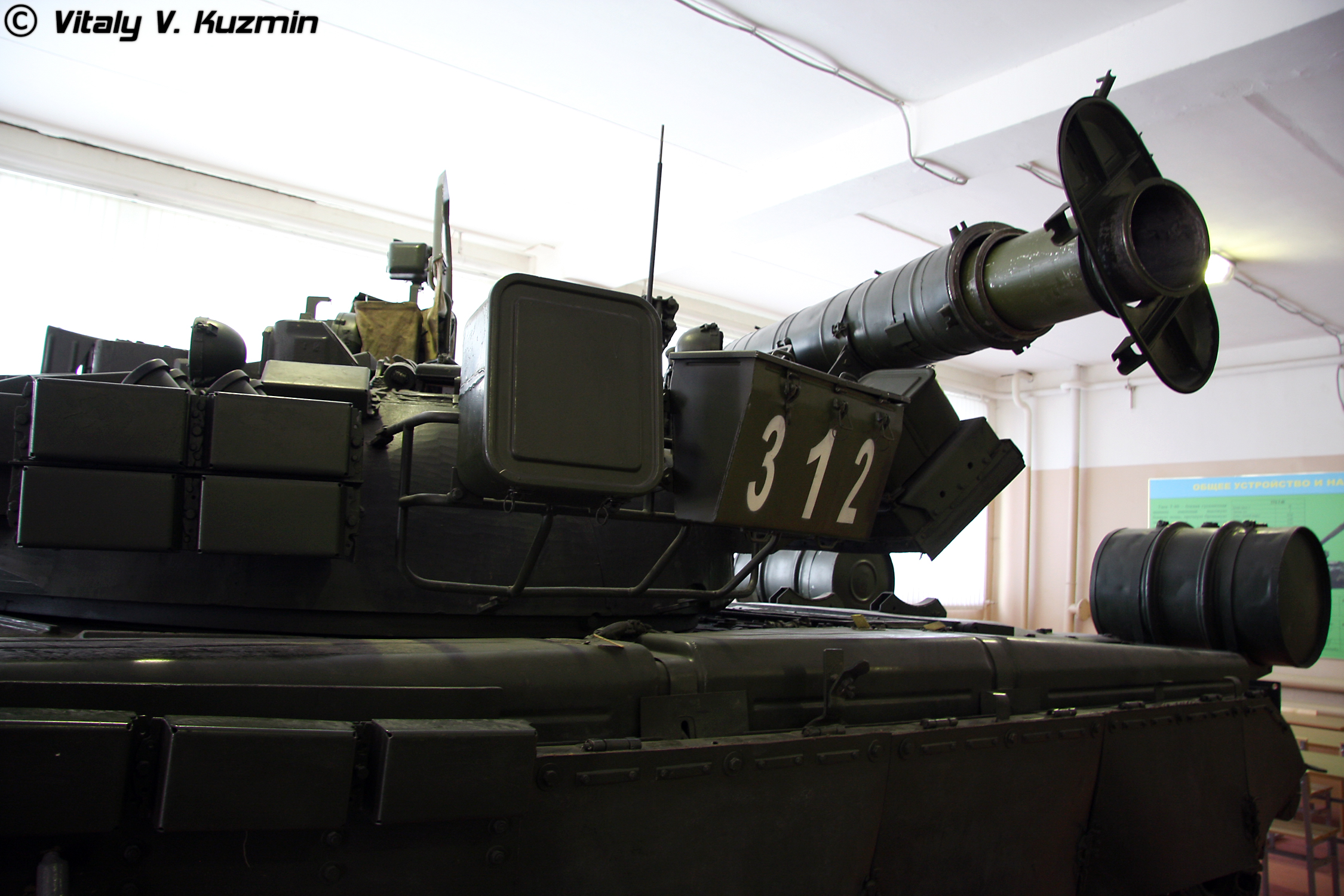

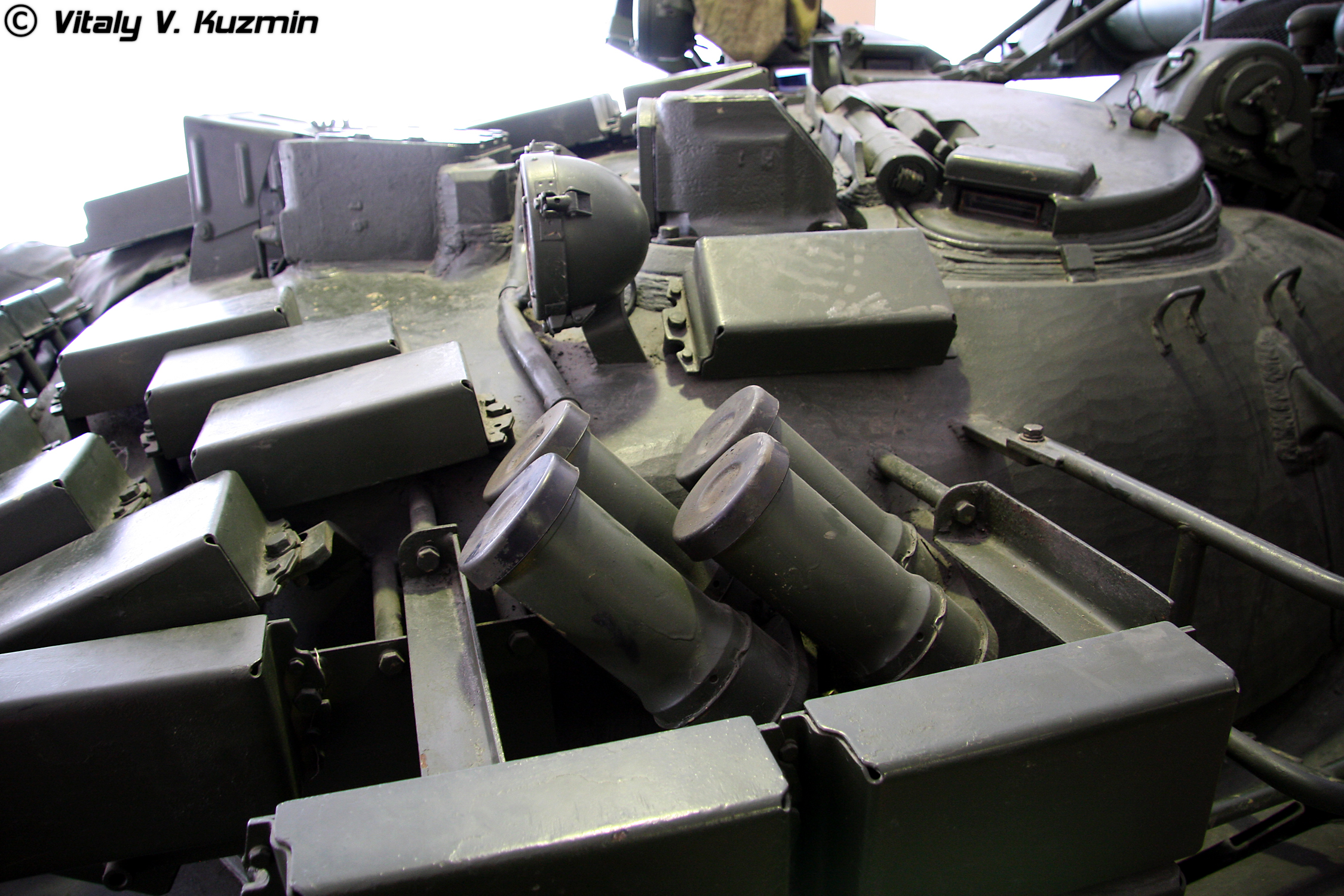

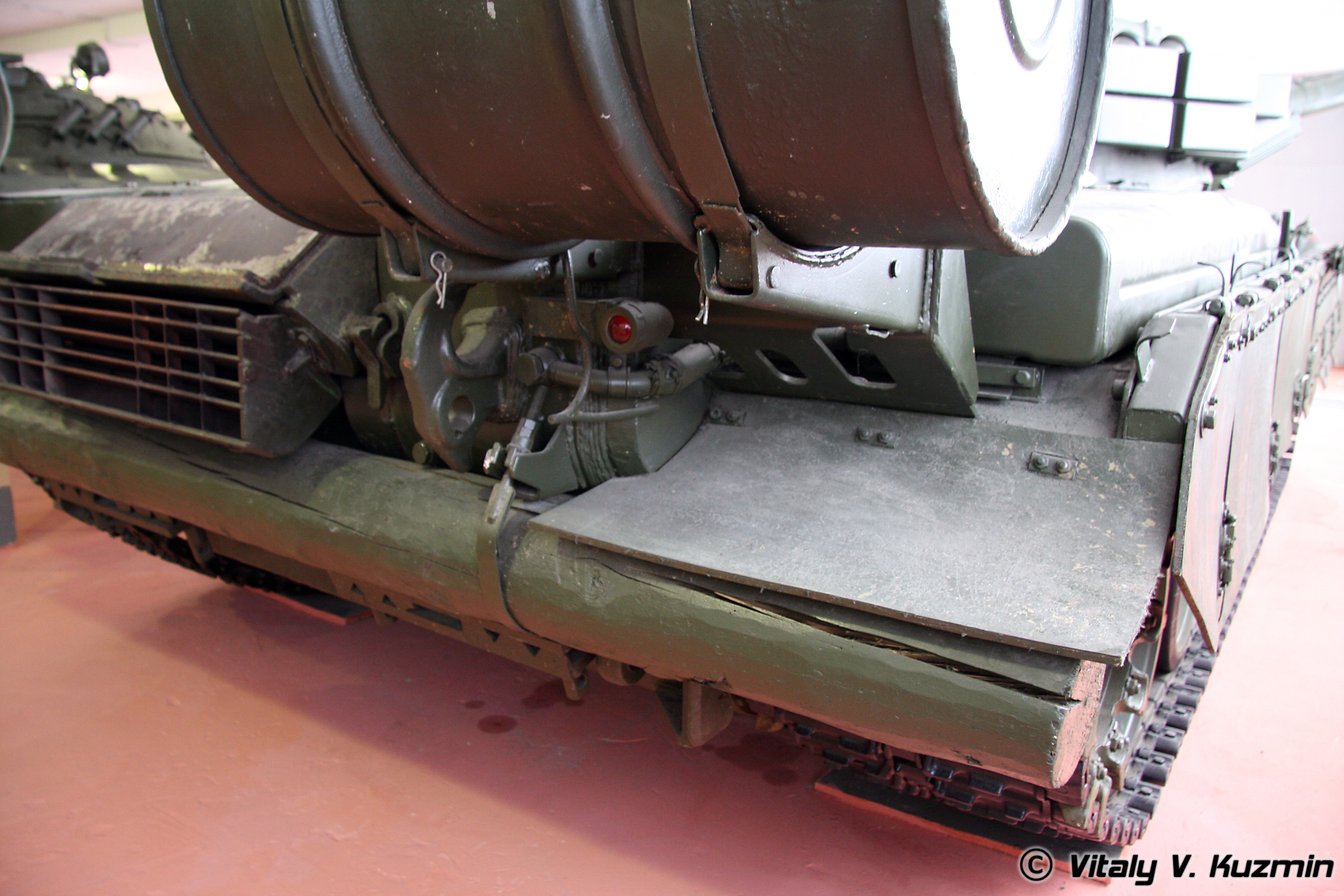

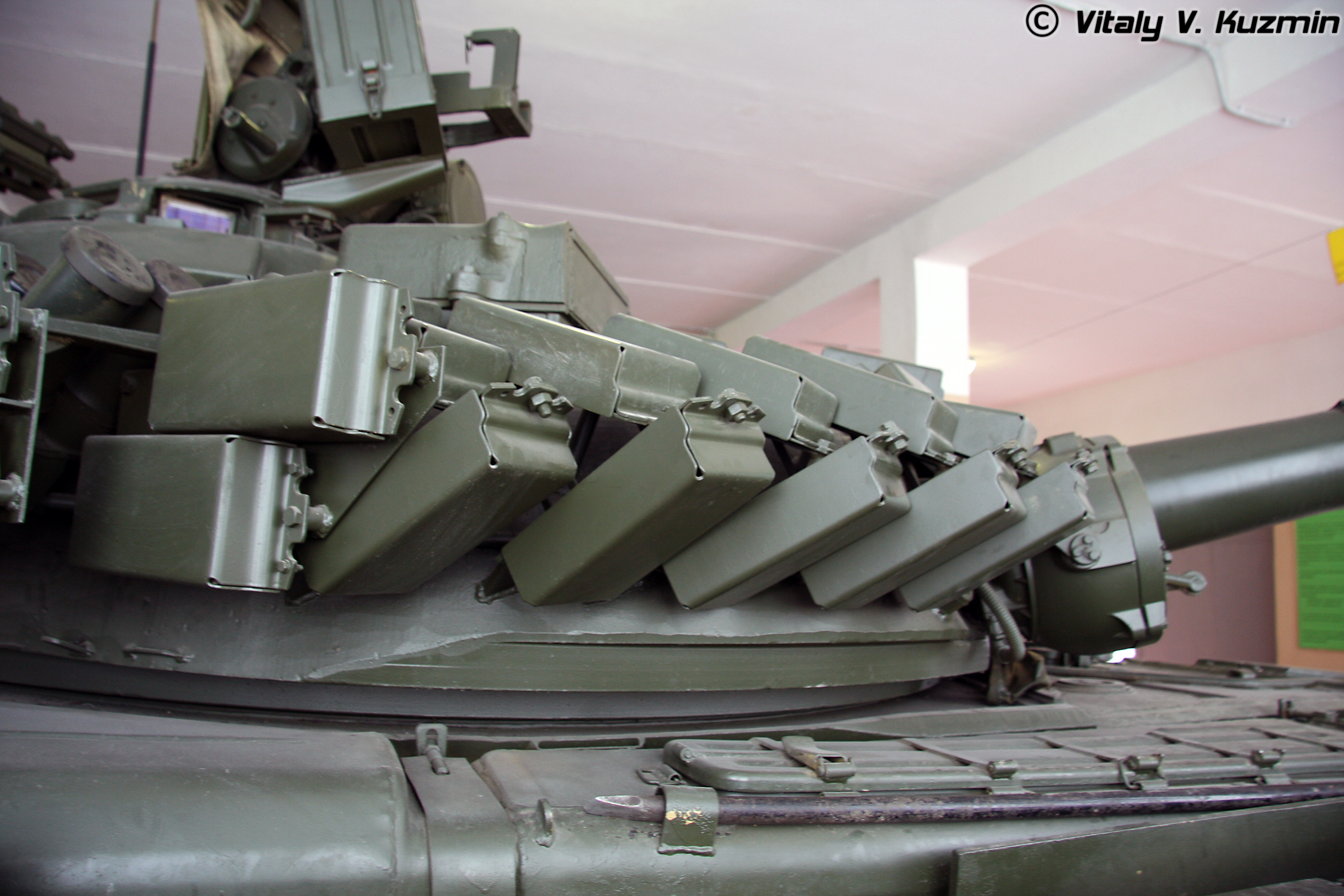

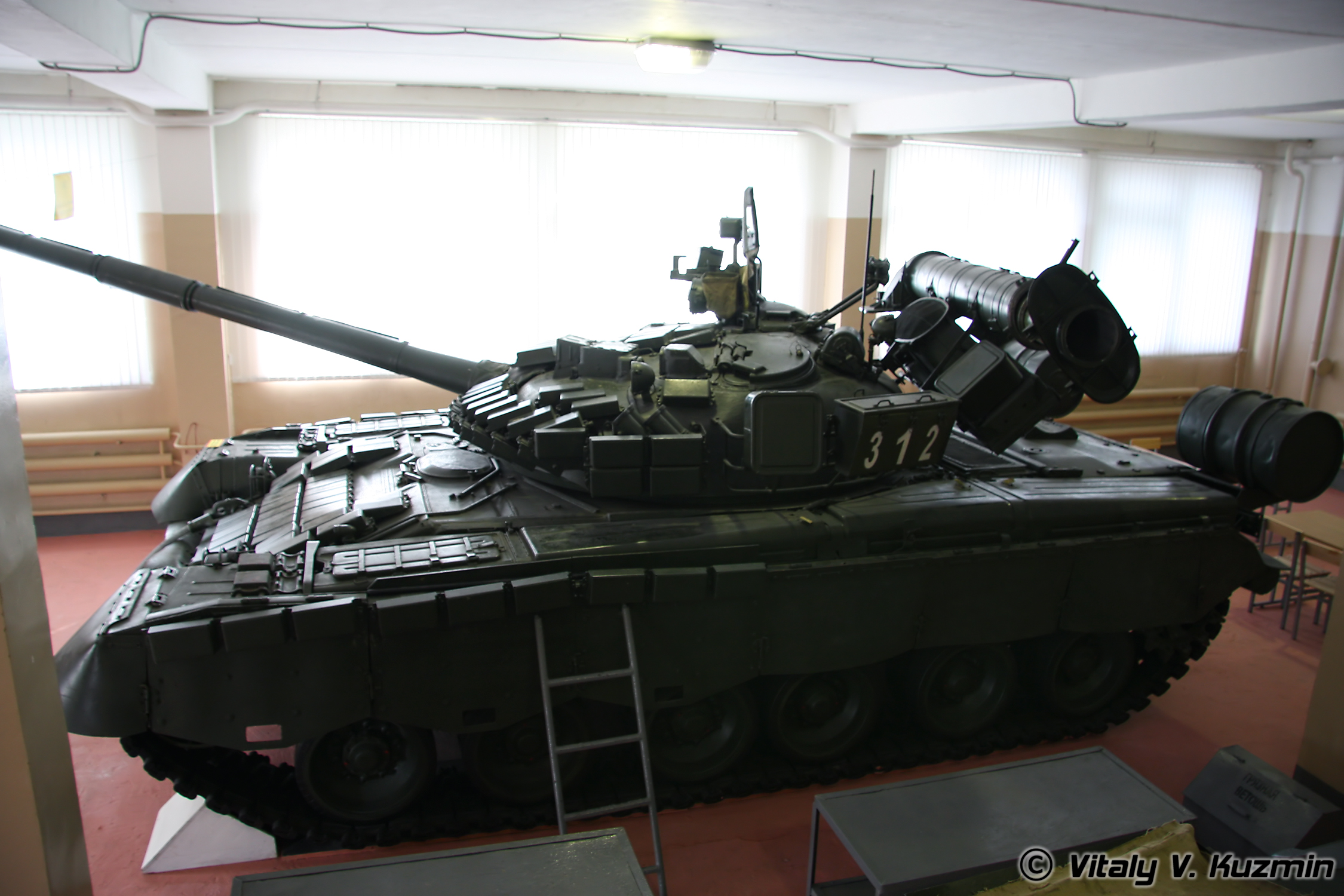

                BMP-2

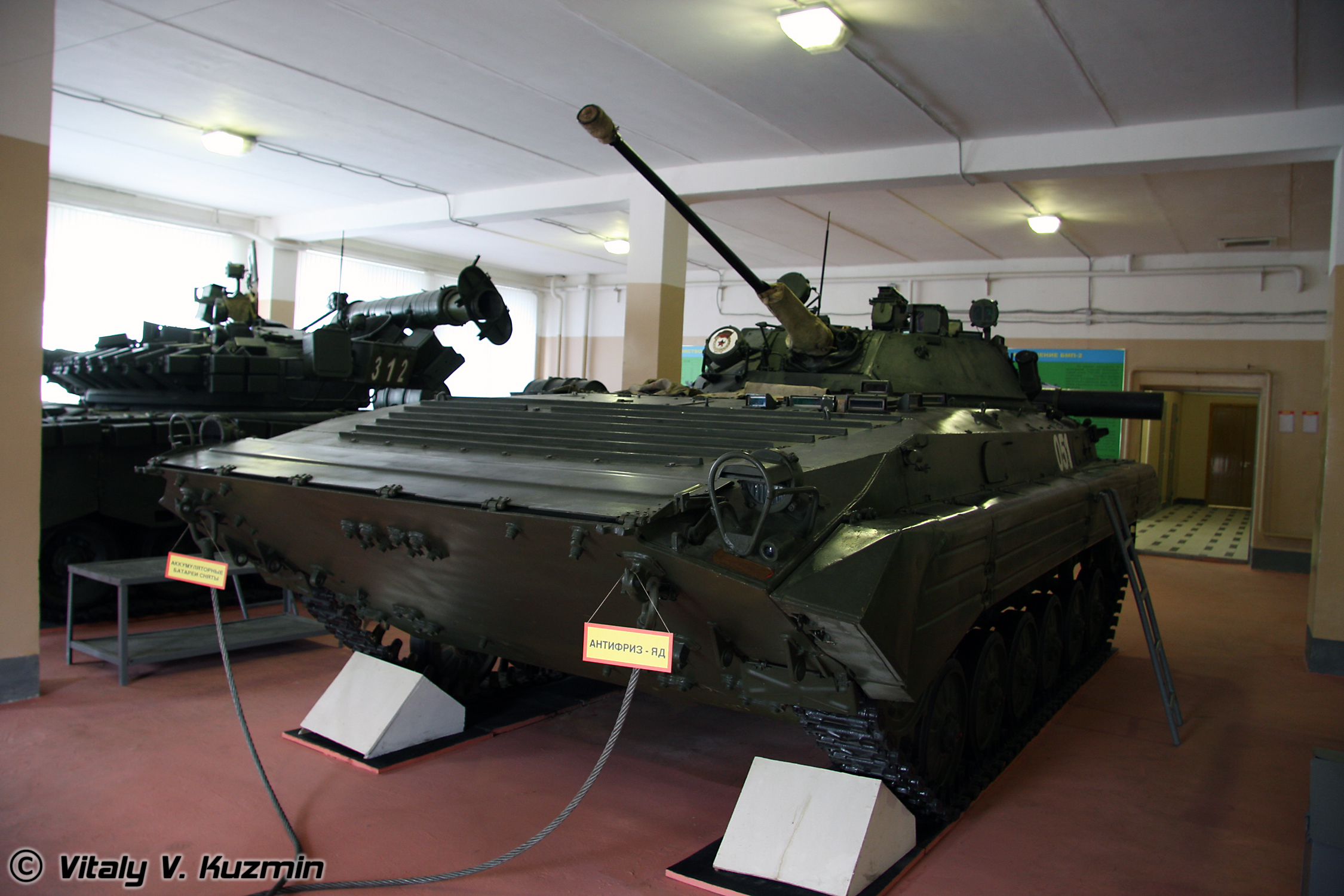

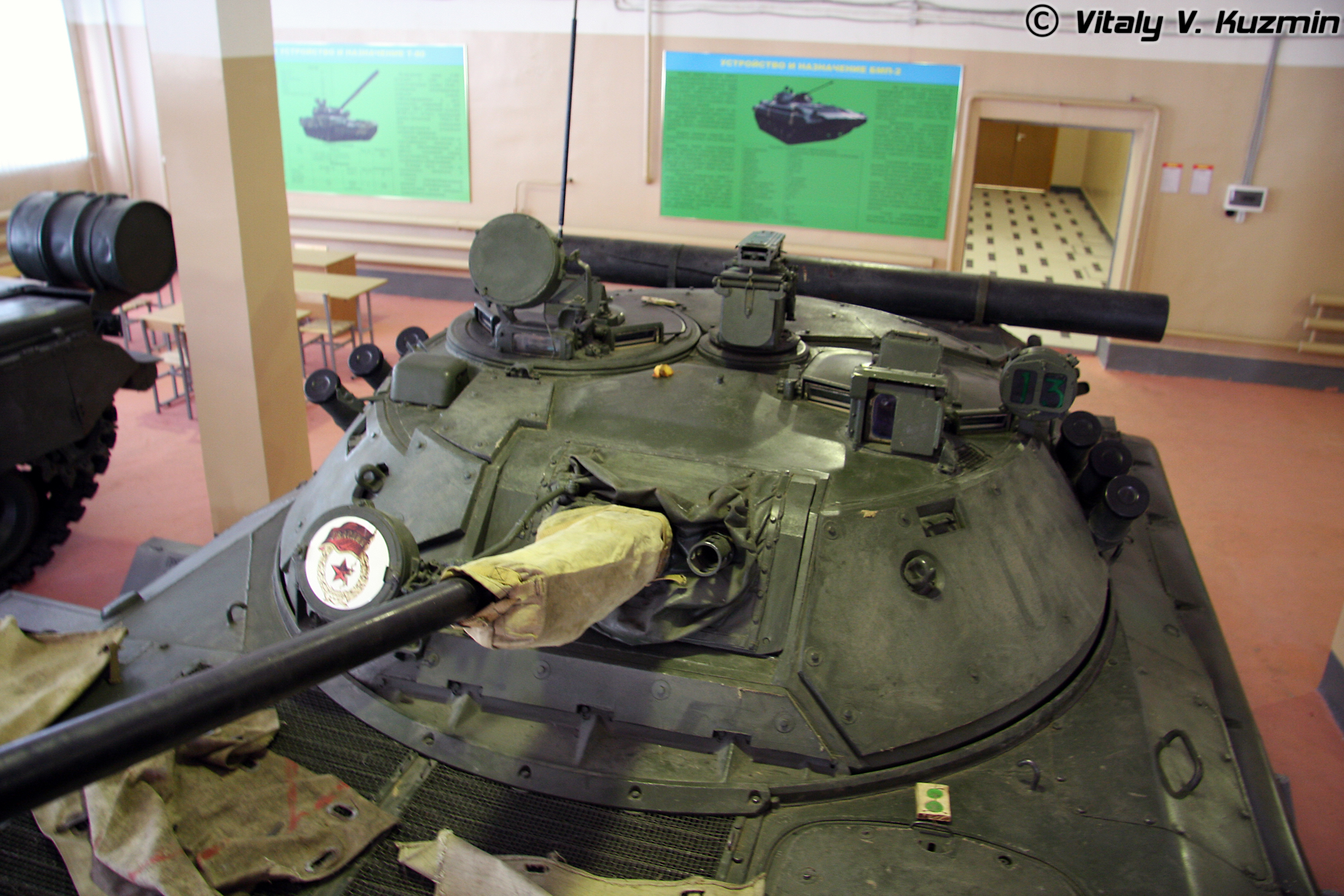

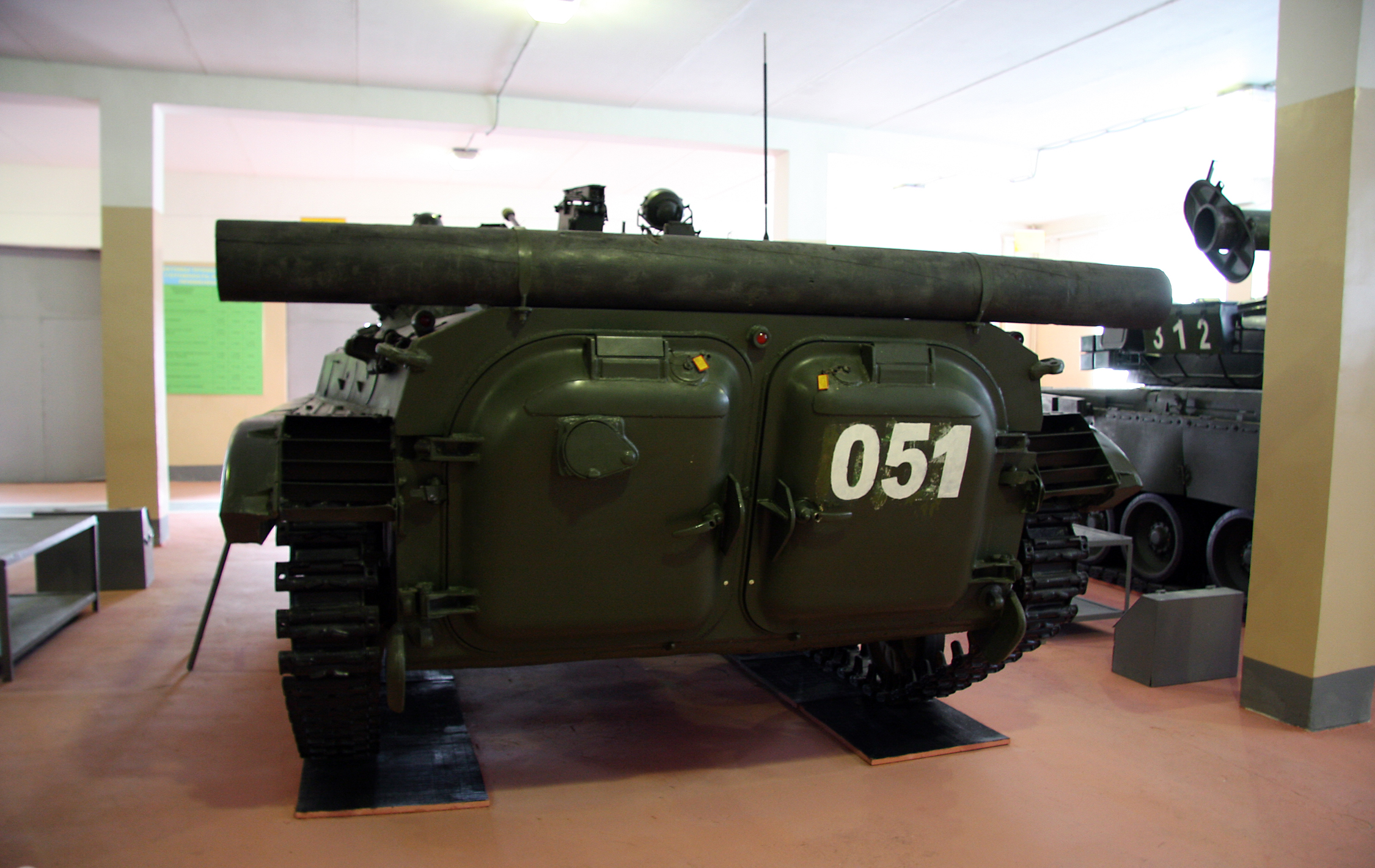

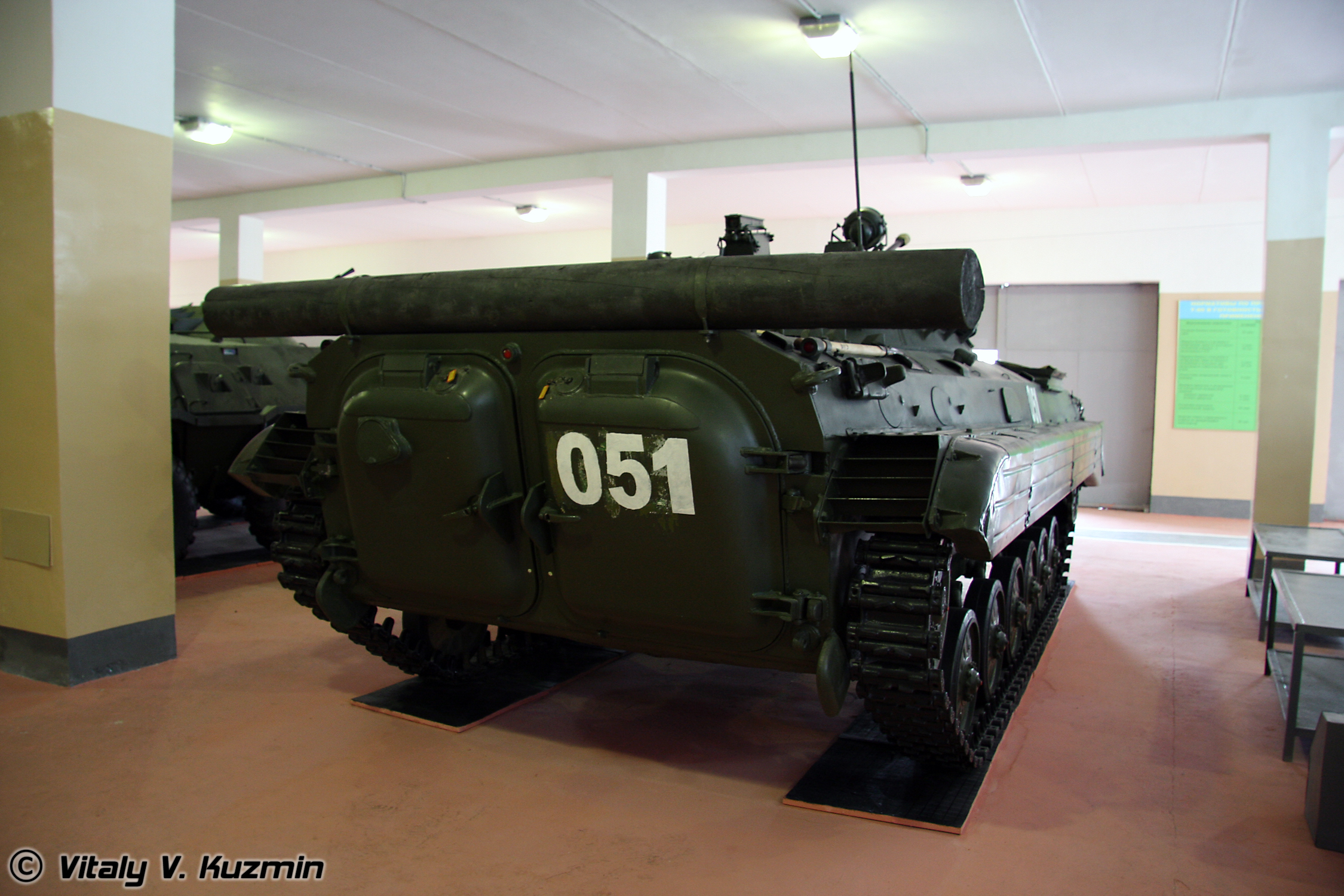

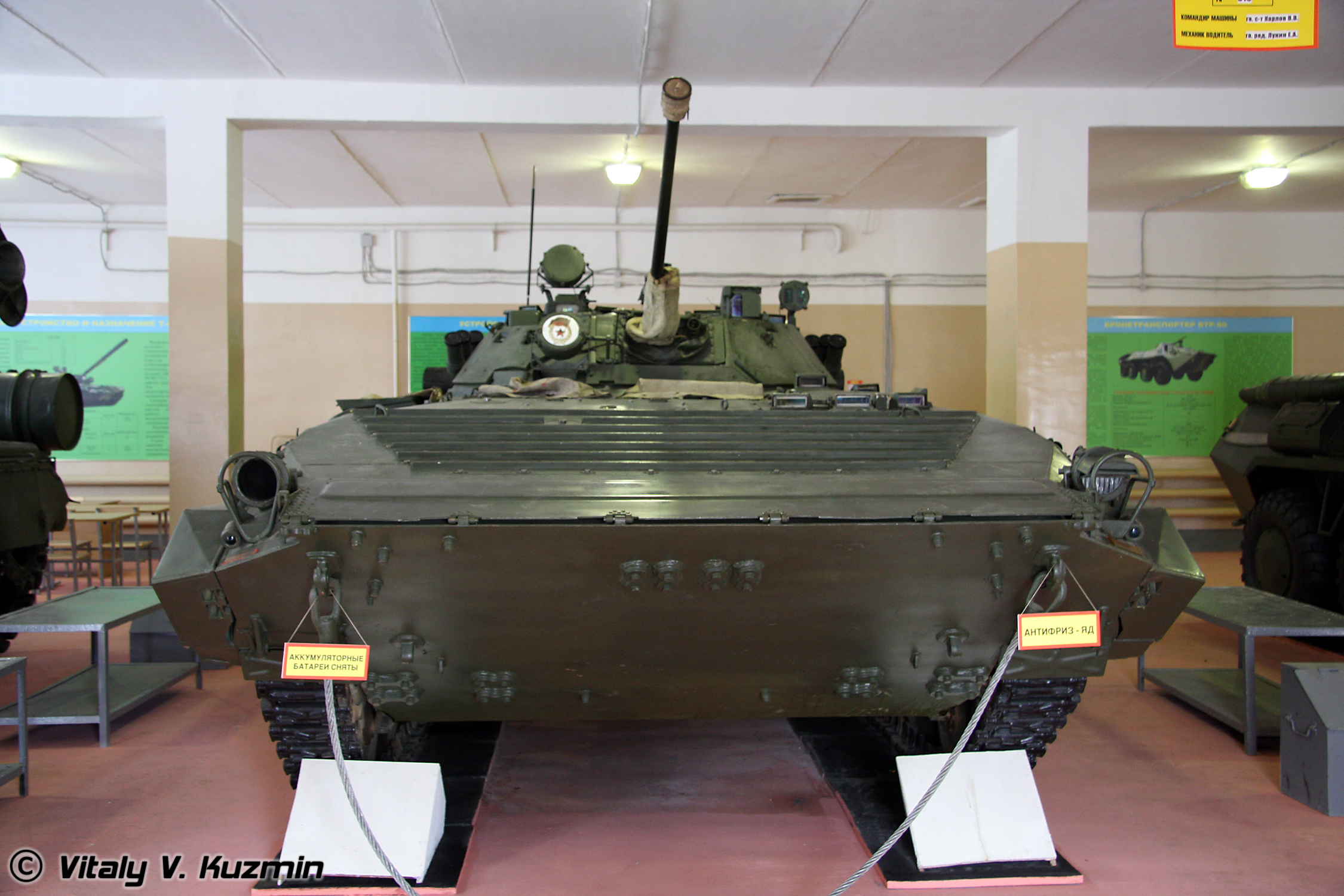

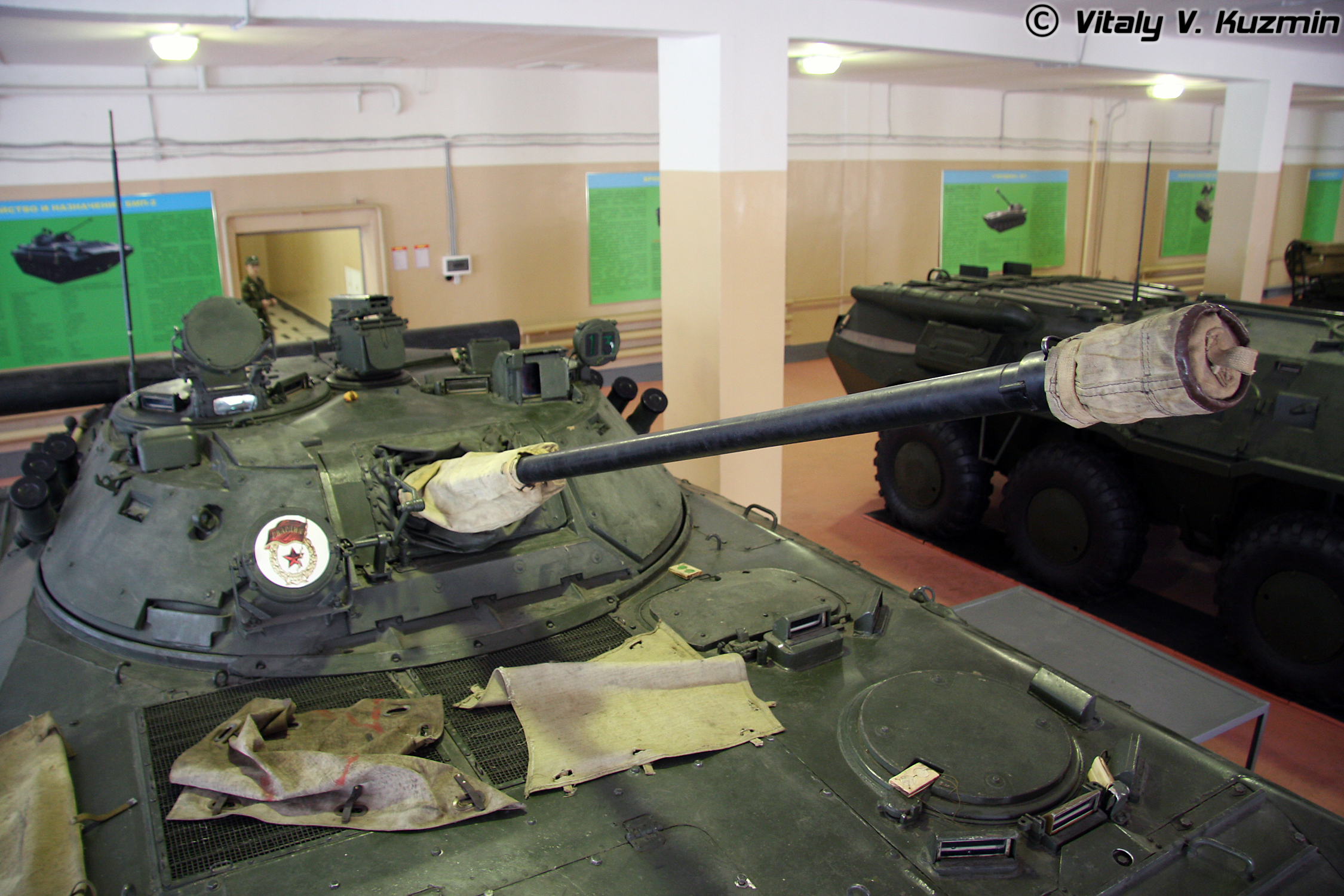

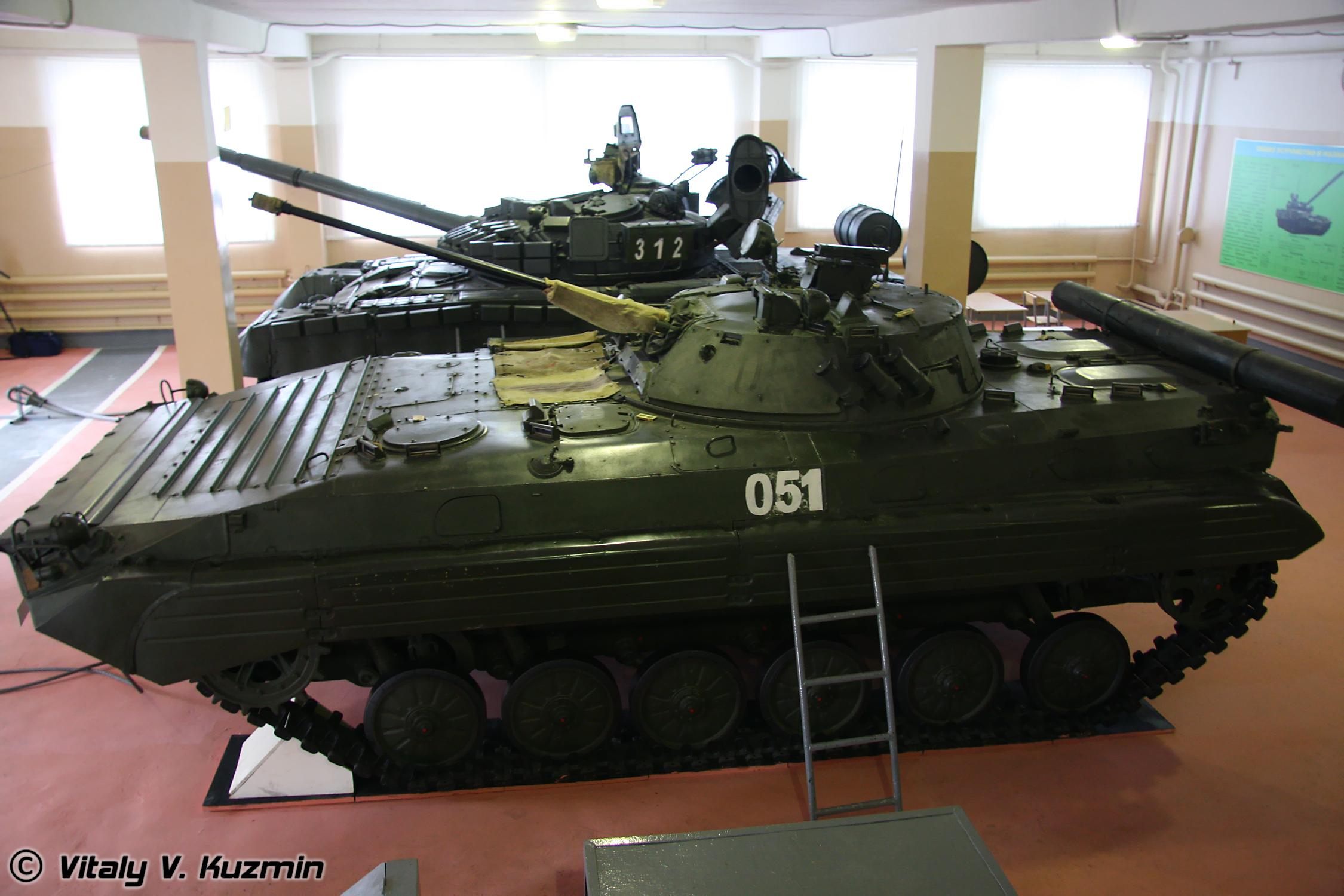

                BTR-80

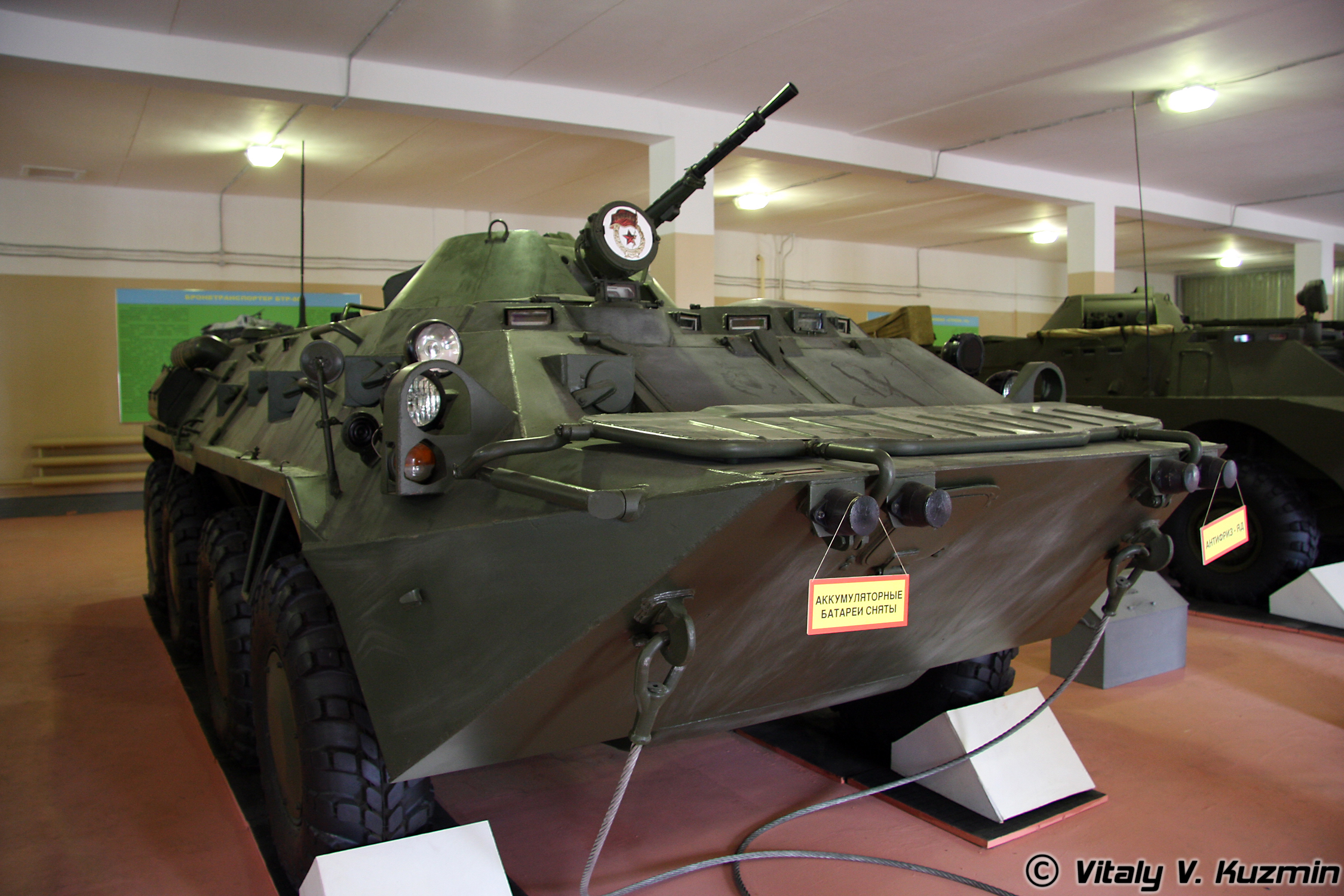

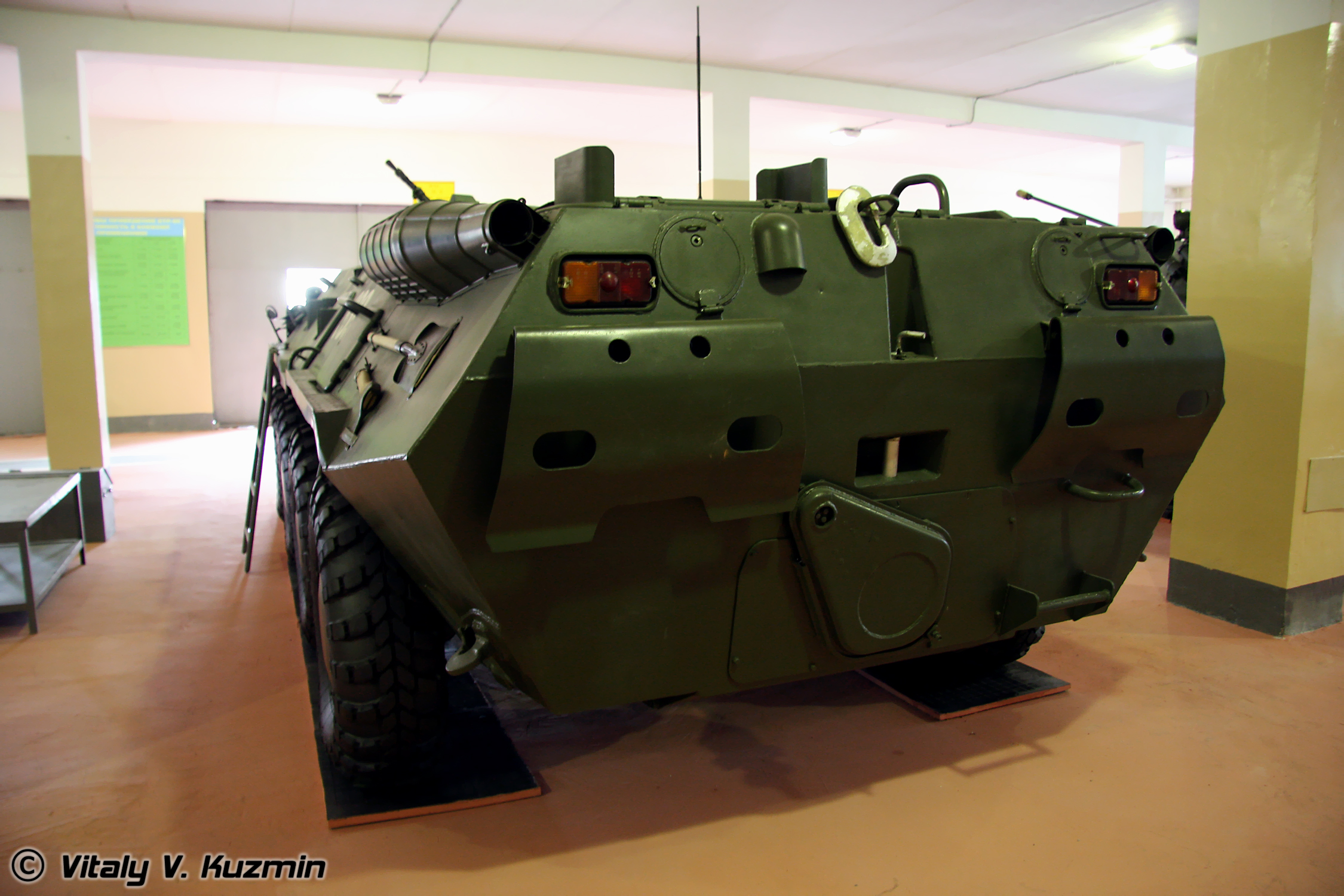

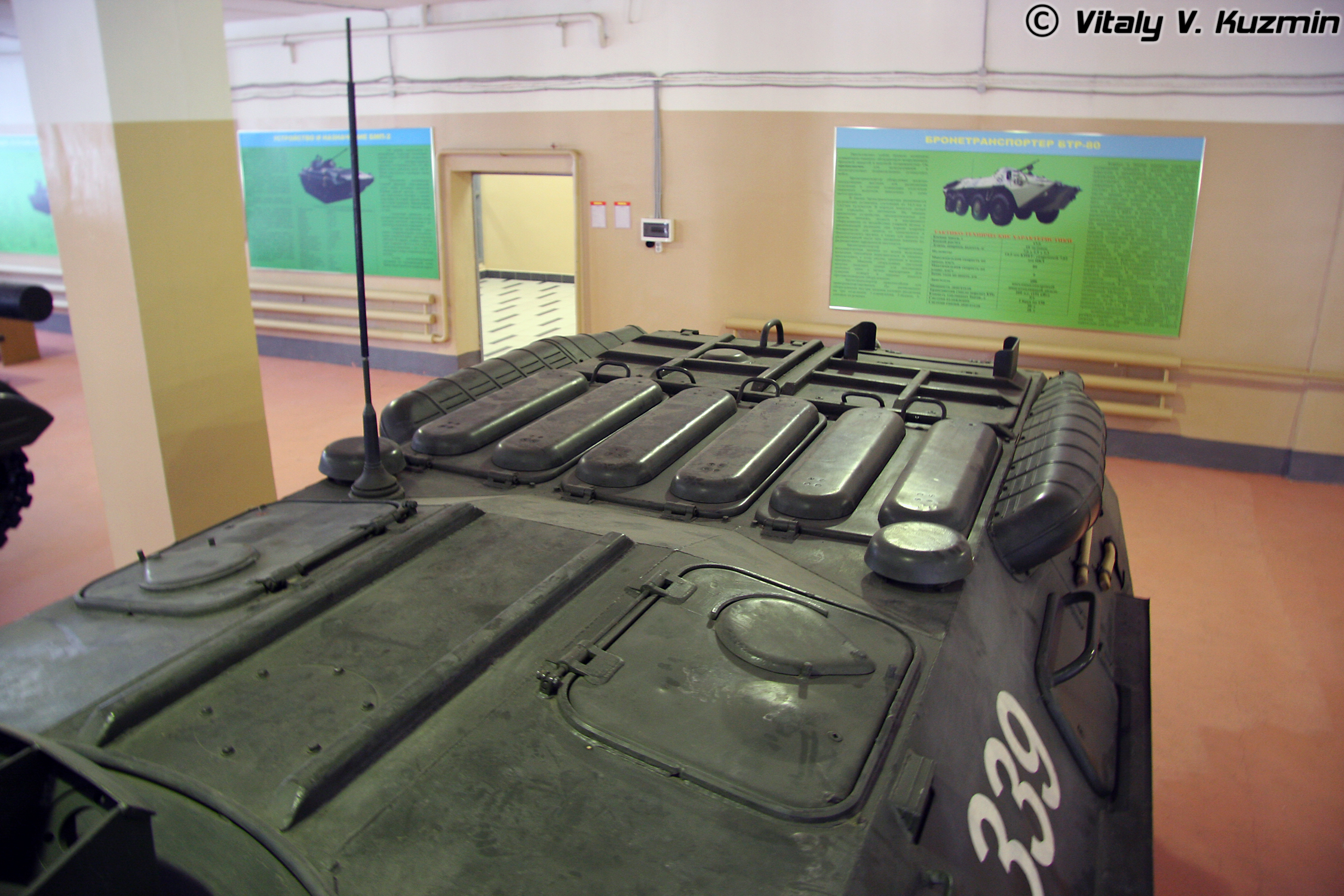

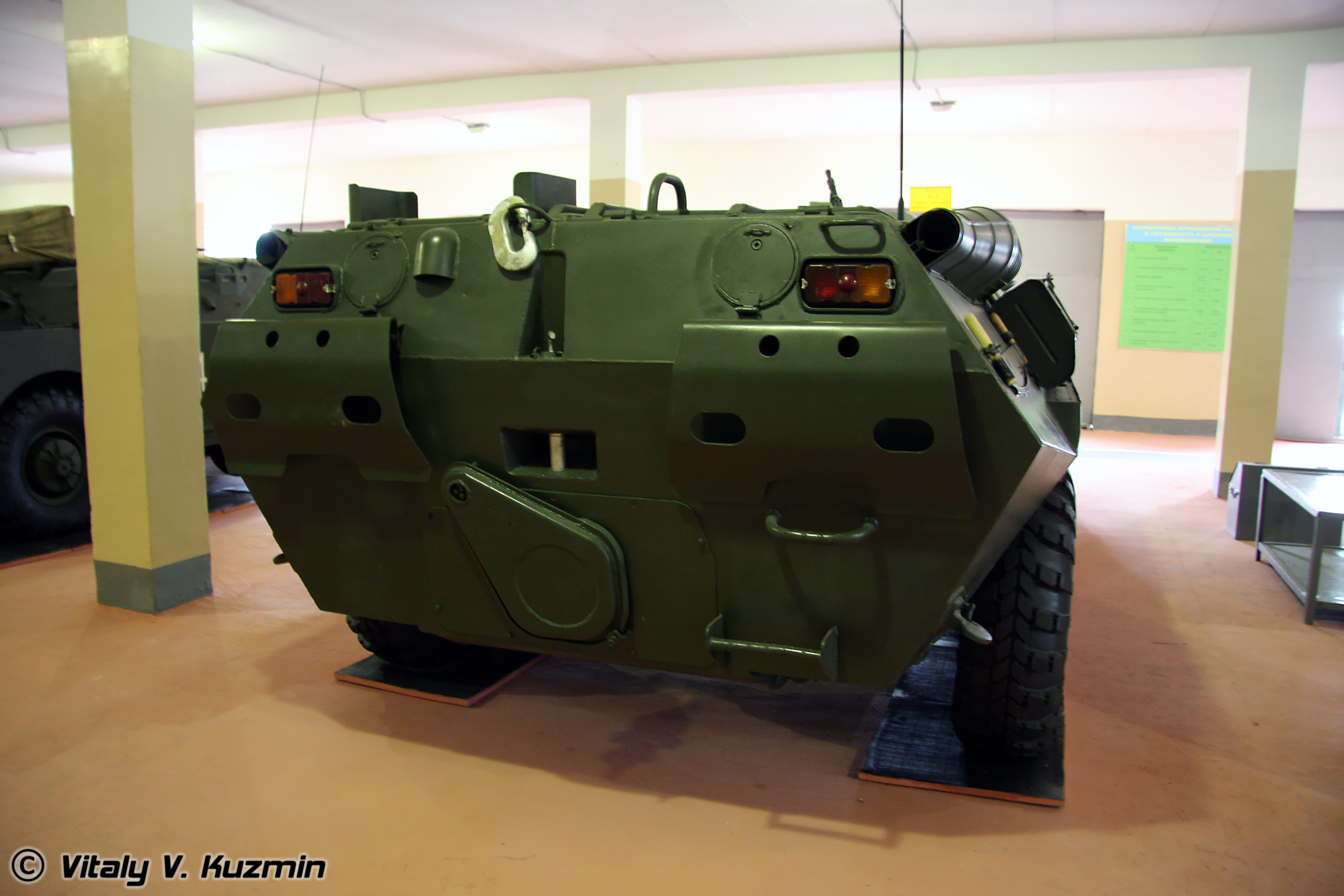

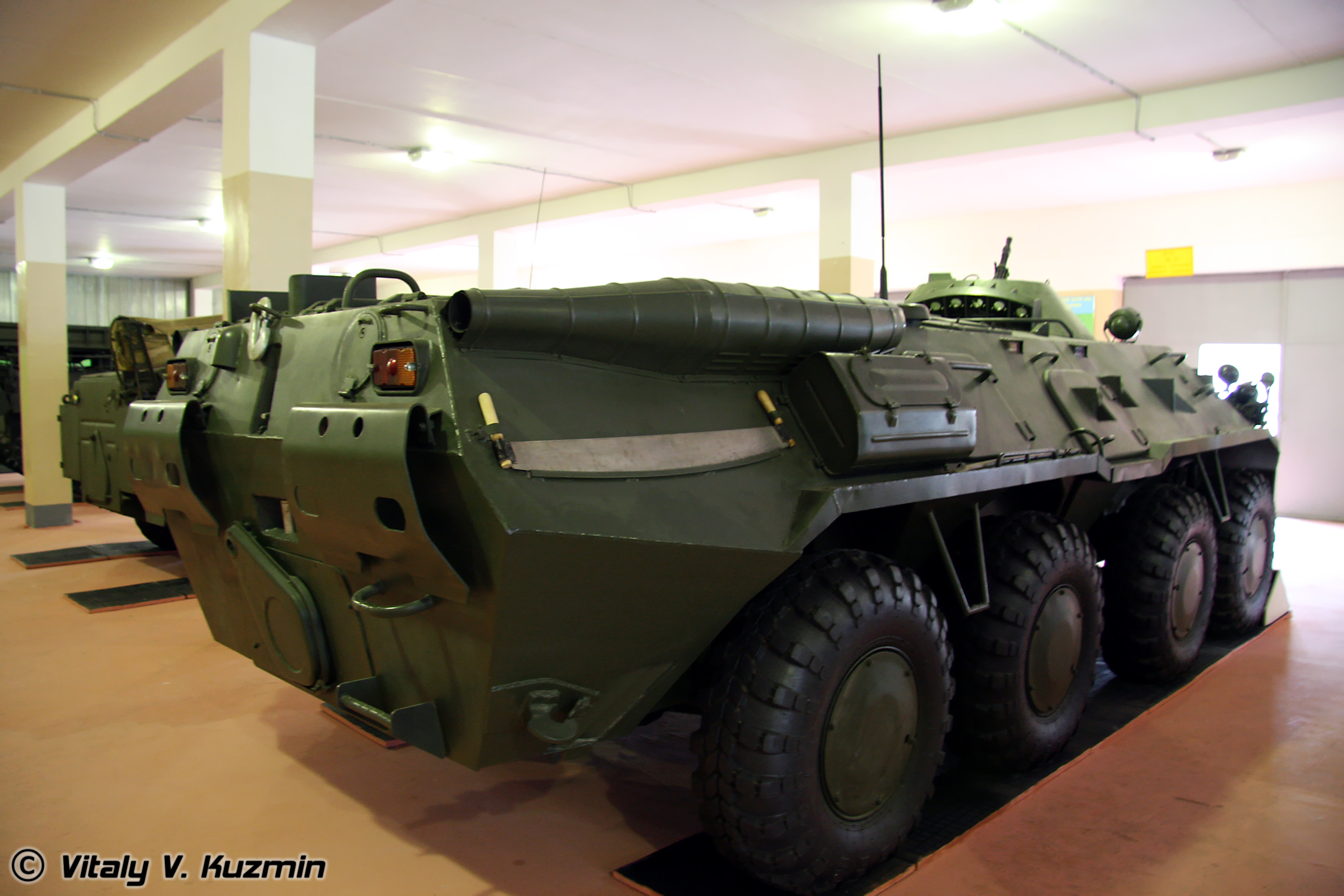

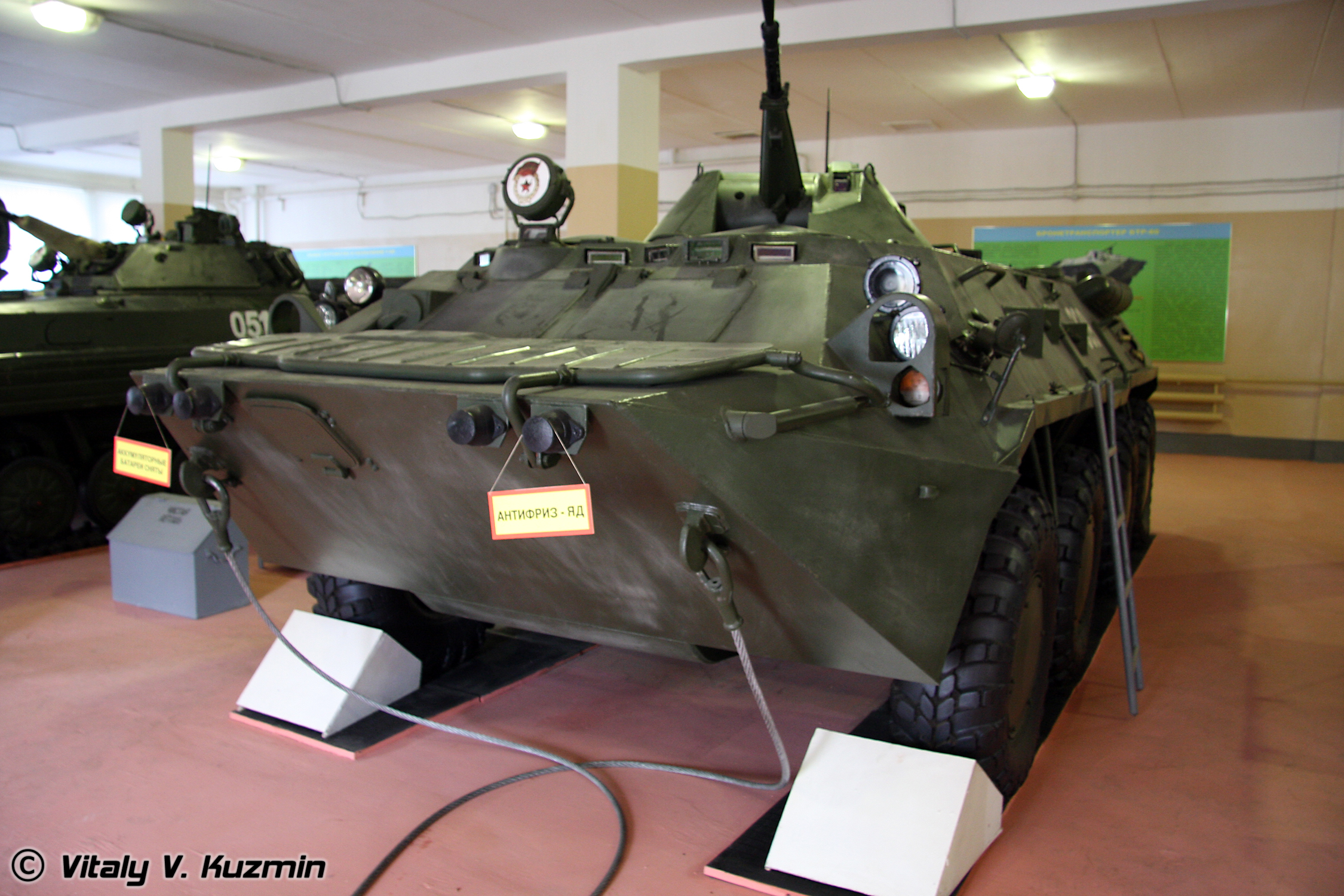

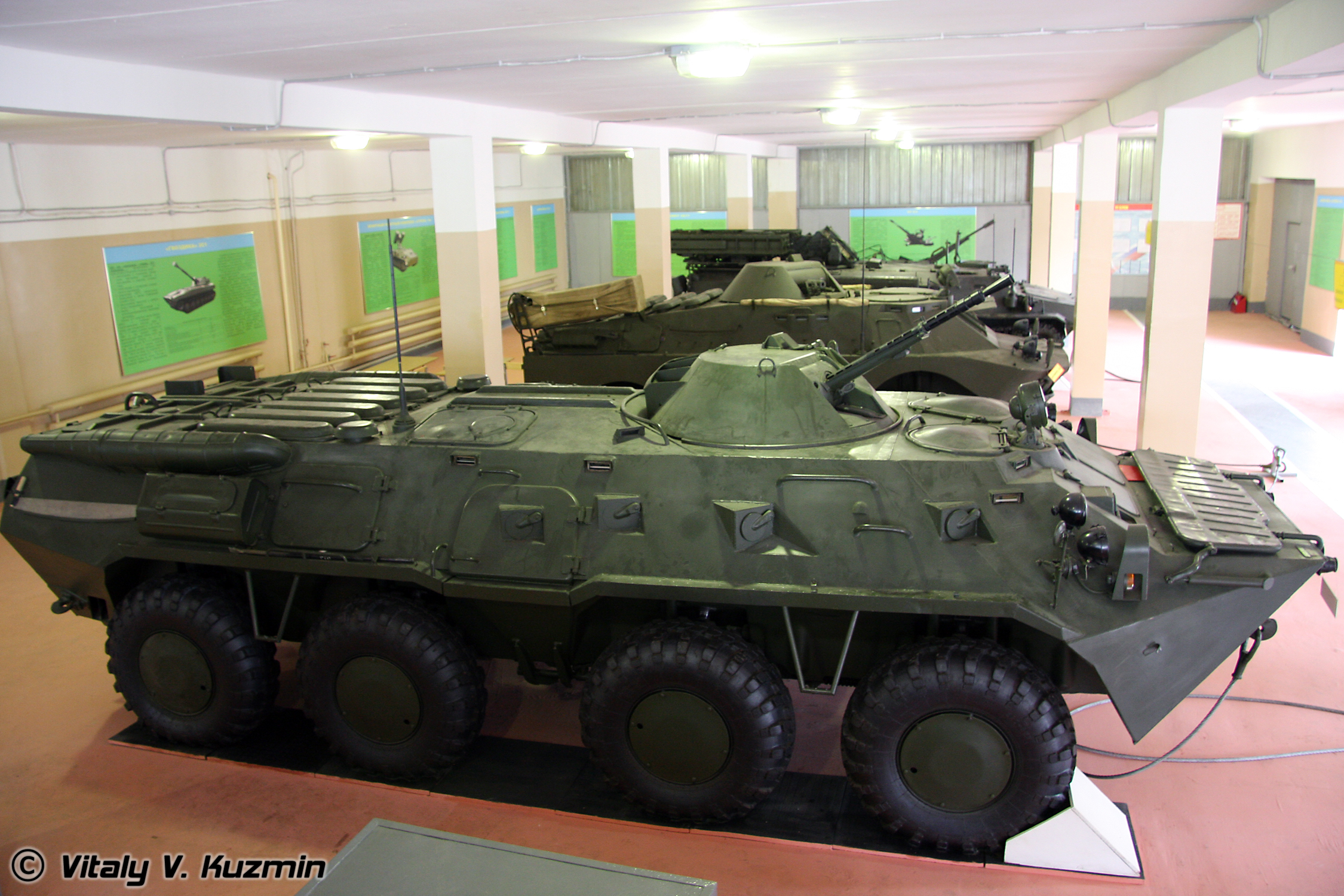

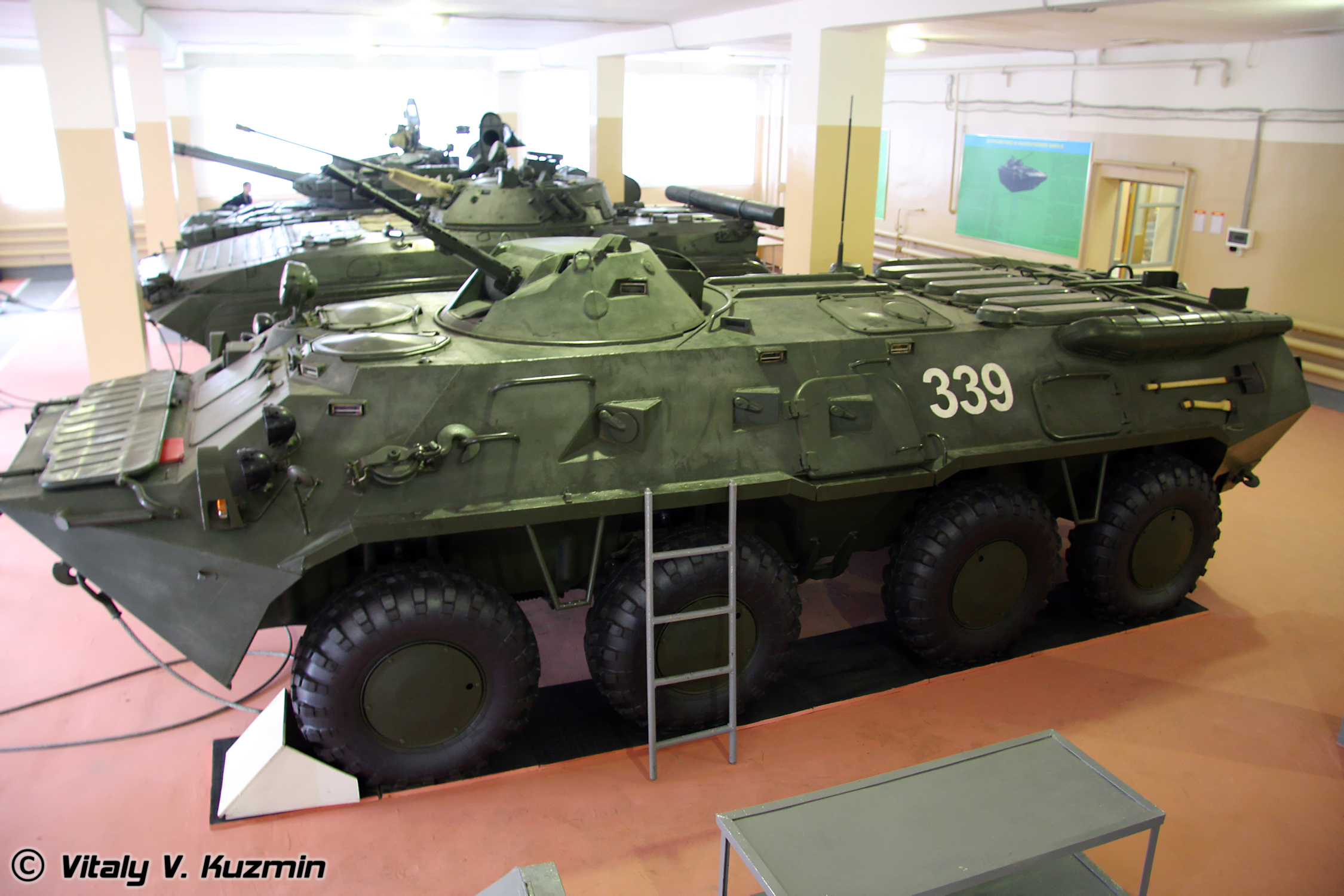

                BRDM-2

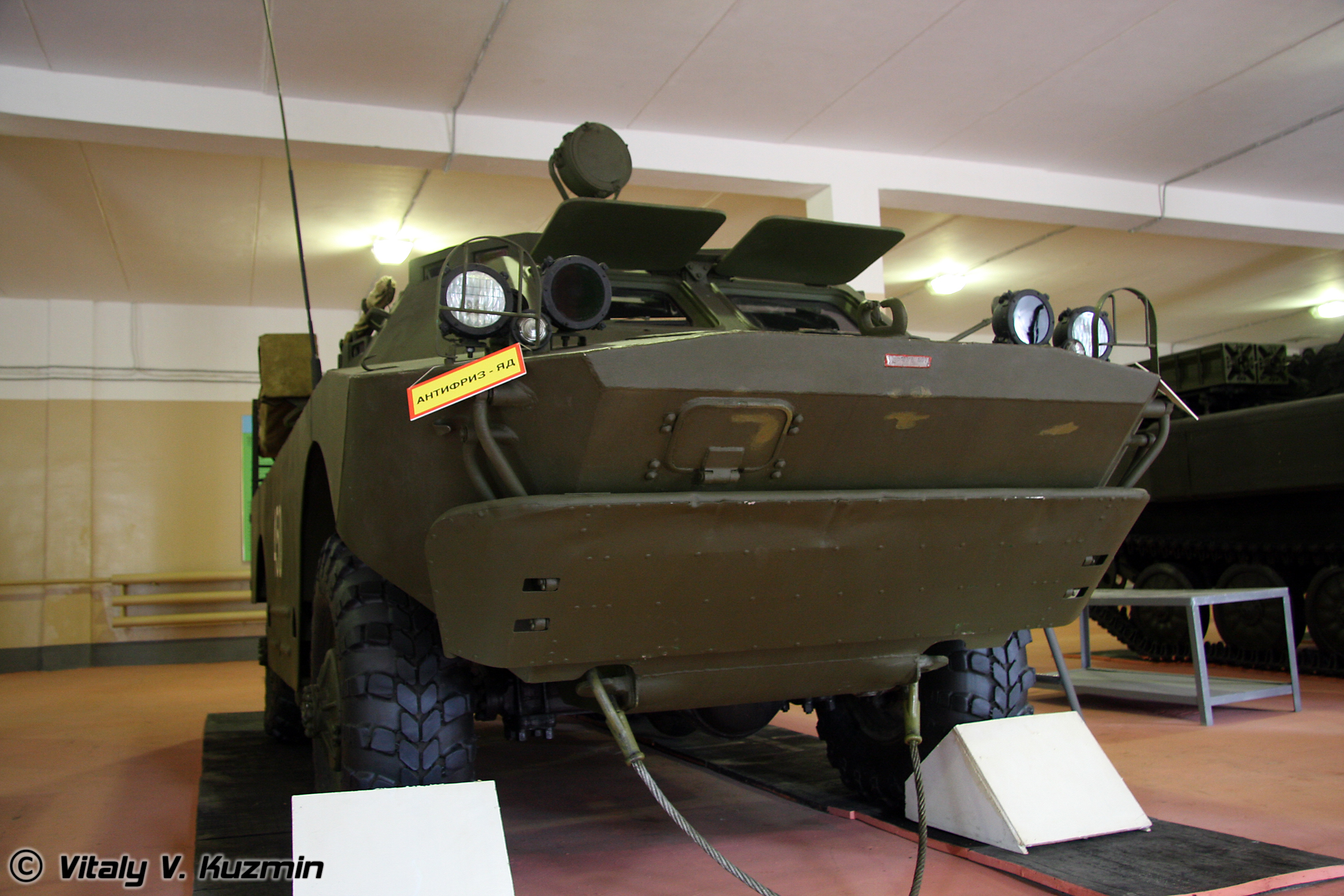

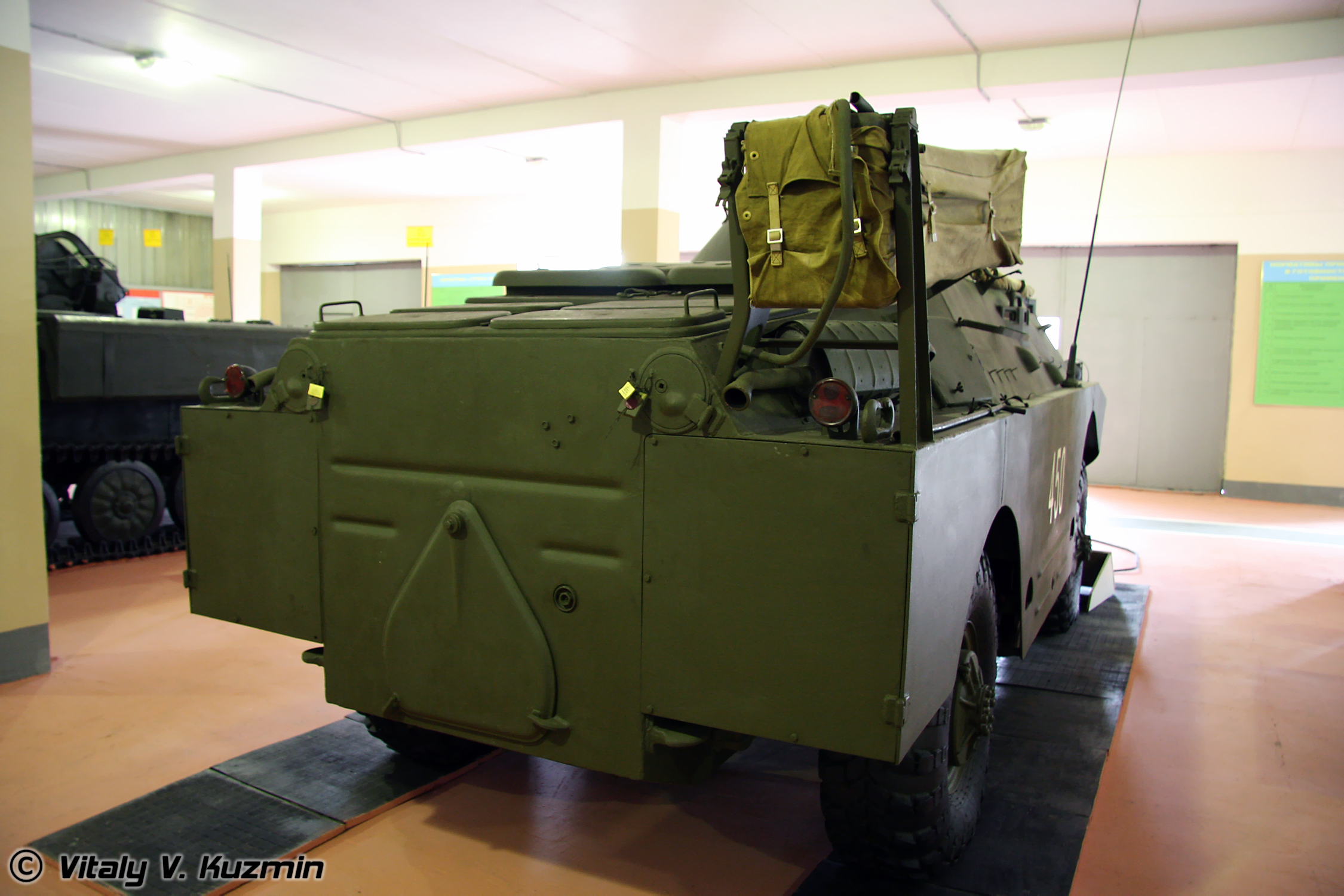

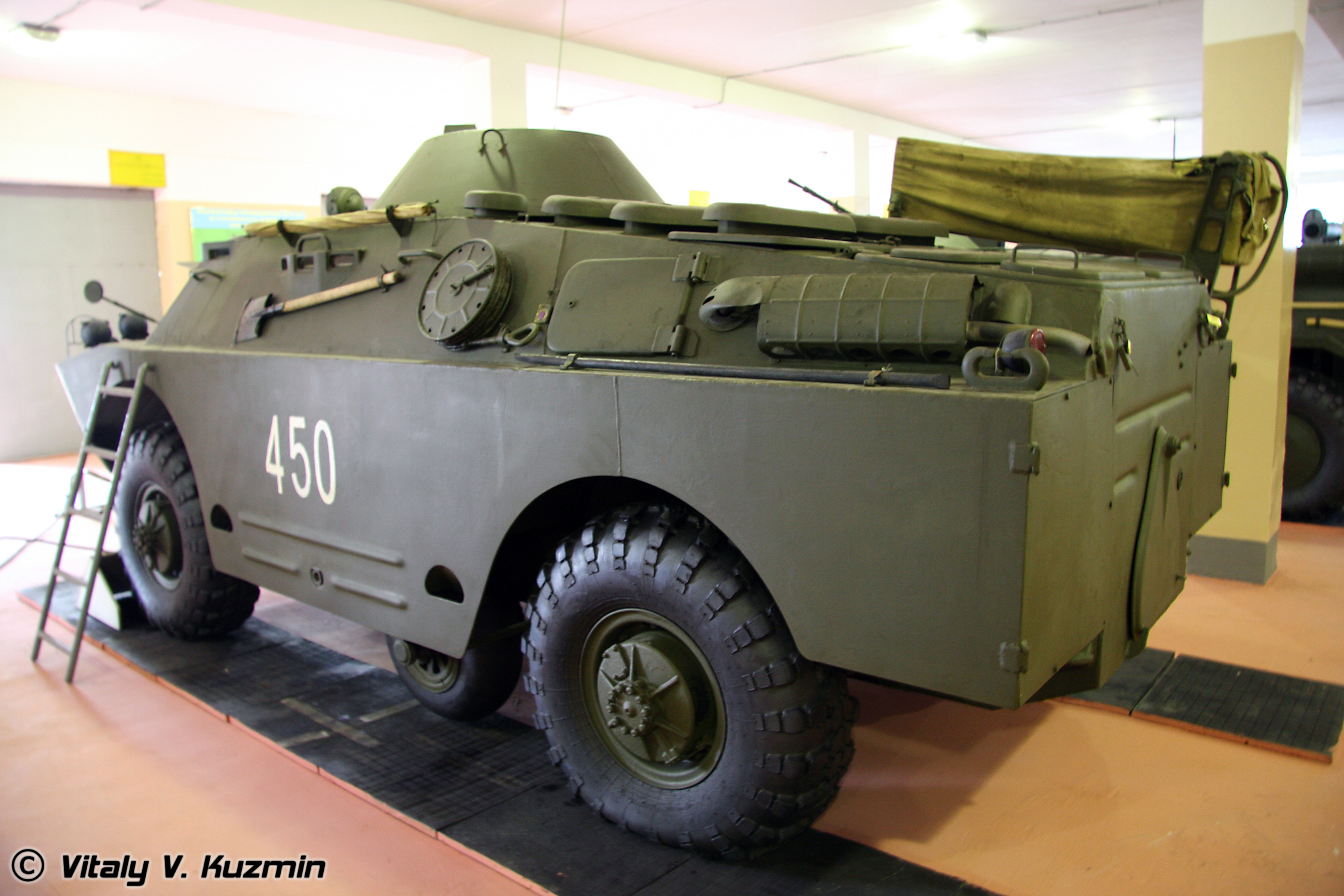

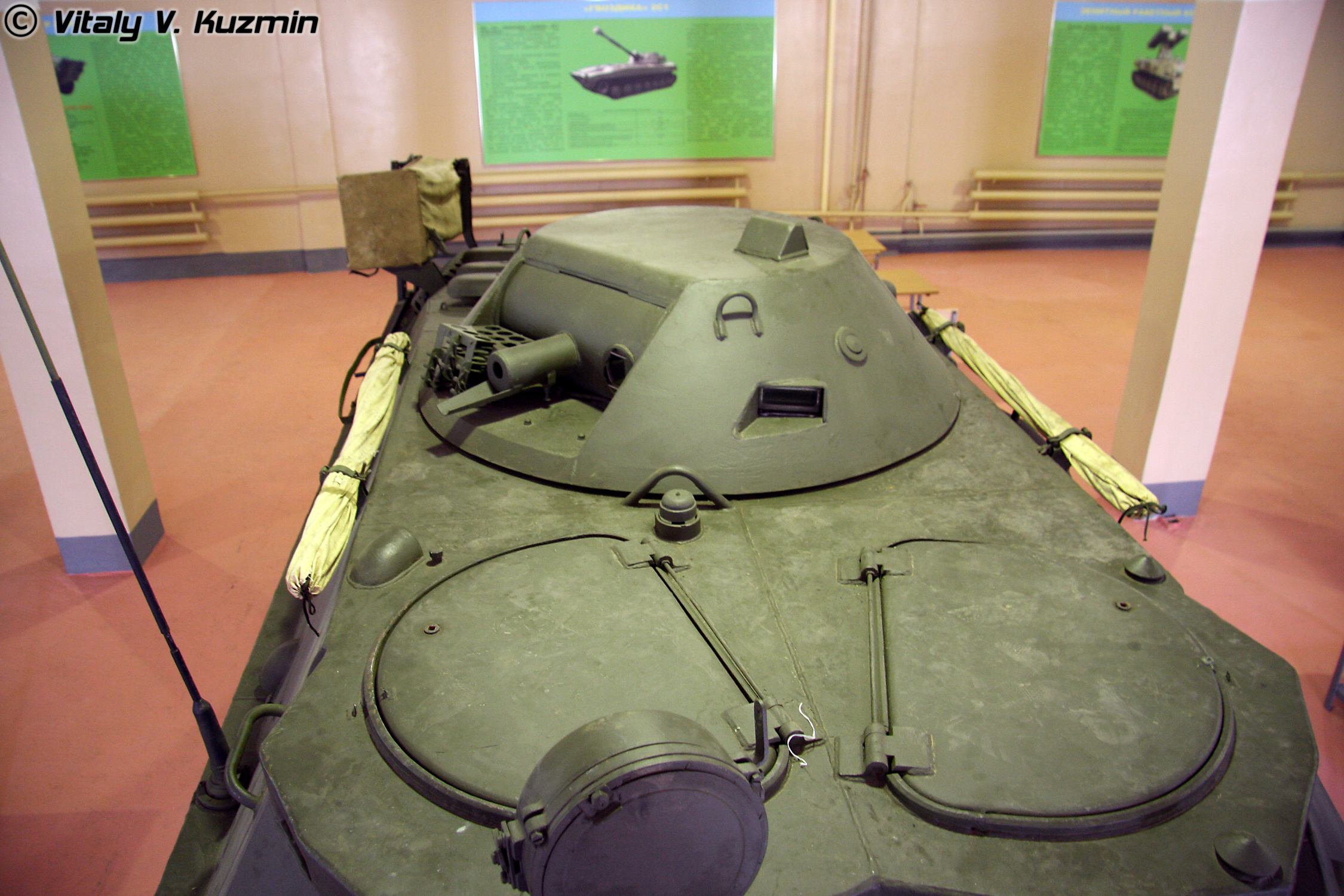

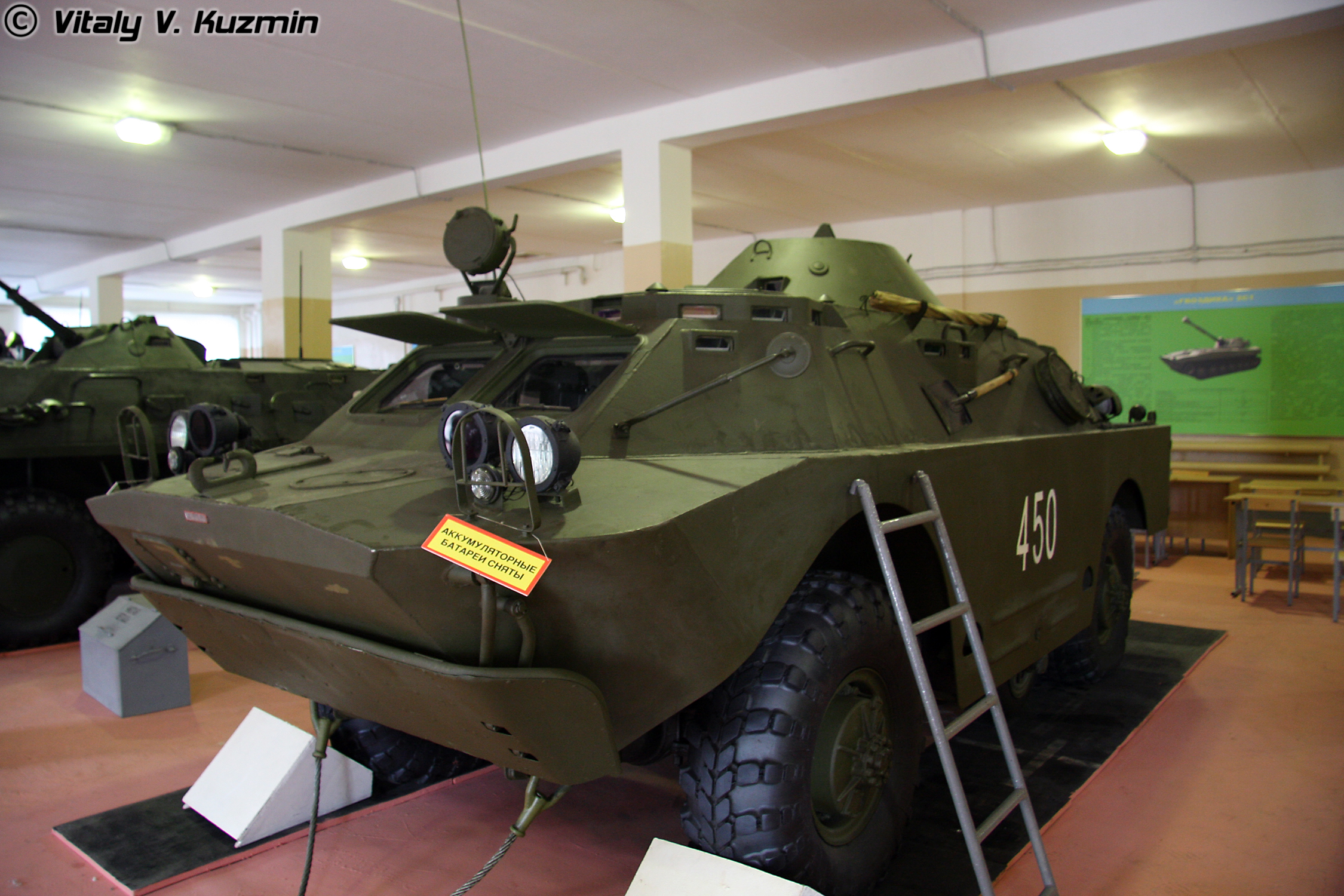

            9K35 Strela-10

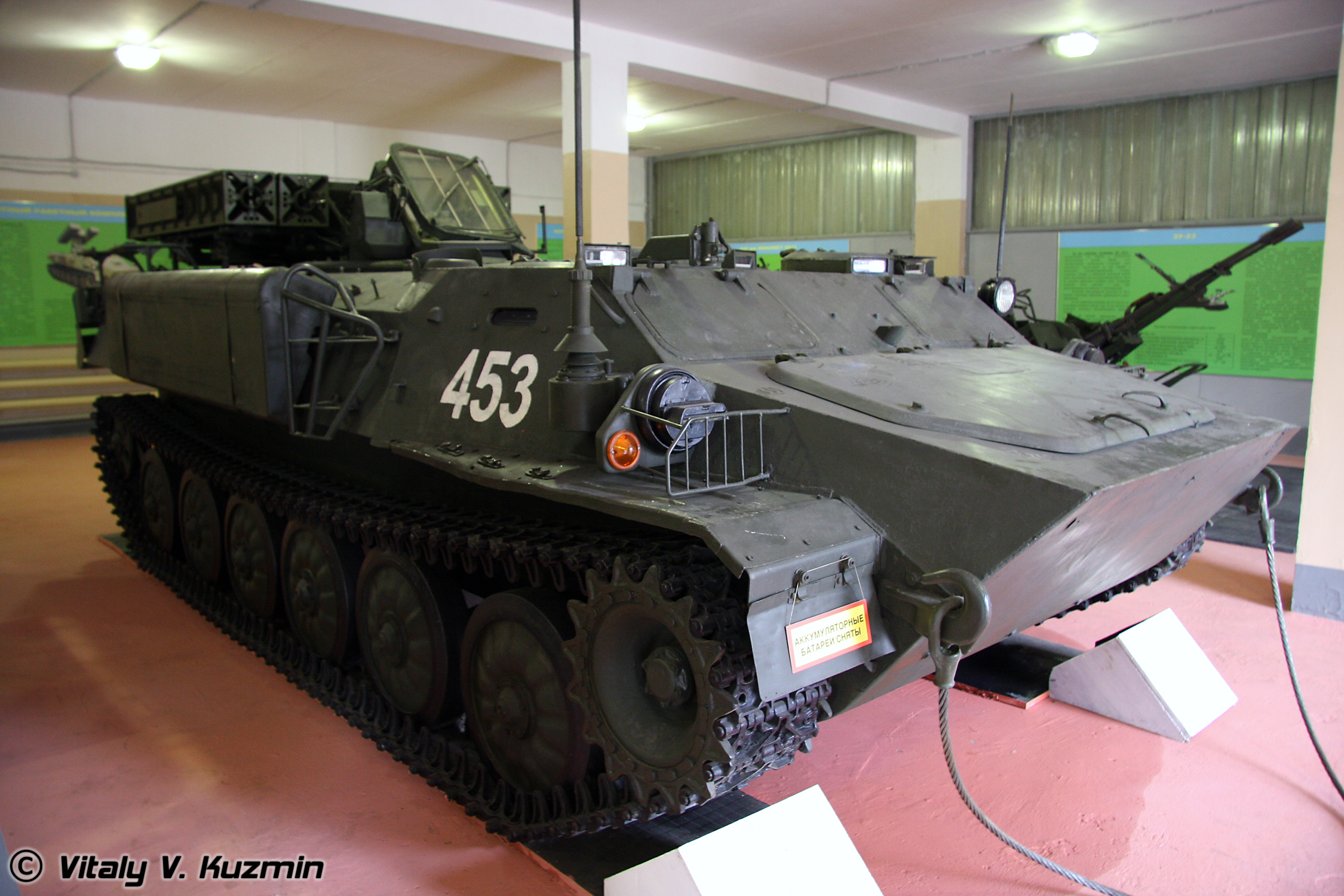

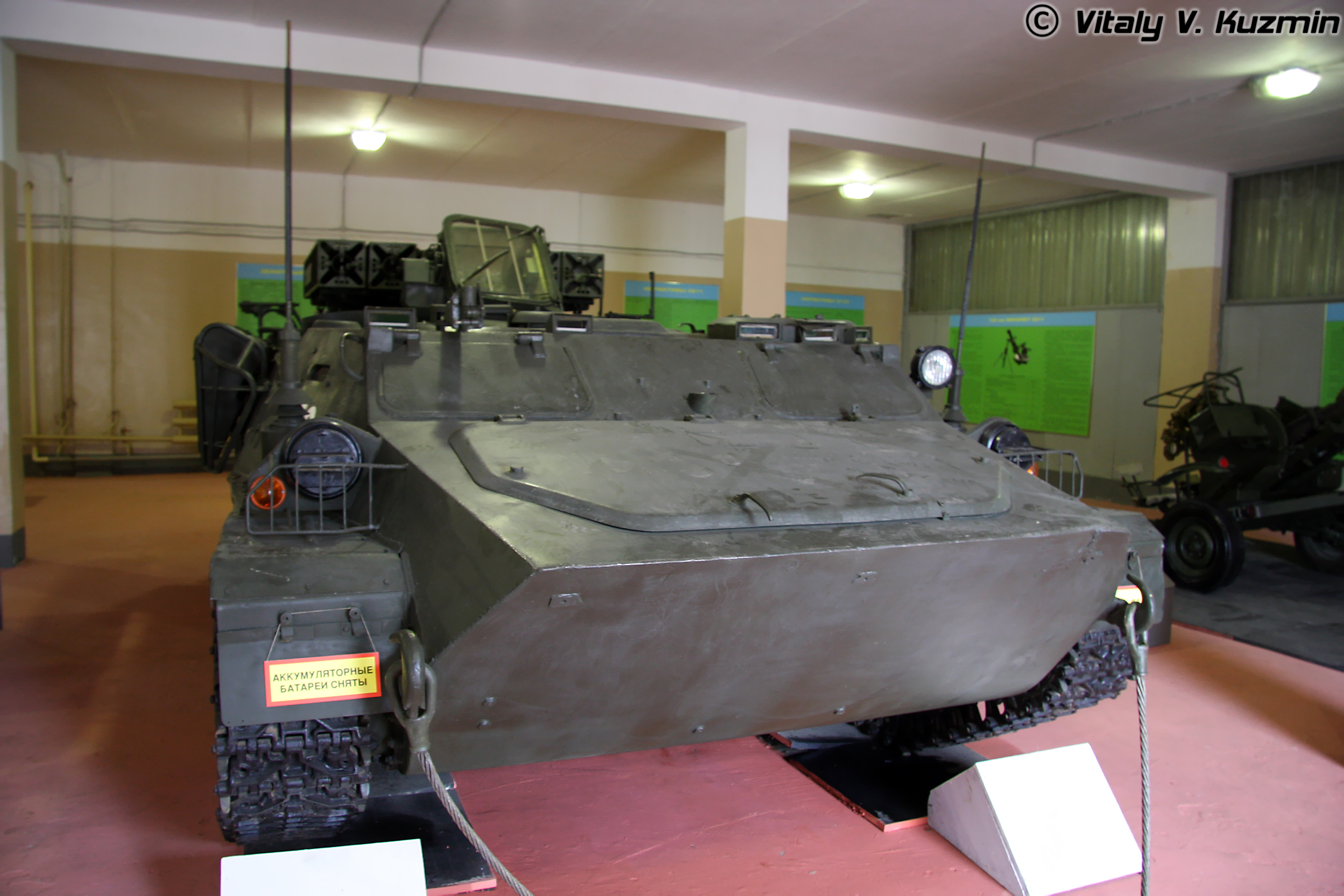

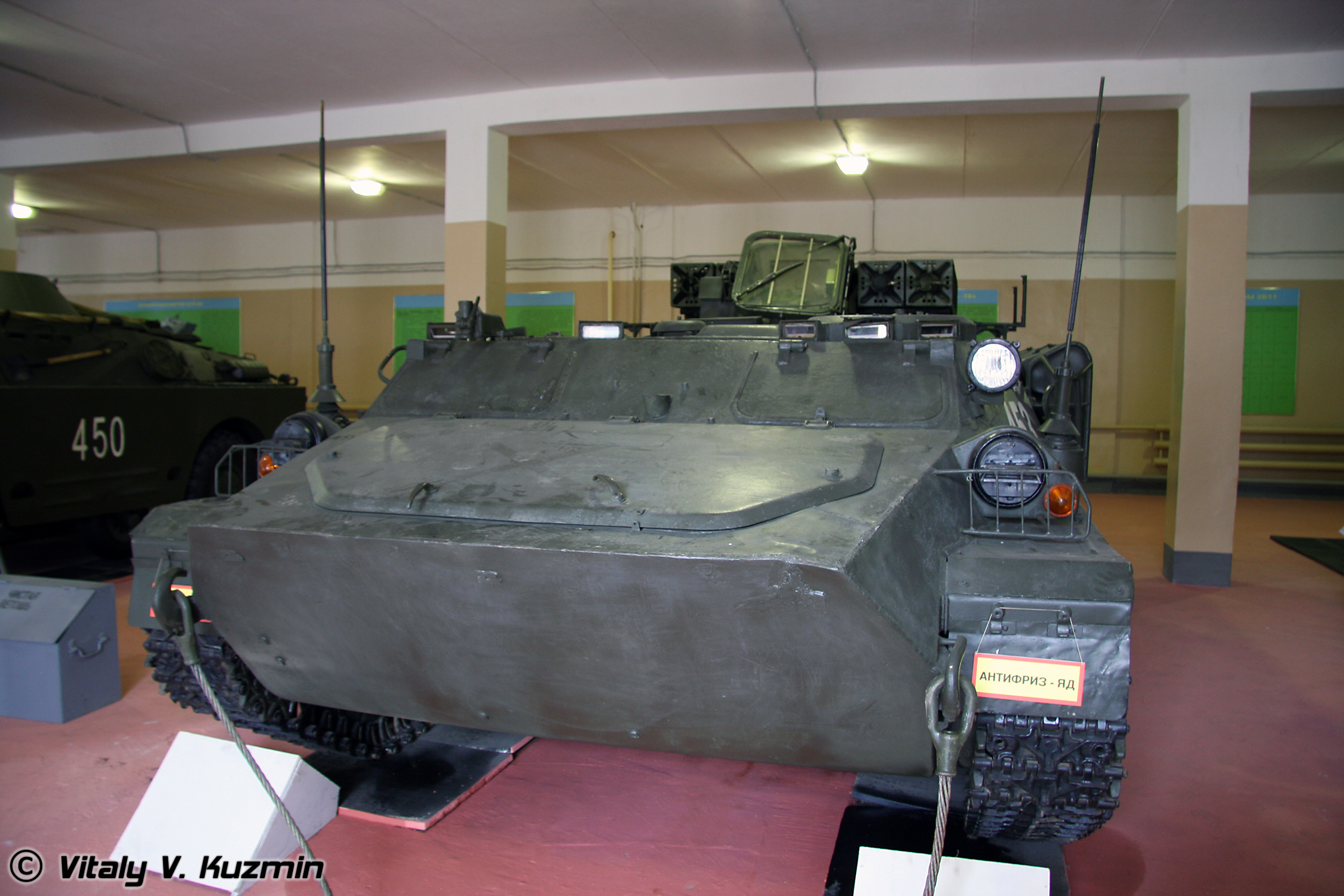

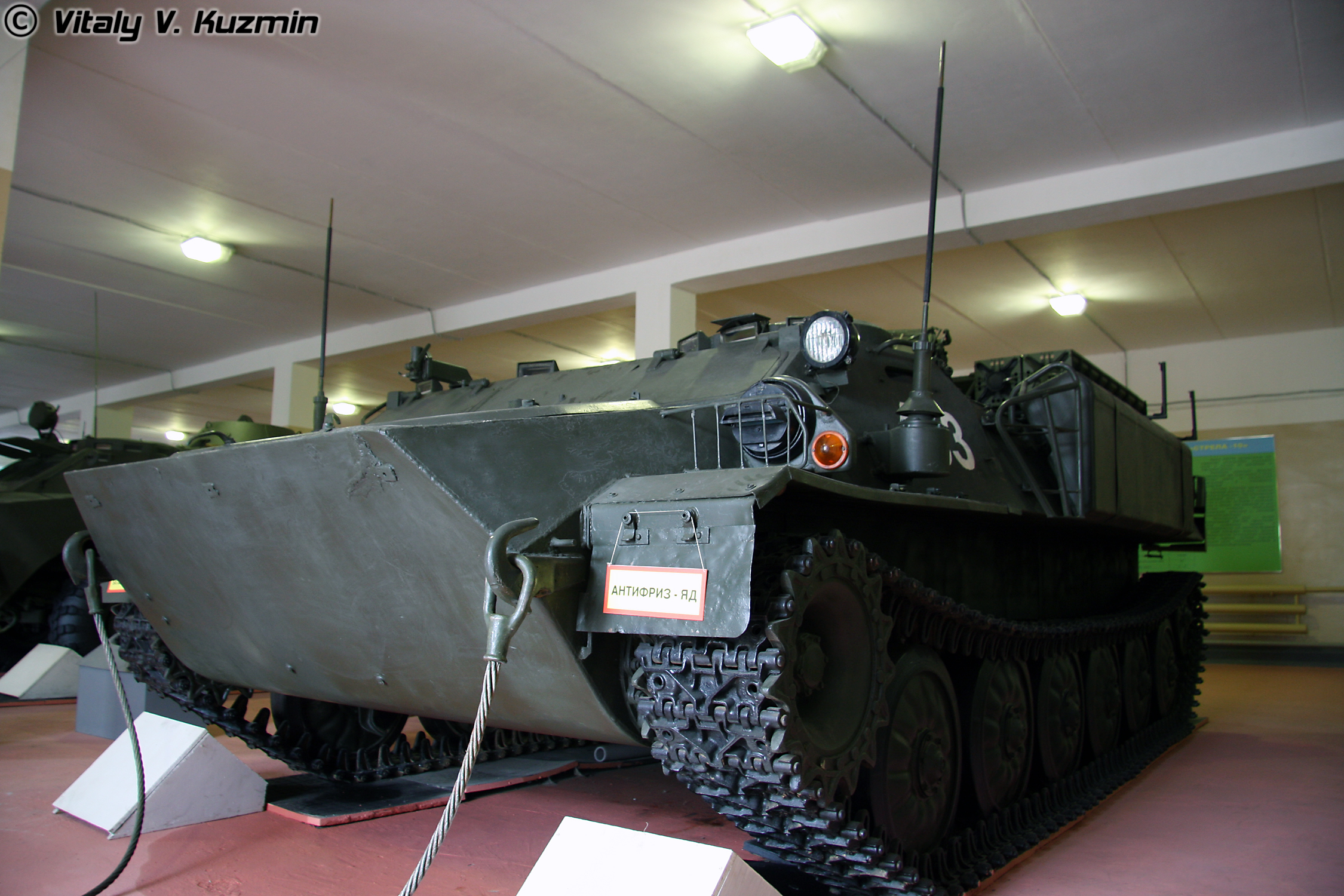

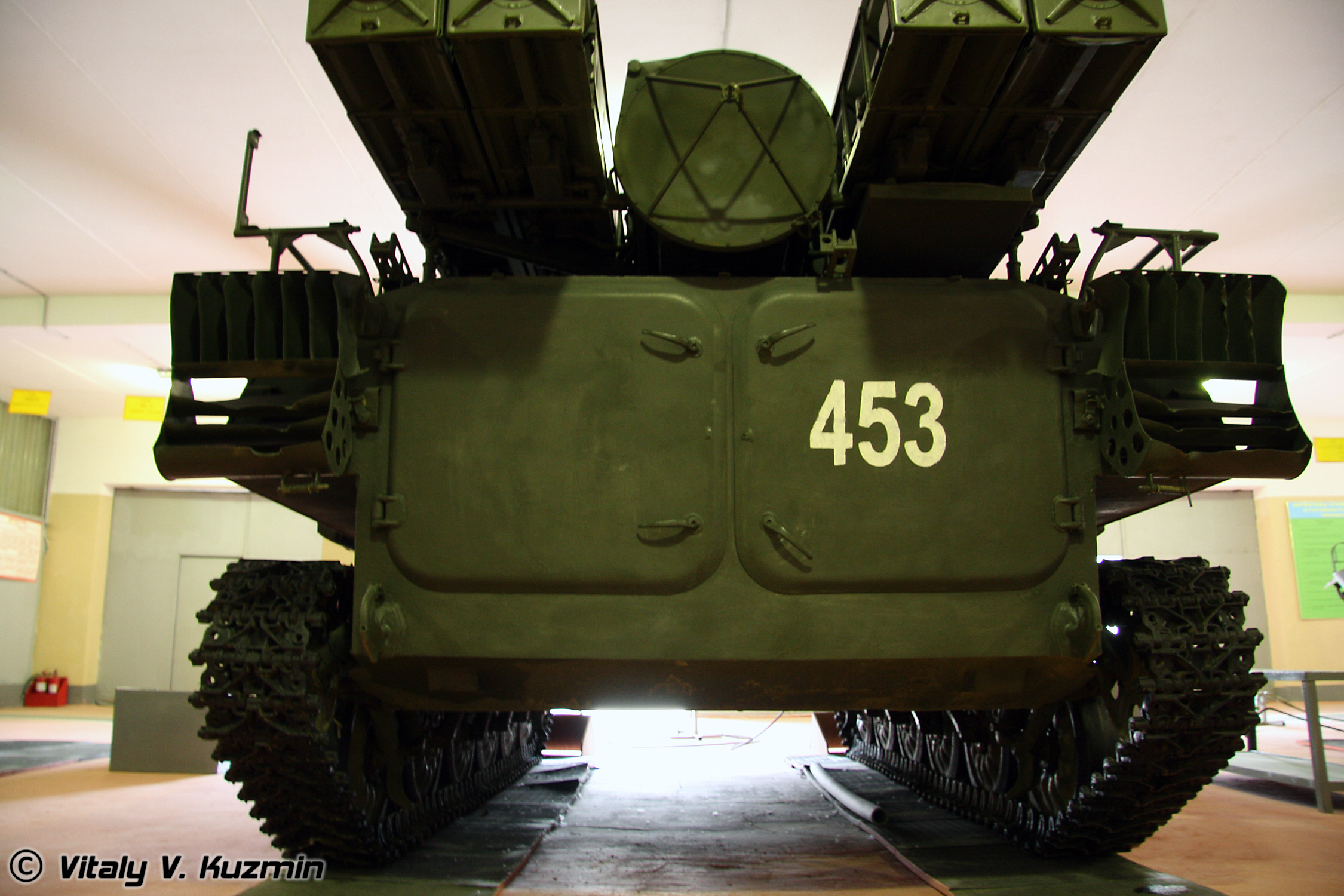

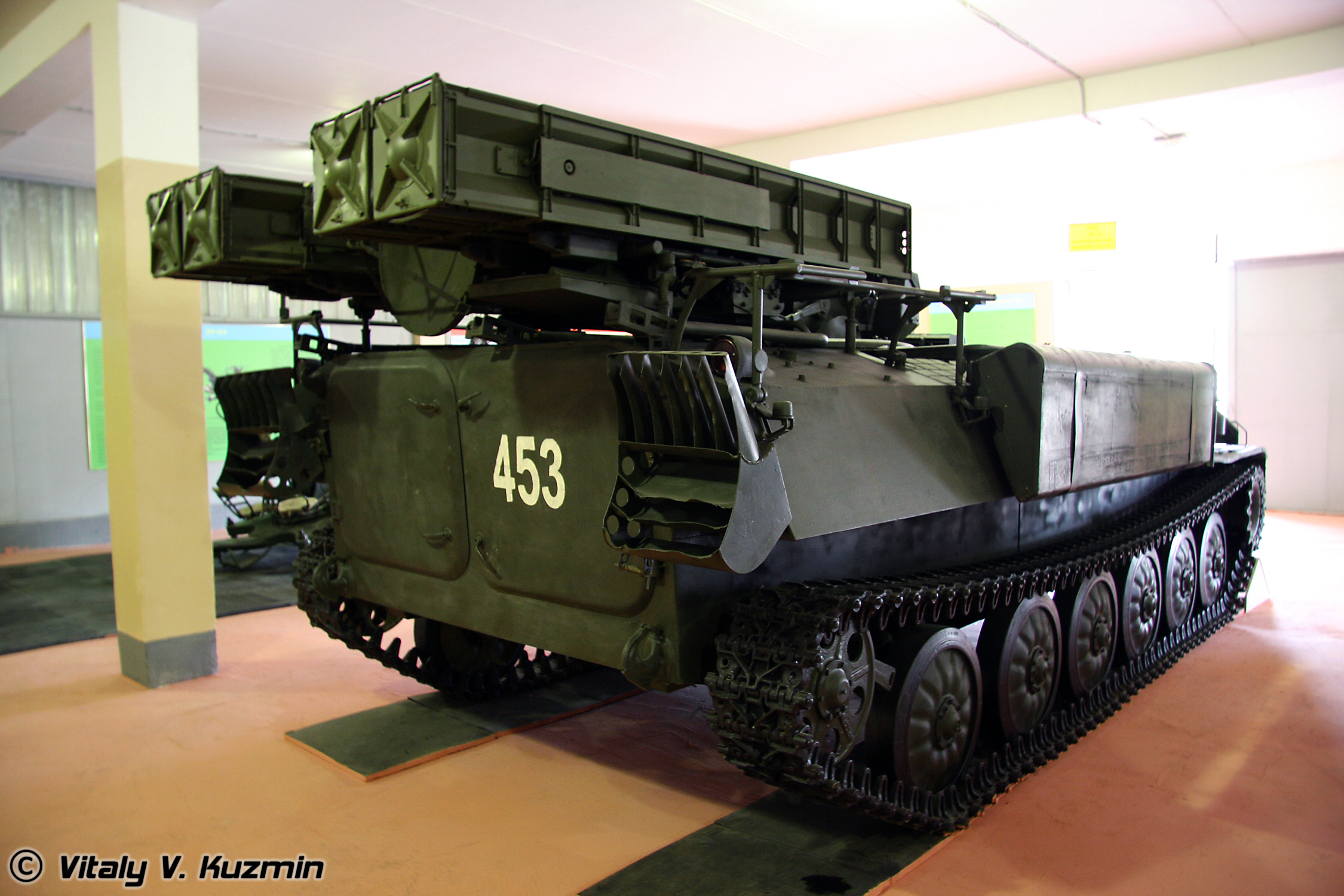

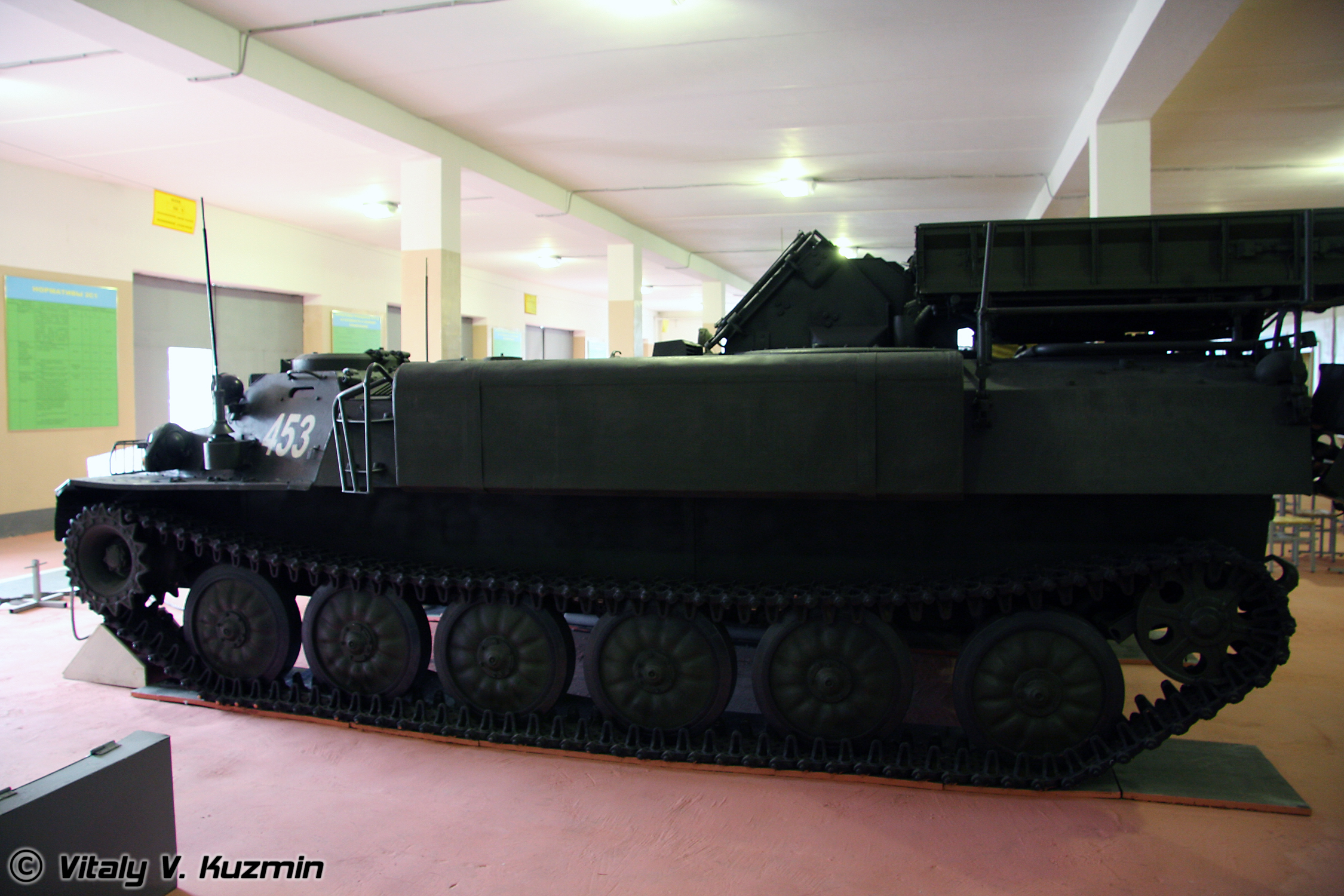

                ZU-23

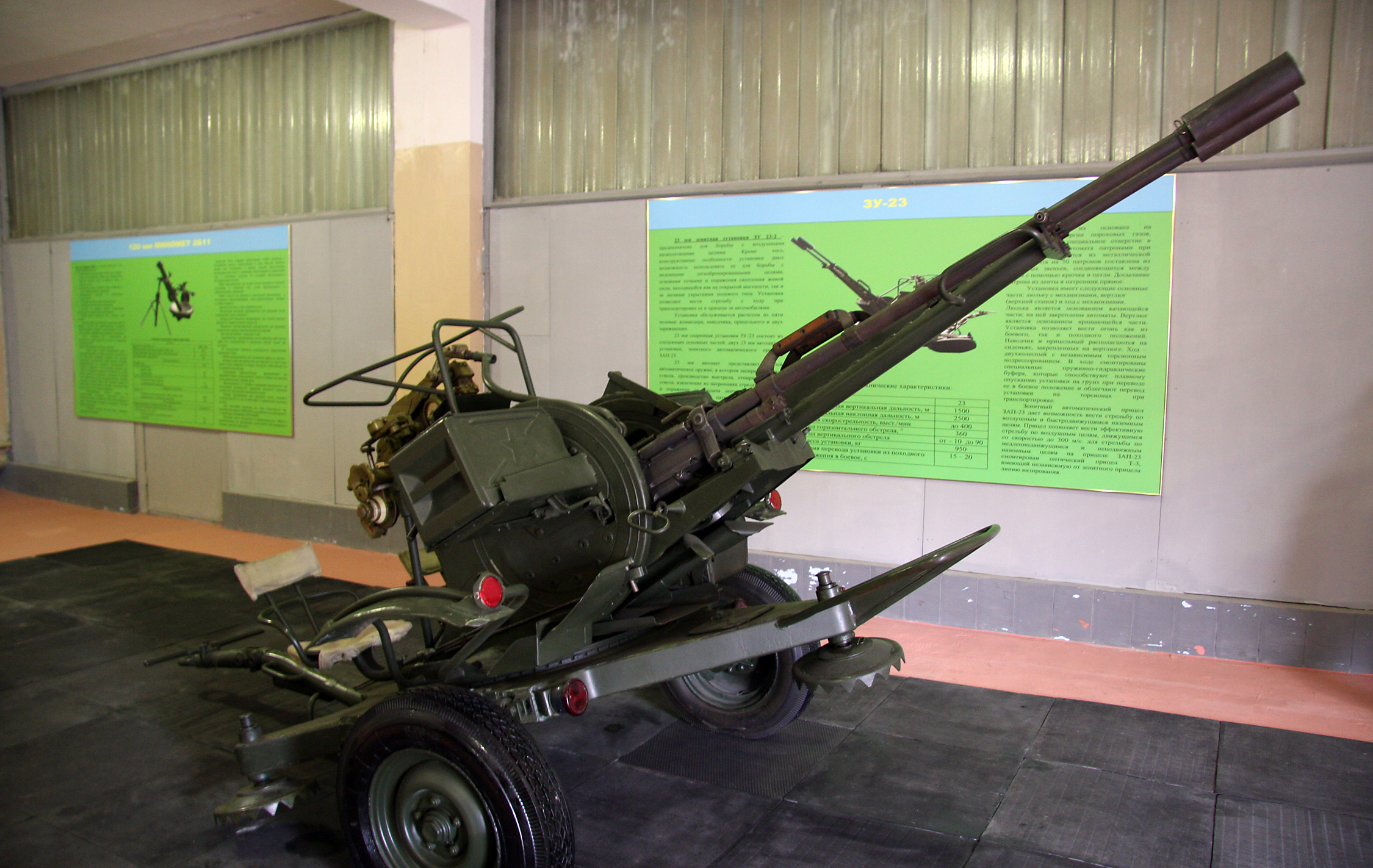

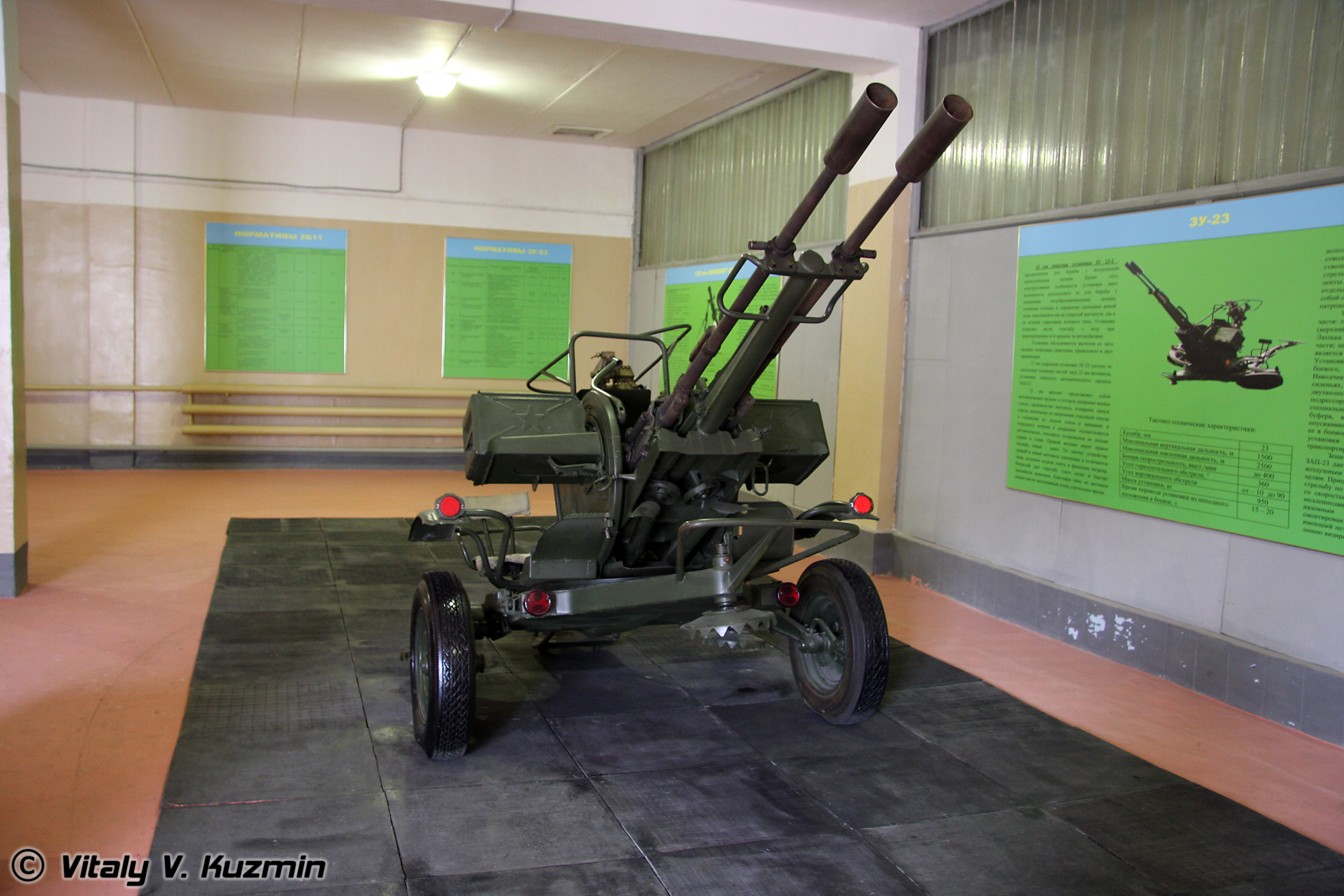

        R-166-0.5 radio station
           (Based on BTR-80)

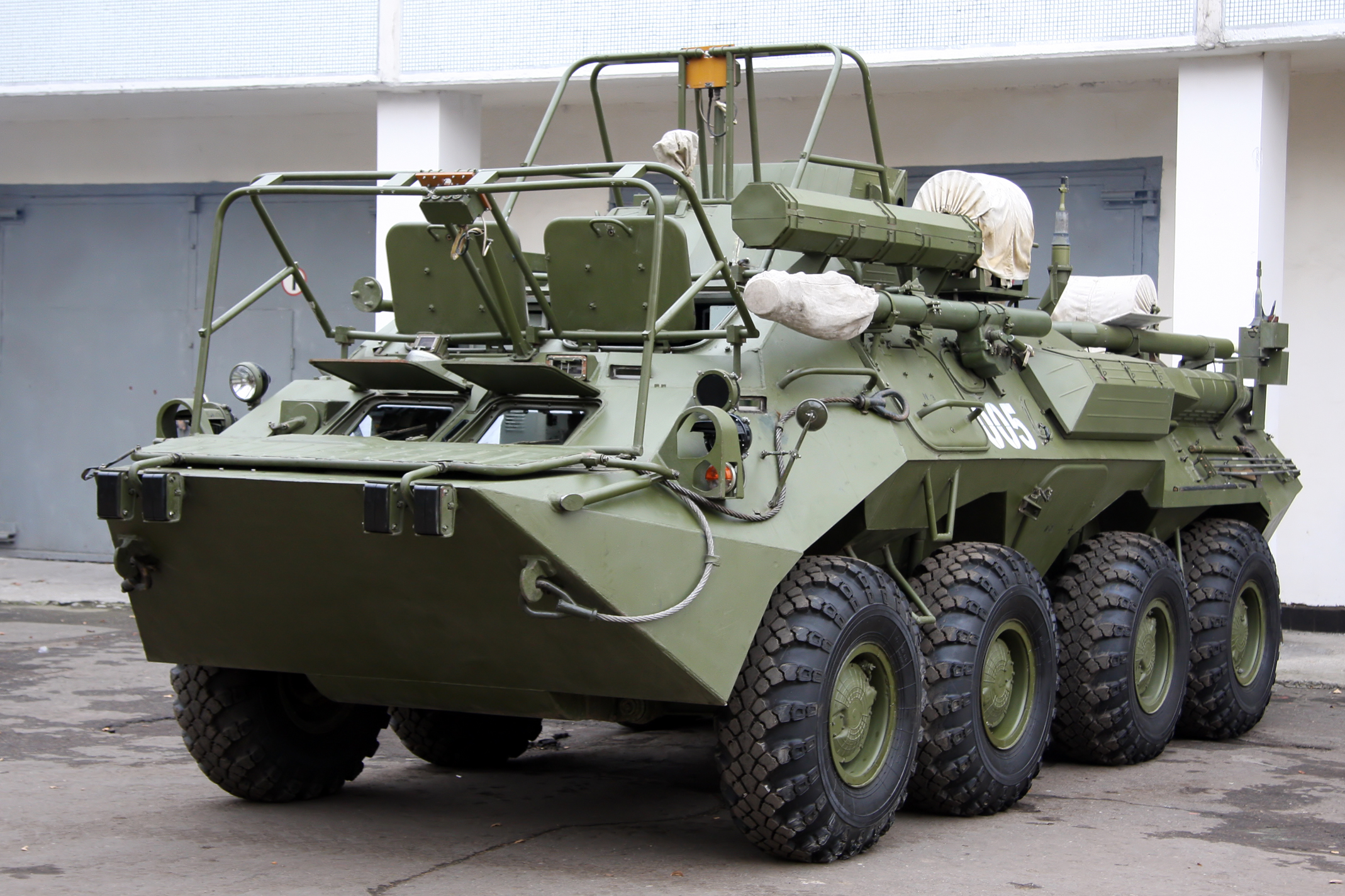

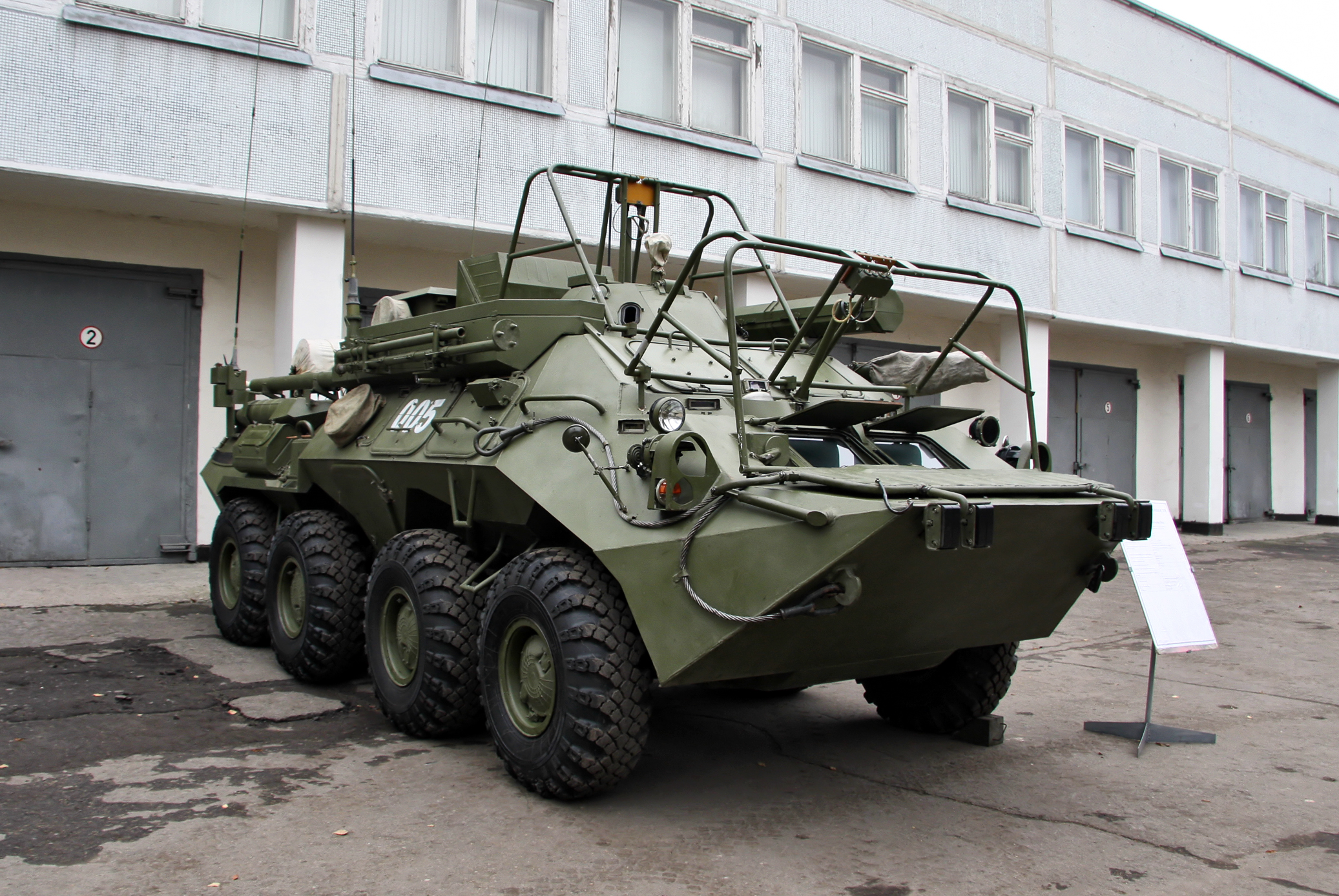

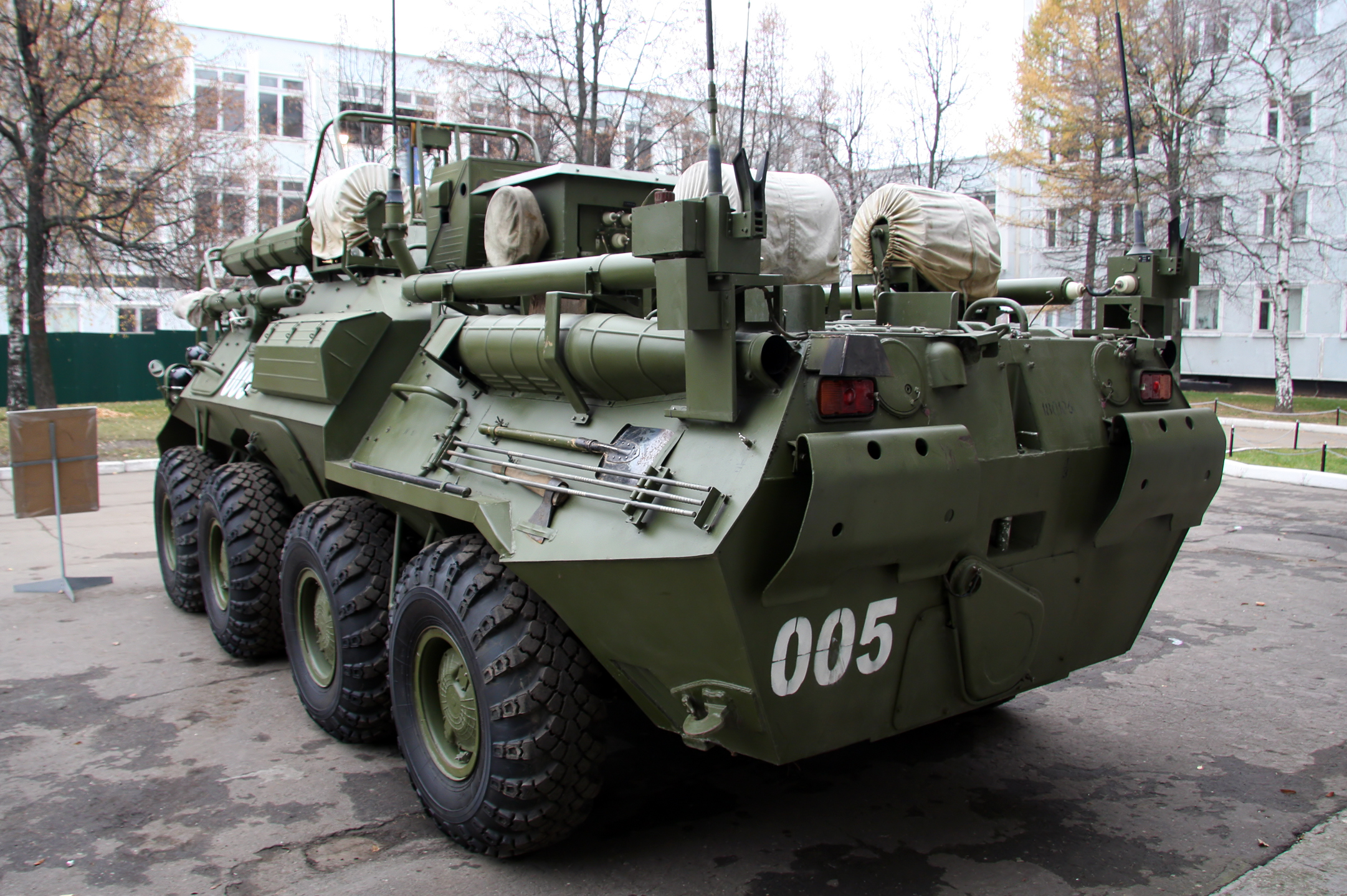

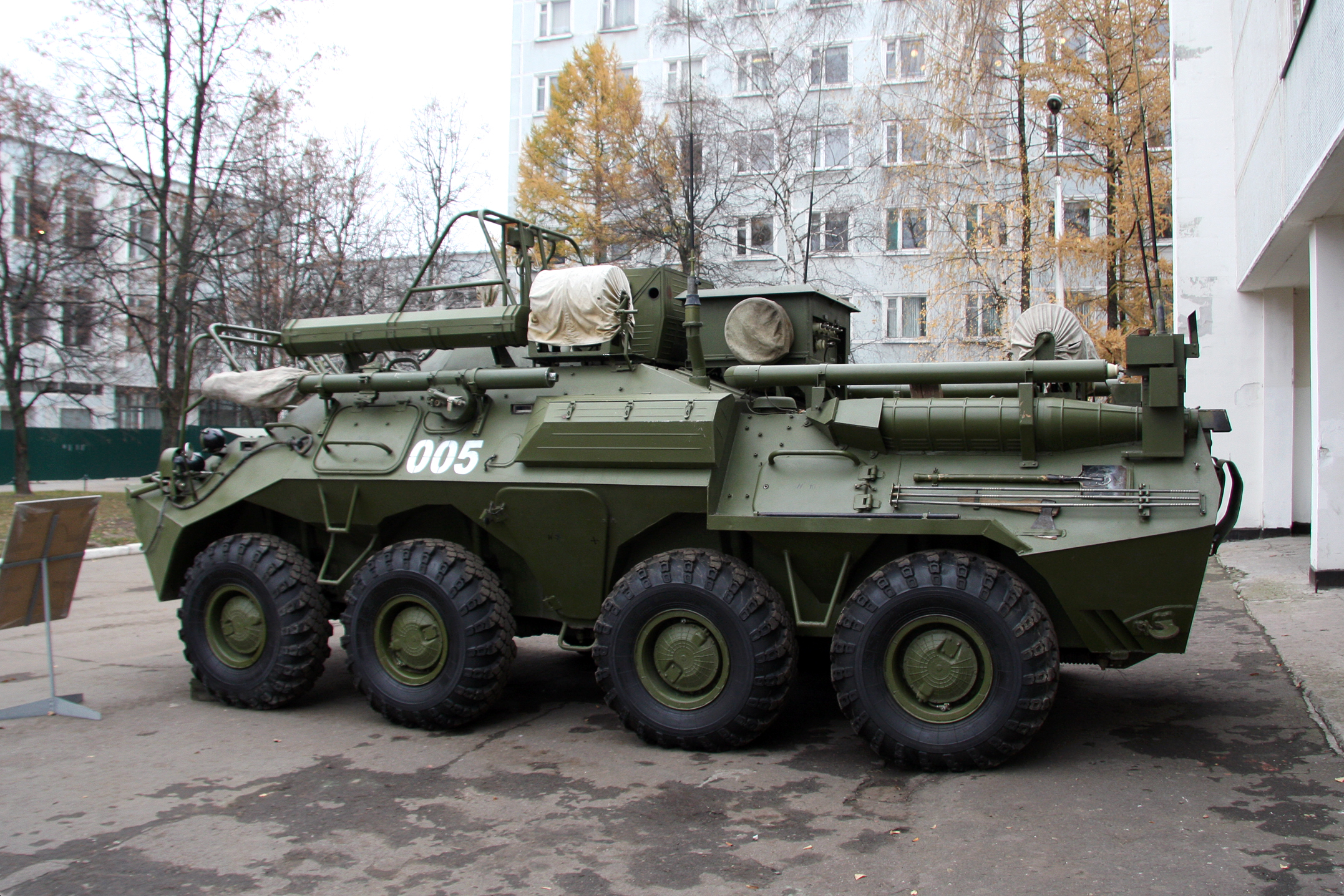

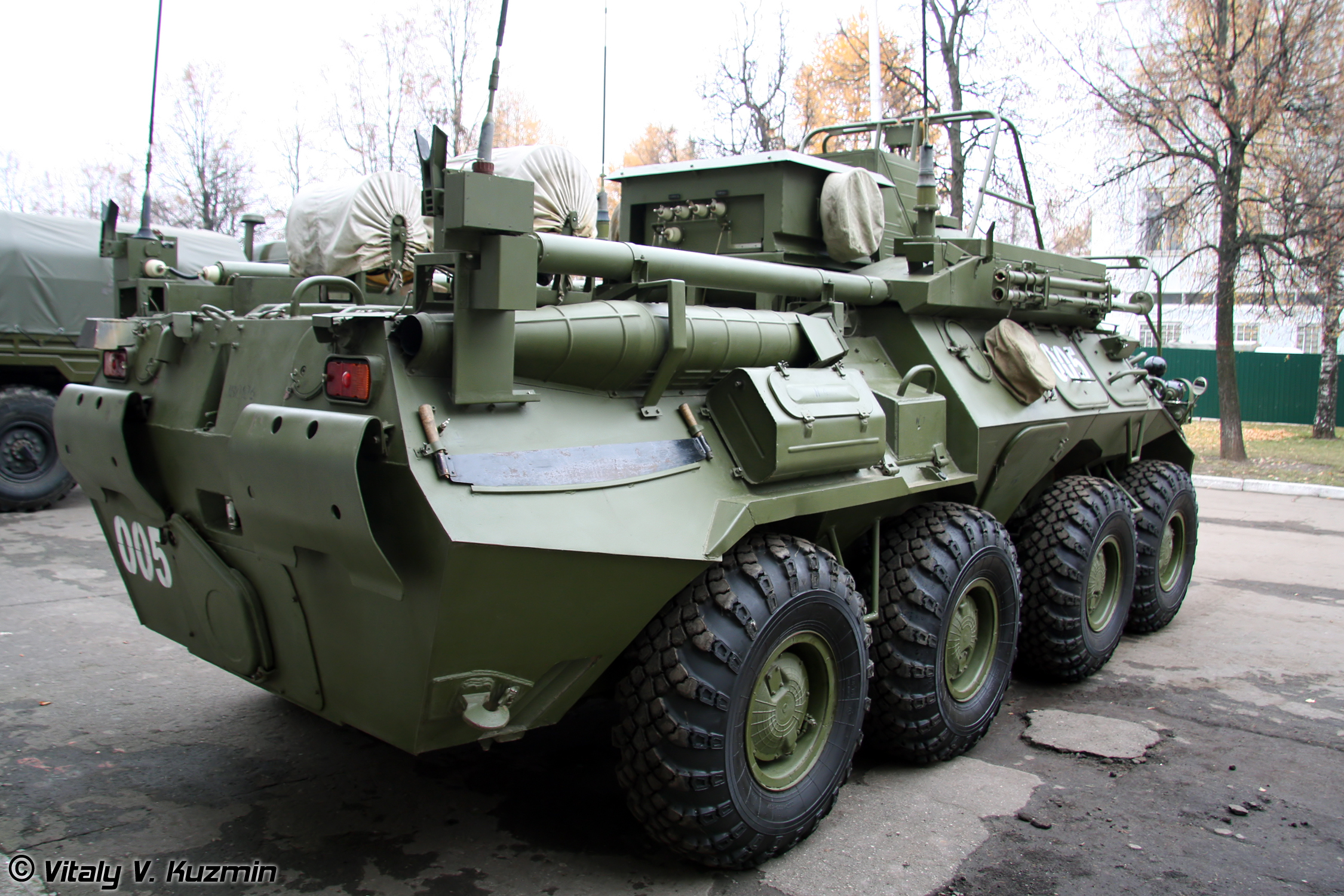

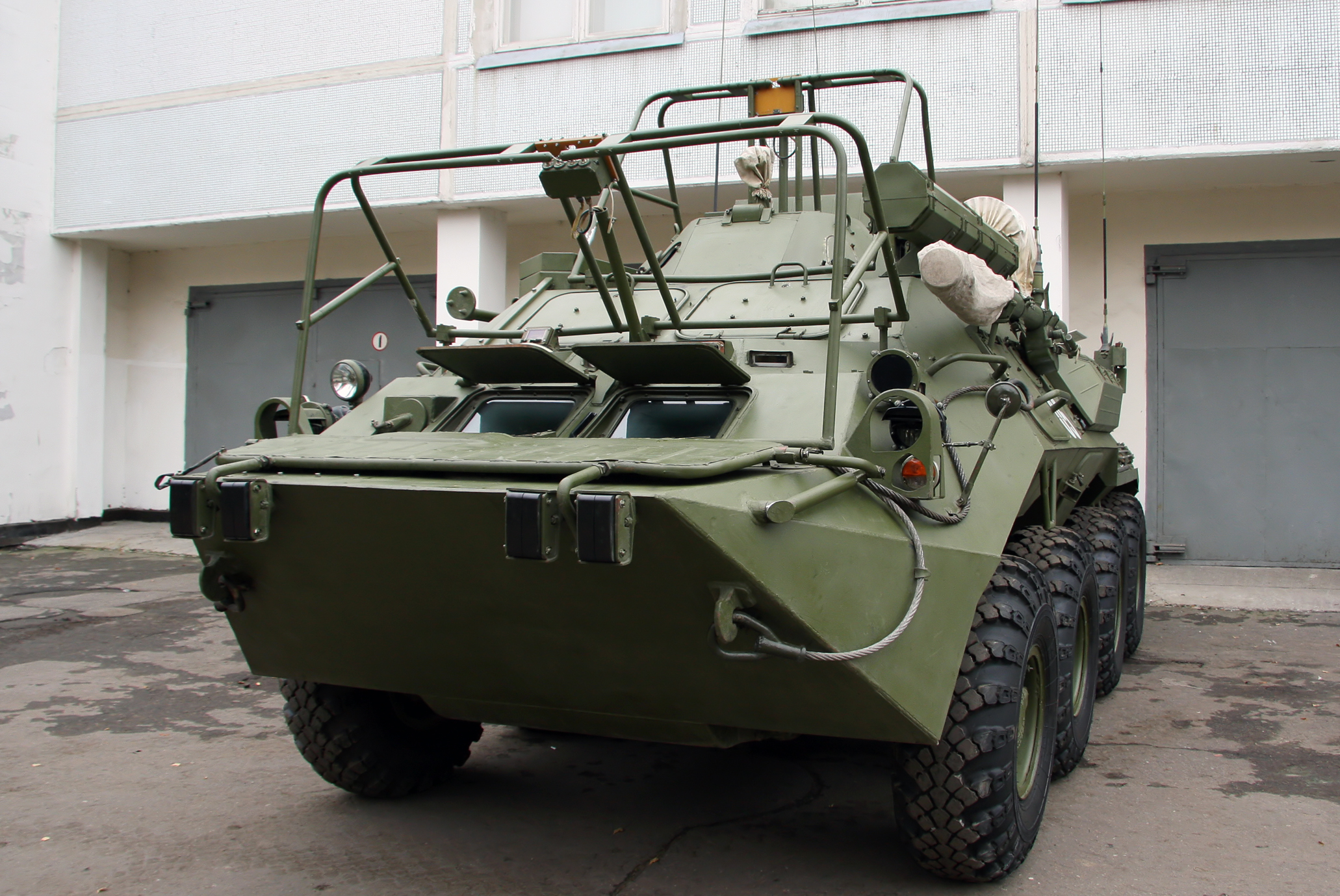

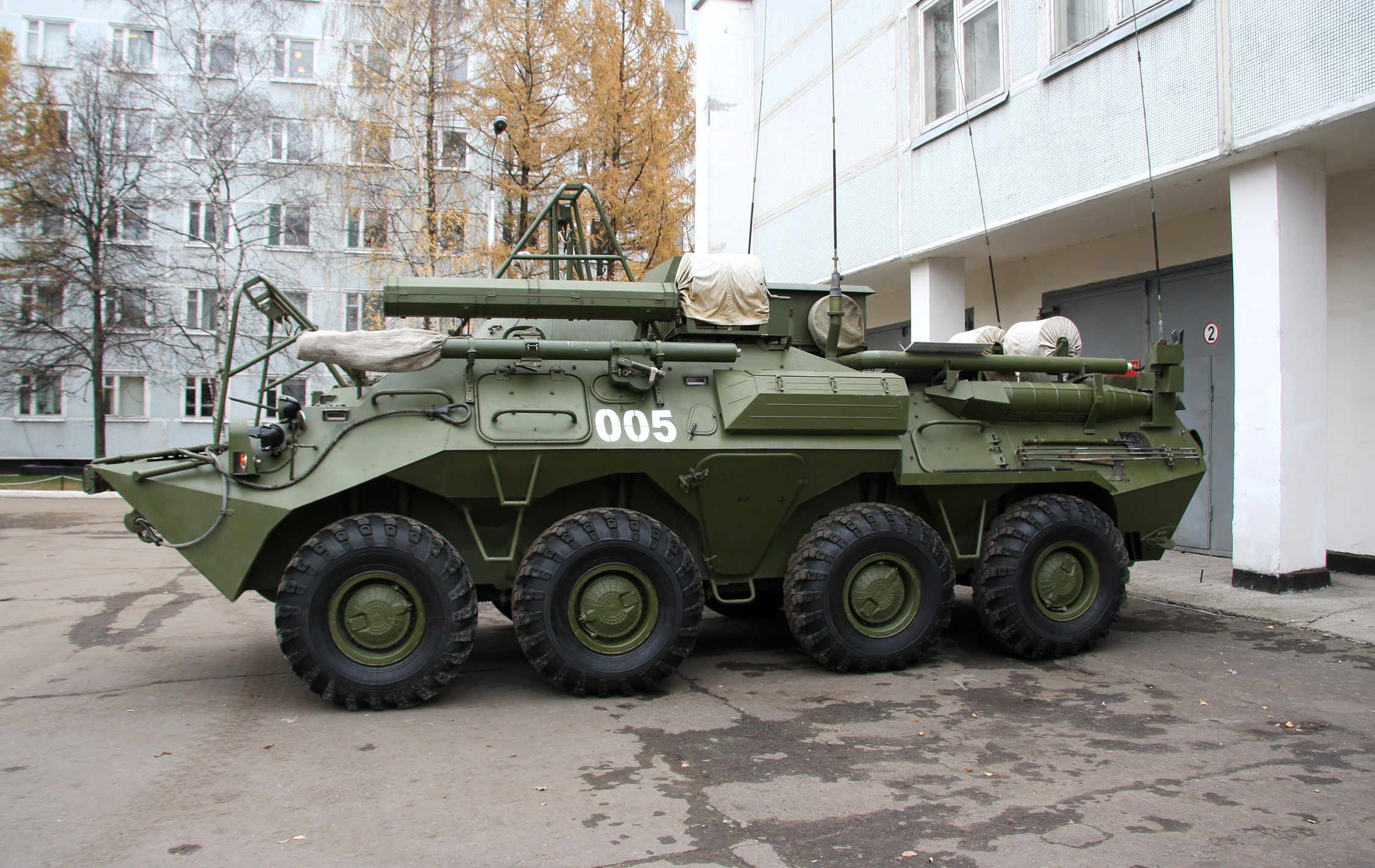

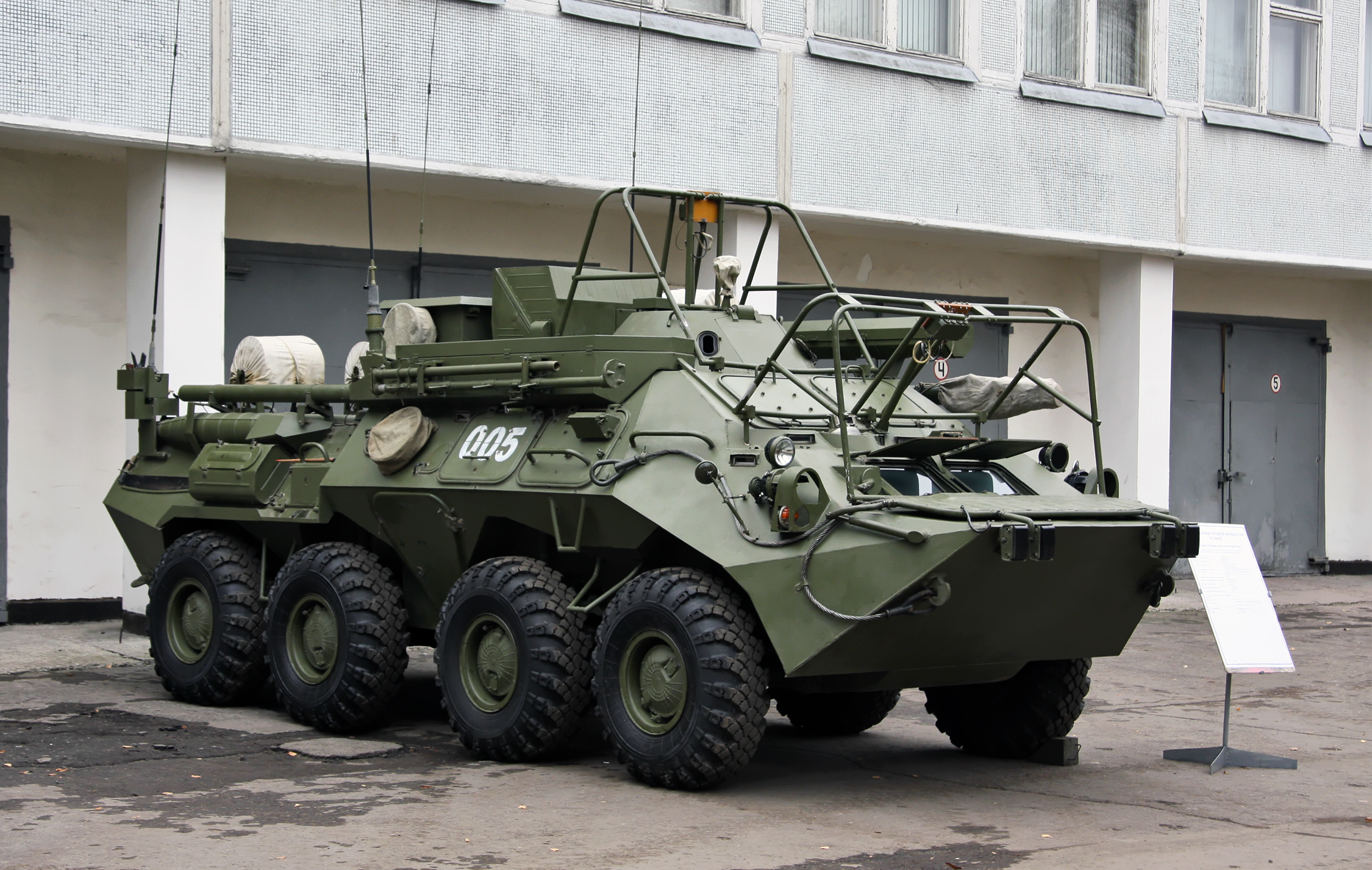

                BTR 80

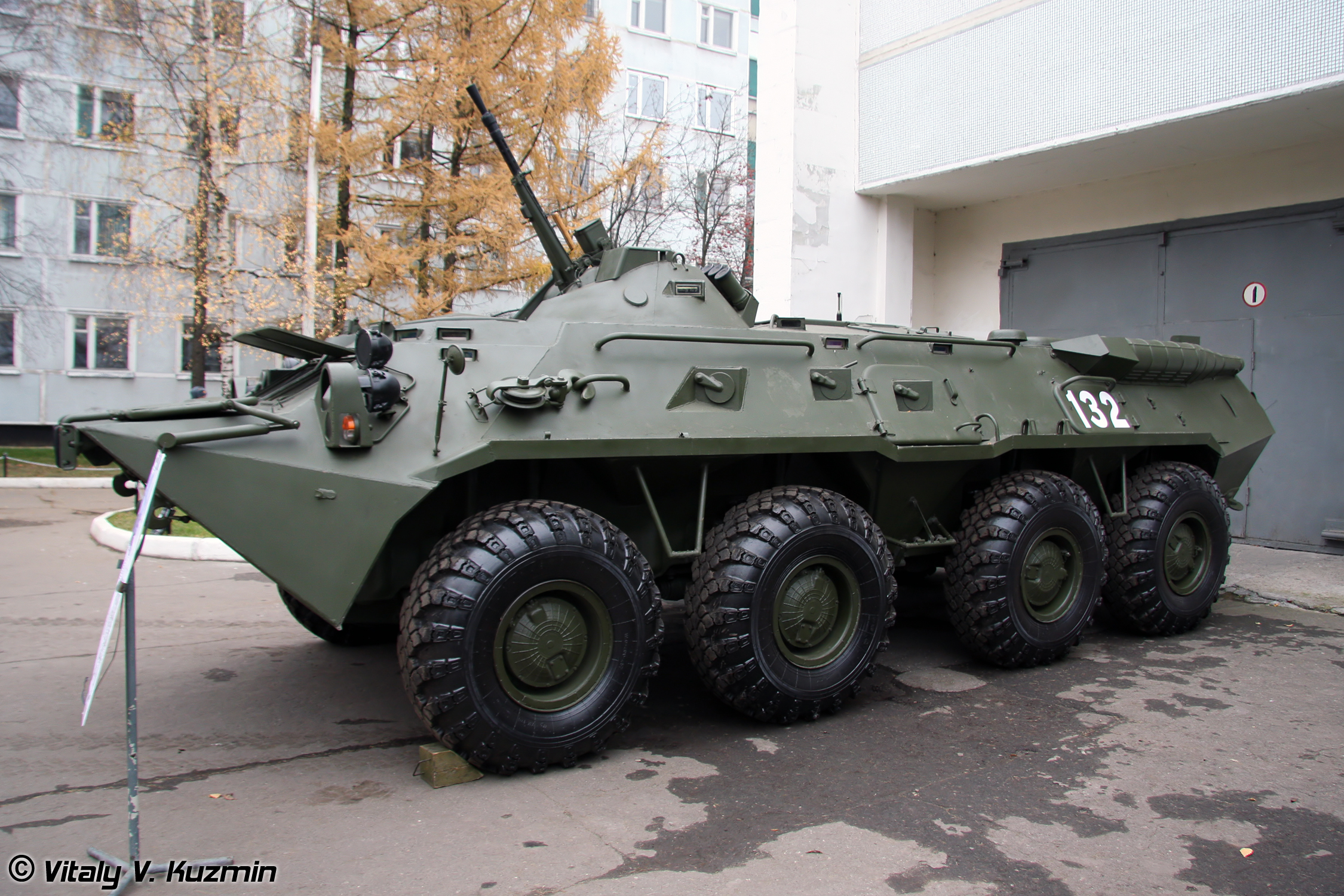

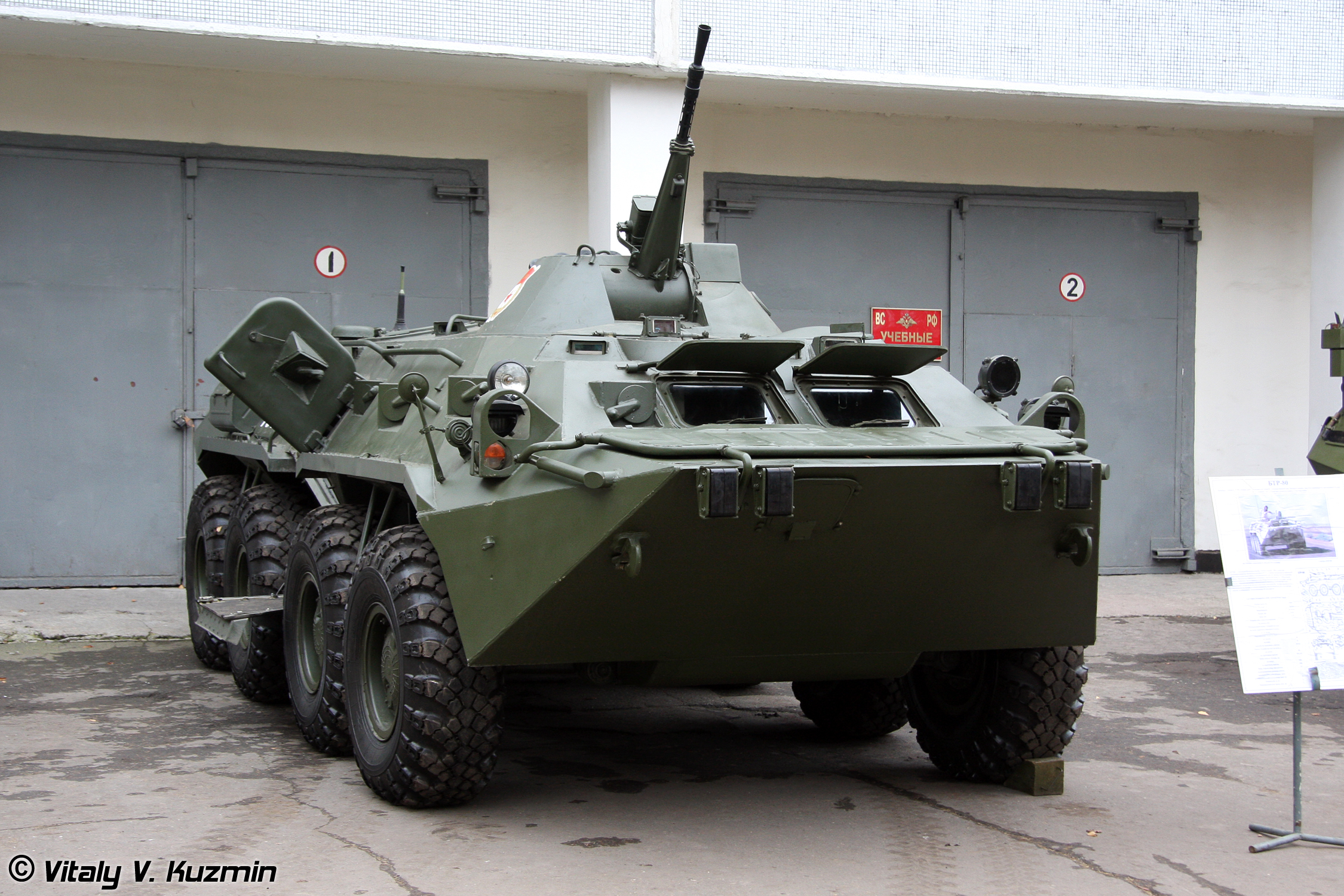

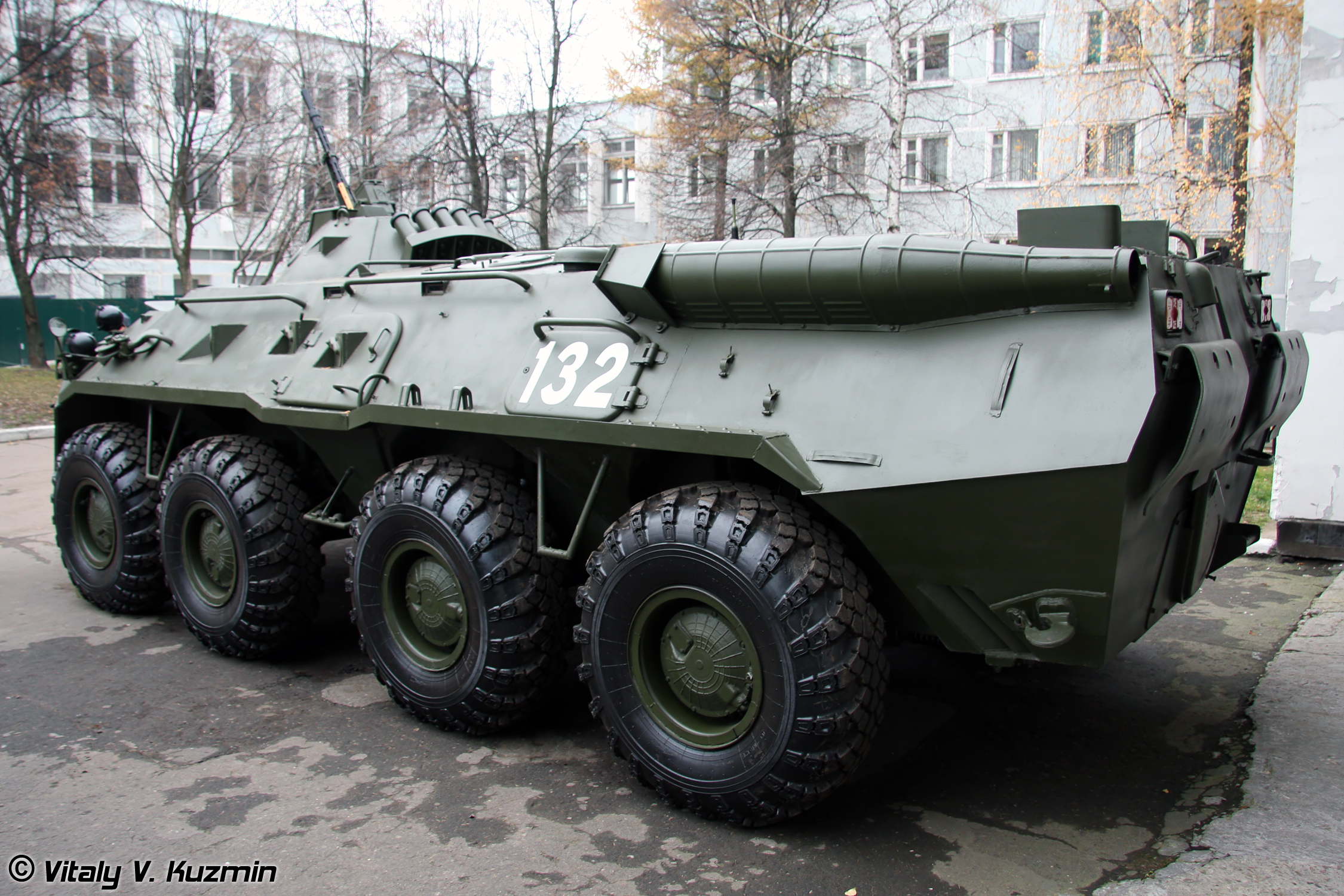

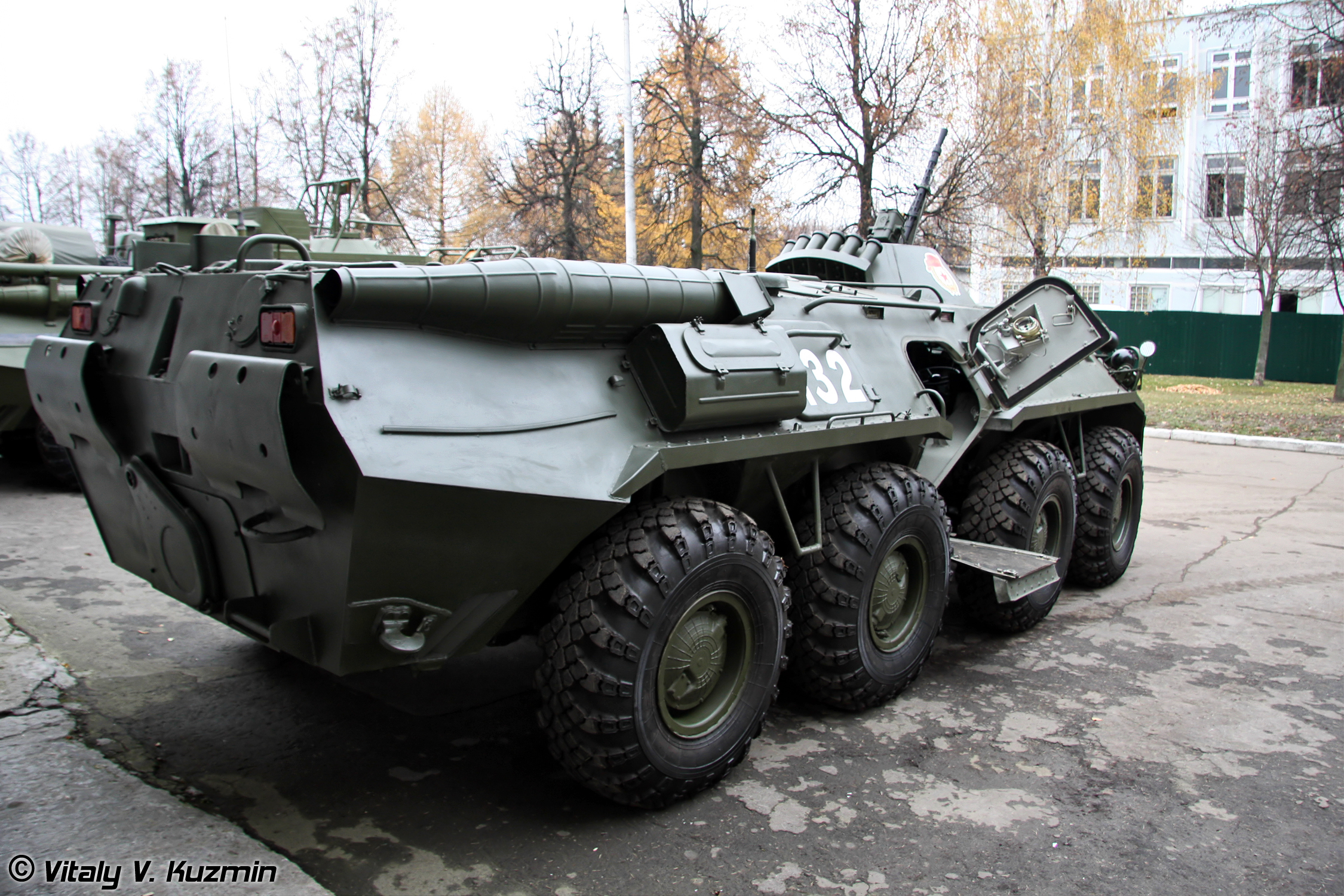

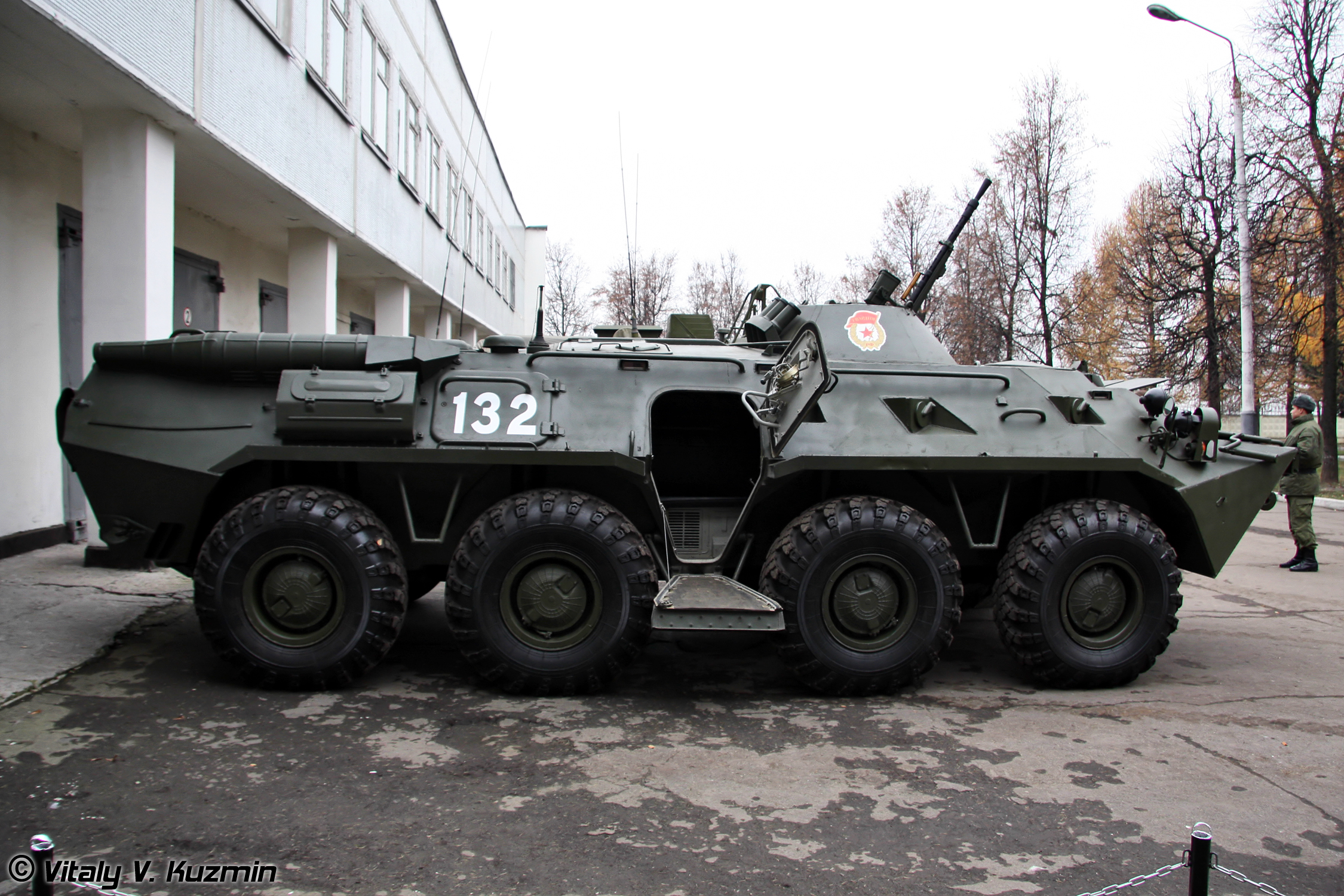

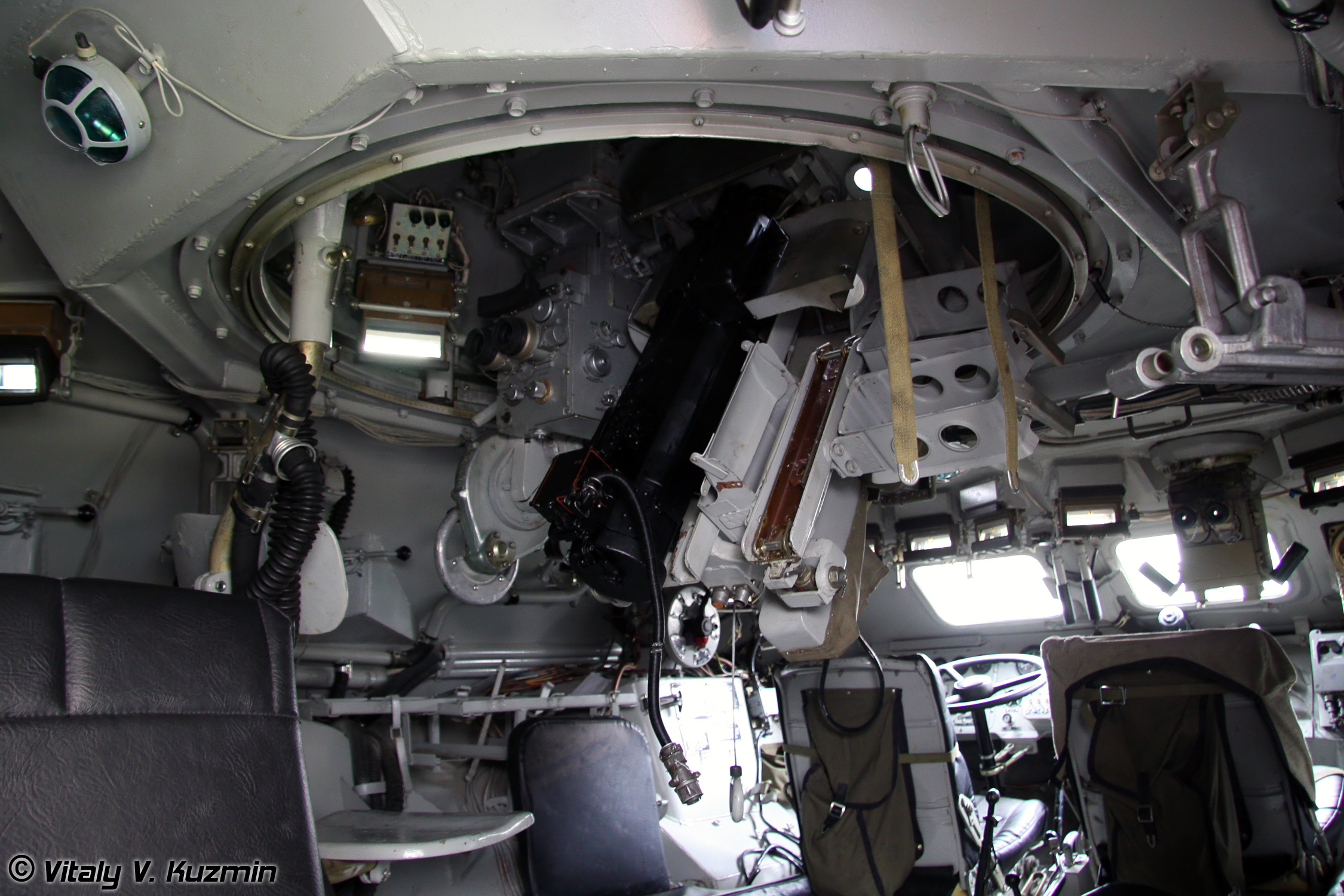

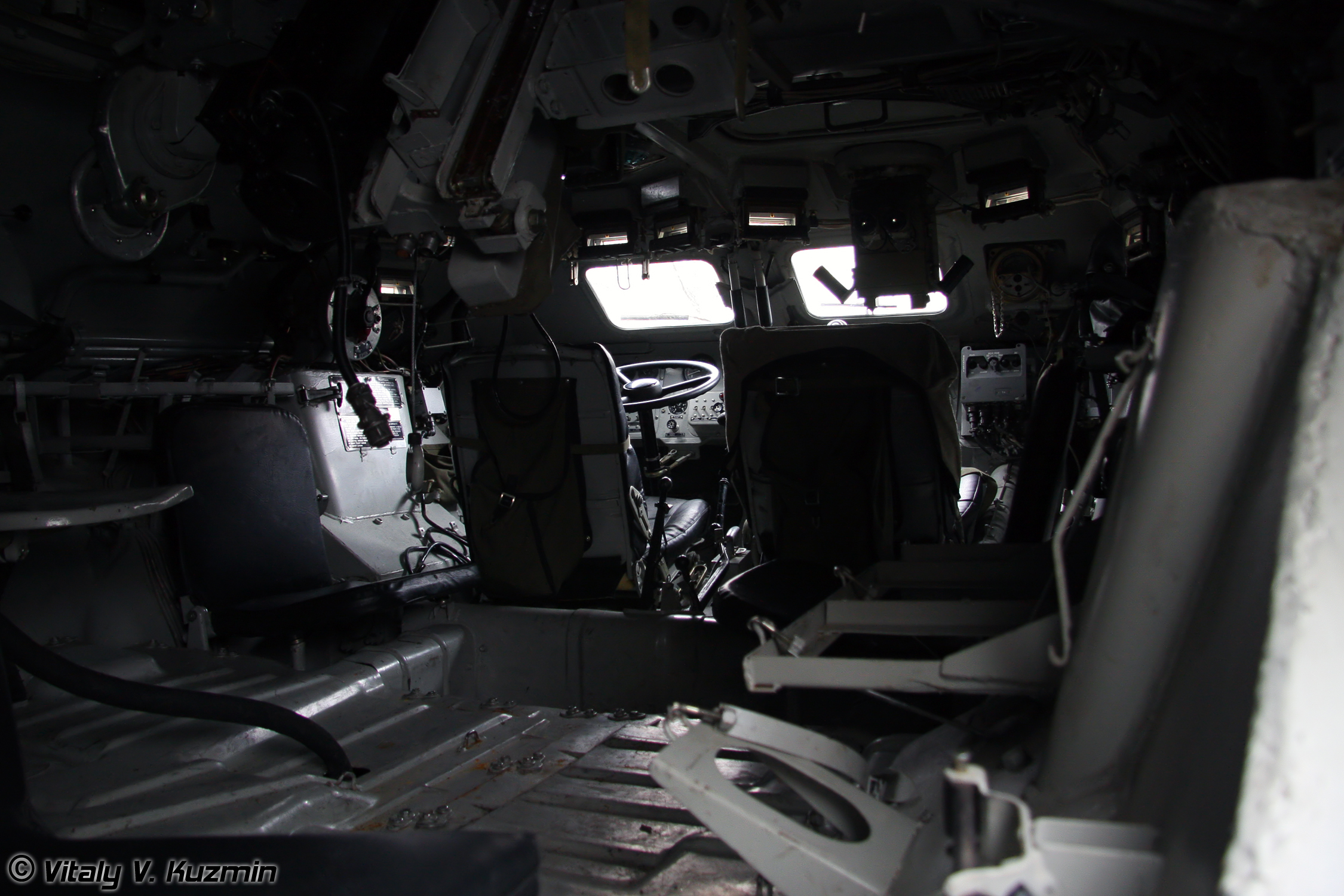

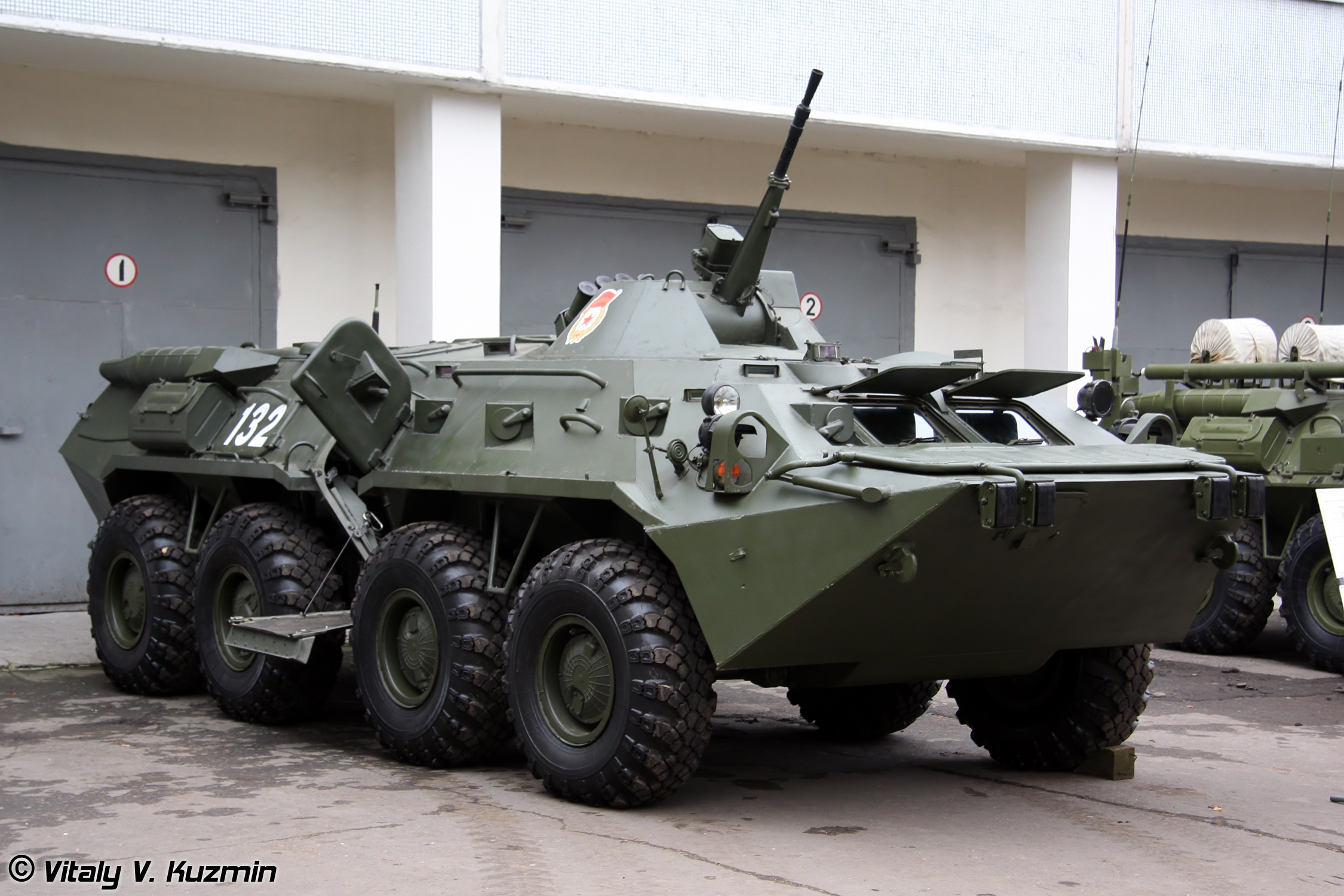

              KAMAZ-43501

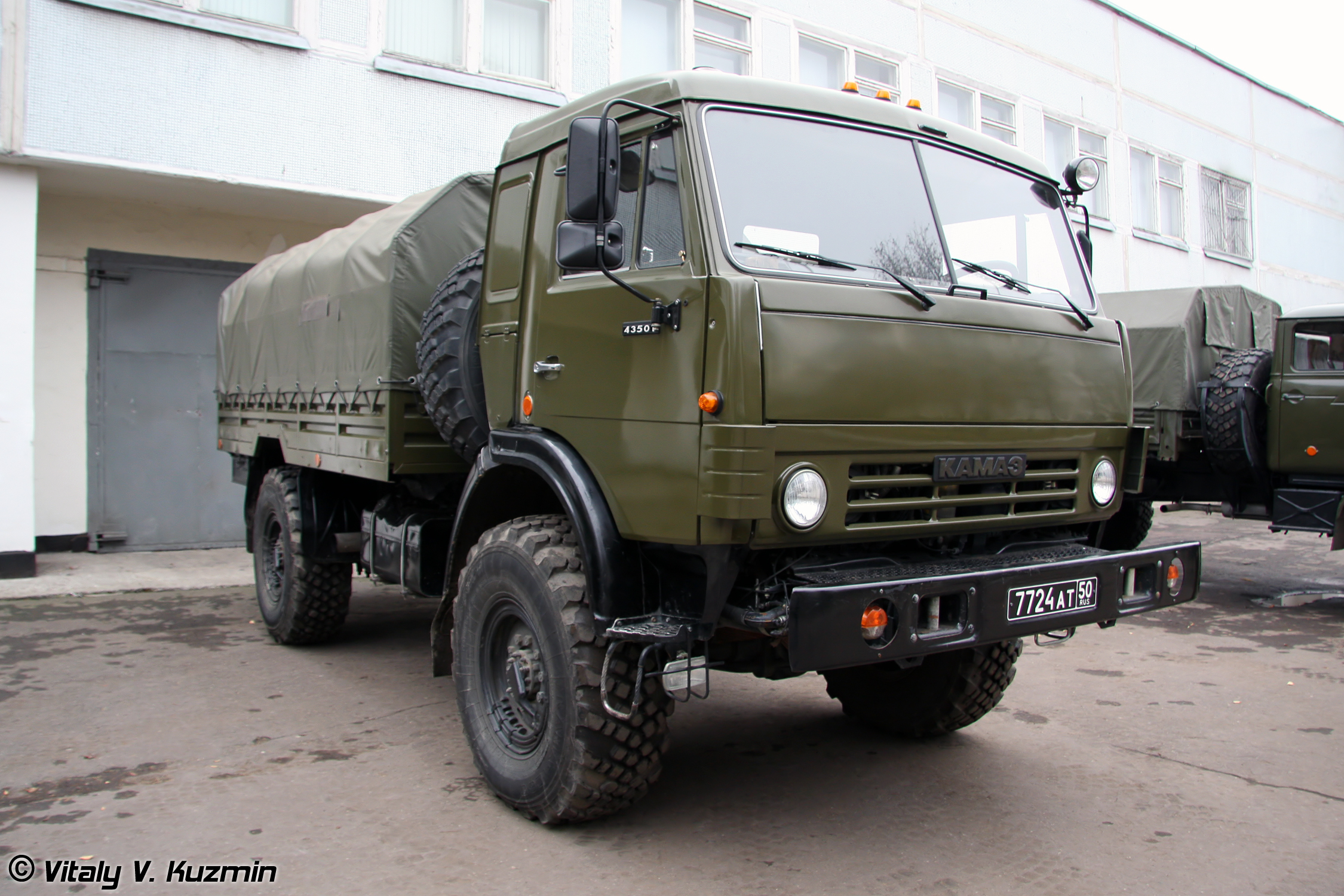

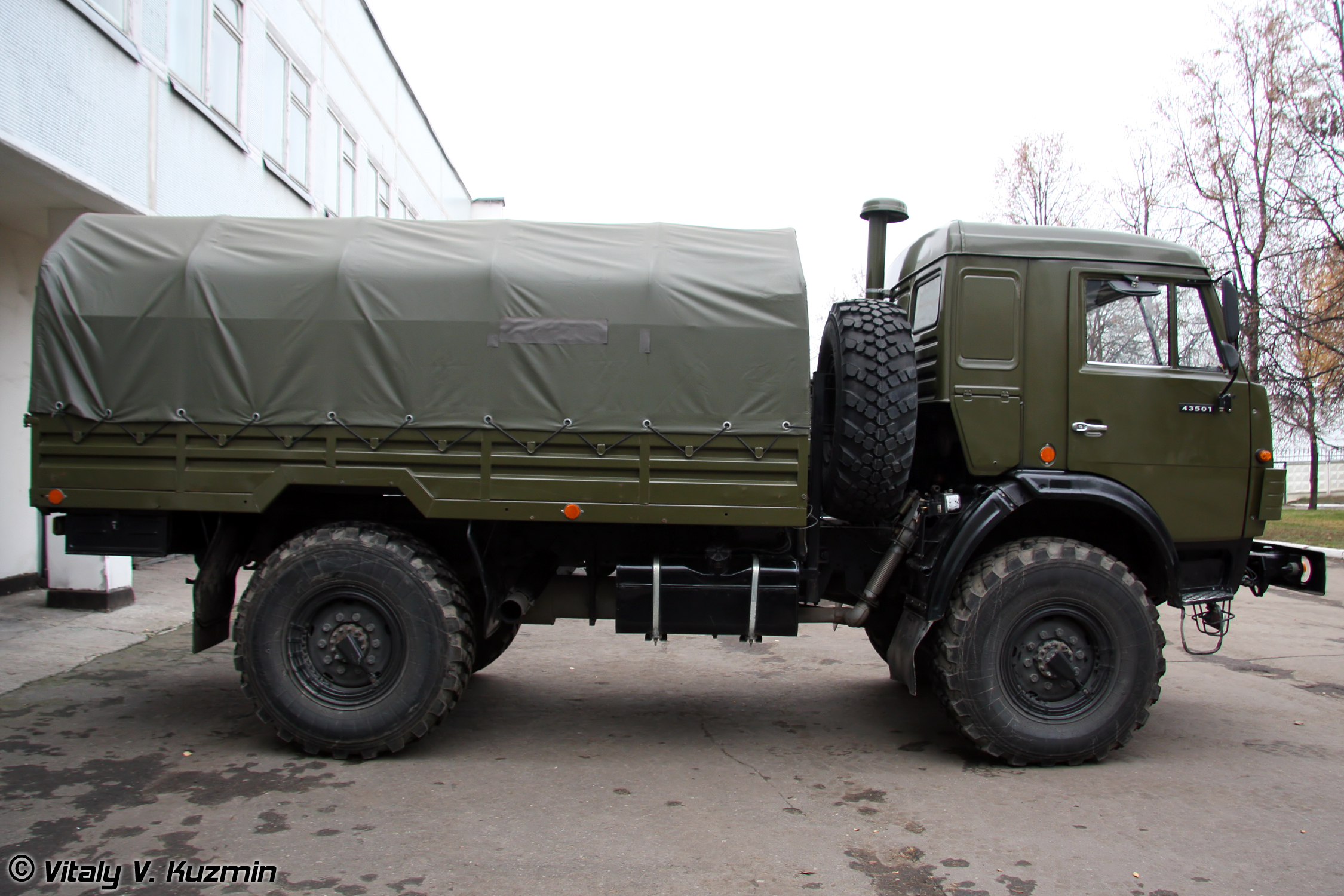

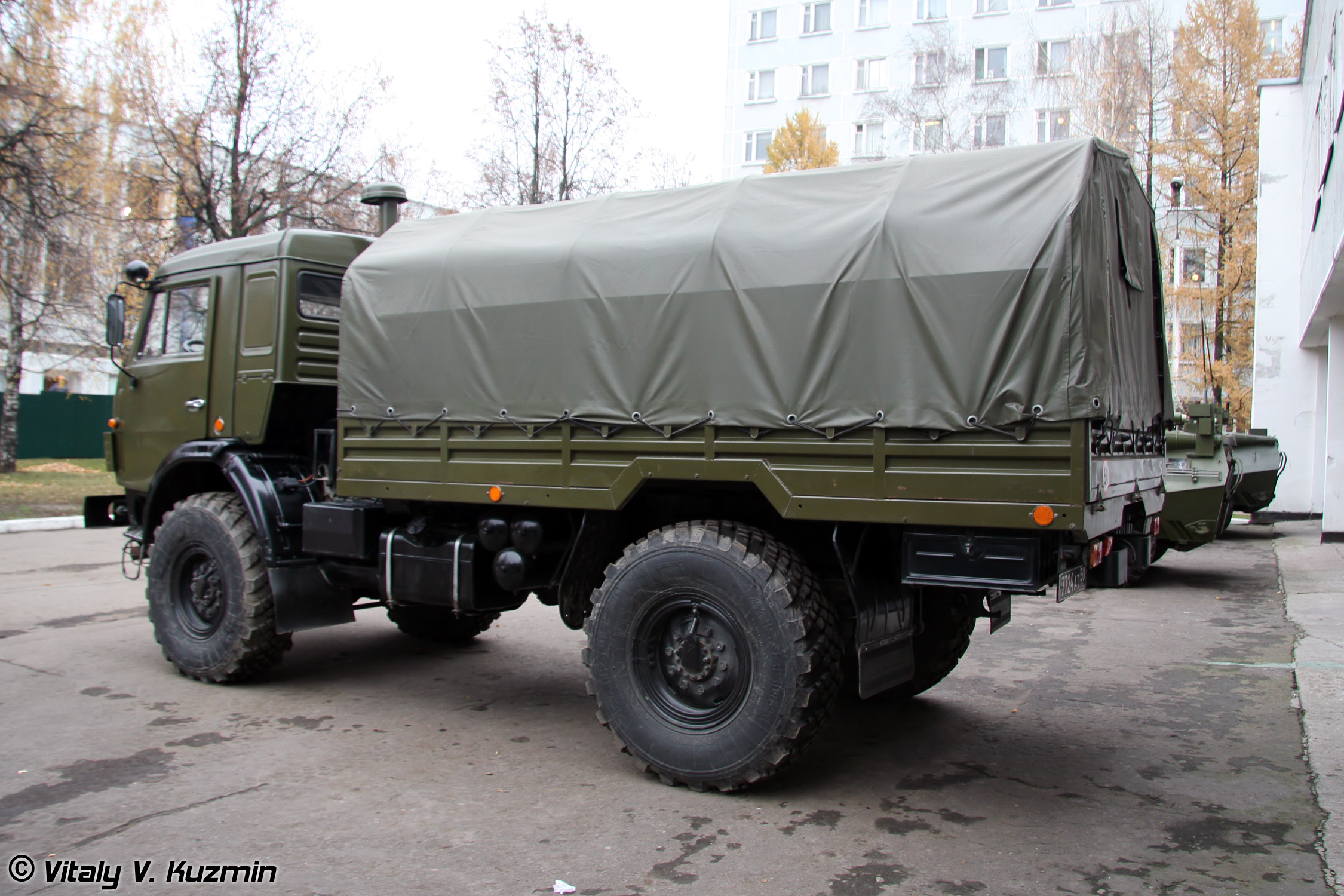

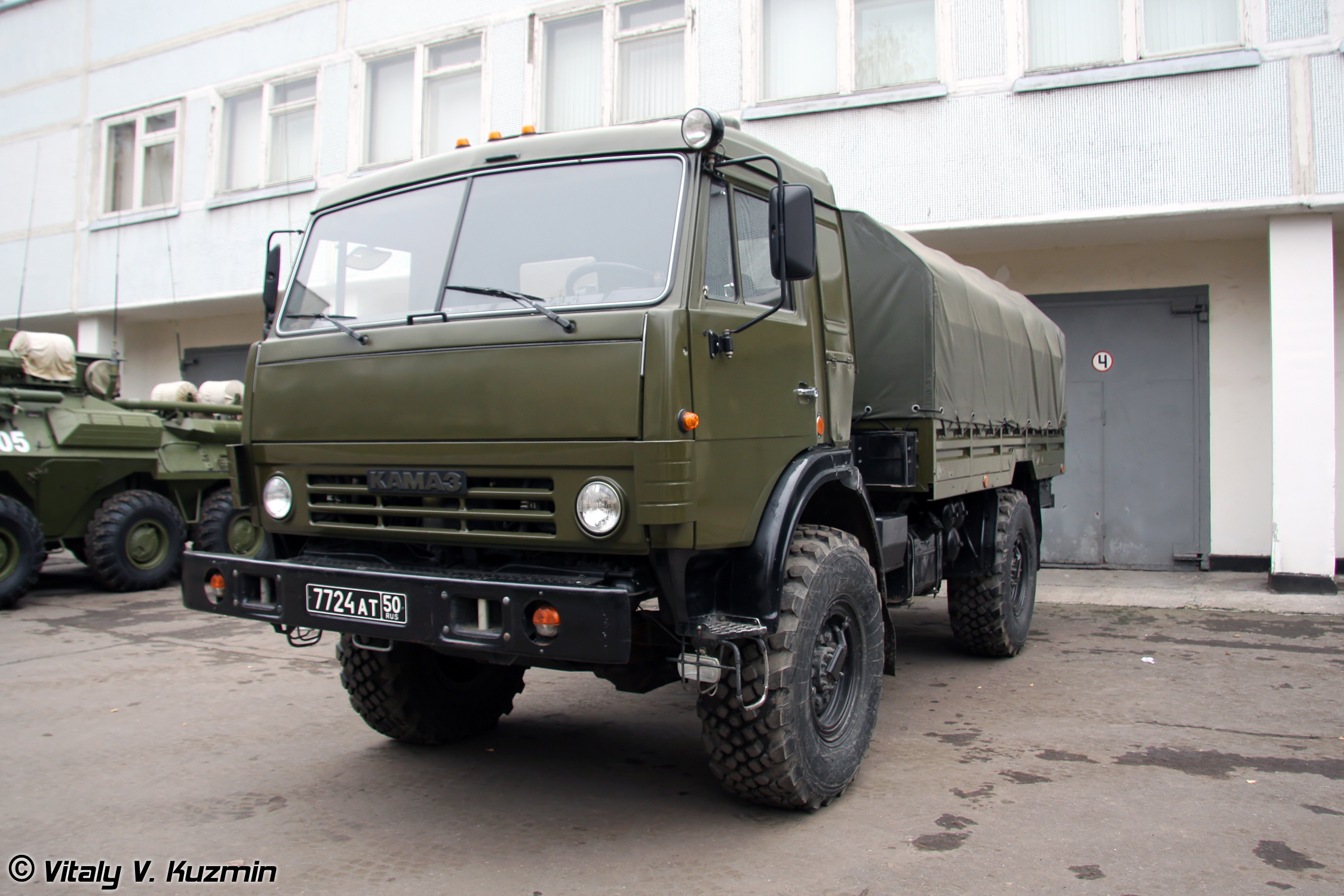

               Ural-43206

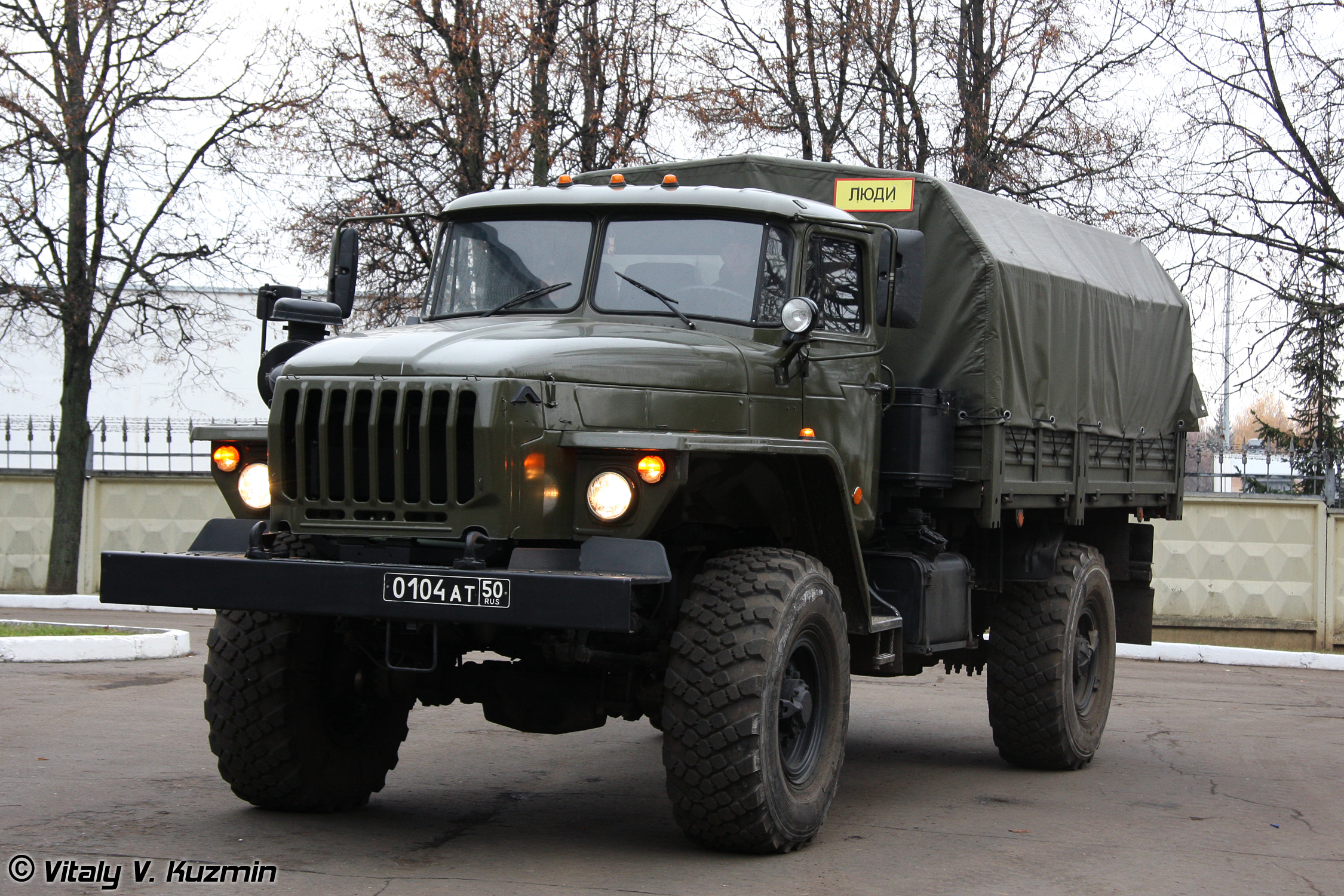

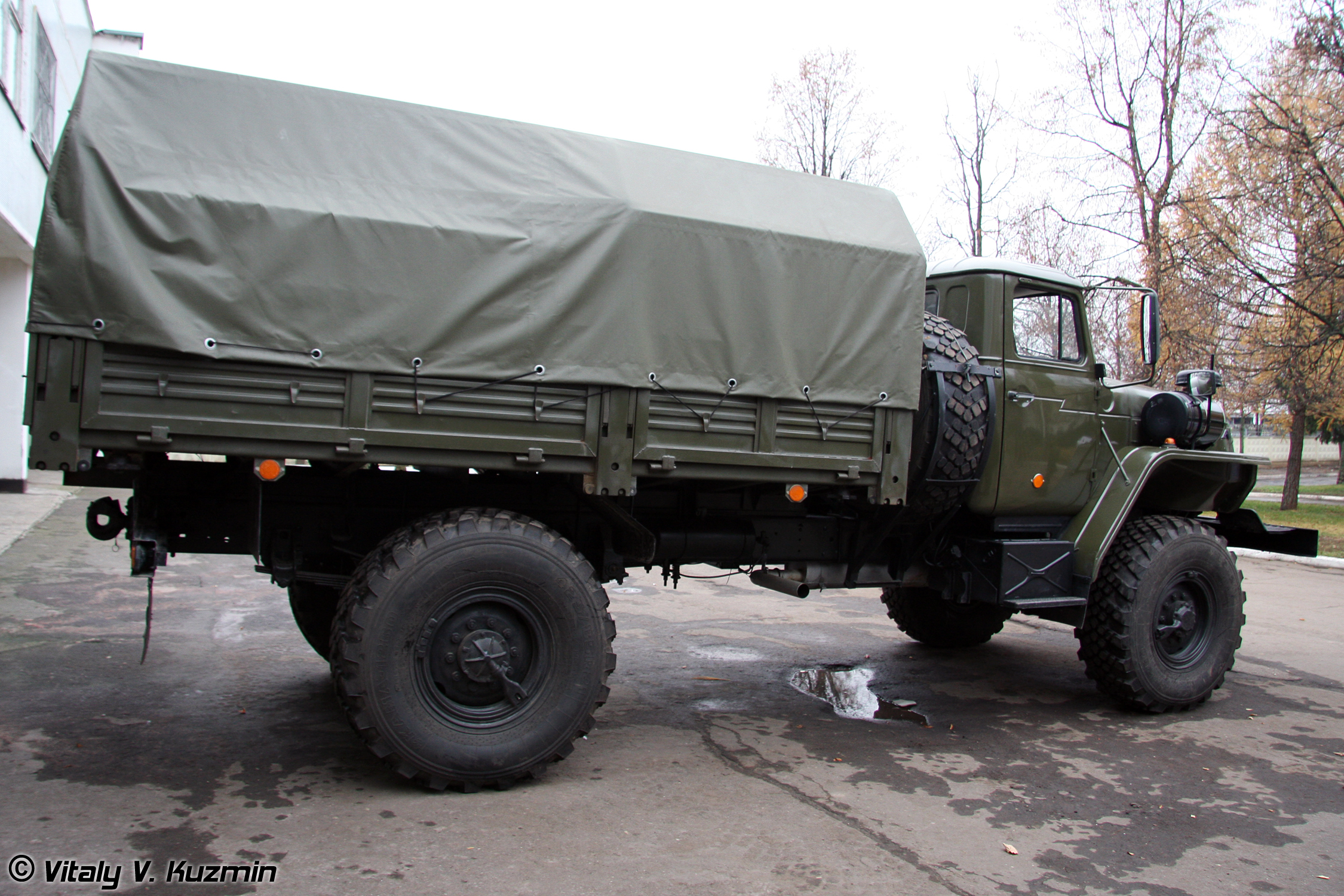

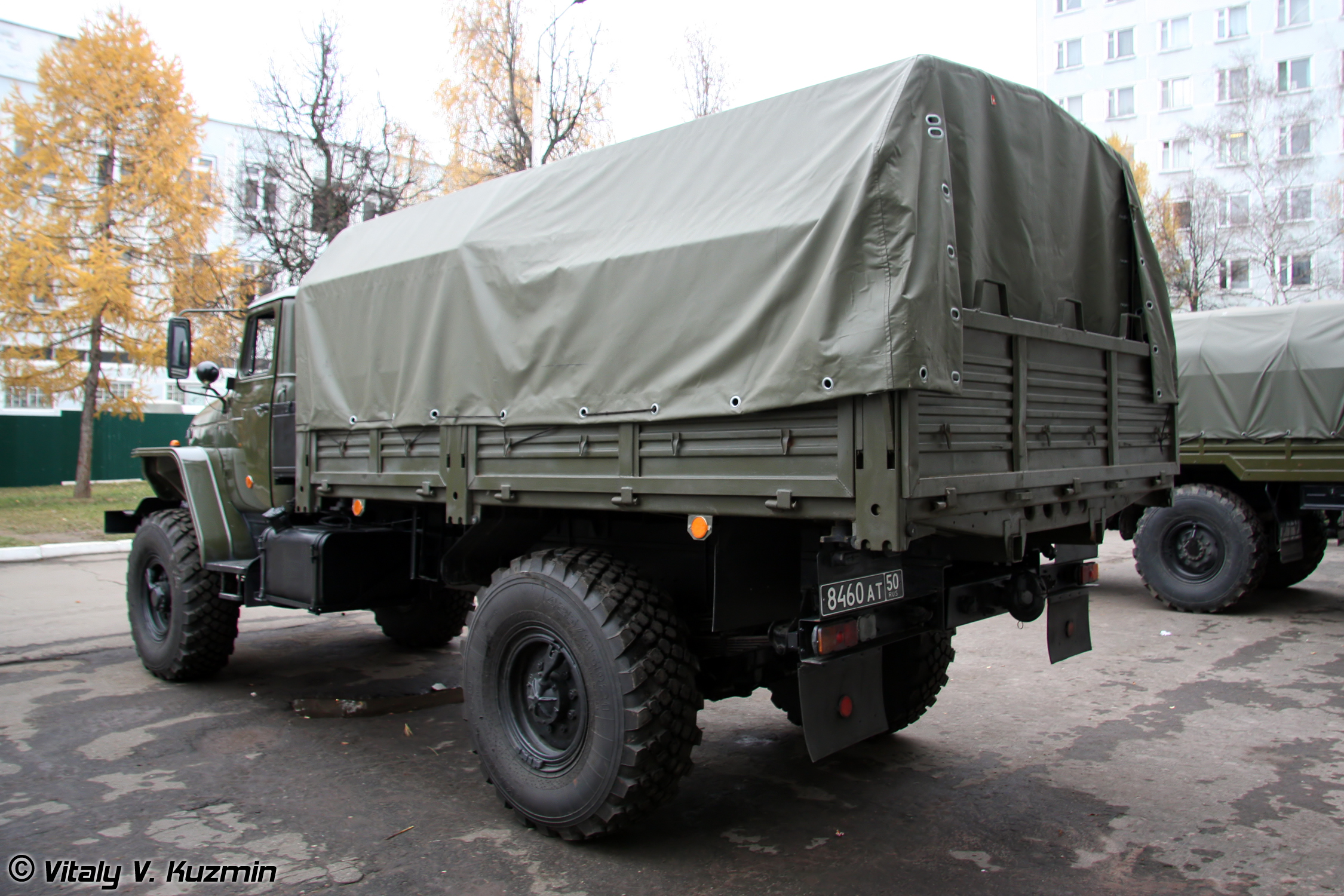

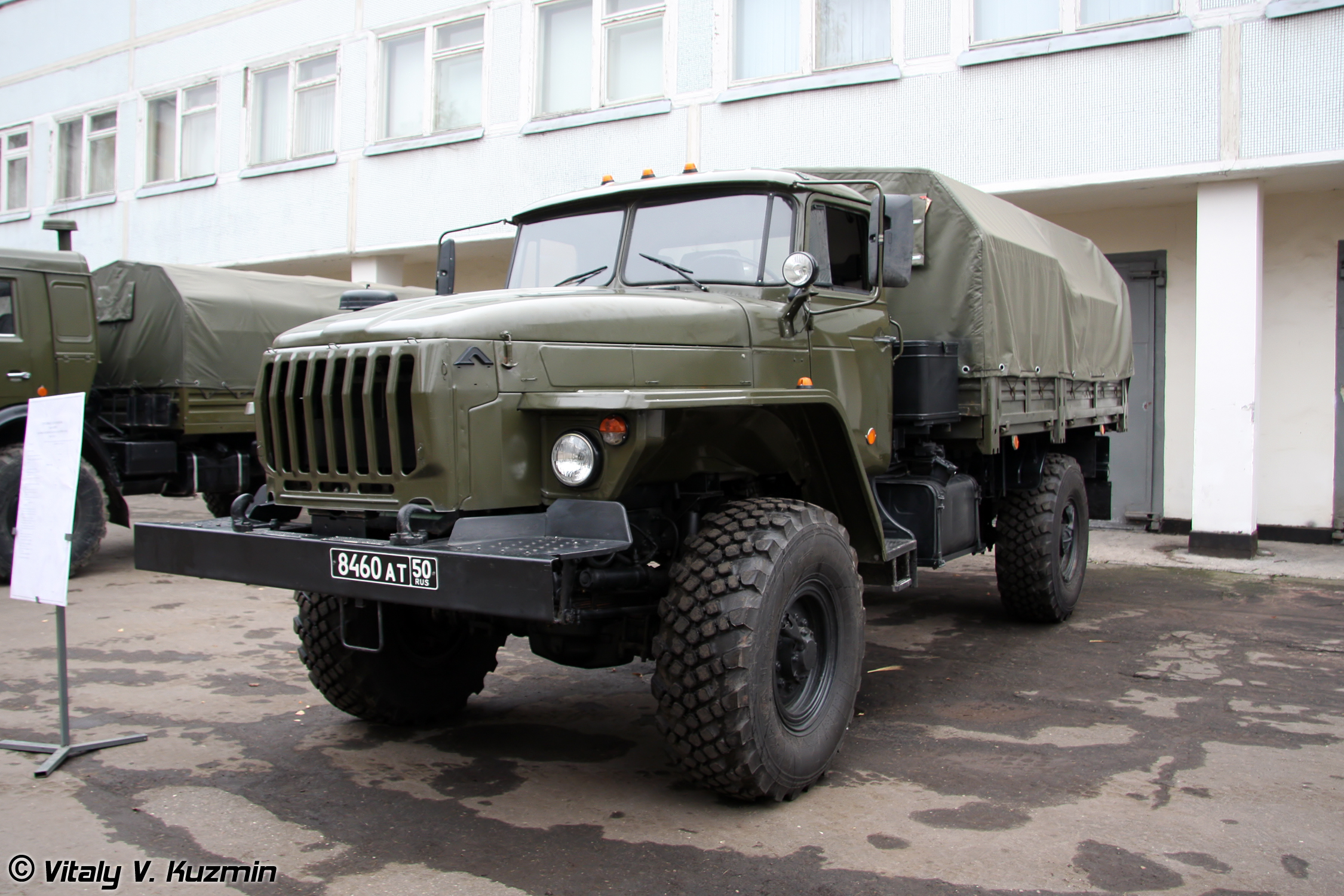

       120-mm 2S12 Sani mortar

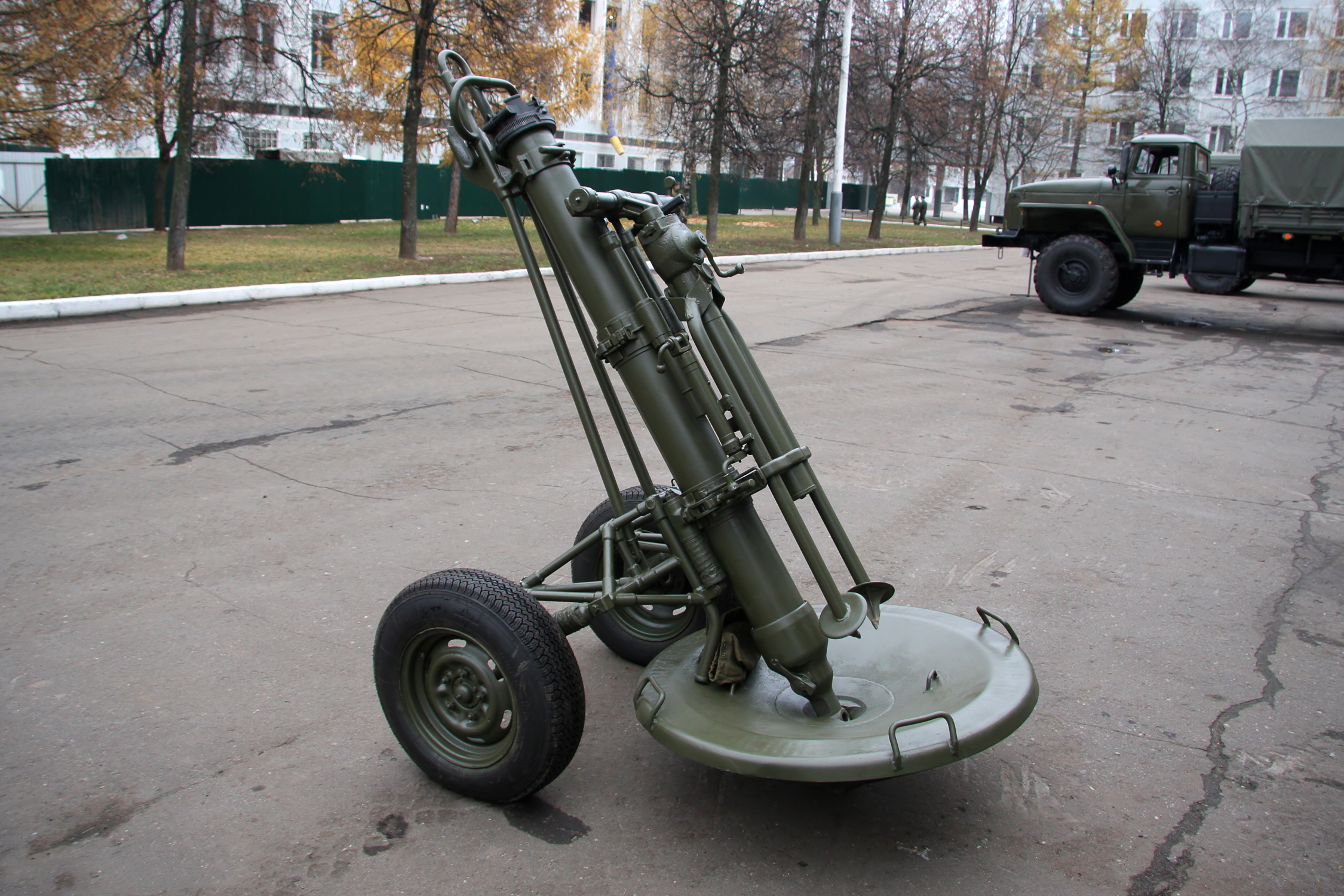

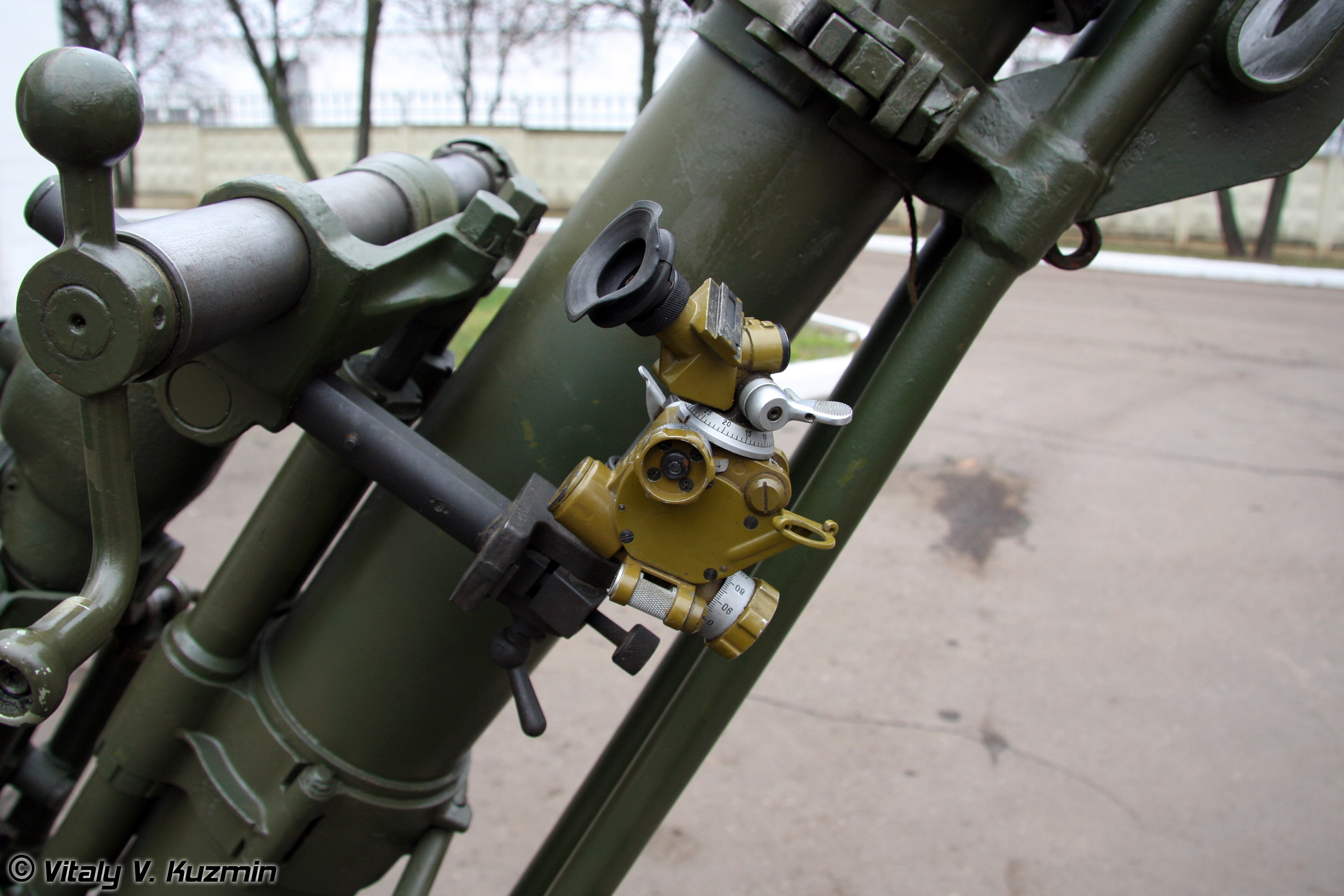

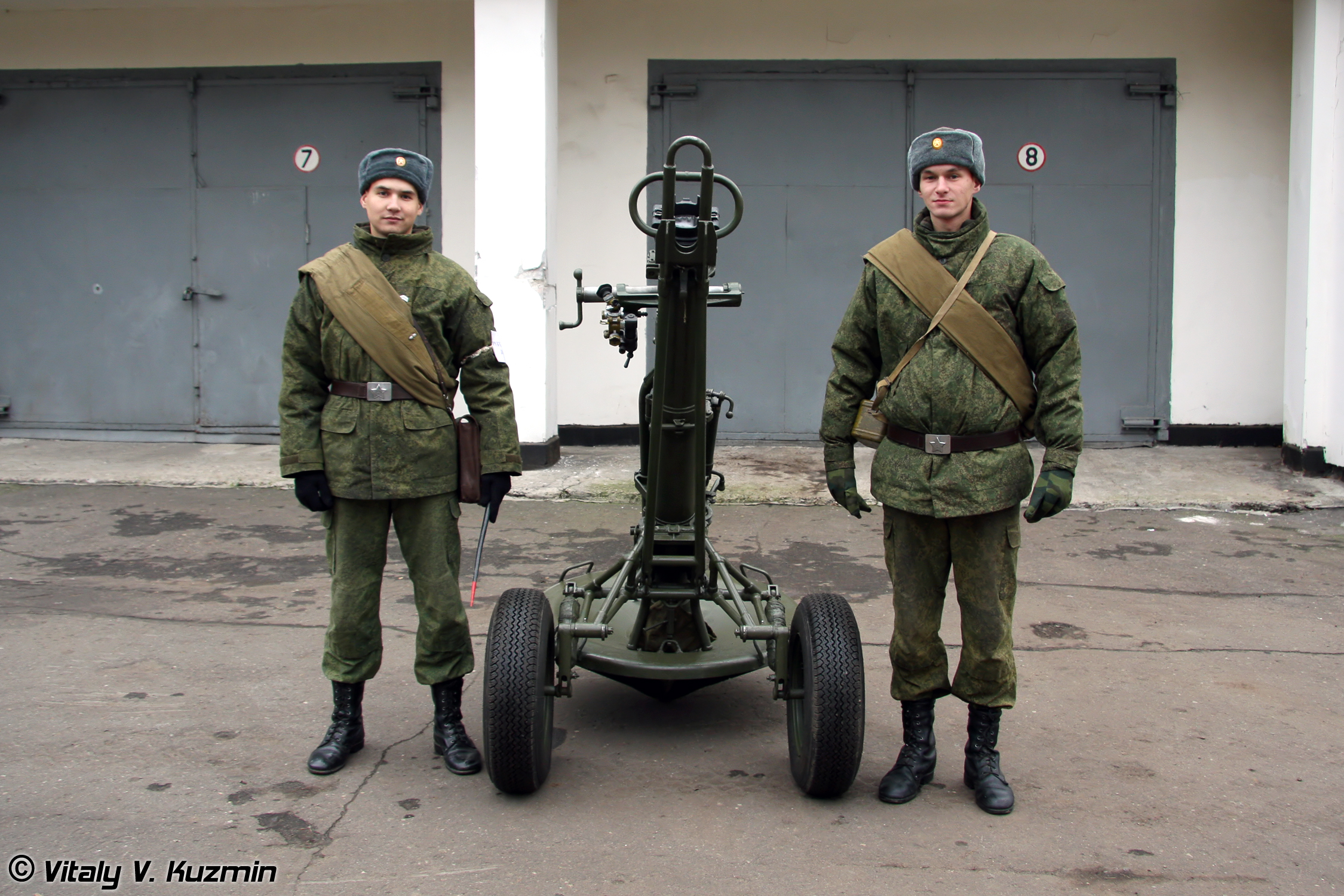

               Conscripts 

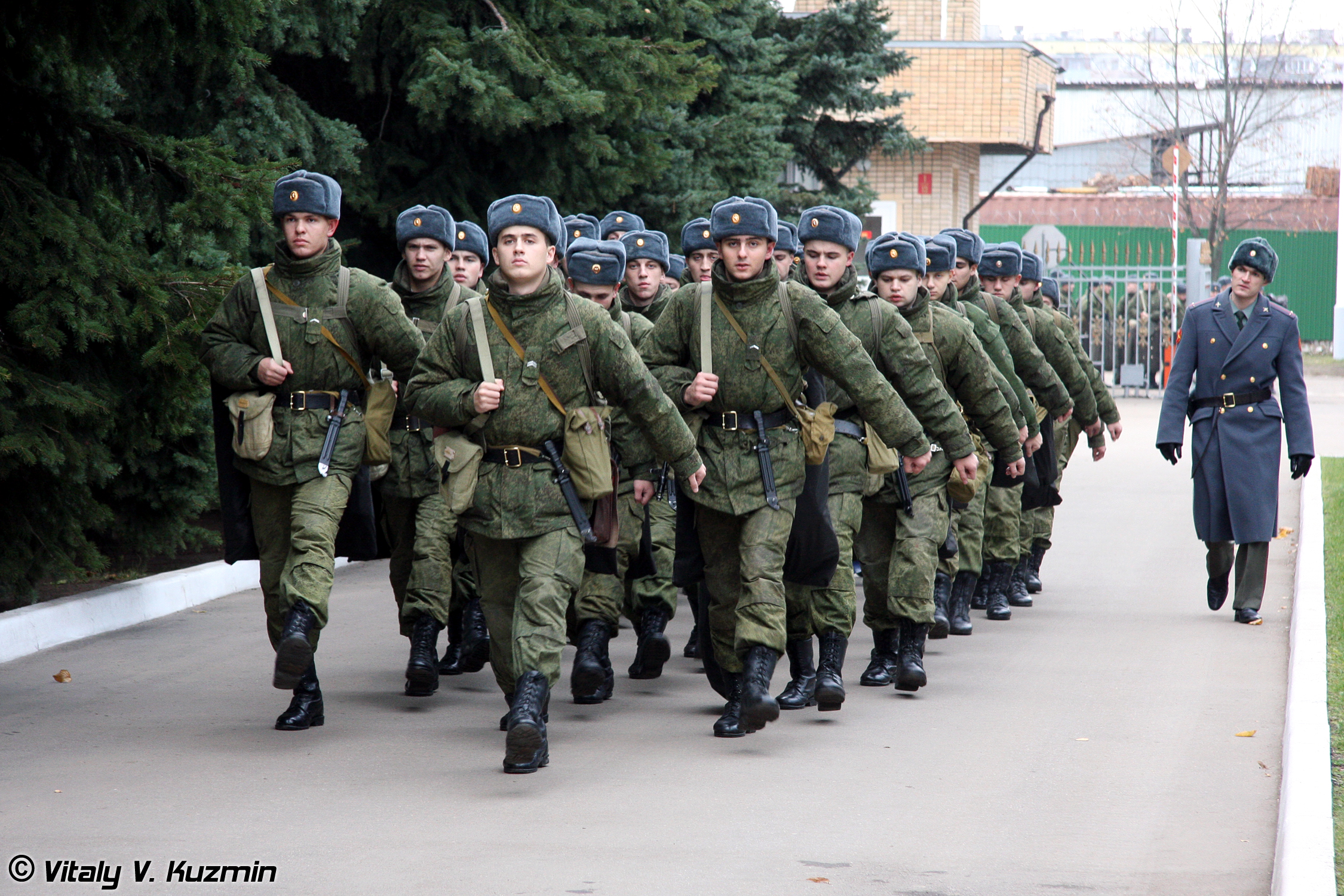
