= Western Grouping of Forces =

The Western Grouping of Forces is a wartime formation of the Russian Ground Forces, found from and supported by the Western Military District (ZVO). It is deployed in Russian-occupied Ukraine and is fighting the Russo-Ukrainian War.

"During the initial stages of the invasion for groups of forces were formed —"West," "East," "Center," and "South"—corresponding to the four military districts. After the Ground Forces retreated from northern Ukraine in the spring of 2022, a relatively stable front line emerged; by late autumn 2022, it had assumed a shape that generally remains.. Within this front line, the groups of forces were clearly assigned axes in which they, using their own forces and assets, carried out combat missions. The northernmost section of the front from the state border to the Svatovo region, referred to by the Russian Ministry of Defense as the "Kupyansk direction," falls within the responsibility of the Group of Forces "West.""

Its current commander is General Lieutenant Yevgeny Nikiforov.

== Units and formations ==
Staff Western Grouping of Forces

- 1st Guards Tank Army, WMD (Lieutenant General Sergey Aleksandrovich Kisel [dismissed]; unnamed deputy commander [dismissed])
  - 60th Command Brigade
  - 2nd Guards Motor Rifle Division (Deputy Commander Lieutenant Colonel Andriy Smirnov – seriously wounded)
    - 1st Guards Tank Regiment (Lieutenant Colonel Denis Lapin)
    - 1st Guards Motor Rifle Regiment
      - 15th Guards Motor Rifle Regiment (Colonel Kharitonov – seriously wounded)
      - 147th Guards Self-Propelled Artillery Regiment
      - 1432nd Motorized Rifle Regiment
    - 4th Guards Tank Division (Colonel Yevgeny Nikolayevich Zhuravlyov)
      - 12th Guards Tank Regiment (S. I. Safonov)
      - 13th Guards Tank Regiment
      - 423rd Guards Yampolsky Motor Rifle Regiment
    - 49th Anti-Aircraft Rocket Brigade (Colonel Ivan Grishin †)
    - 47th Tank Division
      - 26th Tank Regiment
      - 153rd Tank Regiment
      - 245th Guards Motor Rifle Regiment
      - 272nd Motor Rifle Regiment
    - 6th Engineer Regiment (Colonel Mikhail Aleksandrovich Nagamov † [Nagamov was promoted to Deputy Chief of the Engineering Troops of the Western Military District 5 days before he was killed])
    - 27th Guards Motor Rifle Brigade (Colonel Sergey Safonov)
    - 69th Logistics Brigade
    - 96th Reconnaissance Brigade
    - 112th Guards Missile Brigade
    - 202nd Anti-Aircraft Missile Brigade
    - 288th Artillery Brigade (Lieutenant Colonel Oleg Evseev †)
  - 6th Combined Arms Army, WMD (Lieutenant General Vladislav Nikolayevich Yershov [dismissed & arrested])
    - 95th Command Brigade
    - 25th Guards Motor Rifle Brigade
    - 138th Guards Motor Rifle Brigade (Colonel Sergei Maksimov)
    - 9th Guards Artillery Brigade
    - 5th Anti-Aircraft Brigade
    - 26th Missile Brigade
    - 132nd Signals Brigade
    - 1486th Motor Rifle Regiment
  - 20th Guards Combined Arms Army, WMD (Lieutenant General Andrey Sergeevich Ivanaev)
    - 9th Guards Command Brigade
    - 3rd Motor Rifle Division (Major General Aleksei Vyacheslavovich Avdeyev)
      - 237th Tank Regiment
      - 252nd Guards Motor Rifle Regiment (Colonel Igor Nikolaev †)
      - 362nd Motor Rifle Regiment
      - 752nd Guards Motor Rifle Regiment
      - 99th Self-Propelled Artillery Regiment
    - 144th Guards Motor Rifle Division (Lieutenant General Oleg Tsokov from August 2022, (wounded September 2022) †, previously Major General Vitaly Sleptsov)
      - 59th Guards Tank Regiment (Colonel Alexander Bespalov †)
      - 254th Guards Motor Rifle Regiment (Colonel I.A. Danshin)
      - 283rd Motor Rifle Regiment
      - 488th Guards Motorised Rifle Regiment
      - 856th Guards Self-Propelled Artillery Regiment
    - 53rd Anti-Aircraft Missile Brigade
    - 236th Guards Artillery Brigade
    - 448th Rocket Brigade (Colonel Dmitri Nikolaevich Martynov)
    - 232nd Rocket Artillery Brigade
  - 3rd Army Corps
    - 6th Motor Rifle Division
      - 54th Motor Rifle Regiment
      - 57th Motor Rifle Regiment
      - 10th Tank Regiment
      - 27th Artillery Regiment
      - 52nd Anti-Aircraft Missile Artillery Brigade
    - 17th High-Power Artillery Brigade
    - 72nd Motor Rifle Brigade
      - «Alga» battalion (Colonel Yaga - captured)
      - «Molot» battalion
      - Bashkir "Shaimuratova" volunteer battalion
      - Orenburg Oblast "Yaik' volunteer battalion

== Previous commanders ==
- formerly Colonel General Sergey Kuzovlev (October 2022 to December 2022)
- formerly Colonel General Alexander Lapin (September 2022 to October 2022))
- replaced Lieutenant General Roman Berdnikov (4 September to 19 September 2022))
- (replaced Lieutenant General Andrei Sychevoi (from June 2022; reportedly dismissed by 4 September 2022) "General Andrey Sychevoi stands out, who at one time went through the war in Syria, but during the war in Ukraine he did not cope with the task and was dismissed from the post of commander of the Western Military District. He [was] 53 years old."(June 27 to 26 August))
- (replaced Colonel General Alexander Zhuravlyov in June 2022)
