= 1st Guards Tank Regiment =

1st Guards Tank Chertkov Twice Order of Lenin Red Banner Orders of Suvorov, Kutuzov, and Bogdan Khmelnitsky Regiment named for Marshal of Armed Forces M. E. Katukov
- Russian: 1-й гвардейский танковый Чертковский дважды ордена Ленина, Краснознамённый, орденов Суворова, Кутузова и Богдана Хмельницкого полк имени маршала бронетанковых войск М. Е. Катукова
- Active: 1941—2009; 2016 — present
- Country: Soviet Union (to 1991); Russia (1992–present)
- Branch: Soviet Army; Russian Ground Forces
- Type: Tank regiment
- Part of: 2nd Guards Motor Rifle Division
- Garrison/HQ: Kalininets
- Engagements: Russo-Ukrainian War
- Decorations: Order of Lenin (2); Order of the Red Banner; Order of Suvorov; Order of Kutuzov; Order of Bogdan Khmelnitsky
- Honorifics: Chertkov

Commanders
- Current commander: Lieutenant Colonel Denis Lapin

The 1st Guards Tank Chertkov Twice Order of Lenin, Red Banner, Orders of Suvorov, Kutuzov, and Bogdan Khmelnitsky. Regiment named for Marshal of the Armed Forces M. E. Katukov (1 gv. tp) (Russian: 1-й гвардейский танковый Чертковский дважды ордена Ленина, Краснознамённый, орденов Суворова, Кутузова и Богдана Хмельницкого полк имени маршала бронетанковых войск М. Е. Катукова (1 гв. тп); Military Unit Number 58198) is a highly decorated tank regiment of the Russian Ground Forces and previously the Soviet Army. Part of the 2nd Guards Motor Rifle Division, the regiment is based at Kalininets.

== History ==
The regiment was formed from the highly decorated 1st Guards Tank Brigade on 5 July 1945 in accordance with the 10 June order of the People's Commissariat of Defense directing the reorganization of tank brigades into tank regiments. The 1st Guards Tank Brigade had been formed in 1941 from the 4th Tank Brigade, and had seen intense combat in World War II. Based at Glauchau in Germany, the regiment became part of the 8th Guards Mechanized Division. The division was reorganized as the 20th Guards Motor Rifle Division in 1957. The regiment was transferred to the 9th Tank Division of the 1st Guards Tank Army on 6 June 1958. By a 15 September 1976 decree of the Council of Ministers of the Soviet Union, the regiment was named for the first commander of the 1st Guards Tank Brigade, Mikhail Katukov. In 1991, the regiment was based at Zeithain and fielded 89 T-80, 60 BMP (33 BMP-2, 23 BMP-1, and four BRM-1K), 18 2S1 Gvozdika, six BMP-1KSh, two PRP-3, 4, three RkhM-3, one BREM-2, two PU-12, and three MT-55A.

After the withdrawal of Soviet troops from Germany, the 1st Guards Tank Regiment (then with Military Unit Number 32501) was disbanded with the 9th Tank Division. In January 1992, the 1st Guards Tank Regiment was reformed from the disbanded 290th Tank Regiment of the 2nd Guards Motor Rifle Division, perpetuating the original unit. The banner and historical form of the old 1st Guards Tank Regiment were transferred to the new regiment.

In 2007, the regiment was based at Kalininets and fielded 93 T-80, 15 BMP-2, five BRM-1K, one BTR-80, one BTR-70, 24 2S3 Akatsiya, two PRP-3, one PRP-4, two RkhM, one RkhM-4, one MT-55A, and one MTU-20. During the 2009 Russian military reform, the regiment was relocated without its tanks to Borzoy in Chechnya and reorganized as the 8th Separate Guards Motor Rifle Brigade (Mountain). The new brigade perpetuated the lineage of the 1st Guards Tank Regiment, and the brigade emblem featured an alpenstock representing mountain troops together with the cuirass of the tank troops.

In 2016, the 8th Separate Guards Motor Rifle Brigade (Mountain) was among the brigades used to reform the 42nd Guards Motor Rifle Division, and the 1st Guards Tank Regiment was reformed by 21 December of that year as part of the 2nd Guards Motor Rifle Division at Kalininets, continuing the lineage of the original unit. The regiment is currently equipped with mainly modernized T-72B3 tanks and several other IFV and APC.

The regiment fought in the Russian invasion of Ukraine from 24 February 2022, under the command of Lieutenant Colonel Denis Lapin. On 22 March, the Chief Directorate of Intelligence of the Ministry of Defence of Ukraine published a list of 966 servicemen of the regiment. The regiment suffered heavy losses during the invasion. An officer of the 1st Guards Tank Regiment captured by Ukrainian forces claimed that his unit had crossed the Russia–Ukraine border at Myropillia in Sumy Oblast.

According to documents captured by Ukrainian territorial defense fighters in Sumy Oblast in March 2022, there were 560 men in the 1st Guards Tank Regiment when it crossed into Ukraine. An officer in the regiment's 2nd Tank Battalion's 5th Tank Company's 1st Tank Platoon was accused by Ukrainian prosecutors of giving an order to shell the hospital in Trostianets, Sumy Oblast on 18 March.

In November 2024, it was reported that the 1st Guards Tank Regiment was operating near the village of Kruhliakivka in the Kharkiv Oblast.
