= 2nd Guards Motor Rifle Division =

Russian Ground Forces formation

2nd Guards M. I. Kalinin Taman Motor Rifle Division
- 2-я гвардейская мотострелковая Таманская ордена Октябрьской Революции Краснознаменная ордена Суворова дивизия имени М. И. Калинина
- 2nd Guards Motor Rifle Division Emblem
- Active: 1941–2009; 2013–present
- Country: Soviet Union (until 1991); Russia
- Branch: Red Army (1941–1946); Soviet Army (1946–1991); Russian Ground Forces (1991–present)
- Type: Division
- Role: Mechanized infantry
- Size: 12,000–14,000 soldiers
- Part of: Moscow Military District; 1st Guards Tank Army
- Garrison/HQ: Kalininets, Moscow Oblast
- Nicknames: Tamanskaya Division; Taman Division; Taman Guards
- Patron: Mikhail Kalinin
- Mottos: "Rodina, chest, slava" (Motherland, Honour, Glory)
- Equipment: T-72B3, T-90, BMP-2, BMP-3, BTR-80, Msta-S, Grad MLRS, Tunguska, Tor, Osa, T-14 Armata
- Engagements: World War II; 1991 Soviet coup d'état attempt 1993 Russian constitutional crisis Second Chechen War; Syrian Civil War; Russo-Ukrainian War
- Decorations: Order of the October Revolution; Order of the Red Banner; Order of Suvorov, 2nd class
- Battle honours: Taman

Commanders
- Current commander: Colonel (Guards) Sergey Viktorovich Medvedev

The 2nd Guards M. I. Kalinin Taman Motor Rifle Division (Note: (Russian: 2-я гвардейская мотострелковая Таманская ордена Октябрьской Революции Краснознаменная ордена Суворова дивизия имени М. И. Калинина, romanized: 2-ya gvardeyskaya motostrelkovaya Tamanskaya ordena Oktyabr'skoy Revolyutsii Krasnoznamennaya ordena Suvorova diviziya imeni M. I. Kalinina), commonly known as the Tamanians or Taman Division) is a Guards mechanised infantry division of the Russian Ground Forces. Its Military Unit Number is 23626.

The 2nd Guards Motor Rifle Division was formed in 1941, seeing extensive combat during World War II for which it became one of the most famous and decorated formations in the Soviet military. It was named in honor of Mikhail Kalinin and the town of Taman, remaining intact until it was disbanded in 2009, before being reformed in 2013. Since 2016, it is part of the 1st Guards Tank Army of the Western Military District, and most of its units are based in the town of Kalininets, Moscow Oblast, 45 kilometers (28 mi) south-west of Moscow.

During the Russian invasion of Ukraine, units of the division invaded Ukraine's Sumy Oblast, and engaged in combat near the city of Trostianets.

== History ==
The 127th Rifle Division was formed 8 June 1940 in Kharkiv, on the base of the 23rd Rifle Division which was just transferred to participate in the imminent Soviet occupation of the Baltic states (1940).

The division was initially garrisoning Kharkiv, Chuhuiv and Bohodukhiv. It was transferred to Rzhyshchiv in May 1941. The 127th Rifle Division was with 19th Army's 25th Rifle Corps, along with 134th and 162nd Rifle Divisions on June 22, 1941. It formed part of the High Command reserve. By August, it was with the Front troops of the Soviet Reserve Front. After the other division of the 25th Rifle Corps (134th and 162nd) were shattered on arrival to south-east outskirts of Vitebsk during 11–16 July 1941, the 127th was re-routed to south-east of Smolensk and reassigned to the 34th Rifle Corps. At that time, the 535th Rifle Regiment has lost its way and ended up being incorporated into the Leningrad Front. On 4 August 1941, the 127th Division traversed the Dnieper River 13 km south of Yartsevo as part of the general Soviet retreat. Afterwards, it was relieved of front line duty and sent to Dorogobuzh for replenishment, where it received the 875th Rifle Regiment from the 158th Rifle Division.

=== As the 2nd Guards Rifle Division ===
For distinguished combat service, the division was renamed as the 2nd Guards Rifle Division on 18 September 1941, attaining "Guards" status. At the end of September 1941, it fought in Hlukhiv area, retreating toward Kleven river as part of General Arkady Yermakov's operational group of the Bryansk Front. Transferred to the Kursk area on 3 October 1941, it fought a defensive battle around the town of Tim.

On 22 December 1941, the division started to advance during the Winter Campaign of 1941–42. Acting together with the 1st Guards Rifle Division and 87th Rifle Division, it advanced through Cheremisinovo and Sovetsky districts of the Kursk Oblast. By 28 January 1942, the division was located in Stary Oskol.

=== As the 2nd Guards Tamanskaya Rifle Division ===
After participating in the Novorossiysk-Taman offensive in September–October 1943, the division was renamed to 2nd Guards Tamanskaya Rifle Division after the city of Taman, Russia. Starting from 3 November 1943, the division acted in the spearhead of Kerch-Eltigen Operation in northern Yenikale (Ganikale) beachhead, under the command of the 56th Army.

During the Crimean Offensive the division captured the city of Alushta on 15 April 1944, acting under the command of the Separate Coastal Army. 19 May 1944 it was relieved from the front line duty, reassigned to the Soviet Strategic Reserve, 2nd Guards Army and transferred to Dorogobuzh for replenishment. It restarted combat operations 8 July 1944 after the 2nd Guards Army was given to the 1st Baltic Front. The division participated in Šiauliai Offensive and later in October 1944 – in Battle of Memel. In December 1944, the entire army including the 2nd Guards Motor Rifle Division was transferred to 3rd Belorussian Front and participated in the East Prussian Offensive, ending the war in middle April 1945 on the Baltic Sea coast north of Primorsk.

In September 1945, while it was serving with the 11th Guards Rifle Corps, the division was moved back into the Moscow Military District.

=== Postwar ===
On 2 July 1946, the division received the honorific "named after M. I. Kalinin."

The division was called to Moscow for security duties following the death of Joseph Stalin on 5 March 1953.

In December 1953, the division was renamed to 23rd Guards Tamanskaya Mechanised Division, and it joined the 1st Guards Rifle Corps. In March 1957, the division was renamed to 23rd Guards Tamanskaya Motor Rifle Division. In November 1964, the division was renamed to 2nd Guards Tamanskaya Motor Rifle Division.

On 4 May 1990 the 406th Guards Motor Rifle Regiment reverted to its Second World War number as the 15th Guards Motor Rifle Regiment. The same year the 73rd Guards MRR returned to its Second World War numbering, becoming the 1st Guards Motor Rifle Regiment.

=== From 1991 ===
The division has played a prominent role in two of the major political crises of recent Soviet and Russian history. In 1991, it was one of the divisions deployed in Moscow as part of the hardline coup attempt against the Soviet President Mikhail Gorbachev; however, it was a tank unit attached to the division that switched sides at the decisive point in the coup's course. Boris Yeltsin delivered a speech standing on top of tank no. 110, strengthening his own position significantly, both domestically and abroad.

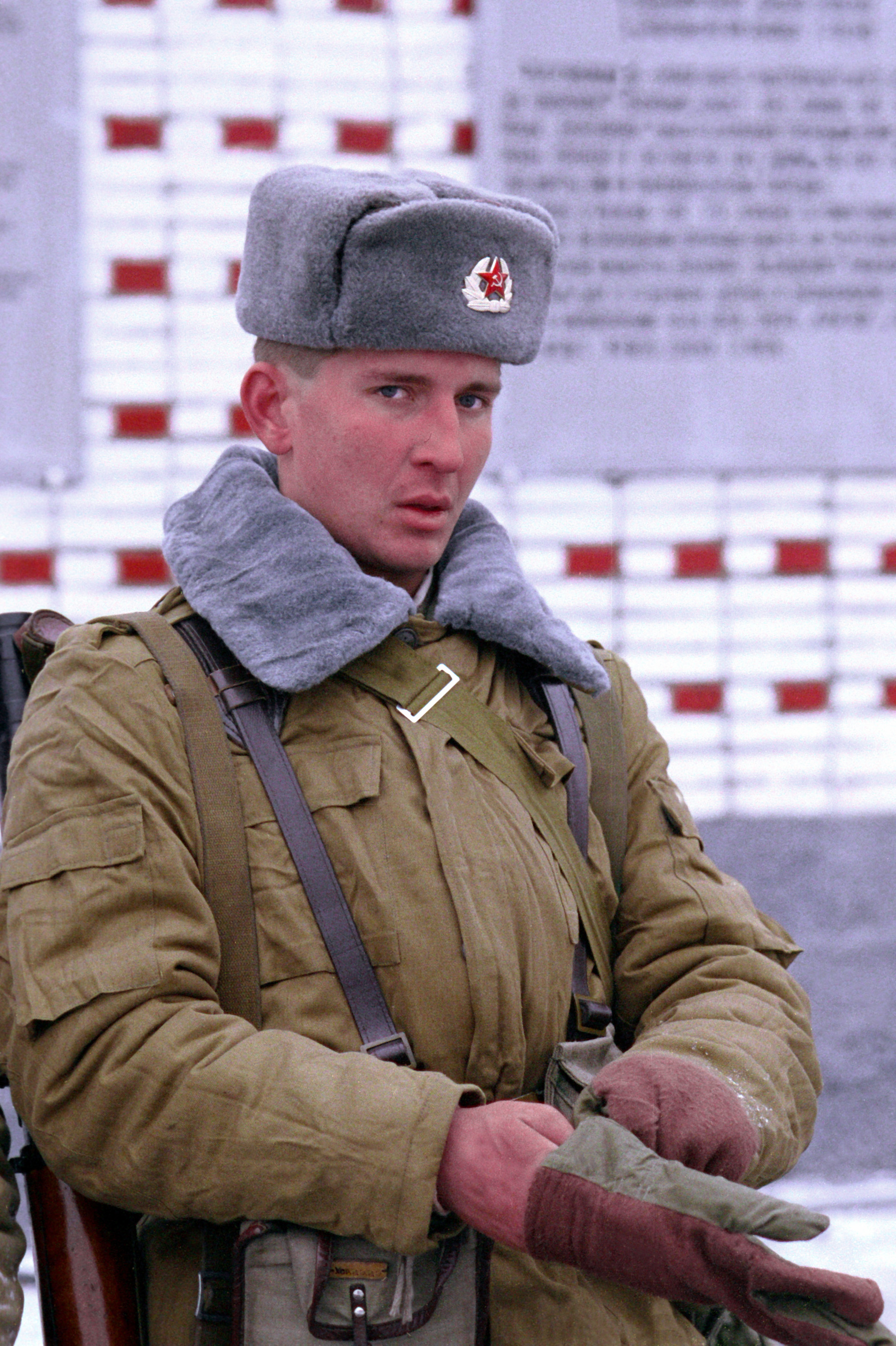
A soldier of the Tamanskaya division, 1992

Two years later, the division once again came to Yeltsin's rescue, during the 1993 Russian constitutional crisis. The stand-off between the Russian Parliament and Yeltsin, against the backdrop of massive public demonstrations in Moscow against Yeltsin's government, had by 2 October brought Russia to the brink of civil war. Between 2 and 4 October, the army considered its position. By sunrise of the 4th, they had given their support to Yeltsin. That day, tanks from the Tamanskaya Division opened fire on the Parliament building, where the Parliament's supporters were barricaded. This episode consolidated Yeltsin's power; it was the deadliest street fighting in Moscow since 1917.

Valery Evnevich commanded the Taman division during the events of October 3-4, 1993 in Moscow. Many media outlets claim that he personally supervised the actions of tank units that conducted targeted fire at the White House building. On October 7, 1993, Boris Yeltsin awarded him the title “Hero of the Russian Federation” for his participation in the storming of the White House.

Around 1998-2000, the division numbered around 12,000 soldiers.

Since then, the division has seen service in Chechnya: it is known to have contributed to the force that brought the republic back under Russian control in 1999 and 2000, during the Second Chechen War. A 'tactical group' from the 15th Guards Motor Rifle Regiment deployed to Chechnya in early 2000, serving in the south of the republic and the Argun Gorge after the end of major combat operations to maintain security. In 2004, it was visited by a delegation of foreign military attaches. The Kalininets base has also recently provided the venue for the Miss Russian Army contest.

The division was located near Aprelevka, in the Moscow suburbs: its various subunits occupied a vast complex of buildings and sites to the north and northwest of the town. The two most important 'sub-bases' in the area are Kalininets and Kobyakovo. It was one of the Russian Army's 'constant readiness' divisions, meaning that it was required to have at least 80% manpower and 100% equipment strength at all times; it was thus intended to be readily deployable.

=== Rearmament in 2007 ===
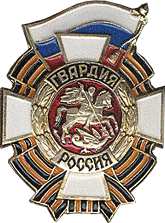
Chest badge for Russian Guards troops.

On 22 January 2007, the Russian news agency Interfax reported comments from the commander of the Moscow Military District, Col. General Vladimir Bakin. He stated that the Tamanskaya Division's 1st Guards Motor Rifle Regiment had been re-equipped with a battalion of T-90 main battle tanks, replacing its old T-80s, a battalion of BTR-80 armoured personnel carriers (this presumably refers to the modernised BTR-80A variant, which has improved firepower and armour, among other things), as well as a battalion of new self-propelled howitzers and 'C2' command and control systems. Bakin also said that the regiment's 3rd Battalion had begun re-equipping with the BMP-3 infantry fighting vehicle, of which the regiment as a whole was due to receive 129 by the end of the year.

Furthermore, according to Interfax: "Bakin stated that the First Guards Regiment had already undergone training for operating new materiel. "The regiment was the first in the Russian army to successfully master new arms and materiel. Last year, the regimental personnel were graded highly on their performance, he said."

This rearmament may represent the first publicly known deployment of the T-90 in the Russian Army outside of the 5th Guards 'Don' Tank Division, based at Kyakhta in the Siberian Military District, which has been entirely equipped with such tanks in recent years. There have been rumours in circulation for some time now that all the T-90s currently in service were to be accumulated in the Tamanskaya Division, but these rumours lack reliable sources. If any such move is to occur, it may take place in 2007, but January's partial rearmament of the division does not seem to signal the beginning of such a move, since the T-90s and other modern armoured vehicles now with the division are newly purchased ones.

The division has been slated for disbandment in 2009, with two brigades being created from its existing subunits. Each brigade will include about 7,500 personnel with one mounted on BMP-3 tracked vehicles while the other using BTR-80 and BTR-90 wheeled vehicles. The two brigades, according to Warfare.ru, were the 5th Separate Guards Motor Rifle Brigade in the Moscow Military District, and the 8th Separate Guards Mountain Motor Rifle Brigade in Chechnya. The 8th Separate Guards Mountain Motor Rifle Brigade was formed from the 1st Guards Tank Regiment of the division, relocated without its tanks to Borzoy in Chechnya from Alabino.

=== As the 5th Guards Tamanskaya Motor Rifle Brigade ===
The division was disbanded in mid-2009, being split into two new motor rifle brigades. After 2009, the main successor of the division was the 5th Guards Separate, Order of the October Revolution, Red Banner, Order of Suvorov Brigade named after Kalinin, which inherited the traditions of the 2nd Guards Motor Rifle Division.

=== 2nd formation (2013) ===
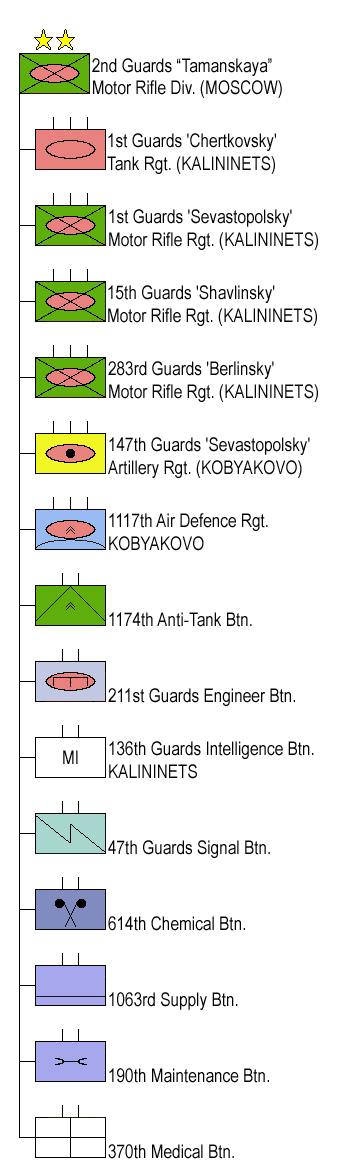
2nd Guards Motor Rifle Division

The division was re-formed in 2013 by order of Russian defence minister Sergei Shoigu, from the 5th Separate Motor Rifle Brigade and other unnamed units. This order is pursuant to Russian President Vladimir Putin's intention to "strengthen the historical continuity" of the Russian Armed Forces by resurrecting the names of "famous, legendary units and formations of the Russian and Soviet armies". Another division, the 4th Guards Kantemirovskaya Tank Division was also reinstated under the same order.

As of June 2015, the Russian Armed Forces planned to rebuild the famous Soviet era 1st Guards Red Banner Tank Army by including the 2nd Guards Motor Rifle Division, 4th Guards Tank Division, as well as one tank and rifle brigade. The decree providing for the reformation of the force was enacted in the winter of 2014, and it became a part of the Western Military District. Unlike the original 1st GTA, the 2nd Guards Motor Rifle Division forms a part of the revived army, based in Moscow Oblast. By December 2016, a new 1st Guards Tank Regiment was formed as part of the division, inheriting the traditions of the old 1st Guards Tank Regiment.

- Division HQ
  - 47th Guards Signal Battalion
  - 136th Guards Reconnaissance Battalion (в/ч 51387)
  - 211th Guards Engineer Sapper Battalion
  - 370th Medical Battalion
  - 1063rd Supply Battalion
  - 1174th Anti-Tank Artillery Battalion (в/ч 51381)
  - UAV company
  - NBC protection company
  - EW company
  - Evacuation company
- 1st Guards Tank Regiment (в/ч 58198)
- 1st Guards Motor Rifle Regiment (returned to its Second World War numbering from previous number '73' in 1990) (в/ч 31135)
- 15th Guards Motor Rifle Shavlinsky Regiment (в/ч 31134)
- 147th Guards Self-Propelled Artillery Regiment (в/ч 73966)
- 1117th Anti-Aircraft Rocket Regiment (в/ч 51382)

Military Unit Numbers for several of the division's regiments are known. Military Unit Numbers 23626, 21626, 31135, 61896, 51387, 61896, 73881 are all regiments of the division. Although some ethnic Russians are in the unit, the unit has many persons from the Caucasus. Selyatino has the hospital for the units at Kalininets. The Taman Division deployed in May 2018.

==== Invasion of Ukraine ====
The division formed part of 1st Guards Tank Army when it took part in the northern front of the Russian invasion of Ukraine.Two of its servicemen were accused of firing a tank into a hospital in Trostianets. On 3 March, according to ukrainian sources, 22 tankers from the division, including the deputy commander of armaments of the 1st Tank Regiment and a battalion commander, together with their equipment, surrendered en masse to the Ukrainians. One of the captured soldiers said the division had entered Ukraine through the Sumy Oblast. Ukrainian prosecutors later accused a member of the division's 1st Guards Motor Rifle Regiment of robbing civilians in the village of Zhyhailivka, Sumy Oblast. Additionally, the commander of the 5th Battery of the division's 147th Artillery Regiment was sentenced in absentia by a Ukrainian court to 10 years imprisonment in 2024 for ordering the killing of a civilian in Boromlia, Sumy Oblast on 9 March 2022. By 11 March 2022, units of the division were reportedly planning to storm the city of Sumy.

After the Russian withdrawal from northern Ukraine, the 2nd Division was deployed to the village of Velyka Komyshuvakha south of Izium, before a Ukrainian counteroffensive retook the area. As of June 2023, the division was positioned near Kreminna. Reportedly having suffered heavy losses, the division retired to Belarus for replenishment, receiving mobilised soldiers and reequipping with older material taken from warehouses. Retraining was required until its redeployment to the Luhansk Oblast in January 2023.

== Subordinated units and fighting strength ==
Its principal vehicles were the T-90 and T-80 main battle tanks, BTR-80 armoured personnel carrier and the BMP-2 and BMP-3 infantry fighting vehicles.

=== 1st Guards Tank 'Chertkovsky' Regiment ===
From January 1992 until 2009, the 1st Guards Tank Chertkovsky Regiment was part of the 2nd Tamanskaya Guards Motor Rifle Division. During the reforms of Defence Minister Anatoly Serdyukov, the 1st Guards Tank Regiment along with the Taman Division was disbanded.

In 2020, the 1st Guards Tank Chertkovsky Regiment (formed late 2016) was planned to be one of the first units to be equipped with the new T-14 Armata main battle tank from Uralvagonzavod. As of February 2022, the unit is equipped with the T-72B3.

The 1st Guards Tank Chertkovsky Regiment is at the point of the spear. Many officers from the Chertkovsky Regiment subsequently take top positions in the Ministry of Defence.

The commander of the 1st Tank Platoon of the 5th Tank Company of the regiment's 2nd Tank Battalion was tried and sentenced in absentia to 11 years imprisonment by a Ukrainian court for the shelling of the city hospital in Trostianets, Sumy Oblast.

In November 2024 it was reported that the 1st Guards Tank Regiment was operating near the village of Kruhliakivka in the Kharkiv Oblast.

== In popular culture ==
In Tom Clancy's 1986 novel Red Storm Rising, the division offers token resistance to a coup d'état by the Soviet Army and the KGB against the Politburo.

In Frederick Forsyth's 1996 novel Icon (novel), the tank division prevents success of a coup d'état by the main antagonist.

This division is featured as a playable division in the 2024 RTS game Warno as part of the Nemesis 4 DLC.
