= 288th Brigade =

288th Brigade may refer to:

- 288th Guards Artillery Brigade, Russia
- 288th Brigade, Royal Field Artillery, United Kingdom
