= Women in the military in Europe =

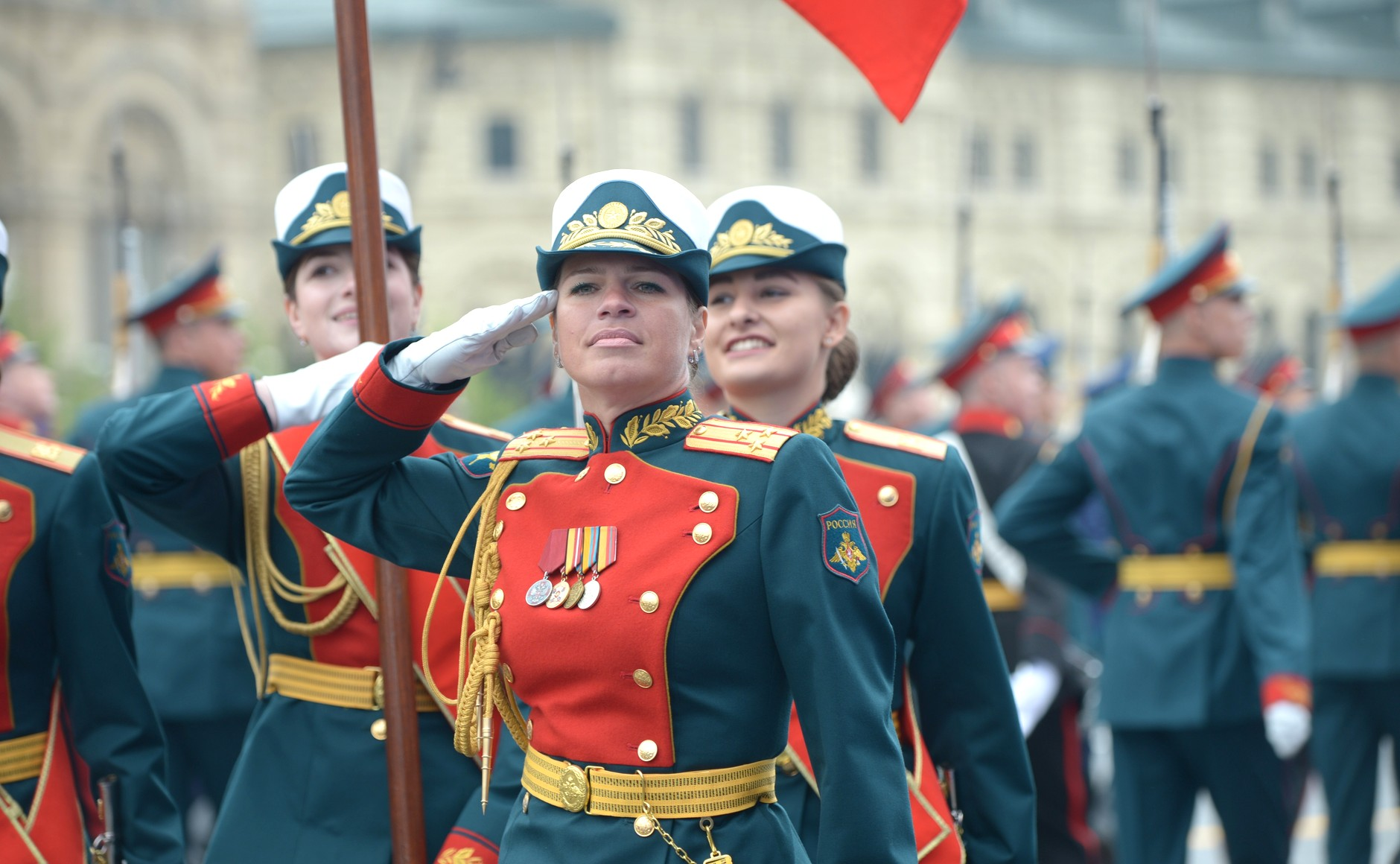
A female honour guard during an exhibition drill portion of the 2019 Moscow Victory Day Parade.

European countries have had varying policies that confine women and military service or the extent of their participation in the national armed services of their respective countries, especially combatant roles in armed conflicts or hostile environments. While most of the countries have always allowed women to participate in military activities involving no direct aggression with the enemy, most began seeing the value of servicewomen in the armed services during the First World War when they began losing unprecedented numbers of servicemen. In the modern era, many of the European countries allow women to voluntarily pursue a career path or profession in the national armed services of their country as well as permit conscription equality, with minimal or no restrictions at all.

In 2015, Norway introduced female conscription, making it the first country in Europe as well as the first NATO member to have a legally compulsory national service for both men and women. In 2017, Sweden followed suit, and Denmark did the same in 2025.

== Armenia ==
In 2013, the Armenak Khanperyants Military Aviation University and the Vazgen Sargsyan Military University were opened to women for the first time. During the 2020 Nagorno-Karabakh war, the spouse of the Armenian Prime Minister founded the Erato Detachment, which is the first all-women military unit in the Armenian Armed Forces.

== Denmark ==
Women were employed in the Danish armed forces as early as 1934 with the Ground Observer Corps, Danish Women's Army Corps and Naval Corps in 1946 and the Women's Air Force since 1953. In 1962 the Danish parliament passed laws allowing women to volunteer in the regular Danish armed forces as long as they did not serve in units experiencing direct combat. 1971 saw the enlistment of women as non-commissioned officers, with military academies allowing women in 1974.

In 1978, based on the reports of studies on the topic, women were allowed to enlist in an all areas of the Danish armed forces, with combat trials in the eighties exploring the capabilities of women in combat. In 1998 laws were passed allowing women to sample military life in the same way as conscripted men, however without being completely open to conscription. Women in the Danish military come under the command of the Chief of Defense.

As of July 2009 the highest rank reached by a woman in the Danish armed forces is Colonel (Susanne Bach Bager, Telegrafregimentet), with 5.2% (832) women in the services: 153 officers, 176 NCOs, and 503 privates (not counting women serving as "concripts"). From the summer 2007 to July 2009 a total of 84 women have served in the Danish Battalion in Helmand province, Afghanistan. This includes frontline service in infantry units and active participation in combat. However recent recruitment of women has been low in Denmark due to rising job opportunities elsewhere. NATO reports also indicate that the Danish military does not promote women to positions of leadership.

As with many nations with women in their armed forces, Denmark has different basic physical requirements for men and women in their armed forces, however the requirements for the more physically demanding jobs do not differ for either sex.

In 2025, Denmark became the third European country to extend conscription to women.

== Finland ==
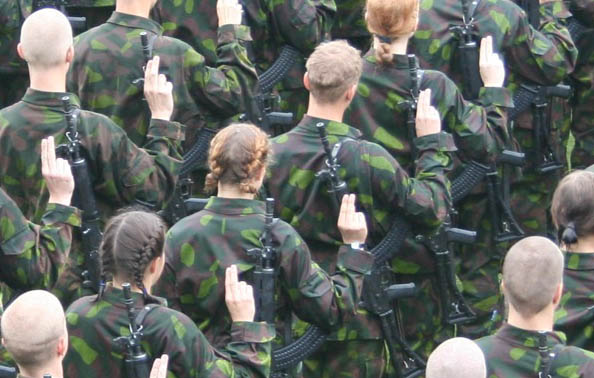
Finnish female soldiers swearing their military oath alongside male conscripts.

The Finnish Defense Forces does not conscript women. However, since 1995, women between 18 and 30 years of age have the possibility of voluntarily undertaking military service in the Defence Forces or in the Border Guard. Females serve under the same conditions as men, with the exception that during the first 45 days of service they have the option to leave the military without consequences. After that, they must complete the service which lasts 6, 9 or 12 months. After the service, the females face the same reserve obligations as the males who have done the obligatory military service. If the female in national service experiences a conscientious crisis which prevents her from fulfilling her military service or reserve obligations, she is ordered to the alternative civilian service, which lasts 12 months.

All services and units in the Finnish Defence Forces and the Finnish Border Guard accept females. In garrison environment, the females are lodged in separate rooms and are given separate toilet and bath facilities. In exercises and aboard ships, women are lodged with men. The women in national service are given an extra allowance of €0,40 per diem for sanitary articles and smallclothes. The females in military service are usually well motivated and some 60% of them receive either NCO or reserve officer training. Yearly, some 500 women complete the voluntary military service, while some 30,000 men complete the obligatory conscription.

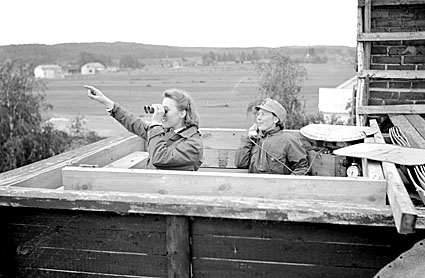
Members of Lotta Svärd in air control duty during the Continuation War

The women who have completed the voluntary military service are eligible for further military employment. If they have at least NCO training, they can apply for career NCO positions or for officer training. These career paths have been open since 1996, when the first women completed the military service. In 2005, 32 female career officers were in service. The number of female warrant officers was 16 and the number of female specialist officers 7. In comparison, there were a total of 2.584 officers and 894 specialist officers in service. The women made up about 16% of the total career NCO cadre. However, most of these career NCOs were grandfathered former female enlistees who had not undertaken military service.

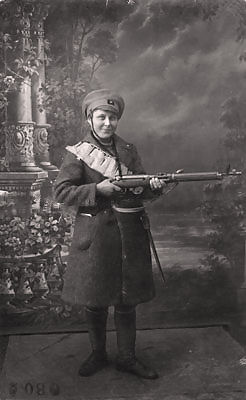
Female Red Guard soldier from Finnish Civil War

The history of women in the Finnish military is, however, far longer than just since 1995. During the Finnish Civil War, the Reds had several Naiskaarti (Women's Guard) units made of voluntary 16- to 35-year-old women, who were given rudimentary military training. The reactions on women in military were ambivalent during the Civil War. The fighting women of the Reds were shunned in the White propaganda but in the Red side propaganda they were admired and also compared to the "amazons of old". The White side founded their own female organization, Lotta Svärd in November 1918. While the Lottas were not front line fighting units per sé, as a paramilitary organization they handled several important second-line duties freeing men to the actual fighting service. A voluntary Lotta unit manned a searchlight battery of Finnish anti-aircraft artillery in defense of Helsinki in 1944. After the Continuation War, Lotta Svärd was declared a "paramilitary organization" and absolved in 1944.

In 1961, the Finnish Defence Forces started to enlist females for second-line duties. The duties available to women were radar operator, sea-control person, and C3 person. Most of the female enlisted served in coastal artillery and Finnish Air Force. The women enlisted all served in the rank of värvätty (enlisted), using a special female uniform. In 1994, the female enlisted were given the same status as military persons as the male enlisted. At the same time, the women who had undergone the voluntary military service received the possibility to be recruited for all military careers. In the beginning of the year 2007, the term enlisted (värvätty) was changed to NCO (aliupseeri) to better recognize the change in the duties of this personnel group. The female enlistees who had not undertaken military service were grandfathered. They remain in the rank of enlistee unless they complete the conscript NCO course.

The non-combat duties in Finnish Defence Forces peace-keeping operations opened to women in 1991. At first, the women without previous military training experienced rather large problems in the Finnish peace-keeping units, most remarkably in the Republic of Macedonia in the mid-1990s. Since the introduction of the voluntary military service, the women have mostly the same training as the men which has lessened the problems. Only a handful of women without military training, mostly nurses or social service personnel, are serving with the Finnish peace-keeping forces. All duties in Finnish foreign operations are open to women, provided they have the necessary military training.

== France ==
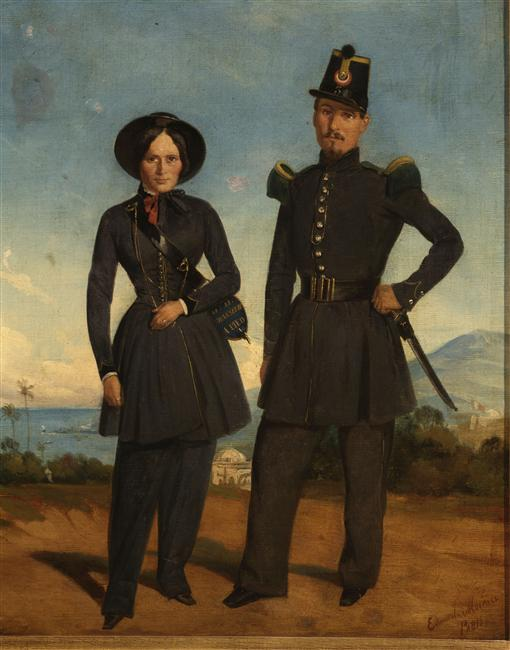
A Cantinière with a male infantry soldier in Algeria, around 1845. Painting by Edouard Moreau.

In the 1800s, women in the French military were responsible for preparing meals for soldiers, and were called Cantinières. They sold food to soldiers beyond that which was given to them as rations. Cantinières had commissions from the administrators of the regiments, and they were required to be married to a soldier of the regiment. They served near the front lines on active campaigns, and some served for as long as 30 years.

The role of women in the French military grew in 1914 with the recruitment of women as medical personnel (Service de Santé des Armées). In 1939, they were authorized to enlist with the armed service branches, and in 1972 their status evolved to share the same ranks as those of men. Valérie André, a neurosurgeon, became the first woman in France to attain the rank of three-star general as Médecin Général Inspecteur. A veteran of the French Resistance, she served overseas in Indochina. During that period, she learned how to pilot a helicopter so that she could reach wounded soldiers who were trapped in the jungle. André is the first woman to have flown a helicopter in combat. She received many decorations for her achievements, including the highest rank of the Legion of Honour. She retired from active service in 1981.

Today women can serve in every position in the French military, including submarines and combat infantry. Women make up around 15% of all service personnel in the combined branches of the French military. They are 11% of the Army forces, 16% of the Navy, 28% of the Air Force and 58% of the Medical Corps.

While the Foreign Legion does not accept women in its ranks, there was one official female member, Susan Travers, an Englishwoman who joined Free French Forces during World War II and became a member of the Foreign Legion after the war, serving in Vietnam during the First Indochina War. In October 2000 it was announced women would no longer be barred from service. However, this announcement was retracted one month later and blamed on a "miscommunication"; a spokesman confirmed the policy barring women from the Legion would remain unchanged.

== Germany ==
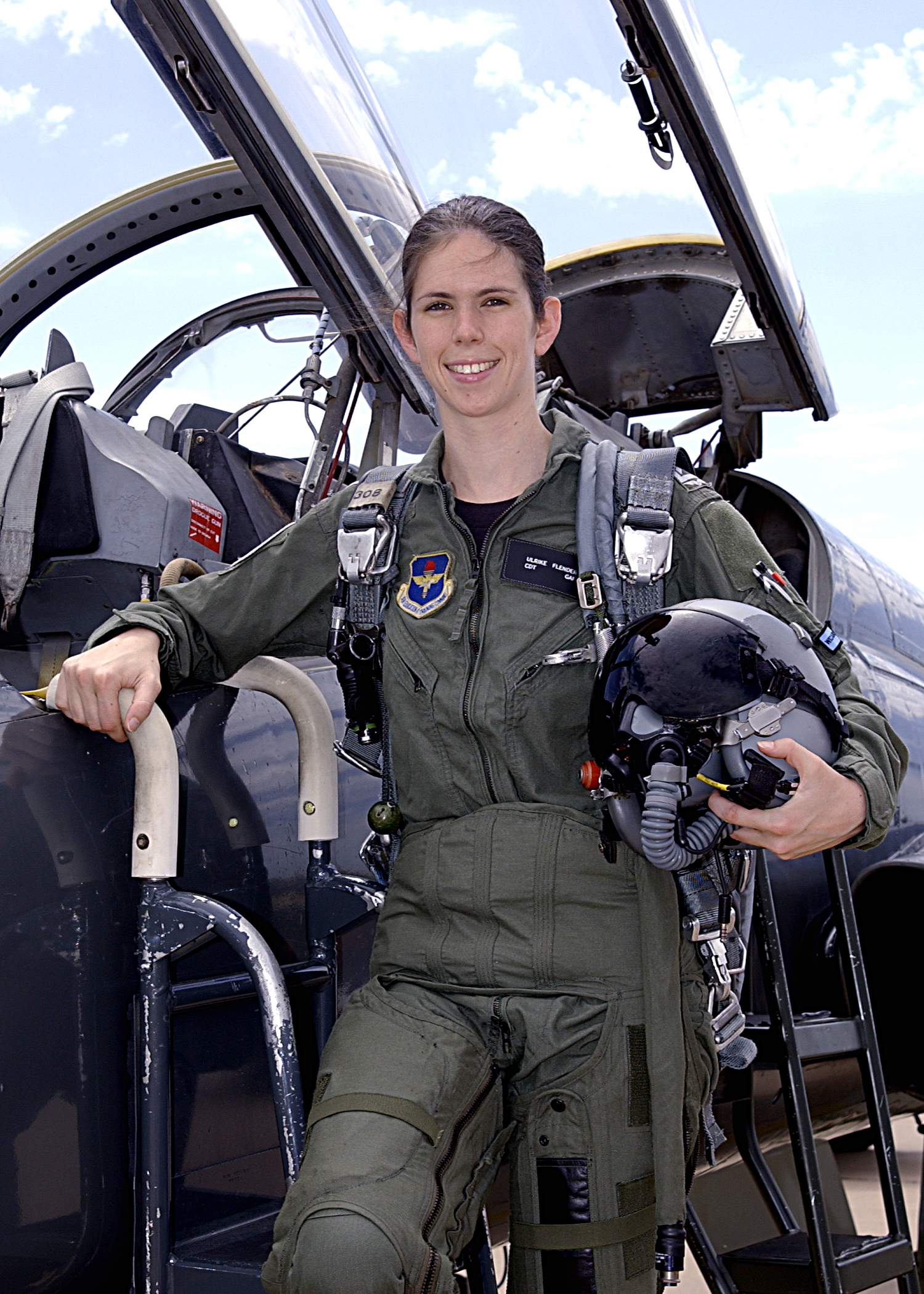
Ulrike Flender—in 2007 became the first female German Air Force jet-fighter pilot and first German female Panavia Tornado pilot.

Since the creation of the Bundeswehr in 1955, Germany had employed one of the most conservative gender-policies of any NATO country. That was generally regarded as a reaction to the deployment of young women at the end of World War II. Though women were exempt from direct combat functions in accordance with Nazi-ideology, several hundred thousand German women, along with young boys and sometimes girls (as Flakhelfer), served in Luftwaffe artillery units; their flak shot down thousands of Allied warplanes.

In the year 1975 the first female medical officers were appointed in the Sanitätsdienst (Medical corps) of the Bundeswehr. Since 1994, two women, Verena von Weymarn and Erika Franke, attained the rank of Generalarzt (Surgeon General). But it was not until January 2001 that women first joined German combat units, following a court ruling by the European Court of Justice. The change in the law was prompted after a qualified female electronics technician argued her case to the European Court of Justice after her application to join the Maintenance-Recovery Service (Electronics) technical unit of the German Armed Forces was rejected in 1996, citing "it is barred by German law for women to perform armed services". The court ruled that preventing women from occupying combat roles in the armed forces was against sexual equality principles. 244 of the first 1,900 women who signed up following the law change were admitted on the first day of the new rules, the majority of them joining the army and air force. There are no restrictions regarding the branch of service, and there are women serving in the Fallschirmjäger (paratrooper), aboard submarines and jet-fighter aircraft. Before the law change 4,400 women only occupied military medicine or military-band roles within the German armed forces. The new legislations initially did not receive full military support. A report on the subject commented that, regarding the older male soldiers, "The way they see themselves as male fighters is shattered". Like many countries who have accepted women into combat roles, Germany conducts special courses on preventing sexual harassment.

After several years of experience the commotion inside the Bundeswehr has now remarkably decreased. Today women are regularly being sent to foreign deployments. As of January 2010 about 16,900 female soldiers serve in the Bundeswehr, representing a share of 9 percent of all troops except conscripted soldiers. The German Bundeswehr now expects the percentage of all female personnel to rise to about 15 percent in the middle-term future.

In 2007 the first woman in the German air force received her jet-fighter licence. A handful more are flying helicopters and transport planes.

== Ireland ==
Women in the Irish Defence Forces may be assigned to "the full range of operational and administrative duties" and policy is to encourage increased female participation. As of 31 December 2018, 601 of 8,957 personnel (6.7%) of the Permanent Defence Forces were female. Historically, the Defence Act 1954 allowed for women only in the Army Nursing Service. Exceptionally, Brigid Lyons Thornton was a medical officer in the nascent Free State Army in 1923 to 1924. Fianna Fáil's manifesto in the 1977 general election proposed "a Women's Service Corps, Cór na mBan"; when it formed the next government it duly passed the Defence (Amendment) (No. 2) Act 1979, which removed statutory prohibition on women in enlisted ranks and commissioned officers. Conservatism from the general staff meant that until the early 1990s women were trained separately and restricted to light duties. The first female Irish Army recruits to the cadet school were in 1980 and the enlisted ranks in 1982. The first mixed-sex recruitment was in 1994. The 1990s saw integration, and the first women officers in the Naval Service in and the Air Corps. Originally the respective minimum heights for men and women were 5 feet 7 inches (1.70 m) and 5 feet 2 inches (1.57 m); in 1996 a common limit of 5 feet 5 inches (1.65 m) was introduced on the basis that differing limits discriminated against men; later the common limit was lowered to 5 feet 4 inches (1.63 m), and in 2006 to 5 ft 2 in, on the ground that the higher value excluded most women.

== Italy ==
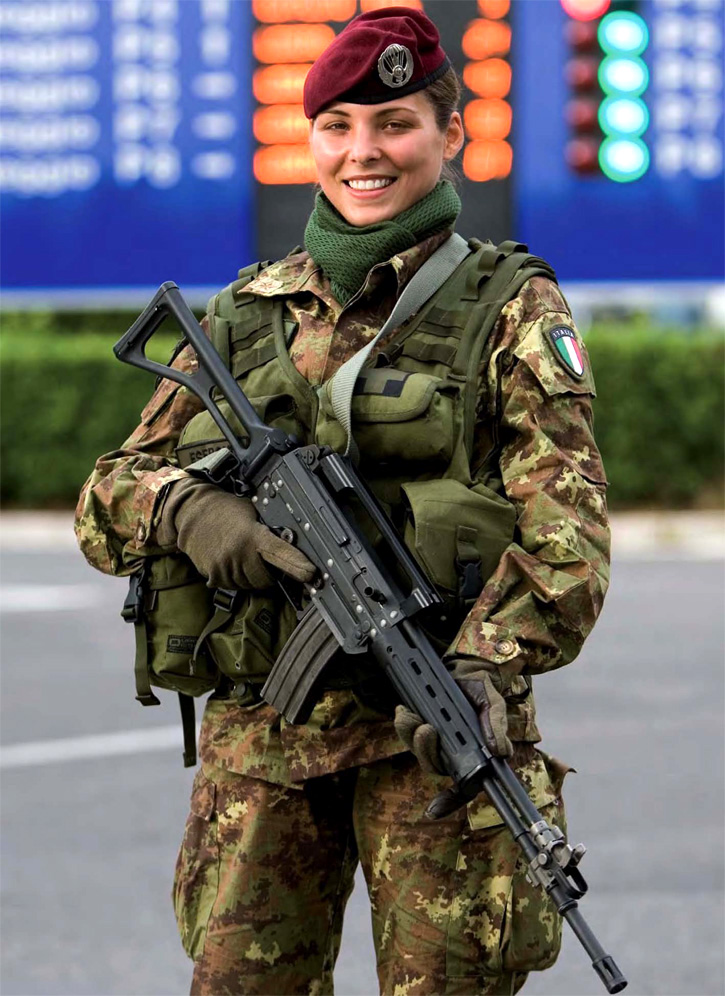
Italian parachutist

During World War II, the Italian Social Republic established the Female Auxiliary Service (Italian: Corpo volontario femmnile) as an auxiliary service and their soldiers were known as Female Auxiliary Unit (Italian: Servizio Ausiliario Femminile). The law that introduced this unit provided that its existence be limited to war periods. Its equivalent in Southern Italy during World War II, was the CAF, Italian: Corpo di Assistenza Femminile, that was on the side of the Allies. This unit was also dismissed at the end of the war. Those who belonged to this unit were equivalent to sub-lieutenants and wore military uniforms made in Great Britain. In 1959, the Female Police unit (Italian: Corpo di Polizia femminile) was established.

In 1981, Diadora Bussani was the first woman who asked to be admitted into the Italian Naval Academy of Livorno (Italian: Accademia navale di Livorno). She was born in 1962 in Trieste and started to try to join the academy in 1981. After being excluded from the application, Italy's regional administrative court upheld the appeal; however, Italy's State Council overturned the judgment. The enlisting of a woman seemed to be legally feasible because of the Italian law Legge 1963 n. 66, which allowed the enrollment of women in public positions, but Italy's State Council excluded the military because of biological differences between male and female human bodies. When Diadora Bussani became famous and the case was well-known, the United States Navy symbolically granted her enlistment on 2 November 1982.

Voluntary female military service was introduced in 1999 with the Italian law Legge 20 ottobre 1999 n. 380, which introduced the possibility of being admitted to the army for women. Italy was the last country among NATO members to allow women to deploy.

Nowadays women are present in all branches of Italian armed forces, including the police, and the Guardia di Finanza, and they are also employed for military missions abroad. Before the year 2000, women were employed in war only as voluntary nurses inside the organizations Croce Rossa Italiana and of Corpo delle infermiere volontarie dell'ACISMOM. 235º Reggimento fanteria "Piceno" is the training center for women inside the Italian Army.

== Norway ==
Women in Norway have been serving in military roles since 1938. During the Second World War both enlisted women and female officers served in all branches of the military. However, in 1947 political changes commanded that women only serve in civilian posts, with reservists allowing women to join in 1959.

Between 1977 and 1984, the Norwegian Parliament passed laws expanding the role of women in the Norwegian Armed Forces, and in 1985 equal opportunities legislation was applied to the military. In 1995, Norway became the first country to allow women to serve on its military submarines.

In a further step in favour of gender equality in the armed services, the Norwegian parliament voted, with a strong majority, the 14th of June 2014, a bill to extend compulsory military service to females from mid-2016. Norway is the first European country to make national service compulsory for both sexes. It will apply to all medically fit Norwegian citizens between age 19-44 born from 1997 onwards. Women born in 1997 and onwards will also be subject to conscription during wartime.

As of 2017, 1341 of the 11596 military personnel in the Norwegian military forces were women (12%). Of all the conscripted soldiers the same year, the female percentage was 23%.

On 26 January 2017, major general Tonje Skinnarland became the first-ever appointed woman to be the head of the Royal Norwegian air force.

== Poland ==
Women have taken part in the battles for independence against occupiers and invaders since at least the time of the Napoleonic Wars - most notably Emilia Plater. During the occupation by the Nazis, 1939–1945, several thousand women took part in the resistance movement as members of the Home Army. The Germans were forced to establish special prisoner-of-war camps after the Warsaw Rising in 1944 to accommodate over a thousand women prisoners.

In April 1938 the law requiring compulsory military service for men included provisions for voluntary service of women in auxiliary roles, in the medical services, in the anti-aircraft artillery and in communications. In 1939 a Women's Military Training Organization was established under the command of Maria Wittek.

In present Poland a law passed April 6, 2004 requires all women with college nursing or veterinary degrees to register for compulsory service. In addition it allows women to volunteer and serve as professional personnel in all services of the army. As of June 30, 2007 there are 800 women in the army, of which 471 are officers, 308 non-commissioned officers and 21 other ranks, in addition 225 are in military training schools.

== Russia ==
The first woman known to have enlisted in the Russian Army was Nadezhda Durova who, pretending to be a man, fought with distinction in the Napoleonic Wars. At that time, however, she was very much of a unique exception in an all-male army.

During the First World War, heavy defeats led to the loss of millions of Russian Imperial soldiers. To psychologically energize morale Alexander Kerensky (leader of Russia of the Russian Provisional Government) ordered the creation of the Woman's Death Battalion in May 1917. After three months of fighting, the size of this all-female unit fell from 2,000 to 250. In November 1917, the Bolsheviks dissolved the unit. Shortly after Russia became part of the Soviet Union (see above for the role of woman in Soviet military) until December 1991.

The current tally of woman in the Russian Army is standing at around 115,000 to 160,000, representing 10% of Russia's military strength. They're not allowed in combat roles, however.

The Russian army runs the Miss Russian Army beauty contest for attractive female Russian soldiers. Colonel Gennady Dzyuba, of the Defense Ministry, said of the 2005 contest that "Those who have served, especially in hot spots, know the importance of women in the armed forces."

== Serbia ==
Although the Serbian combat forces were traditionally exclusively male (with exception of nurses and some other non-combat roles) there were some exceptions. Several women are known to have fought in the ranks in the Balkan Wars and the First World War, often by initially hiding their gender to work around the draft regulations. The most notable of them was Milunka Savić. In the Second World War Yugoslav partisan units accepted female volunteers as combatants as well as medical personnel. After the war the practice was abandoned, but was reintroduced recently with professionalisation of the army.

In Yugoslavia (including Serbia and other states), two million women were directly involved in non-combat support roles with Yugoslavia's partisans, and 100,000 served in the partisan army during World War II.

== Soviet Union: 1922–1991 ==
Women had the legal right to serve in the Soviet Armed Forces throughout the post Second World War period, with many all-female units existing as far back as World War One. By the early 1990s, 100,000 women made up 3% of the Soviet Armed Forces.

During the Second World War, the Soviet Union had a female military strength of over one million women who served as snipers, machine gunners, and tank crew members. Very few of these women, however, were ever promoted to officers.

In 1942 the Soviet Union formed three regiments of women combat pilots to fly night bombing missions over Germany, the 588th Night Bomber Regiment, later called the 46th Taman Guards Night Bomber Aviation Regiment. These women took part in regular harassment bombing against the Germans in Polikarpov Po-2 biplanes, and participated in the final onslaught against Berlin. The regiments, collectively known to the Germans as the "Nachthexen" ("Night Witches"), flew more than 24,000 sorties and won in total 23 Hero of the Soviet Union medals. Some of the most talented women pilots were assigned day fighter duties. "Lily" Litvak and Katya Budanova became fighter aces flying the Soviet Union's best fighter designs alongside men in day attacks. Both were killed in their aircraft. Meanwhile, in the ground combat role Lyudmila Pavlichenko, made 309 confirmed kills including 36 enemy snipers. Pavlichenko was one of the many female snipers of the Soviet Army.

In 1967, the Soviet Universal Military Duty Laws concluded that women offered the greater source of available combat soldiers during periods of large-scale mobilisation. Thus, several programs during the height of the cold war were set up to encourage women to enlist. Participation in military orientated youth programs and forced participation in the reserves for ex-servicewomen up to the age of 40 are some examples. Universities contained reservist officer training which accompanied a place in the reserves themselves.

In the Soviet Union civil universities, in addition to professional education, gave basic military training to the youth of both sexes. Many secondary schools in post-Soviet countries still have defense lessons, both for boys and girls.

== Sweden ==
In the Military Articles of 1621, which organized the Swedish Army, military men on all levels were explicitly allowed to bring their wives with them to war, as the wives were regarded to fill an important role as sutlers in the house hold organisation of the army: prostitutes, however, were banned. This regulation was kept until the Military Article of 1798, though the presence of women diminished after the end of the Great Northern War. In the Military Article of 1798, the only women allowed to accompany the army was the professional unmarried female sutlers, in Sweden named marketenterska. Unofficially, however, there were females who served in the army posing as male the entire period, the most famous being Ulrika Eleonora Stålhammar.

In 1924, the Swedish Women's Voluntary Defence Organization ("Lottorna") was founded as an auxiliary defense organization. The organization remains to this day as a part of the Swedish Armed Forces.

Since 1989 there are no gender restrictions in the Swedish Armed Forces on access to military training or positions. Women are allowed to serve in all parts of the military and in all positions, including combat.

In 2019, Sweden introduced female conscription. This made Sweden the second nation in the world (after Norway) to draft women on the same formal terms as men.

== Turkey ==
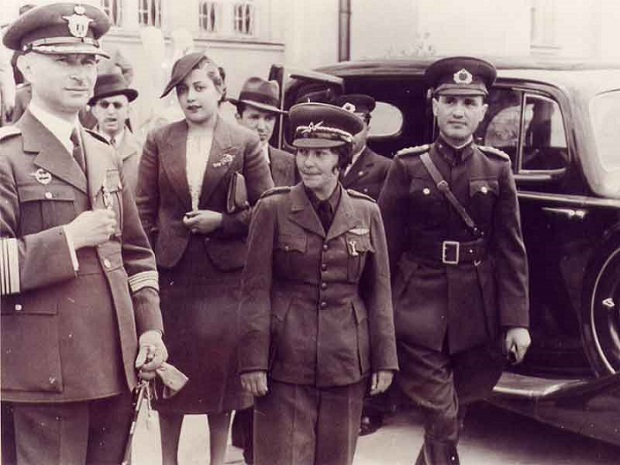
Sabiha Gökçen was the first female pilot to fly during a conflict, 1937

When Turkish history is examined, it is apparent that Turkish women have voluntarily taken tasks in the defence of their country, showing the same power and courage as men. Nene Hatun, whose monument has been erected in the city of Erzurum (Eastern Turkey) because of her gallant bravery during the Ottoman-Russian War, constitutes a very good example of this fact. Furthermore, the Independence War has taken its place in history with the unsurpassed heroism of Turkish women. Sabiha Gökçen was the first female combat pilot in the world, as well as the first Turkish female aviator. She was one of the eight adoptive children of Mustafa Kemal Atatürk. Throughout her career in the Turkish Air Force, Gökçen flew 22 different types of aircraft for more than 8,000 hours, 32 hours of which were active combat and bombardment missions. She was selected as the only female pilot for the poster of "20 Greatest Aviators in History" published by the United States Air Force in 1996.

Women personnel are being employed as officers in the Turkish Armed Forces today. The women officers serve together with the men under the same respective chains of command. The personnel policy regarding women in the Turkish Armed Forces is based on the principle of "needing qualified women officers in suitable branches and ranks" to keep pace with technological advancements in the 21st century. Women civilian personnel have been assigned to the headquarters staff, technical fields, and social services without sexual discrimination. Women officers serve in all branches except armour, infantry, and submarines. Assignments, promotions and training are considered on an equal basis with no gender bias.

As of the year 2005, the number of the female officers and NCOs in the Turkish Armed Forces is 1245.

Current squadron leader of the aerobatics team Turkish Stars, Major Esra Ozatay assumed the role on 8 September 2016. She is the first and only female pilot holding the position in the Turkish Air Force.

== United Kingdom ==
As of the 21st of December 2018 women are able to occupy any role in the British Armed Forces. Previously they could be in any role that was not ground close combat (CGC). This change was started in 2016, when the ban on women in ground close combat roles was lifted by the then prime minister, David Cameron. The first CGC branch to accept women was the Royal Armoured Corps, in November 2016. The RAF was next to open its doors in September 2017. The first female officer of The Life Guards, Captain Elizabeth Godwin, was commissioned in 2020.

There are 15,340 female personnel as of the 1st of April 2019, which is roughly 11% of the British armed forces. Plenty of female combatants can be found throughout Britain's military history, including Queen Elizabeth II, who joined the Auxiliary Territorial Service in 1945 and trained as a driver and mechanic.

An early example is Queen Boudica, who led warriors of the Iceni tribe against Roman forces occupying Britain around AD 62, her legacy being often quoted in support of arguments calling for the full opening up of the British Armed forces to women.

In the medieval period, Queens and noblewomen such as Ethelfleda of Mercia, Matilda of England, Isabella of France and Margaret of Anjou commanded armies in battle, although they did not fight themselves. Many women including Queen Eleanor of Aquitaine accompanied their husbands on Crusade. In the 16th century Mary, Queen of Scots, accompanied troops in several campaigns. Women continued to lead armies or organise the defense of castles in the absence of their male relatives until the close of the English Civil War. Charles I's consort, Henrietta Maria of France was the last English queen to command troops in battle in northern England in 1643.

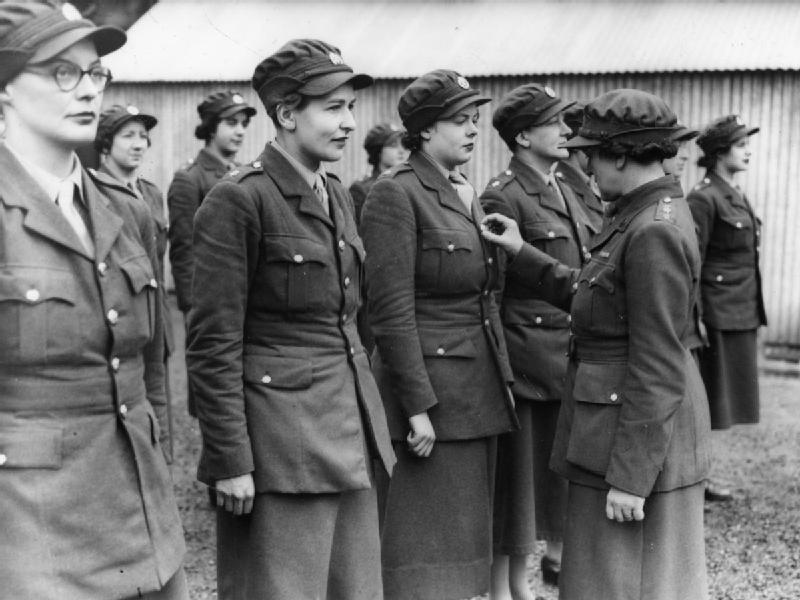
Auxiliary Territorial Service, 1940

During the 1776 American War of Independence, it is estimated that over 5,000 women accompanied British forces. Many of these would have been the wives of high-ranking officers, with a large proportion being the wives of serving soldiers. While as much as possible women were left in the camp, they sometimes accompanied forces in their baggage trains serving as cooks or nurses, and were occasionally caught in combat and killed or taken prisoner. Similarly women accompanied men in ships of the Royal Navy, in combat being employed as powder monkeys or assisting surgeons.

During World War I the British Women's Army Auxiliary Corps was formed; Lieutenant-General H Lawson recommended using it in France in 1917. Sir Neville Macready, the Adjutant-General, supported the idea that women and men should be treated the same at the front. Women served in the British Army during World War One as cooks, medical staff and clerical staff, however women were not permitted to be officers, and there were many disputes over pay. In 1917 the Women's Royal Naval Service (WRNS) was formed, although then disbanded in 1919 It provided catering and administrative support, communications and electrician personnel.

Prior to World War II, in 1938 the Auxiliary Territorial Service (ATS) was created, with 20,000 women serving in non-combat roles during the conflict as well as serving as military police. Some women took part in direct combat roles as part of mixed gender teams manning heavy anti-aircraft batteries and gun crews within Britain. Women members of the teams might sight and aim anti-aircraft guns and even give the command to fire, but the actual release of the trigger was always (officially at least) reserved for a male soldier. A number of women operated on active service in wartime Europe with special services, engaged in intelligence, sabotage and liaison with local resistance groups. During the war, the First Aid Nursing Yeomanry was incorporated into the ATS. The WRNS was reformed at the outbreak of war in 1939, with an increased range of shore-based opportunities available.

In 1949 women were officially recognized as a permanent part of British Armed forces, although full combat roles were still available only to men. In this year, the Women's Royal Army Corps was created to replace the WAAC, and in 1950 the ranks were normalised with the ranks of men serving in the British Army.

The 1991 Gulf War marked the first deployment of British women in combat operations since 1945. Women were engaged in a broad range of support operations up to 8 km from the front line. In 1992 British Army units devoted only to women were disbanded, and women were distributed amongst the same units in which men served. During the 1990s an increasing number of roles were opened up to women including direct combat support roles in intelligence, artillery, engineering and signals. In 1991 seagoing opportunities were opened to WRNS personnel leading to the full integration of the WRNS with the Royal Navy in 1993. To date several female personnel have commanded small ships of the RN and a recently retired Commanding Officer of HM Naval Base, Clyde, Commodore Carolyn Stait, is a former WRNS Officer.

The seizure of Royal Navy sailor Faye Turney in 2007 by the naval forces of the Iranian Revolutionary Guard led to some media comment on the role of women and mothers in the armed forces.

== See also ==
- Women in the military by country
- Women's roles in the World Wars
- Women in the First World War
