= 1st Guards Tank Army =

Russian Ground Forces formation

1st Guards Tank Army (1944–1999, 2014–present) 1st Tank Army (1942–1944)
- 1-я гвардейская танковая Краснознамённая армия
- Great emblem of the 1st Guards Tank Army
- Active: 1942–1999, 2014–present
- Branch: Red Army; Soviet Army; Russian Ground Forces
- Type: Armoured
- Role: Breakthrough and exploitation in deep operations
- Part of: Group of Soviet Forces in Germany; Moscow Military District; Western Military District; Moscow Military District
- Garrison/HQ: Bakovka, Odintsovo, Moscow Oblast
- Engagements: World War II; Battle of Stalingrad; Battle of Kursk; Battle of Poznań (1945); Battle of Berlin; Russo-Ukrainian War; Russian invasion of Ukraine; Eastern Ukraine campaign; Battle of Kharkiv; Battle of Izium; Kharkiv counteroffensive; Battle of Bakhmut; Luhansk Oblast campaign; Kupiansk offensive; 2023 Ukrainian counteroffensive; 2024 Kharkiv offensive; Kursk campaign
- Decorations: Order of the Red Banner
- Battle honours: Guards

Commanders
- Current commander: Guards Lieutenant general Vitaly Podlesny
- Notable commanders: Kirill Moskalenko; Mikhail Katukov

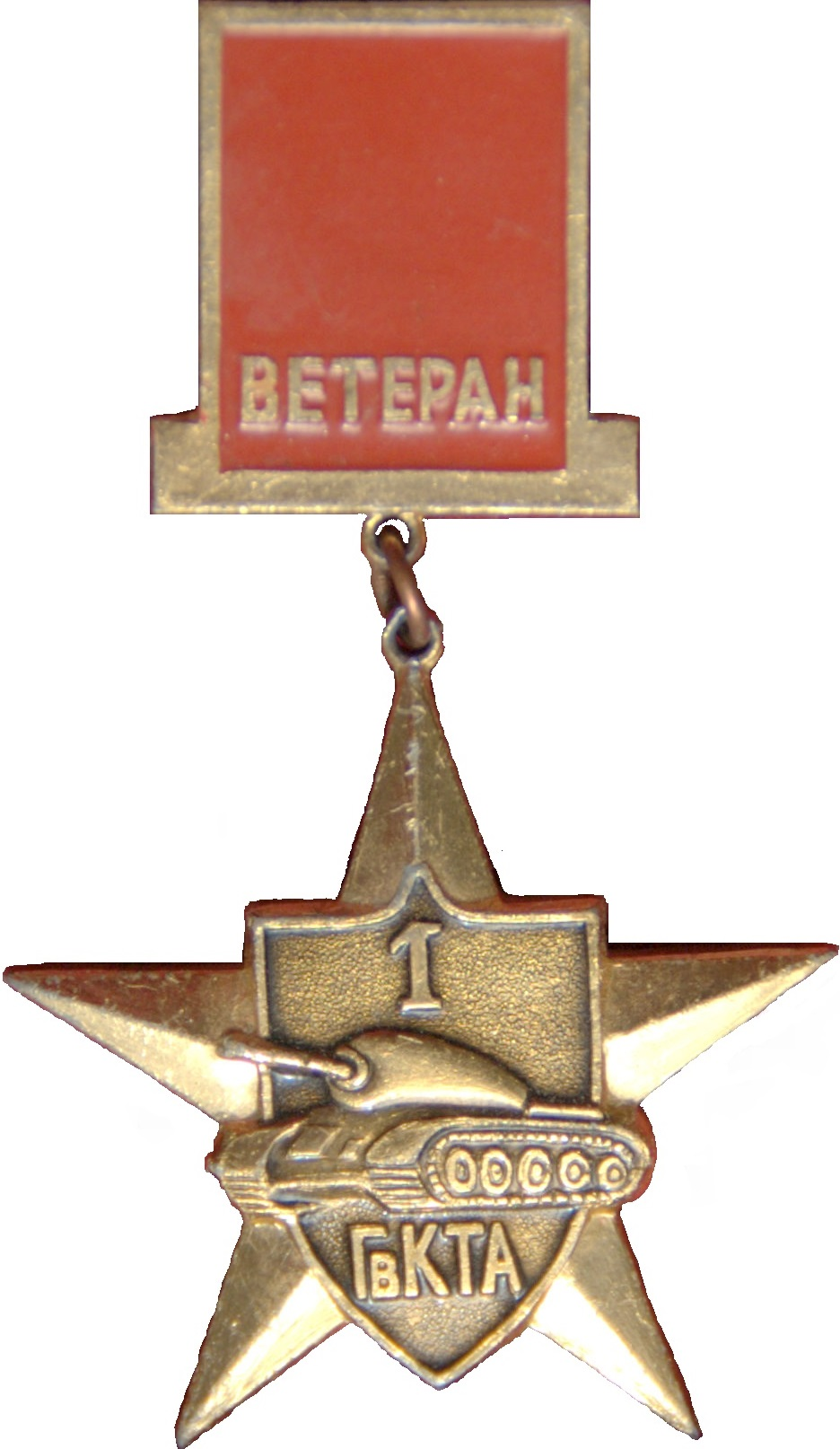
The lapel badge given to veterans of the 1st Guards Tank Army

The 1st Guards Tank Red Banner Army (Note: Russian: 1-я гвардейская танковая Краснознамённая армия, romanized: 1-ya gvardeyskaya tankovaya Krasnoznamonnaya armiya) (Military Unit Number 73621) has been the only tank army of the Russian Ground Forces since its restoration in 2014. It was previously one of the tank armies of the Soviet Union during World War II and the Cold War.

The army traces its heritage back to the 1st Tank Army, formed twice in July 1942 and in January 1943 and converted into the 1st Guards Tank Army in January 1944. The army fought as part of the Red Army on the Eastern Front during World War II. The army was commanded throughout most of the war by Mikhail Katukov.

It fought on the defensive during Case Blue, ultimately being partially destroyed and disbanded. After its reformation in 1943, it participated in the Battle of Kursk, the Proskurov-Chernovtsy Operation, the Lvov-Sandomierz Operation, the Vistula-Oder Offensive and the Battle of Berlin. After the war, the army was stationed in East Germany as part of the Group of Soviet Forces in Germany.

After the end of the Cold War and the resultant withdrawal of Soviet units in Germany, the army was relocated to Smolensk, and disbanded in 1999. The army was reformed in 2014 as part of Russia's military expansion. This reformed army fought in the Russian invasion of Ukraine, where it was claimed to have suffered heavy casualties following its eventual retreats from the northeast Ukraine and later from Kharkiv. After being reconstituted, the army fought against the 2023 Ukrainian counteroffensive, and later fought in the Kupiansk offensive.

== First formation ==
The 1st Tank Army was first formed within the Stalingrad Front from the 38th Army in July 1942, under the command of Major General Kirill Moskalenko. The army was encircled and partially destroyed. It was disbanded as a result in August 1942, its headquarters becoming the Southeastern Front headquarters.

== Second formation ==
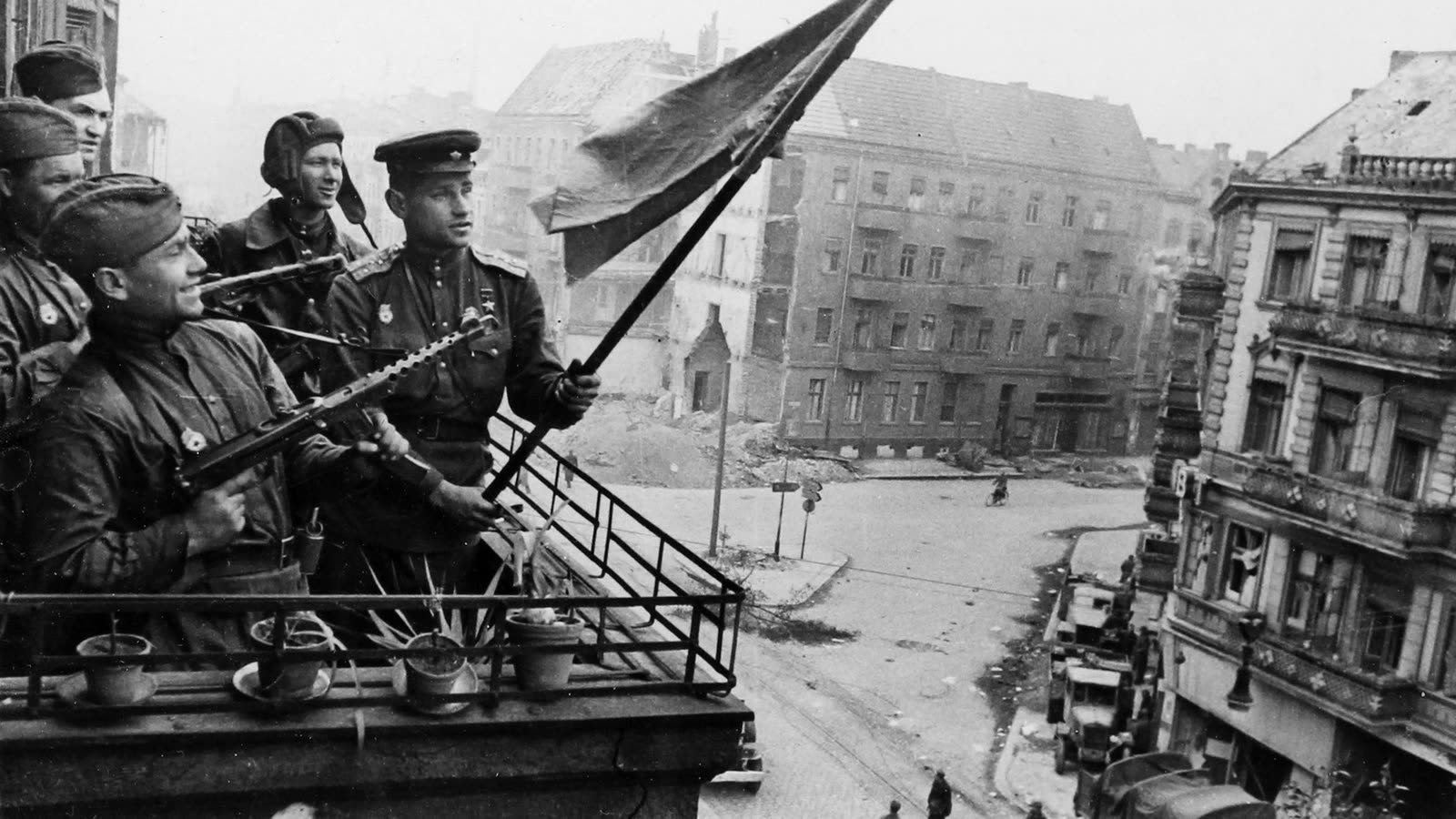
Hero of the Soviet Union Captain Fyodor Akimovich Lipatkin, a company commander of the army's 11th Separate Guards Heavy Tank Regiment, raises the Red flag on the balcony of a house in Berlin, 26 April 1945

The 1st Tank Army was formed a second time on 30 January 1943 (order No. 46021) from the headquarters of the 29th Army, under the command of famous armoured troops commander Lieutenant General of Tank Troops Mikhail Katukov, personally appointed by Stalin. The army was transferred to the North-Western Front. The 3rd Mechanised Corps (later to become 8th Guards Mechanised Corps) and 6th Tank Corps (later to become 11th Guards Tank Corps) joined it on formation, and served with the army throughout the war. It was quickly transferred to the Voronezh Front for the defense of the Kursk salient's southern shoulder, adding the newly formed 31st Tank Corps to its subordinate commands.

Its order of battle prior to Operation Citadel was as follows:

1st Tank Army

- 3rd Mechanized Corps (Major General of Tank Forces Semyon Krivoshein)
  - 1st Mechanized Brigade
  - 3rd Mechanized Brigade
  - 10th Mechanized Brigade
  - 49th Tank Brigade
  - 58th Motorcycle Battalion,
  - 35th Tank Destroyer Regiment
  - 265th Mortar Regiment
  - 405th Guards Mortar Battalion*
- 6th Tank Corps (Major General of Tank Forces Andrei Getman)
  - 22nd Tank Brigade
  - 112nd Tank Brigade
  - 200th Tank Brigade
  - 6th Motor Rifle Brigade
  - 85th Motorcycle Battalion
  - 1461st Self Propelled Artillery Regiment
  - 538th Tank Destroyer Regiment
  - 270th Mortar Regiment
- 31st Tank Corps (Major General of Tank Forces D. Kh. Chernienko)
  - 100th Tank Brigade
  - 237th Tank Brigade
  - 242nd Tank Brigade
- 71st Engineer Battalion
- 267th Engineer Battalion
- 316th Guards Mortar Regiment*
- 8th Anti-Aircraft Artillery Division
  - 797th Anti-Aircraft Artillery Regiment
  - 848th Anti-Aircraft Artillery Regiment
  - 978th Anti-Aircraft Artillery Regiment
  - 1063rd Anti-Aircraft Artillery Regiment
- Guards Mortar Regiment (or Battalion) (Russian: гвардейский минометный полк (дивизион)) was the overt designation used for Katyusha rocket launcher units.

== First Guards Tank Army ==
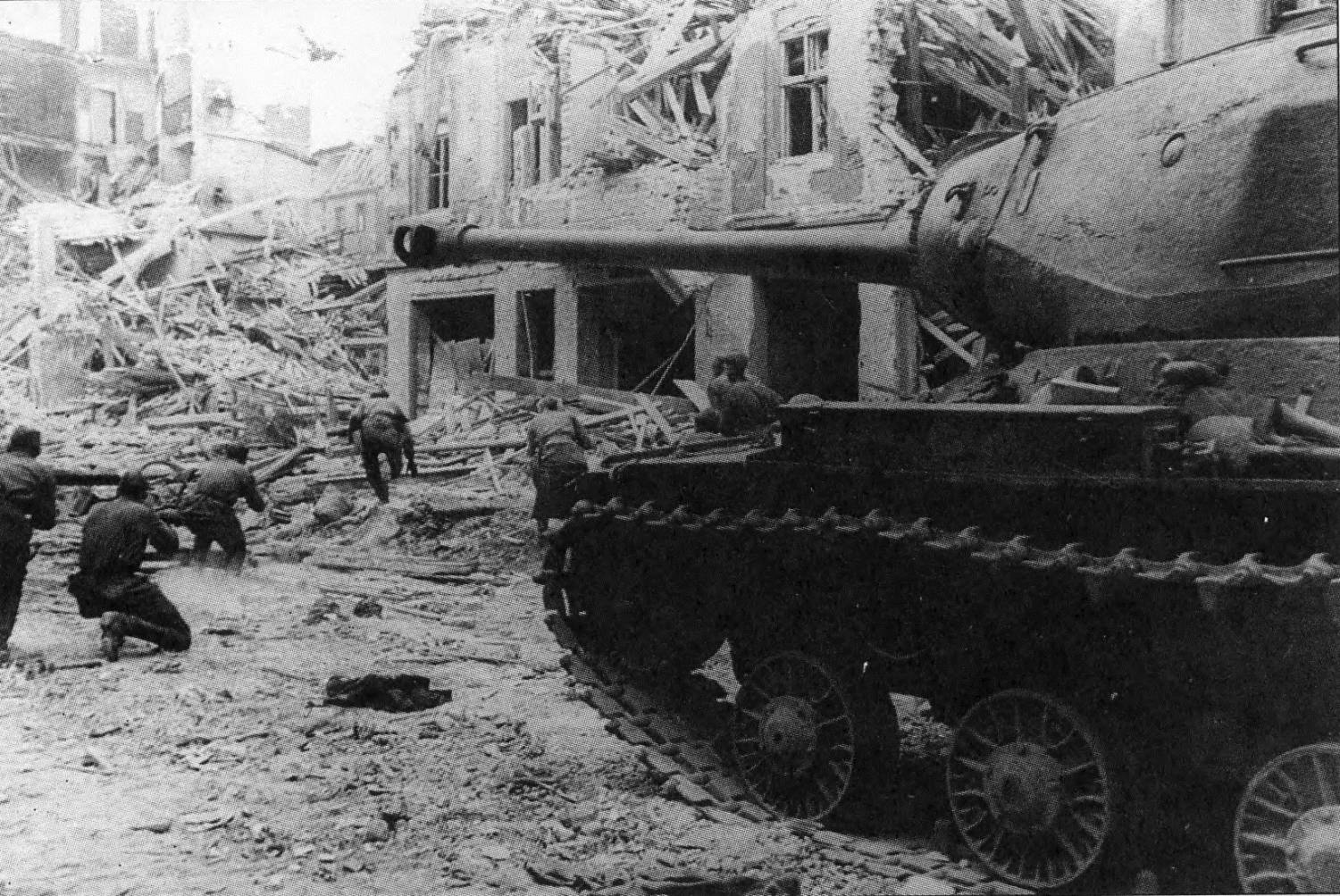
Lipatkin's IS-2 tank supporting infantry in Berlin, 27 April

After Kursk, 1st Tank Army participated in the Proskurov-Chernovtsy Operation, the Lvov-Sandomierz Operation, the Vistula-Oder Offensive, and the Battle of Berlin. It was awarded a Guards title and became the 1st Guards Tank Army in April 1944, and Katukov was promoted to Colonel General.

On 1 January 1945, the Army's principal combat formations were:

- 8th Guards Mechanized Corps (Major General Ivan Dremov) (3 January 1944 – 9 May 1945)
  - 19th Guards Mechanized Brigade
  - 20th Guards Mechanized Brigade
  - 21st Guards Mechanized Brigade
  - 1st Guards Tank Brigade
  - 48th Guards Separate Tank Regiment
  - 353rd Guards Self-Propelled Artillery Regiment
  - 400th Guards Self-Propelled Artillery Regiment
  - 265th Guards Mortar Regiment *
  - 405th Guards Mortar Battalion *
  - 358th Guards Anti-Aircraft Artillery Regiment
  - 8th Guards Motorcycle Battalion
- 11th Guards Tank Corps (Colonel Hamazasp Babadzhanian) (25 August 1944 – 9 May 1945)
  - 40th Guards Tank Brigade
  - 44th Guards Tank Brigade
  - 45th Guards Tank Brigade
  - 27th Guards Motor Rifle Brigade
  - 399th Guards Heavy Self-Propelled Artillery Regiment
  - 362nd Guards Self-Propelled Artillery Regiment
  - 1454th Self-Propelled Artillery Regiment
  - 350th Light Artillery Regiment
  - 270th Guards Mortar Regiment *
  - 53rd Guards Mortar Battalion *
  - 1018th Anti-Aircraft Artillery Regiment
  - 9th Guards Motorcycle Battalion
- Army Troops
  - 64th Guards Tank Brigade
  - 11th Guards Separate Tank Regiment
  - 19th Light Self-Propelled Artillery Brigade
  - 197th Light Artillery Brigade
  - 79th Guards Mortar Regiment *
  - 17th Motorised Engineer Brigade
  - 191st Guards Liaison Aviation Regiment
  - 6th Motorcycle Regiment
  - 12th Guards Motorcycle Regiment
- Guards Mortar Regiment (or Battalion) (Russian: гвардейский минометный полк (дивизион)) was the overt designation used for Katyusha rocket launcher units.

== Cold War ==
The 1st Guards Tank Army was awarded the Order of the Red Banner postwar. It became part of the Soviet occupation force in Germany, known as Group of Soviet Forces in Germany, with its headquarters in Dresden. In 1968, it, along with the 11th Guards Tank and 20th Guards Motor Rifle Divisions, took part in the Soviet invasion of Czechoslovakia, after which the units returned to their garrisons.

In the late 1980s the Army included the 20th Guards Motor Rifle Division, 9th Tank Division, and 11th Guards Tank Division. The headquarters was withdrawn to Smolensk, in the Moscow Military District in the early 1990s, and lost the 'Tank' from its title in 1995. In its last period within the Russian Army it comprised the 4th Guards 'Kantemir' Tank Division and the 144th Motor Rifle Division (which had been withdrawn from Tallinn in Estonia).

In July 1992 the 336th Independent Helicopter Regiment returned from Germany to Oreshkovo airfield and was placed under the Moscow Military District. The regiment then came under 1st Guards Tank Army from 31 December 1992.

1st Guards Tank Army was disbanded in 1998.

=== 1988 structure ===
The army's composition in 1988 was (with main equipment), with honorific titles in italics:

- Army Headquarters, Dresden
  - 234th Separate Guard and Security Battalion, Dresden
- 3rd Separate Guards Carpathian Communications Regiment, Dresden
- 253rd Separate Radio Engineering Regiment, Merseburg
- 51st Separate Radio Engineering Battalion, Dresden
- 106th Separate Electronic Warfare Battalion, Dresden
- 595th Separate Intelligence Gathering Battalion, Chemnitz (K-611)
- 6th Separate Airborne Battalion, Dresden
- 308th Artillery Brigade, Zeithain (2c5 Hyacinth)
- 181st Guards Novozybkovskaya Red Banner Orders of Suvorov and Alexander Nevsky Missile Brigade, Kochstedt
- 432nd Missile Brigade, Wurzen
- 53rd Anti-Aircraft Rocket Brigade, Altenburg
- 443rd Separate Engineer and Combat Engineering Battalion, Dresden
- 68th Pontoon Bridge Regiment, Dresden
- 41st Materiel Support Brigade, Dresden
  - 303rd Separate Repair and Recovery Battalion, Dresden
  - 338th Separate Repair and Recovery Battalion, Dresden
- 225th Separate Attack Helicopter Regiment, Allstedt (Mil Mi-24)
- 485th Separate Attack Helicopter Regiment, Brandis (Mil Mi-24)
- 6th Separate Transport Helicopter Squadron, Klotzsche (Mil Mi-8)
- 9th Bobruisk-Berlin Order of the Red Banner Order of Suvorov Tank Division, Riesa
- 11th Guards Berlin-Carpathian Tank Division, Dresden
- 20th Guards Taganrog Red Banner Order of the Suvorov Division Motor Rifle Division, Grimma

== Reactivation ==
After a 15-year hiatus, the 1st Guards Tank Army was reconstituted in November 2014. It was reportedly planned to consist of 500–600 tanks, 600–800 infantry fighting vehicles, 300–400 field artillery units and 35,000 to 50,000 soldiers.

The army was formed as the main ground forces manoeuvre and reserve operational formation of the Western Military District, in addition to the 6th Combined Arms Army (headquartered in Saint Petersburg) and the 20th Guards Combined Arms Army (headquartered in Voronezh). It is considered an elite formation of the Russian Ground Forces. The army carries on the traditions of the chronologically first army of the Soviet Union to reach 'Guards' status.

It commands the 2nd Guards Motor Rifle and the 4th Tank Divisions, which are considered the elite formations of their respective combat arms. The most decorated divisions of the Soviet Army, they were garrisoned the closest to Moscow for the city's defense. Due to their proximity to the capital, extra scrutiny was applied to personnel of these formations, making these postings especially prestigious. These units received the latest hardware and were thus known as the 'household' divisions of the Soviet Army. Their loyalty to the government was demonstrated by their involvement in the 1991 Soviet coup d'état attempt. The divisions retained their elite status within the Russian Army. The army also included the 27th Separate Guards Motor Rifle Brigade. While the 4th Guards Tank Division uses T-80 tanks, the rest of the Army uses T-72B and T-90 tanks, and Kurganets-25 fighting vehicles.

As of 2017 the Army was composed of:

- Army Headquarters (Odintsovo, Moscow Oblast)
- 60th Command Brigade (Selyatino village near Odintsovo, Moscow Oblast)
- 2nd Guards Motor Rifle 'Tamanskaya' Division (Kalininets, Moscow Oblast) (MUN 23626)
- 4th Guards Tank 'Kantemirovskaya' Division (Naro-Fominsk, Moscow Oblast) (T-80) (MUN 19612)
- 47th Tank 'Chenstokhovskaya' Division (Mulino, Nizhny Novgorod Oblast, established 2022)
- 27th Guards Motor Rifle 'Sevastopol' Brigade (Mosrentgen, Moscow City)
- 112th Guards Missile 'Novorossiysk' Brigade (Shuya, Ivanovo Oblast) (9K720 Iskander)
- 288th Guards Artillery 'Warsaw' Brigade (Mulino, Nizhny Novgorod Oblast)
- 49th Anti-Aircraft Rocket Brigade (Krasnyi Bor, Smolensk Oblast) (Buk-M2)
- 96th Reconnaissance Brigade (Sormovo, Nizhny Novgorod City)
- 20th NBC Defence Regiment (Tsentralny, Nizhny Novgorod Oblast) (MUN 12102)
- 69th Logistics Brigade (Dzerzhinsk, Nizhny Novgorod Oblast)

== Russo-Ukrainian War ==
During the prelude to the Russian invasion of Ukraine, elements of the 1st Guards Tank Army were reported to have forward deployed to the Pogonovo training ground south of Voronezh. Main battle tanks, self-propelled and towed artillery, and long-range multiple rocket launchers (MRLs), reportedly drawn from the 4th Guards Tank Division and the 2nd Motorised Rifle Division, were reported to have been positioned in the vicinity of Voronezh. A few months before the invasion, the 47th Guards Tank Division was formed from the 6th Separate Guards Tank Brigade.

During the February 2022 Russian invasion of Ukraine, the 1st GTA was part of the Western Group of Forces, formed by the Western Military District. The formation received the strategic direction of advancing on Poltava through Sumy and Kharkiv. Units of the army's 4th Guards Tank Division, including the 12th and 13th Guards Tank Regiments, were reported to have been among the Russian forces which occupied Trostianets. Members of the 1st GTA's 2nd Guards Motor Rifle Division were sentenced in absentia to imprisonment by Ukrainian courts for alleged war crimes including the shelling of the city hospital of Trostianets and ordering the killing of a civilian in Boromlia, both in Sumy Oblast.

After the failure of the initial advance, the Western Group of Forces was shifted to the easternmost part of Kharkiv Oblast in late March and early April 2022, from where its forces advanced south along the Oskil river towards Izium and Slavyansk. Units of the 1st Guards Tank Army were reported in Kharkiv Oblast as of 17 March, when the Ukrainian military claimed to have stopped a column belonging to the 47th Division's 26th Tank Regiment near Kamyanka, Kharkiv Oblast. By the beginning of April, elements of the 1st Guards Tank Army had been redeployed from Sumy Oblast to Izium in the Kharkiv Oblast. By mid-April their advance stopped, and the Western Group of Forces settled into defensive positions forty kilometers northwest of Slavyansk, and south of Izium. Ukraine reported in May 2022 that the Ukrainian Main Intelligence Directorate had obtained documents showing that after three weeks of fighting the 1st GTA had sustained 409 casualties (61 KIA, 209 WIA, 44 missing, 96 surrendered), and 308 units of military equipment had been seized. The United Kingdom Ministry of Defence reported on 19 May 2022 that army commander General-Lieutenant Sergey Kisel had been suspended for his failure to capture Kharkiv. His replacement was reported to be Lieutenant General Nikolai Tereshchenko, who until February had been deployed to Syria.

During the summer of 2022 they conducted attacks along a ninety-kilometer front, while also under fire from Ukrainian artillery strikes, taking significant losses. The 1st GTA and other formations were in too weakened of a state to stop the 2022 Kharkiv counteroffensive by September 2022. On 13 September 2022, UK Defence Intelligence identified 1st Guards Tank Army as the primary force that retreated from Kharkiv Oblast during the counteroffensive. Having suffered "heavy casualties", the Ministry claimed that the army as "severely degraded" and its ability to counter NATO "severely weakened". After the retreat, in the fall of 2022, the 1st GTA and the 20th Combined Arms Army were tasked with defending Svatove and Kreminna. By December, the UK MoD reported that the Army had been replenished with recruits, and was active on the Luhansk Oblast front. In early 2023 the army was withdrawn and reconstituted with mobilized personnel, and spent time in Belarus on training exercises. In March, it was deployed back to the Donbass, and reportedly replenished the losses of its T-80 and T-72 tanks with much older T-62s. The 1st GTA took part in fighting against the 2023 Ukrainian counteroffensive.

In late 2023 and early 2024, the army was reported to be fighting in the direction of Kupyansk in Kharkiv Oblast. From 2024 the 1st Guards Tank Army was assigned to the restored Moscow Military District. As of January 2025, it was participating in an envelopment of Kupyansk along with the 6th Combined Arms Army.

=== 2023 structure ===
Main source:

- 2nd Guards Motor Rifle Division (23626)
  - 1st Guards Motor Rifle Regiment (31135)
  - 15th Guards Motor Rifle Regiment (31134)
  - 1st Guards Tank Regiment (58198)
  - 136th Reconnaissance Battalion (51387)
  - 147th Self-Propelled Artillery Regiment (73966)
  - 1174th Anti-Tank Battalion (51381)
  - 1117th Anti-Aircraft Missile Regiment (51382)
- 4th Guards Tank Division (19612)
  - 12th Guards Tank Regiment (31985)
  - 13th Guards Tank Regiment (32010)
  - 423rd Motor Rifle Regiment (91701)
  - 137th Reconnaissance Battalion (54919)
  - 275th Self Propelled Artillery Regiment (73941)
  - 49th Anti-Aircraft Missile Brigade (21555)
  - 538th Guards Anti-Aircraft Missile Regiment (51383)
- 47th Tank Division (54096)
  - 26th Tank Regiment
  - 153rd Tank Regiment
  - 245th Guards Motor Rifle Regiment
  - 272nd Motor Rifle Regiment
  - 7th Reconnaissance Battalion
- 27th Motorized Rifle Brigade (61899)
- 96th Reconnaissance Brigade (52634)
- 112th Missile Brigade (03333)
- 288th Artillery Brigade (30683)

== Commanders of the Army ==
1. Katukov, Mikhail Yefimovich – Guard ColGen, 1943–1947
2. Belov, Yeftikhin Emelyanovich – Guard LtGen, 1947–1951
3. Govorunenkov, Pyotr Dmitrievich – Guard GenLt, 1951–1953
4. Yakubovsky, Ivan Ignatyevitch – Guard GenLt, 1953–1957
5. Tolubko, Vladimir Fyodorovich – Guard MajGen, 1957–1958
6. Ukhov, Vladimir Dmitrievich – Guard MajGen, 1958–1961
7. Ivanovski, Yevgeny Filippovich – Guard MajGen, 1961–1964
8. Kotsasnov, Konstantin Grigoryevich – Guard GenLt, 1964–1968
9. Gerasimov, Ivan Aleksandrovich – Guard GenLt, 1968–1971
10. Lushev, Pyotr Georgievich – Guard GenLt, 1971–1973
11. Snetkov, Boris Vasilievich – Guard LtGen, 1973–1975
12. Popov, Nikolai Ivanovich – Guard LtGen, 1975–1979
13. Sovotskin, Roman Mikhailovich – Guard LtGen, 1979–1981
14. Osipov, Vladimir Vasilyevich – Guard LtGen, 1981–1983
15. Shein, Boris Pertovich – Guard LtGen, 1983–1986
16. Tchernitsov, Anatoli Kupyanovich – Guard LtGen, 1986–1990
17. Kolchkin, Gennadi Andreevich – Guard LtGen, 1990–1992
18. Shevtsov, Leonty Pavlovich – Guard LtGen, 1992–1993
19. Sosyedov, Vasili Petrovich – Guard LtGen, 1993–1995
20. Roshchin, Viktor Mikhailovich – Guard LtGen, 1995–1999
21. Disbanded (1999–2014)
22. Aleksandr Chaiko – Guard LtGen, 2014–2017
23. Aleksey Avdeyev – Guard LtGen, 2017–2018
24. Sergey Kisel – Guard LtGen, 2018–2022
25. Nikolai Tereshchenko – Guard LtGen, 2022–2024
26. Vitaly Podlesny – Guard LtGen, 2024–present

== Sources ==
- Bonn, K.E. 'Slaughterhouse – The Handbook of the Eastern Front', Aberjona Press, 2005
- Donnelly, Ted; Ryan, Kevin; Butler, Tom; Hartman, Jeff; Gabel, Lee (March 2025). "How Russia Fights: A Compendium of Troika Observations on Russia's Special Military Operation" (PDF). United States Army Europe and Africa.
- Duncan, Andrew 'Russian Forces in Decline – Part 3', Jane's Intelligence Review, November 1996.
- V.I. Feskov, Golikov V.I., K.A. Kalashnikov, and S.A. Slugin, The Armed Forces of the USSR after World War II, from the Red Army to the Soviet (Part 1: Land Forces). (В.И. Слугин С.А. Вооруженные силы СССР после Второй Мировой войны: от Красной Армии к Советской (часть 1: Сухопутные войска)) Tomsk, 2013.
- Glantz, David M. 'Companion to Colossus Reborn' University Press of Kansas, 2005.
- Nicholson, Kate (2022-05-19). "Russia Is Firing Its Senior Commanders. What Does That Mean For The Ukraine War?". Huffington Post.
