= 49th Anti-Aircraft Missile Brigade =

- 49-я зенитная ракетная бригада
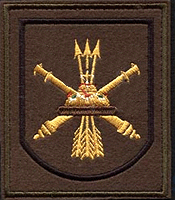
- Shoulder patch of the 49th Anti-Aircraft Missile Brigade
- Active: 1967–present
- Country: Soviet Union (1967–1991); Russia (1992–present)
- Branch: Air Defence Troops of the Russian Ground Forces
- Type: Brigade
- Role: Air Defence Troops
- Part of: 1st Guards Tank Army
- Garrison/HQ: Krasny Bor, Smolensk Oblast
- Equipment: Buk-M1-2
- Engagements: Russian invasion of Ukraine

Commanders
- Current commander: unknown

The 49th Anti-Aircraft Missile Brigade (49 zrbr) (Russian: 49-я зенитная ракетная бригада (49 зрбр), romanized: 49-ya zenitnaya raketnaya brigada (49 zrbr); Military Unit Number 21555) is a surface-to-air missile brigade of the air defense troops of the Russian Ground Forces. Part of the 1st Guards Tank Army, it is stationed in Krasny Bor, part of the city of Smolensk.

== History ==
The 49th Anti-Aircraft Missile Brigade began forming on 14 November 1967 in Luga, Leningrad Oblast, part of the Leningrad Military District and commanded by Colonel Nikolai Surikov. Its specialized personnel were drawn from other units of the district while the remainder were recent military school graduates. 19 November became celebrated as the anniversary of the brigade. The personnel of the brigade without previous missile experience were sent in echelons for retraining at the Orenburg Ground Forces Air Defense Training Center beginning on 3 January 1968. The remaining personnel began combat training at Luga. The brigade departed for the Emba Test Range on 1 June of that year to receive the 2K11 Krug surface-to-air missile system and participate in initial live fire tests. After receiving a satisfactory rating, the brigade returned to Luga for further training in October.

Transferred to Planken, East Germany between 29 January and 12 February 1969, the brigade became part of the 3rd Combined Arms Army in the Group of Soviet Forces in Germany (GSFG). After settling into its new base, the brigade began planned combat and political training on 20 March of that year. The brigade was placed on alert to defend East German airspace on 1 January 1971. The 49th was reequipped with the new Krug-M2 SAM system between 1 and 16 July 1979. After training at the Ground Forces Air Defense Training Center at Kungur between 1 April and 25 July 1987, the brigade was reequipped with the Buk missile system at the Emba Test Range from 1 August to 15 October of that year.

After the end of the Cold War, the brigade was withdrawn from Germany to Yelnya, Smolensk Oblast in 1994, and joined the 1st Guards Combined Arms Army (the former 1st Guards Tank Army). After the disbandment of the latter in 1998, the brigade came under the direct control of the Moscow Military District. From August 1998 to November 1999, personnel of the brigade served on combat duty as part of the Russian peacekeeping mission in Abkhazia during the Abkhaz–Georgian conflict. It was later reequipped with the modernized Buk-M1-2 system. The brigade was relocated to the village of Krasny Bor, Smolensk, between August and December 2012. It became part of the reformed 1st Guards Tank Army on 1 December 2014.

The brigade fought in the Russian invasion of Ukraine. Brigade commander Colonel Ivan Grishin was killed during the invasion of Ukraine on 16 April 2022.

== Commanders ==
- Colonel Nikolai Polikarpovich Surikov (1968—1971)
- Colonel Vitaliy Aleksandrovich Rabchevskiy (1971—1972)
- Colonel Vladimir Mikhailovich Kobelev (1972—1975)
- Lt. Colonel Igor Viktorovich Sitnik (1975—1979)
- Colonel Anatoliy Vasilyevich Starin (1979—1982)
- Lt. Colonel Oleg Yakovlevich Kurzov (1982—1984)
- Colonel Oleg Valentinovich Polyakov (1984—1986)
- Lt. Colonel Leonid Danilovich Popravko (1986—1990)
- Colonel Nikolai Nikolayevich Tokmakov (1990—1994)
- Colonel Nikolai Vasilyevich Tarasov (1994—1997)
- Colonel Vladimir Stepanovich Raspopin (1997—2010)
- Colonel Konstantin Andreyevich Rudenko (2010—2013)
- Colonel Ivan Ivanovich Grishin (2013—2022)
