= 1st Guards Motor Rifle Regiment =

Russian military unit

1st Guards Motorized Rifle Sevastopol Red Banner Order of Alexander Nevsky Regiment named after the 60th Anniversary of the USSR
- 1-й гвардейский мотострелковый Севастопольский Краснознамённый, ордена Александра Невского полк имени 60-летия СССР
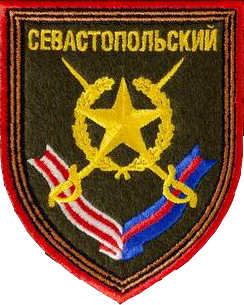
- Shoulder patch of the 1st Guards Motor Rifle Regiment
- Part of: 1st Guards Tank Army; 2nd Guards Motor Rifle Division
- Garrison/HQ: Kalininets, Moscow Oblast

The 1st Guards Motorized Rifle Sevastopol Red Banner Order of Alexander Nevsky Regiment named after the 60th Anniversary of the USSR is a tactical formation of the Russian Ground Forces. Its Military Unit Number is 31135 (military unit 31135). Abbreviated name - 1 Guards msp.

The regiment is part of the 2nd Guards Motor Rifle Division with a permanent deployment point in the town of Kalininets, Moscow Oblast.

== History ==
In January 1954, the 1st Guards Rifle Sevastopol Red Banner, Order of Alexander Nevsky Regiment, on the basis of the directive of the commander of the Moscow Military District dated December 30, 1953, was reorganized and renamed with the preservation of previously assigned distinctions and names to the 73rd Guards Mechanized Regiment (military unit 61896) 23rd Guards Mechanized Division (2nd formation).

On June 5, 1957, the 73rd Guards Mechanized Regiment, by directive of the commander of the Moscow Military District of March 26, 1957, was transformed into the 73rd Guards Motorized Rifle Regiment of the 23rd Guards Motor Rifle Division. By order of the Minister of Defense of the USSR No. 00147 dated November 17, 1964, in order to preserve military traditions, the 23rd Guards Motorized Rifle Division was renamed the 2nd Guards Motor Rifle Division.

By order of the USSR Ministry of Defense No. 0229 dated December 17, 1982, for excellent performance in exercises, the regiment was named “60th Anniversary of the USSR.”

In 1985, the regiment was awarded the pennant of the Minister of Defence of the Soviet Union "For courage and military prowess."

In May 1990, the 73rd Guards Motorized Rifle Regiment was returned to its Second World War numbering, "1", and thus became the 1st Guards Motor Rifle Regiment.

With the rest of the 2nd Guards Motor Rifle Division, the regiment was involved in the initial Russian invasion of Ukraine. There it is reported to have lost its commanding officer, Lieutenant Colonel Denis Mezhuyev. Ukrainian prosecutors accused a member of the regiment of robbing civilians in the village of Zhyhailivka, Sumy Oblast.
