= Air Defence Troops of the Russian Ground Forces =

Combat Arm of the Russian Ground Forces for air defence

- Russian: Войска ПВО Сухопутных войск Российской Федерации
- Emblem of the Air Defence Troops of the Russian Ground Forces
- Active: 1915
- Country: Russia
- Branch: Russian Ground Forces
- Type: Combat Arm
- Role: Anti-Aircraft Warfare
- Engagements: Russo-Georgian War; Russian military intervention in the Syrian civil war; 2022 Russian invasion of Ukraine

Commanders
- Current commander: Lieutenant general Alexander Leonov

Insignia
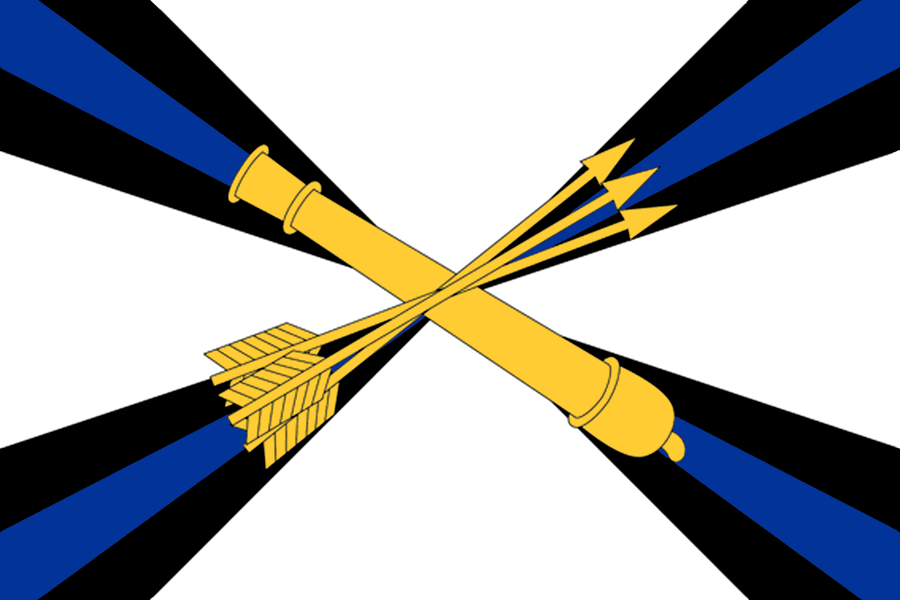
- Flag

The Air Defence Troops (Russian: Войска ПВО Сухопутных войск Российской Федерации, romanized: Voyska PVO Sukhoputnykh voysk Rossiyskoy Federatsii) are a Combat Arm of the Russian Ground Forces, intended to cover troops and facilities from means of air attack of the enemy during conduct by combined-arms associations and formations of operations (combat actions), regroupings (marches) and being on-site. They are assigned to fulfil the following main tasks:

- combat duty on air defence;
- reconnaissance of enemy aircraft and warning the troops covered;
- destruction of enemy air attack means during their flight;
- participation in conduct of missile defence in theatres of military actions.

Organisationally the Air Defence Troops of the GF consist of military control bodies, AD command points, anti-aircraft missile (rocket-artillery) and radio-technical formations, military units and subdivisions. They are capable of destroying enemy means of air attack throughout the range of heights (extremely small – up to 200 m, small – from 200 to 1000 m, average – from 1000 to 4000 m, large – from 4000 to 12000 m, and in the stratosphere – more than 12000 m) and flight speeds.

Formations, military units and subdivisions of the Air Defence Troops of the GF are equipped with anti-aircraft missiles, anti-aircraft artillery, anti-aircraft gun-and-missile systems and portable anti-aircraft missile systems different on the reach-ability, channel-ability and means of missile guidance. Depending on the range of destruction of aerial targets, they are divided into the systems of near range – up to 10 km, of short range – up to 30 km, of medium range – up to 100 km, of long range – of more than 100 km.

Further development of the Air Defence Troops of the GF is carried out by improving mobility, survivability, covertness of operation, automation's degree, fire efficiency, expanding parameters of the affected area, reducing the response time and the mass-dimensional characteristics of the guided missile (rocket-artillery) systems.

It was reported in January 2021 that the Air Defence Troops of the Ground Forces received over 900 units of military equipment - long-range anti-aircraft missile systems S-300V4, short-range and medium-range anti-aircraft missile systems "Tor-M2" and "Buk-M3", portable anti-aircraft missile systems "Verba".
