= 288th Guards Artillery Brigade =

- 288-я гвардейская артиллерийская бригада
- Founded: 11 December 1942
- Country: Russia
- Branch: Russian Ground Forces
- Type: Brigade
- Role: Artillery
- Part of: 1st Guards Tank Army
- Garrison/HQ: Mulino, Nizhny Novgorod Oblast
- Nickname: Warsaw
- Decorations: Order of Kutuzov

The 288th Guards Artillery Brigade (Russian: 288-я гвардейская артиллерийская бригада) (MUN 30683) is a tactical formation of the Ground Forces of the Russian Armed Forces. The brigade is stationed in the village of Mulino in the Nizhny Novgorod Oblast. The formation is part of the 1st Guards Tank Army.

== History ==
During the Great Patriotic War, the formation was designated as the 10th Cannon Artillery Brigade. It was formed on 11 December 1942, 8 kilometers northwest of Kaluga. It took part in the Operation Kutuzov as part of the 11th Guards Army north of Oryol in 1943. Later, it participated in the defeat of the Wehrmacht in Operation Bagration on the territory of the BSSR. The cities of Kalinkovichi and Mozyr were liberated. For the liberation of Warsaw during the Warsaw-Poznan Offensive Operation, the honorary title "Warsaw" was awarded. In 1945, as part of the 1st Belorussian Front, the 10th Cannon Artillery Brigade participated in the Brandenburg-Rathen Operation. The cities of Brandenburg an der Havel, Potsdam and Berlin were captured.

During the war, the total number of people awarded orders and medals was 6,031. The commander of the 152-mm gun-howitzer battery of the 486th Cannon Artillery Regiment of the 10th Cannon Artillery Brigade, Senior Lieutenant Konstantin Molonenkov, and the commander of the 207th Cannon Artillery Regiment Vladimir Morozov became Heroes of the Soviet Union.

During the Cold War, as the 288th Heavy Howitzer Artillery Brigade, it was stationed in Chemnitz, East Germany (288th Heavy Howitzer Brigade, military unit 50618) as part of the 34th Guards Artillery Division of the Group of Soviet Forces in Germany. Until the summer of 1988, the brigade's main armament was the 152 mm howitzer 2A65 Msta-B. In 1988, the brigade was re-equipped with 152 mm 2A65 Msta-B towed howitzers. By the time of its withdrawal from East Germany to Russia, the brigade consisted of three artillery battalions, three batteries and a command platoon in each battalion, as well as a command battery, an artillery reconnaissance battery, a logistics company, a repair company, a chemical and radiation reconnaissance platoon, and an engineer platoon. At the time of its withdrawal from Germany, the brigade consisted of 72 units. 152 mm howitzer 2A65 Msta-B, 4 PRP-3, 12 1V18, 4 1V19, 1 R-145BM.

On 19 February 2024, the brigade was awarded the "Guards" honorary title for mass heroism and bravery, fortitude and courage demonstrated by the brigade personnel in combat operations to defend the Fatherland and state interests in armed conflicts.
