= Chertkov =

Chertkov, Chertkoff or Tchertkoff (Russian: Чертков) is a Russian masculine originating from the word chort, meaning devil, demon. Its feminine counterpart is Chertkova. The surname may refer to the following notable people:

- Anatoly Chertkov (1936–2014), Russian football midfielder
- Fenia Chertkoff (1869–1927), Russian-born Argentine feminist, educator, political activist and sculptor
- Vladimir Chertkov (1854–1936), Russian editor of the works of Leo Tolstoy
- Wladimir Tchertkoff, Italian journalist
