= Sergey Kisel =

Russian Ground Forces officer (born 1971)

Lieutenant General Sergey Kisel
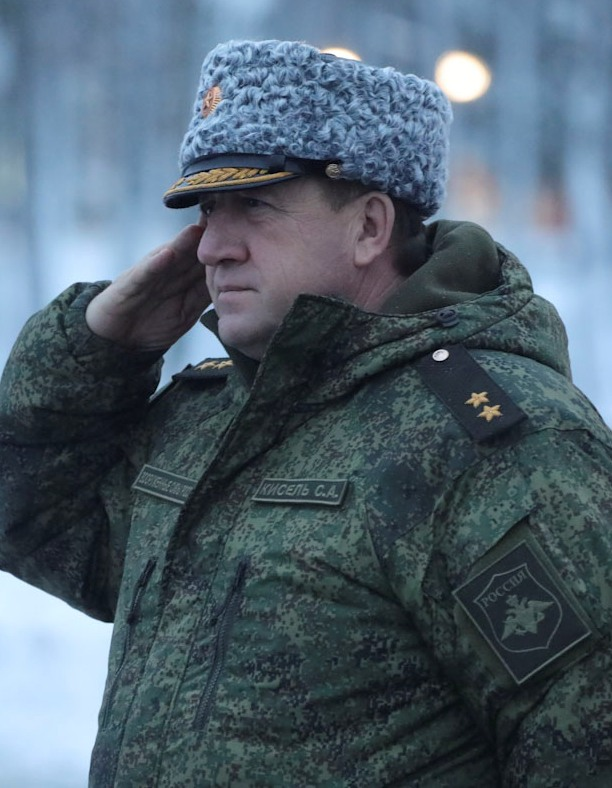
- Kisel in 2020
- Native name: Сергей Александрович Кисель
- Born: 27 March 1971 (age 55)
- Allegiance: Russia
- Branch: Russian Ground Forces
- Service years: 1990–present
- Commands: 1st Guards Tank Army; Russian Operational Group in Syria
- Conflicts: Russo-Ukrainian War; Syrian Civil War

Sergey Aleksandrovich Kisel (Russian: Сергей Александрович Кисель, born 27 March 1971) is a Russian Ground Forces officer who commanded the Russian Armed Forces Operational Group in Syria from 2023 to 2024.

Previously, he was the commander of the 1st Guards Tank Army from 2018 to 2022, and was relieved of command after the failure to capture Kharkov at the start of the Russian invasion of Ukraine. Kisel was sent to Syria in May 2022, and was appointed commander of the Russian Operational Group in Syria in November 2023, replacing Colonel General Andrey Serdyukov.

== Biography ==
Kisel was born in 1971 and is a graduate of the Tashkent Higher Tank Command School, the Combined Arms Academy of the Armed Forces of the Russian Federation, and the General Staff Academy. He held commands at levels from a platoon to a motor rifle brigade. In the early 2010s he commanded the 19th Separate Motor Rifle Brigade of the 58th Army, stationed in North Ossetia, before being appointed the chief of staff and first deputy commander of the 20th Army in September 2016.

In April 2018 he was appointed commander of the 1st Guards Tank Army.

During the early Russian invasion of Ukraine Kisel was relieved of command, and was sent to Syria in May 2022. He became commander of the Operational Group of the Russian Armed Forces in Syria in November 2023.

There were reports by Russian military bloggers in early December 2024 that he was relieved of command of forces in Syria after the fall of Aleppo to Syrian opposition forces, and replaced by Colonel General Aleksandr Chaiko, though the Russian Ministry of Defense has not publicly commented on the matter.

== Awards ==
- Order "For Merit to the Fatherland", 4th class with swords
- Order of Courage
- Order of Military Merit

Military offices
Preceded by Denis Davydov	Commander of the 19th Separate Motor Rifle Brigade; 2010–2014	Succeeded by Esedulla Abachev
Preceded by Alexei Avdeyev	Commander of the 1st Guards Tank Army; 2018–2022	Succeeded by Nikolai Tereshchenko
Preceded by Andrey Serdyukov	Commander of the Operational Group of the Russian Armed Forces in Syria; 2023–2024	Succeeded by Aleksandr Chaiko
