= 96th Reconnaissance Brigade =

Russian Ground Forces formation

- 96-я отдельная Нижегородская бригада разведки
- Active: 2015–present
- Country: Russia
- Branch: Russian Ground Forces
- Part of: Moscow Military District; 1st Guards Tank Army
- Garrison/HQ: Sormovo, Nizhny Novgorod Oblast

Commanders
- Current commander: Colonel Yevgeny A. Chintsov

The 96th "Nizhny Novgorod" Reconnaissance Brigade (Russian: 96-я отдельная Нижегородская бригада разведки) is a military formation of the Russian Ground Forces, part of the 1st Guards Tank Army.

The unit is garrisoned in Sormovo, Nizhny Novgorod Oblast and has the Military Unit Number 52634.

== History ==
The official date of formation for the unit is 26 December 2015 where Lieutenant Colonel Alexey Talalayev was named the commander of the brigade.

It is known that the brigade was deployed to Syria and participated in the Battle of Palmyra in March 2016 where at least one soldier of the unit died.

During the Russian invasion of Ukraine, the brigade was part of the first units to enter Ukraine, as part of its parent unit, the 1st Guards Tank Army. There was footage of abandoned Typhoon-Ks and Iveco LMVs with the markings of the 96th Reconnaissance Brigade. Soldiers and officers of the unit were also captured by Ukrainian forces.

In March 2022, the Ukrainian military claimed to have defeated units of the 96th Reconnaissance Brigade during combat at Okhtyrka and Trostianets in the Sumy Oblast.

The Main Directorate of Intelligence of Ukraine lists Colonel Yevgeny A. Chintsov as the current commander with Lieutenant Colonel Nikolai A. Kiselev as his deputy as of April 2022.

== Commanders ==
Commanders of the 96th Reconnaissance Brigade
No.	Name	From	To
1	Lieutenant Colonel Alexey Talalayev	26 December 2015	?
2	Colonel Yevgeny A. Chintsov	?	present
