= 15th Guards Motor Rifle Regiment =

15th Guards Motorized Rifle Shavlinsky Order of Lenin, Red Banner Regiment
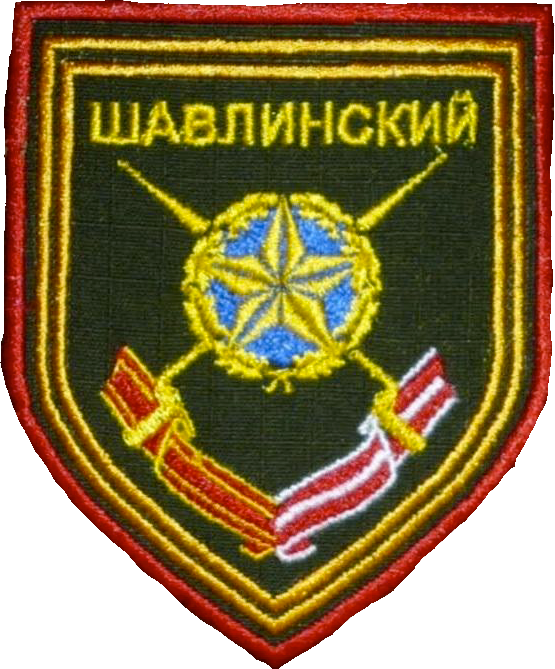
- Shoulder patch of the 15th Guards Motor Rifle Regiment
- Active: 1990-present
- Garrison/HQ: Kalininets, Moscow Oblast

Commanders
- Current commander: Colonel Kharitonov

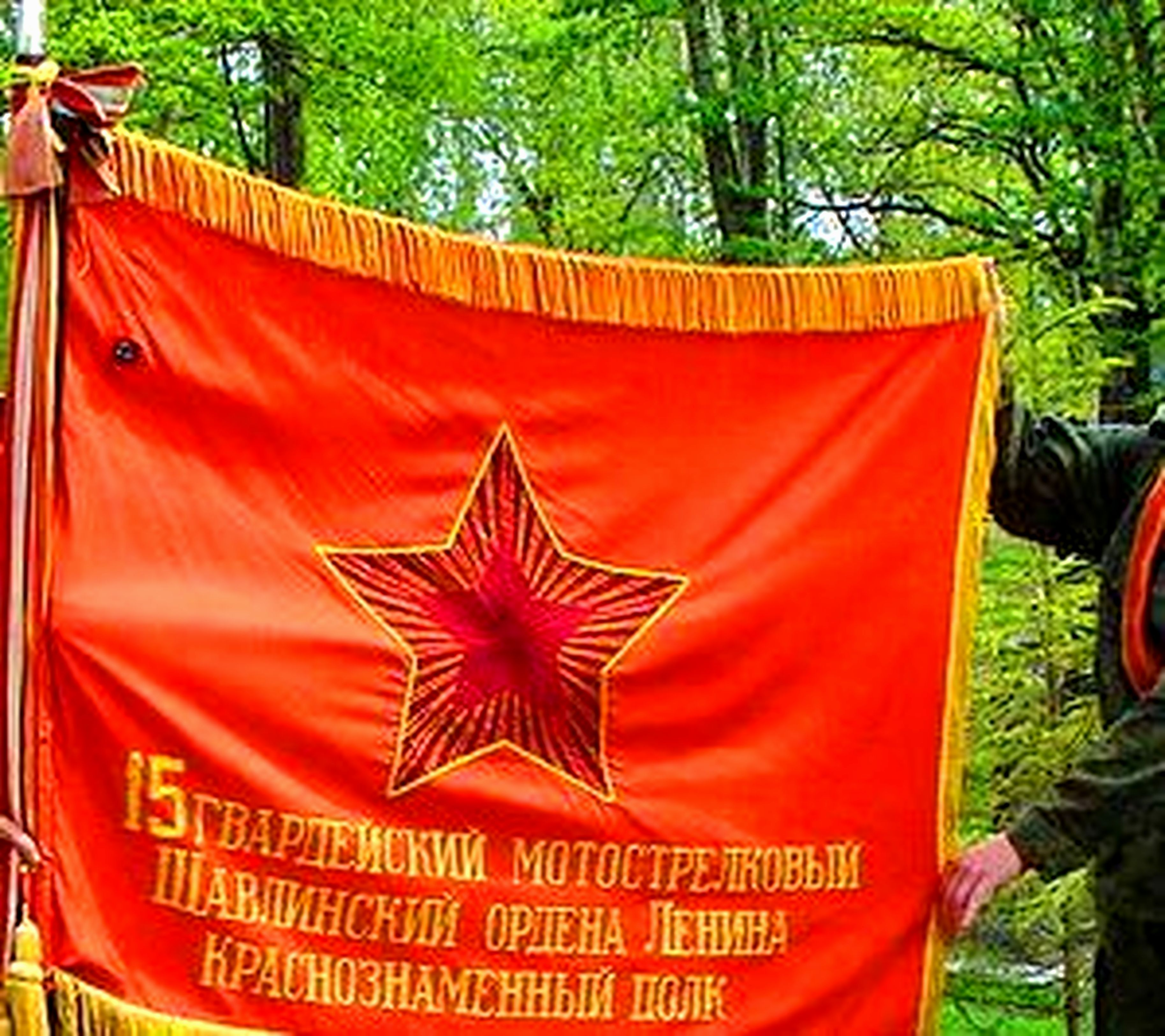
Banner of the regiment

The 15th Guards Motorized Rifle Shavlinsky Order of Lenin, Red Banner Regiment (15 Guards MSP), (Russian: 15-й гвардейский мотострелковый Шавлинский ордена Ленина, Краснознамённый полк, romanized: 15-y gvardeyskiy motostrelkovyy Shavlinskiy ordena Lenina, Krasnoznamonnyy polk) is a motor rifle regiment of the Russian Ground Forces of the Armed Forces of the Russian Federation. Its Military Unit Number is 31134. It is based in Kalininets (Moscow Oblast). It is part of the 2nd Guards Motor Rifle Division of the Moscow Military District.

Over the entire history of the regiment, more than 600 personnel have been awarded orders and medals, of which more than 250 - Order of Courage.

== History ==
The regiment was created in 1918.

=== World War II ===
By the beginning of the war, it was called the 875th Infantry Regiment of the 127th Rifle Division (1st Formation). The regiment fought in the Eastern front battles of Smolensk and Kursk, as well as the Novorossiysk-Taman operation. The regiment took part in the occupation of Ukraine and Lithuania. For its wartime actions, the regiment was raised to "Guards" status as the 15th Guards Rifle Regiment. For the occupation of the Lithuanian city of Šiauliai during the Šiauliai offensive the regiment received the honorary title "Shavlinsky."

=== Cold War ===
In 1953, the 15th Guards Rifle Regiment was reorganized into the 130th Guards Mechanised Regiment (military unit 73881) of the 23rd Guards Mechanised Division. In 1957, the regiment became the 406th Guards Motor Rifle Regiment, with the creation of motor rifle units and formations.

On 4 May 1990 the regiment reverted to its Second World War number as the 15th Guards Motor Rifle Regiment.

=== Post–Cold War era ===
On May 15, 2009, during a military reorganisation, the regiment was disbanded. The regiment was revived in 2013 as part of the 2nd Guards Motor Rifle Division.

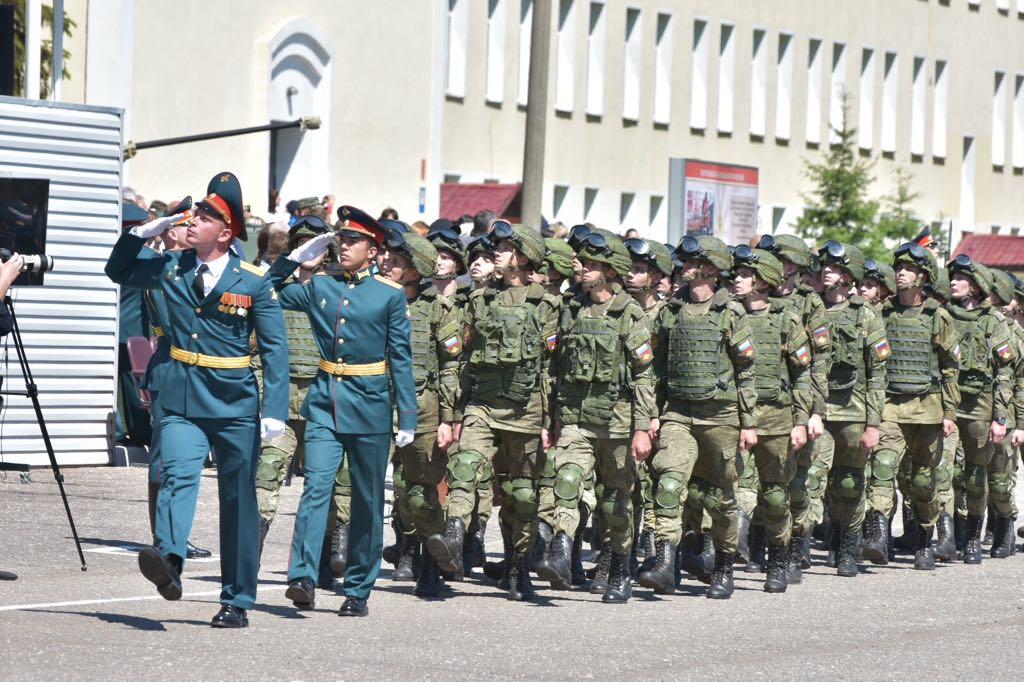
110th Anniversary celebrations of the regiment

On 10 March 2022, a member of the regiment was taken prisoner by Ukrainian forces in the Sumy Oblast. On 28 March, the Ukrainian military claimed that soldiers of the regiment had refused to participate in hostilities in the Sumy Oblast. In April 2022, it was reported that the regimental commander Colonel Kharitonov was seriously wounded in the Kharkiv Oblast.
