= Kruhliakivka =

Kruhliakivka Кругляківка
- Village
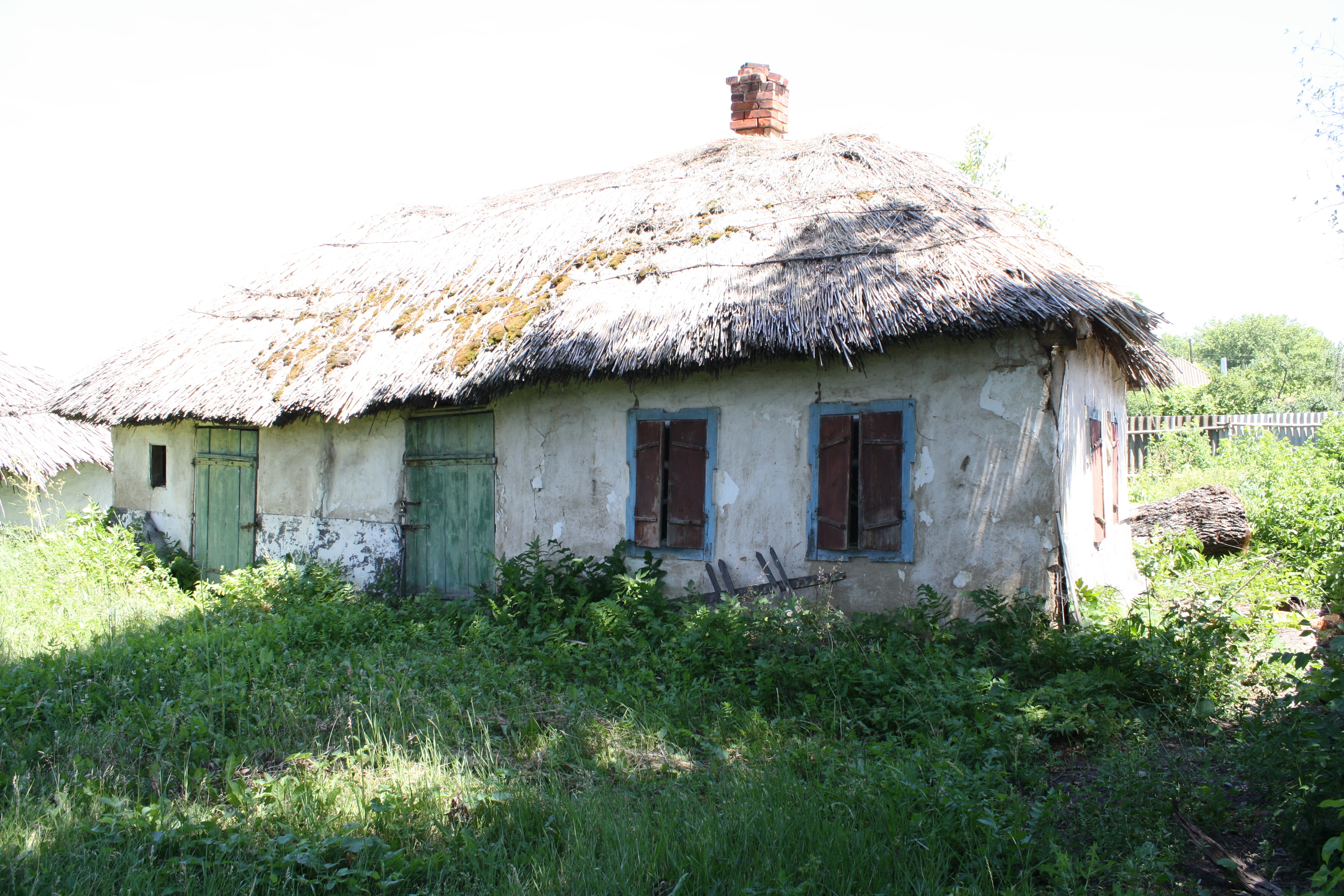
- 19th century home in Kruhliakivka

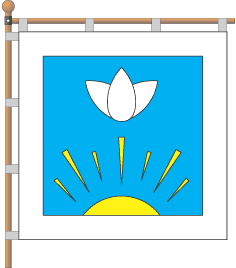
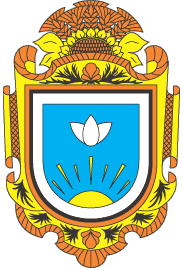
- Flag Coat of arms
- Interactive map of Kruhliakivka
- Location within Kharkiv Oblast Location within Ukraine
- Coordinates: 49°31′44″N 37°43′02″E
- Country: Ukraine
- Oblast: Kharkiv Oblast
- Raion: Kupiansk Raion
- Hromada: Kurylivka rural hromada
- Founded: 1780

Area
  - Total: 2.68 km^{2} (1.03 sq mi)
- Elevation: 79 m (259 ft)

Population (2001 census)
  - Total: 1,173
  - Density: 438/km^{2} (1,130/sq mi)
- Time zone: UTC+2 (EET)
  - Summer (DST): UTC+3 (EEST)
- Postal code: 63753
- Area code: +380 5742
- KOATUU code: 6323783201

Kruhliakivka (Ukrainian: Кругляківка, Russian: Кругляковка) is a village in Ukraine, located in the Kupiansk Raion in the Kharkiv Oblast. It is part of the Kurylivka rural hromada, one of the hromadas of Ukraine.

== History ==
In April 2022, Ukrainian forces captured the village from Russian control.

In August 2023, Russian forces reportedly struck private houses in the village with guided aerial bombs, killing at least two civilians and injuring five others.

On 18 October 2024, Ukrainian forces claimed to have pushed Russian forces out of the village. Russian forces advanced in the southwestern part of the village around 19 October. On 30 October, the Russian army claimed to have recaptured the village. It was confirmed by ISW.

== Transportation ==
Kruhliakivka is located on two roads leading towards Kupiansk. One road (O-211942) leads along the eastern bank of the Oskil and the second road (P-79) leads with a bridge over the Oskil to the village of Sen'kove. According to the OpenData map service OpenStreetMap, the bridge over the Oskil has been destroyed.
