= Borzoy =

Rural locality in the Chechen Republic, Russia

Coordinates: 42°51′N 45°38′E

Borzoy population
- 2010 Census: 4,063
- 2002 Census: 4,209

Borzoy (Russian: Борзо́й; Chechen: Борзе, Borze) is a rural locality (a selo) in Shatoysky District of the Chechen Republic, Russia, located on the left bank of the Argun River. As of the 2010 Census, its population was 4,063.

In 1944, after the forced deportation of the Chechen and Ingush populations, Borzoy was renamed Alpiyskoye (Альпийское) and settled by migrants from neighboring Dagestan. When the Chechen-Ingush Autonomous Soviet Socialist Republic was reinstated in 1957, the migrants were moved back to Dagestan and the old name was restored.

== History ==
Borzoi has a history rooted in the Chechen greyhound, or "barrow," which is reflected in its name. The population of Borzoi is made up of descendants of various Chechen societies, including Tumsoy, Merzhoy, Chinkhoy, Keloy, Shiroy, and Khildehara.

In 1944, the village of Borzoi was renamed Alpiyskoye and settled by people from neighboring Dagestan, following the deportation of the Chechens and Ingush and the abolition of the Chechen-Ingush Autonomous Soviet Socialist Republic. The original name, Borzoi, was restored to the settlement after the restoration of the Chechen-Ingush Autonomous Soviet Socialist Republic, and the Dagestanis were resettled back to Dagestan.

In the vicinity of Borzoi, there is a military camp of the 291st Guards Motorized Rifle Regiment.

== Geography ==
Borzoi is located on the left bank of the Argun River, 6 km southwest of the district center of Shatoy. It borders several other settlements including Vysokogornoye to the north, Guchum-Kale to the south, Ryadukhoy and Vashindara to the northeast, Tumsoy to the south and Kharsenoy to the northwest. The village is situated in a strategic location, with a nearby military camp of the 291st Guards Motorized Rifle Regiment.
