= Miss Russian Army =

Beauty contest held by the Russian Ground Forces

Miss Russian Army (Russian: Мисс Российская армия, romanized: Miss Rossiyskaya armiya) is a beauty contest held by the Russian Ground Forces in which female soldiers compete for a title of the same name. It is admittedly staged for the purposes of increasing interest in and recruitment for the army among young men.

In June 2005, nineteen female soldiers and sailors participated in the competition (entitled "Beauties in Shoulder Straps"), which was broadcast on live television. The event, held at the Russian Army Theatre in Moscow, included the soldiers walking down the catwalk in uniform and singing songs while accompanied by guitarists (a memorable lyric included the phrases, "Since we're soldiers, our first concern is automatic weapons; boys come second"). A children's choir sang a song called "Our Army Is the Strongest". Other events, shown on film, saw the contestants competing in drills, crawling in combat uniform, entering tanks, and running with automatic weapons. (Defense officials prohibited the wearing of bikinis.) Other film clips showed women in the ranks of the earlier Red and Soviet Armies and their role in Soviet-era wars.

Officials were quite open about the hoped-for propaganda and recruiting value of the contest. Colonel Gennady Dzyuba, a Defense Ministry official, said, "Those who have served, especially in hot spots, know the importance of women — they calm the team down. We restrain ourselves in front of them, desist from coarseness." A former Miss Army said that because of the falling prestige of the Russian Army, such a high-visibility contest makes men "want to join".
