= Kalininets =

Kalininets Кали́нинец
- Town
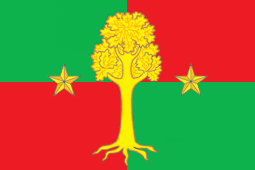
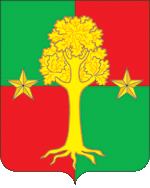
- Flag Coat of arms
- Interactive map of Kalininets
- Location of Kalininets Kalininets (Moscow Oblast)
- Coordinates: 55.55846855°N 36.974891°E
- Country: Russia
- Federal subject: Moscow Oblast
- Administrative district: Naro-Fominsky District
- TownSelsoviet: Kalininets
- Founded: 2006
- Town status since: 2006

Government
  - Head: Mikhail Valerievich Trubkin (2013)

Population (2010 Census)
  - Total: 21,774
  - Estimate (2025): 25,545 (+17.3%)

Administrative status
  - Capital of: Naro-Fominsky District, Town of Kalininets

Municipal status
  - Municipal district: Kalininetsy Municipal District
  - Urban settlement: Kalininets Urban Settlement
  - Capital of: Petrovsky Municipal District, Kalininets Urban Settlement
- Time zone: UTC+3 (MSK)
- Postal code: 143370
- Dialing code: +7 8-496
- OKTMO ID: 46638155051

Kalininets (Russian: Кали́нинец) is an urban locality (a work settlement) in the Naro-Fominsky District in Moscow Oblast, Russia. The town's name is a derivative form of an unofficial name for a soldier of the Taman Division, which is in turn named after Mikhail Ivanovich Kalinin (Russian: Михаи́л Ива́нович Кали́нин).

== Location ==
Kalininets is along the Desna River which is a tributary of the Pakhra River. It is 34 kilometers (21 mi) southwest of Moscow and 25 kilometers (16 mi) northeast of Naro-Fominsk on the Little Moscow Ring (Russian: Малом Московском кольце) route A-107 between the Kiev and Minsk highways.

== Population, administrative and municipal status ==
Population: 21,774 (2010 census); 23,873 (2002 census); 9,304 (1979 Census)

As an administrative division, Kalininets was raised from a rural locality to the Work Settlement of Kalininets on July 11, 2006. Kalininets is the most populous settlement of the urban settlement Kalininets, which includes the villages of Petrovskoye, Burtsevo, Novosusino, Selyatino, Sumino, Taraskovo, and Yushkovo.

Nearby Selyatino in the municipal entity of Selyatino provides local bus service. Selyatino has a hospital. Local Bus #55 provides service between the Hospital and nearby Aprelevka train station. Golitsyno has a hospital, too.

== Transportation ==
=== Railway ===
- Nearest railway stations or platform on the Moscow–Bryansk (Kiev, Ukraine) railway:
  - Alabino (Russian: Алабино), Selyatino (Russian: Селя́тино), and Aprelevka (Russian: Апре́левка)
  - From the south side of Selyatino train station, a local bus leaves for Kalininets with stops in Kalininets at the enlisted barracks KECh (Russian: КЭЧ or Квартирно-Эксплутационная Часть) along Ulitsa Fabrichnoi (Russian: улицей Фабричной), which has a laundry for the Army, often called Posyolok Milni or Solemn settlement (Russian: Посёлок Мыльный), and a stop at the officers houses (Russian: ДОС or Дома офицерского состава) in Taraskovo (Тарасково) which is near the highway in Kalininets.
  - From the north side of Selyatino train station or from north of the Alabino platform, a local bus for Kalininets has a stop in Alabino at Ulitsa Fabrichnoi (Russian: улицей Фабричной) and the Little Moscow Ring (Russian: Малом Московском кольце) route A-107.
  - From the south side of Aprelevka train station, local bus #55 leaves for Selyatino (Hospital). The Selyatino local bus terminal has local bus #60 (1190) Selyatino to Golitsyno with stops at Kalininets.
- Nearest railway station or platform on the Moscow–Smolensk (Minsk, Belarus; Warsaw, Poland; Berlin, Germany; Paris, France) railway:
  - Golitsyno (Russian: Голи́цыно), and Malaya Vyzyomy (Russian: Ма́лая Вязёма or Ма́лые Вязёмы)
  - From the south side of Golitsyno train station, a local bus #60 (1190) leaves from Golitsyno for Selyatino with a stop at the officers houses (Russian: ДОС or Дома офицерского состава) in Taraskovo (Тарасково) which is near the highway in Kalininets. There is no stop at the enlisted barracks KECh (Russian: КЭЧ or Квартирно-Эксплутационная Часть) in Kalininets. To get the enlisted barracks KECh (Russian: КЭЧ or Квартирно-Эксплутационная Часть) in Kalininets, you must walk along Ulitsa Fabrichnoi (Russian: улицей Фабричной), which has a laundry for the Army, often called Posyolok Milni or Solemn settlement (Russian: Посёлок Мыльный).

=== Long distance Highway Coaches ===
Bus #39 (Russian: маршрут No.39) from Kievskaya train station (Russian: Киевского вокзала), Odintsovo station (Russian: станции Одинцово), in Moscow provides service to nearby Golitsyno. From Golitysno, local bus #60 Selyatino to Golitsyno travels along the Little Moscow Ring (Russian: Малом Московском кольце) route A-107 and has stops in Kalininets.

=== Highway ===
Along the Little Moscow Ring (Russian: Малом Московском кольце) route A-107, (Note: Because it was 23 nautical miles or 35-50 kilometers from the Kremlin, the Little Moscow Ring (Russian: Малом Московском кольце) is also known as the Little Betonka (Russian: «Малая бетонка»), the First Betonka (Russian: «Первая Бетонка»); the Pyatidesyatikilometrovka (Russian: «Пятидесятикилометровка»); or the Golden Ring of Air Defense (Russian: Золотое кольцо ПВО).) Kalininets is 9 kilometers (5.6 mi) northeast of Selyatino (Russian: Селятино) and 5 kilometers (3.1 mi) south of the Golitsyno (Russian: Голи́цыно).

- Kiev highway (Russian: Киевское шоссе): At the intersection of Little Moscow Ring (Russian: Малом Московском кольце) route A-107 and M 3 E101, Kalininets is 8 kilometers (5.0 mi) northeast of the Selyatino (Russian: Селя́тино) exit from M 3 E101 Moscow-Kiev, Kiev highway (Russian: Киевское шоссе).
- Minsk highway (Russian: Минское шоссе): At the intersection of Little Moscow Ring (Russian: Малом Московском кольце) route A-107 and M 1 E30, Kalininets is 5 kilometers (3.1 mi) south of the Golitsyno (Russian: Голи́цыно) exit from M 1 E30 Moscow-Minsk, Minsk highway (Russian: Минское шоссе).

== Military ==
The town is home to several units of the 2nd Guards 'Taman' Motor Rifle Division in the Western Military District.
