= List of tank brigades of the Red Army =

This page lists tank brigades of the Red Army during World War II. The tank brigade occupied an intermediate position between a tank regiment and tank divisions of the Red Army.

A tank brigade can be separate, that is, formally not part of corps and Field army - in this case, the name of the brigade can have the adjective “separate” added.

For courage, heroism of the personnel, and military merits during World War II, a total of sixty-eight brigades received the honorary title - "Guards"; 112 were awarded honorary names, 114 were awarded orders, and 34 of them deserved six or more awards and distinctions. The brigades that received five and six orders included the 1st, 44th, 47th, 50th, 52nd, the 65th and the 68th Guards Tank Brigade.

After the end of the war, the remaining tank brigades were reorganized as tank regiments.

The Russian Tank Troops are the main descendant of these formations in the early twenty-first century.

== Tank brigades formed in 1938–1940 ==
- 1st Light Tank Brigade
- 13th Light Tank Brigade

== Tank Brigades formed 1941–1945 ==
- Tank Brigade of the North Caucasus Front (Maykop Tank Brigade) – Formed from officer trainees of the Oryol Tank School by 24 July 1942, suffered heavy losses and remnants returned to the Oryol Tank School by 30 August 1942
- 1st Tank Brigade – Formed from 32nd and 34th Tank Divisions by 18 September 1941, converted to 6th Guards Tank Brigade 16 February 1942.
- 1st Warsaw Armoured Brigade ("1st Polish Tank Brigade") 1st Polish Army/1st Belorussian Front
- 1st Leningrad Tank Brigade, redesignated from 123rd Tank Brigade 1942, reorganized as 207th Self-Propelled Artillery Brigade 8 December 1944 /Leningrad Front
- 2nd Tank Brigade – Formed by 20 September 1941, Reorganized as 71st Tank Regiment after 15 February 1943
- 3rd Tank Brigade – Formed from 37th Tank Division by 6 September 1941
- 4th Tank Brigade – Formed by 4 October 1941, converted to 1st Guards Tank Brigade 11 November 1941
- 5th Tank Brigade – Formed from 12th Tank Regiment of the 1st Tank Division by 28 September 1941, converted to 6th Guards Tank Brigade 5 March 1942
- 6th Tank Brigade – Formed by 16 July 1942, Broken up to form 19th Guards Tank Regiment and 73rd Tank Regiment 12 October 1942
- 6th Tank Brigade "A" – Formed by 23 October 1941, Redesignated 57th Tank Brigade after 2 May 1942
- 7th Tank Brigade – Formed September 1941, Destroyed during Second Battle of Kharkov, disbanded on paper 15 May 1942
- 8th Tank Brigade – Formed from 32nd Tank Division September 1941, converted to 3rd Guards Tank Brigade 11 January 1942
- 9th Tank Brigade – Formed by 27 September 1941, converted to 2nd Guards Tank Brigade 5 January 1942
- 10th Tank Brigade – Formed by 17 September 1941 from 43rd Tank Division, reorganized as 74th Tank Regiment after 25 December 1942
- 11th Tank Brigade – Formed by 3 October 1941
- 12th Tank Brigade – Formed by 9 September 1941, broken up to form 50th and 51st Tank Regiments after 9 November 1942
- 13th Tank Brigade – Formed by 28 September 1941, converted to 32nd Guards Tank Brigade 7 February 1943
- 14th Tank Brigade – Formed by 28 September 1941, reorganized as 87th Tank Regiment after 4 March 1943
- 15th Tank Brigade – Formed by 22 September 1941, reorganized as 8th Self-Propelled Artillery Brigade after 27 February 1943
- 16th Tank Brigade – Formed by 21 September 1941 from 34th Tank Division /Belorussian-Latvian Military District - in January 1942, with 54th Army (Soviet Union), Leningrad Front
- 17th Tank Brigade – Formed by 7 October 1941 from 48th Tank Division, converted to 9th Guards Tank Brigade 17 November 1942
- 18th Tank Brigade – Formed by 11 October 1941 from 48th Tank Brigade, converted to 42nd Guards Tank Brigade 10 April 1943
- 19th Tank Brigade – Formed by 11 October 1941, converted to 16th Guards Tank Brigade 8 December 1942
- 20th Tank Brigade – Formed by 11 October 1941
- 21st Tank Brigade – Formed by 13 October 1941, reorganized as 12th Guards Tank Regiment after 3 November 1942
- 22nd Tank Brigade – Formed by 12 October 1941, converted to 40th Guards Tank Brigade 23 October 1943
- 23rd Tank Brigade – Formed by 21 October 1941
- 24th Tank Brigade – Began formation 6 October 1941 using personnel and equipment of 146th Tank Brigade (I), entered active army 21 October 1941
- 25th Tank Brigade – Entered active army 21 October 1941, temporarily redesignated 25th Heavy Self-Propelled Artillery Brigade from 8 to 13 January 1945
- 26th Tank Brigade – Entered active army 26 October 1941, converted to 58th Guards Tank Brigade 19 September 1943
- 27th Tank Brigade – Entered active army 26 October 1941, reorganized as 18th Tank Regiment after 12 October 1942
- 28th Tank Brigade – Entered active army 24 October 1941, converted to 28th Guards Tank Brigade 7 February 1943
- 29th Tank Brigade – Entered active army 13 April 1942, converted to 67th Guards Tank Brigade 12 February 1945.
- 33rd Tank Brigade/36th Army/Trans-Baikal Military District
- 35th Tank Brigade/36th Army/Trans-Baikal Military District
- 43rd Tank Brigade/17th Army/Trans-Baikal Military District
- 44th Tank Brigade, Transbaikal Military District
- 53rd Tank Brigade, with 11th Tank Corps of 5th Tank Army, 28 June 1942.
- 54th Tank Brigade, in April 1942 part of 12th Army (Soviet Union) (which see)
- 66th Tank Brigade – Formed 1942 with 17th Tank Corps, converted to Guards as 12th Guards Tank Brigade 2 January 1943 when 17th Tank Corps became 4th Guards Tank Corps
- 67th Tank Brigade – Formed 1942 with 17th Tank Corps, converted to Guards as 13th Guards Tank Brigade 2 January 1943 when 17th Tank Corps became 4th Guards Tank Corps
- 68th Tank Brigade, 69th Army, 1st Belorussian Front
- 72nd Tank Brigade/25th Army/Far Eastern Front
- 73rd Tank Brigade/2nd Army/Far Eastern Front
- 74th Tank Brigade/2nd Army/Far Eastern Front
- 75th Tank Brigade/1st Army/Far Eastern Front
- 76th Tank Brigade/25th Army/Far Eastern Front
- 77th Tank Brigade/1st Army/Far Eastern Front
- 78th Tank Brigade/10th Guards Army/2nd Baltic Front - originally formed between 17 January - 14 February 1942 in the Moscow Military District. Became 78th Heavy Tank Self-Propelled Regiment, then 15th Tank Division in 1949, then the 78th Tank Division.
- 80th Tank Brigade - NKO Directive No. 723190ss of January 21, 1942, ordered the establishment of 80th Tank Brigade of the 20th Tank Corps at Sormovo, Gorky Oblast. It fought among the ranks of the Active Army for five periods from April 1942 to 1945. Became 80th Tank Regiment of 38th GTD, then 90th Guards Tank Division. Now ru:80-й гвардейский танковый полк, Military Unit Number 87441 (Chebarkul). It gained the "Guards" title after the beginning of the 2022 Russian invasion of Ukraine.
- 93rd Tank Brigade/4th Tank Army/1st Ukrainian Front
- 96th Tank Brigade/37th Army (in Bulgaria)
- 102nd Tank Brigade formed in 1942 near Moscow. 102-я танковая бригада начала формироваться Директивой НКО № 723491 от 15.02.1942 г. Бригада сформирована по штатам № 010/345 — 010/352. 22-я гвардейская танковая бригада преобразована из 102-й танковой бригады на основании Приказа НКО № 57 от 07.02.1943 г. и Директивы ГШ КА № 36594 от 14.02.1943 г. Became 22nd Guards Tank Brigade of the 5th Guards Tank Corps. Became a tank regiment after the end of World War II. Eventually became 382nd "Port Arthur" Motor Rifle Regiment of the 122nd Guards Motor Rifle Division.
- 108th Tank Brigade - the 108th Tank Division was formed in July 1941 and was in Bryansk Front in early October 1941 with a mix of older T-40s plus T-34s and KV-1s "straight from the factories." It lost most of its armour during the German attack on Oryol and its cadre was redesignated as the 108th Tank Brigade in December.
- 112th "Revolutionary Mongolia" Tank Brigade
- 120th Tank Brigade/11th Guards Army/3rd Belorussian Front
- 122nd Tank Brigade - in January 1942, with 54th Army (Soviet Union), Leningrad Front . See ru:122-я танковая бригада.
- 125th Tank Brigade/35th Army/Far Eastern Front
- 143rd Tank Brigade/6th Guards Army/1st Baltic Front
- 144th Tank Brigade/Belorussian-Latvian Military District
- 149th Tank Brigade/Moscow Military District
- 150th Tank Brigade/3rd Guards Army/1st Ukrainian Front
- 152nd Tank Brigade/52nd Army/1st Ukrainian Front
- 153rd Tank Brigade/2nd Guards Army/3rd BR Front
- 160th Tank Brigade, 11th Tank Corps, 1 July 1942
- 165th Tank Brigade/15th Army/Far Eastern Front
- 171st Tank Brigade/15th Army/Far Eastern Front
- 172nd Tank Brigade/35th Army/Far Eastern Front
- 201st Tank Brigade/Moscow Military District
- 203rd Tank Brigade/15th Army/Far Eastern Front
- 204th Tank Brigade/1st Army/Far Eastern Front
- 205th Tank Brigade/Trans-Baikal Military District
- 206th Tank Brigade/Trans-Baikal Military District
- 208th Tank Brigade/35th Army/Far Eastern Front
- 209th Tank Brigade/35th Army/Far Eastern Front
- 210th Tank Brigade/1st Army/Far Eastern Front
- 213th Tank Brigade/28th Army/3rd BR Front
- 214th Tank Brigade/Severnaya Group/Far Eastern Front
- 218th Tank Brigade/25th Army/Far Eastern Front - eventually became 60th Separate Motor Rifle Brigade
- 220th Tank Brigade/5th Shock Army/1st BR Front
- 226th Tank Brigade/Trans-Caucasian Military District
- 227th Tank Brigade/Trans-Caucasian Military District
- 232nd Tank Brigade/Moscow Military District
- 233rd Tank Brigade
- 234th Tank Brigade
- 238th Tank Brigade - became 5th Motorcycle Regiment, in accordance with a Soviet General Staff Directive on March 26, 1944. On July 14, 1944, the regiment began fighting (became part of the "Active Army"), with the 1st Byelorussian Front. The 3rd Guards Spetsnaz Brigade traces its history to the 5th Motorcycle Regiment.
- 254th Tank Brigade – Stavka Reserve, reorganized as 248th Tank Regiment 21 June 1943
- 255th Tank Brigade – Formed 1942, reorganized as 255th Tank Regiment
- 256th Tank Brigade/Moscow Military District
- 257th Tank Brigade/1st Army/Far Eastern Front, fought in Soviet invasion of Manchuria.
- 258th Tank Brigade/2nd Army/Far Eastern Front, fought in Soviet invasion of Manchuria.
- 259th Tank Brigade/25th Army/Far Eastern Front, fought in Soviet invasion of Manchuria.

== Guards Tank Brigades ==
- 1st Guards Tank Brigade – Converted from 4th Tank Brigade 11 November 1941
- 2nd Guards Tank Brigade – Converted from 9th Tank Brigade 5 January 1942/5th Army/3rd BR Front
- 3rd Guards Tank Brigade – Converted from 8th Tank Brigade 11 January 1942
- 4th Guards Tank Brigade – Converted from 132nd Tank Brigade 24 January 1942
- 5th Guards Tank Brigade – Converted from 142nd Tank Brigade 29 January 1942/18th Army/4th Ukrainian Front
- 6th Guards Tank Brigade – Converted from 1st Tank Brigade 16 February 1942, used to form Guards Sivash Tank School 1944
- 6th Guards Tank Brigade "A" – Converted from 5th Tank Brigade 5 March 1942, redesignated 23rd Guards Tank Brigade 22 February 1943
- 7th Guards Tank Brigade – Converted from 46th Tank Brigade 16 February 1942/Reserve Front HQ/RVGK
- 8th Guards Tank Brigade – Converted from 105th Tank Brigade 23 October 1942
- 9th Guards Tank Brigade – Converted from 17th Tank Brigade 17 November 1942
- 10th Guards Tank Brigade – Converted from 35th Tank Brigade 19 November 1942
- 11th Guards Tank Brigade – Converted from 133rd Tank Brigade 8 December 1942/1st BR Front
- 12th Guards Tank Brigade – Converted from 66th Tank Brigade 2 January 1943, part of 4th Guards Tank Corps.
- 13th Guards Tank Brigade – Converted from 67th Tank Brigade 2 January 1943, part of 4th Guards Tank Corps.
- 14th Guards Tank Brigade – Converted from 174th Tank Brigade 2 January 1943, part of 4th Guards Tank Corps.
- 15th Guards Tank Brigade – Converted from 216th Tank Brigade 8 December 1942
- 16th Guards Tank Brigade – Converted from 19th Tank Brigade 8 December 1942
- 17th Guards Tank Brigade – Converted from 157th Tank Brigade 8 December 1942
- 18th Guards Tank Brigade – Converted from 62nd Tank Brigade 2 January 1943
- 19th Guards Tank Brigade – Converted from 87th Tank Brigade 29 December 1942
- 20th Guards Tank Brigade – Converted from 45th Tank Brigade 7 February 1943
- 21st Guards Tank Brigade – Converted from 69th Tank Brigade 7 February 1943
- 22nd Guards Tank Brigade – Converted from 102nd Tank Brigade 7 February 1943
- 23rd Guards Tank Brigade – Redesignated from 6th Guards Tank Brigade "A" 22 February 1943/2nd BR Front
- 24th Guards Tank Brigade – Reorganized from 52nd Guards Tank Regiment 1943
- 25th Guards Tank Brigade – Converted from 54th Tank Brigade 26 December 1942
- 26th Guards Tank Brigade – Converted from 130th Tank Brigade 26 December 1942
- 27th Guards Tank Brigade – Converted from 121st Tank Brigade 7 February 1943/7th Guards Army/2nd Ukrainian Front
- 28th Guards Tank Brigade – Converted from 28th Tank Brigade 7 February 1943 /39th Army/3rd BR Front
- 29th Guards Tank Brigade – Converted from 146th Tank Brigade 7 February 1943 /Stavka Reserve
- 30th Guards Tank Brigade (ru:30-я гвардейская танковая бригада) – Converted from 61st Tank Brigade 7 February 1943/2nd Shock Army/2nd Belorussian Front
- 31st Guards Tank Brigade – Converted from 235th Tank Brigade 7 February 1943/1st Guards Army/4th Ukrainian Front
- 32nd Guards Tank Brigade – Converted from 13th Tank Brigade 7 February 1943/Moscow Military District
- 33rd Guards Tank Brigade – Converted from 56th Tank Brigade 7 February 1943. Used to form Guards Kharkov Tank School in accordance with 28 August 1944 order.
- 34th Guards Tank Brigade – Converted from 52nd Tank Brigade 7 February 1943/4th Shock Army/1st Baltic Front
- 35th Guards Tank Brigade – Reorganized from 41st Guards Tank Regiment
- 36th Guards Tank Brigade – Reorganized from 42nd Guards Tank Regiment
- 37th Guards Tank Brigade – Reorganized from 21st Guards Tank Regiment
- 38th Guards Tank Brigade – Converted from 180th Tank Brigade 23 October 1943, 38th Guards Tank Brigade/Reserve Front HQ/RVGK
- 39th Guards Tank Brigade – Converted from 192nd Tank Brigade 23 October 1943/4th Shock Army/1st Baltic Front
- 40th Guards Tank Brigade – Converted from 22nd Tank Brigade 23 October 1943
- 41st Guards Tank Brigade – Converted from 90th Tank Brigade 1 March 1943
- 42nd Guards Tank Brigade – Converted from 18th Tank Brigade 10 April 1943/4th Ukrainian Front
- 43rd Guards Heavy Tank Brigade – Converted from 145th Tank Brigade 10 April 1943/3rd BR Front
- 44th Guards Tank Brigade – Converted from 112th Tank Brigade 23 October 1943
- 45th Guards Tank Brigade – Converted from 200th Tank Brigade 23 October 1943
- 46th Guards Tank Brigade – Converted from 233rd Tank Brigade 4 November 1944
- 47th Guards Tank Brigade – Converted from 51st Tank Brigade 20 November 1944
- 48th Guards Tank Brigade – Converted from 109th Tank Brigade 20 November 1944
- 49th Guards Tank Brigade – Converted from 107th Tank Brigade 20 November 1944
- 50th Guards Tank Brigade – Converted from 50th Tank Brigade 20 November 1944
- 51st Guards Tank Brigade – Converted from 30th Tank Brigade 26 July 1943
- 52nd Guards Tank Brigade – Converted from 97th Tank Brigade 26 July 1943
- 53rd Guards Tank Brigade – Converted from 106th Tank Brigade 26 July 1943
- 54th Guards Tank Brigade – Converted from 88th Tank Brigade 26 July 1943
- 55th Guards Tank Brigade – Converted from 113th Tank Brigade 26 July 1943
- 56th Guards Tank Brigade – Converted from 195th Tank Brigade 26 July 1943
- 57th Guards Tank Brigade – Converted from 33rd Tank Brigade 26 July 1943
- 58th Guards Tank Brigade – Converted from 26th Tank Brigade 19 September 1943
- 59th Guards Tank Brigade – Converted from 99th Tank Brigade 19 September 1943
- 60th Guards Tank Brigade – Converted from 169th Tank Brigade 19 September 1943
- 61st Guards Tank Brigade – Converted from 197th Tank Brigade 23 October 1943
- 62nd Guards Tank Brigade – Converted from 243rd Tank Brigade 23 October 1943
- 63rd Guards Tank Brigade – Converted from 244th Tank Brigade 23 October 1943
- 64th Guards Tank Brigade – Converted from 49th Tank Brigade 23 October 1943, 1st GTA, 1st BR Front
- 65th Guards Tank Brigade – Converted from 103rd Tank Brigade 20 November 1944
- 66th Guards Tank Brigade – Converted from 164th Tank Brigade 20 November 1944
- 67th Guards Tank Brigade – Converted from 29th Tank Brigade 12 February 1945
- 68th Guards Tank Brigade – Converted from 93rd Tank Brigade 17 March 1945
