= Russian Tank Troops =

Armored warfare arm of the Russian Ground Forces

- Танковые войска Вооружённых сил Российской Федерации
- Collar insignia of the Russian Tank Troops (depicting the IS-3 tank)
- Founded: 1991
- Country: Russia
- Allegiance: Russian Armed Forces
- Branch: Ground Forces
- Type: Armoured corps
- Role: Armoured warfare
- Equipment: Tanks, amphibious vehicles

The Russian Tank Troops (Russian: Танковые войска Вооружённых сил Российской Федерации, romanized: Tankovyye voyska Vooruzhonnykh sil Rossiyskoy Federatsii) is the armored warfare branch of the Russian Ground Forces. They are mainly used in conjunction with the Motorized Rifle Troops in the main areas and perform the following tasks:

- in defence – on direct support of the motorized rifle troops in repelling the enemy's offensive and application of counter-attacks and counter-strikes;
- in offence – on delivering powerful cleave strikes deeply, developing success, defeating the enemy in meeting engagements and battles.

The Tank Troops are made up of tank divisions, tank brigades, tank regiments and tank battalions of motorized rifle and tank brigades which are highly resistant to the damaging effects of nuclear weapons, have high firepower, high mobility and manoeuvrability. They are able to make full use of the results of nuclear fires - nuclear destruction of the enemy - and, ideally, can quickly achieve the ultimate military goals of any combat or operation.

The combat capabilities of tank formations and subunits enable them to lead active combat operations, day and night, in significant isolation from other troops, to smash the enemy in meeting engagements and battles, on the move to overcome the extensive areas of contamination, to force water barriers, as well as to quickly build a solid defence and successfully resist the attack of superior forces of the enemy.

Further development and increase of the combat capabilities of the Tank Troops are carried out mainly at the expense of its framing with more advanced types of tanks, in which there is the optimal combination of such vital military properties as high firepower, manoeuvrability and reliable protection. In improving the organizational forms the main efforts are focused on giving them the combined-arms nature, what to the utmost suits the content of modern operations (combat actions).

Their service anniversary, Day of Tankmen, is marked annually every second Sunday of September. The official motto of the Russian tank troops is "The Armor is Hard and Our Tanks Are Fast!" («Броня крепка и танки наши быстры») by the first stanza of the March of the Soviet Tankmen from the 1939 Soviet film Tractor Drivers.

== Brief history ==
Russia's first ever armoured unit, the 1st Machine Gun Automobile Regiment of the Imperial Russian Army, was raised on 19 August 1914 on the basis of a training mobile company. It was already on the first weeks since the First World War began, and Russia's first armoured vehicles were a number of Russian-produced Russo-Balt armoured cars with British engines from the Austin Motor Company, the first ever to be produced in the country and the first also to see combat, marking the beginning of an era of armoured warfare in Russian lands.

By 1917 and the aftermath of the February Revolution came yet another, the Austin-Putilov armored car, also produced with British support, which saw action in the war and in the events following the October Revolution. These two cars, by the time the Russian Civil War began in 1918, would form the Red Army's first ever armored components - a number of armored companies and battalions. Joined by captured Mark V tanks and a number of armored vehicles of both local and Western manufacture and trucks fitted with cannons and machine guns the small armored park grew on to form part of the growing force, with a seventeen Renault FT tanks - called the "Russian Reno", all remanufactured by the Krasnoye Sormovo Factory No. 112 in Nizhny Novgorod with a locally produced derivative, the "Freedom Fighter Lenin", the first true tank ever to be made - becoming thus the pioneer locally produced armoured vehicles produced by the young Russian military industry. Their appearances in all national parades in Red Square in Moscow beginning in 1921, alongside a number of foreign armoured vehicles made under license to assist the young army, showed the Soviet government's priorities on making armoured warfare part of the national strategy for the Soviet Armed Forces as a whole in its modernization and expansion to keep up with the times.

The formation of the Tank Bureau under the People's Commisariat of Defence in 1924, with the existence of a armoured car battalion under the Technical Directorate of the WPRA (today the Main Agency of Automobiles and Tanks of the Ministry of Defense of the Russian Federation) marked the formation of the modern day Tank Troops, which would materialize in the raising in the summer of 1929 within the Moscow Military District of the first ever Soviet mechanized regiment, the Joint Mechanized Regiment. With its T-18 tanks, the first to be designed by Russians, among its inventory of equipment, the regiment's tank battalion was but the first of many to be raised in the coming years.

In the period 1955–1991, Soviet tank forces were the strongest in the world. In 1987, the troops had 53.3 thousand tanks. According to Ministry of Defense of the USSR, on January 1, 1990, there were 63,900 tanks in total (including in the Treaty on Conventional Armed Forces in Europe zone — 41,580.), 76,520 infantry fighting vehicles and armored personnel carriers. According to other sources, in the early 1990s, the country had 65,000 tanks – more than all the countries of the world combined. Zakhar Grigorievich Oskotsky writes that on January 1, 1991, there were over 69 thousand tanks in the Soviet army in units and in storage.

== Organization ==
At the time of the Fall of the Soviet Union there were five tank divisions stationed on the territory of the Russian Soviet Federative Socialist Republic: the 1st Tank Division (Kaliningrad), the 4th Guards Tank Division; the 5th Guards Tank Division; the 21st Guards Tank Division; and the 40th Guards Tank Division (Sovetsk). In September 1993 the 1st Tank Division became the 2nd Tank Brigade; then a weapons and equipment storage base in 1998; and then, finally, was disbanded in 2008.

In the twenty-first century, a tank brigade is the second largest, after the tank division, of the formations of the Russian Tank Troops. According to the shtat (Table of Organization and Equipment), on average, there are about two to three thousand personnel in a tank brigade. In the Armed Forces of the Russian Federation the specified tank brigade commander's rank is colonel (major general being the minimum for a division). There are also a number of MBT battalions in the motorized rifle brigades and independent battalions.

Today the formations of the Tank Troops include:

=== Divisional regiments ===
- 1st Guards Tank Regiment of the 2nd Guards Motor Rifle Division in Moscow Oblast.
- 6th Guards Tank Regiment of the reformed 90th Guards Tank Division in Chebarkul.
- 10th Tank Regiment of the 6th Motor Rifle Division.
- 11th Tank Regiment of the 18th Guards Motor Rifle Division in Gusev, Kaliningrad Oblast, established in January 2019.
- 12th Guards Tank Regiment of the 4th Guards Tank Division in Naro-Fominsk.
- 13th Guards Tank Regiment of the 4th Guards Tank Division in Naro-Fominsk.
- 17th Tank Regiment of the 70th Motor Rifle Division.
- 19th Tank Regiment of the 67th Motor Rifle Division.
- 26th Tank Regiment of the 47th Tank Division in Mulino.
- 59th Guards Tank Regiment of the 144th Guards Motor Rifle Division in Yelnya, Yelninsky District, Smolensk Oblast.
- 68th Guards Tank Regiment of the 150th Motor Rifle Division in Persianovsky.
- 80th Guards Tank Regiment of the 90th Guards Tank Division in Chebarkul.
- 153rd Tank Regiment of the 47th Tank Division in Mulino.
- 163rd Guards Tank Regiment of the 150th Motor Rifle Division in Persianovsky.
- 218th Tank Regiment of the 127th Motor Rifle Division in Sergeyevka.
- 237th Tank Regiment of the 3rd Motor Rifle Division in Valuyki.
- 239th Guards Tank Regiment of the 90th Guards Tank Division in Chebarkul.

=== Brigades ===
- The Russian Ministry of Defence announced in 2015 that the 1st Guards Tank Brigade was to reform from the 10th Guards Uralsko-Lvovskaya Tank Division of the 20th Guards Army, Boguchar, but this did not eventually happen.
- 4th Separate Guards Tank Brigade (Naro-Fominsk), formed from 4th Guards Tank Division in 2009 and expanded back into 4th Guards Tank Division in 2013.
- 5th Separate Guards Tank Brigade of the 36th Army (Ulan-Ude)
- 6th Tank Brigade of the 1st Guards Tank Army (Mulino), used to form 47th Tank Division in 2022.
- 7th Separate Guards Tank Brigade (Chebarkul), formed from 295th Guards Motor Rifle Regiment of 34th Motor Rifle Division in 2009, became 239th Guards Tank Regiment of the reformed 90th Guards Tank Division in 2016.
- On 19 November 1993 the 40th Guards Tank Division, part of the 11th Guards Army, at Sovetsk in the Kaliningrad Oblast, was reduced in status to become the 10th Guards Tank Brigade. In June 1997 it was renamed the 196th Guards Weapons and Equipment Storage Base; the storage base was disbanded in 2008.
