= Trial of Vadim Shishimarin =

Trial of Russian war criminal

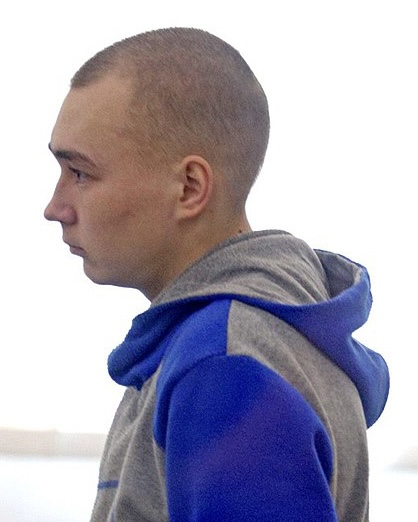
- Shishimarin on a trial in May 2022
- Court: Kyiv, Ukraine
- Decided: May 23, 2022; 3 years ago
- Verdict: Convicted: life imprisonment; reduced to 15 years in prison on appeal
- Charge: War crimes

Vadim Yevgenyevich Shishimarin (Russian: Вадим Евгеньевич Шишимарин; born 17 October 2000) is a Russian soldier who was the first person to go on trial for war crimes committed during the 2022 Russian invasion of Ukraine. On 18 May 2022, he pleaded guilty to fatally shooting an unarmed civilian, Oleksandr Shelipov. On 23 May, he was sentenced to life imprisonment. Shishimarin's lawyer lodged an appeal and on 29 July 2022, his sentence was reduced to 15 years in prison. Law professor Chris Jenks suggested that the legal reasoning, conviction and sentencing appeared to be flawed.

== Background ==
Shishimarin was born in the Russian city of Ust-Ilimsk in Irkutsk Oblast. He was a sergeant and squad leader in the 13th Guards Tank Regiment of the Russian Army's 4th Guards Tank Division.

On 28 February 2022, while retreating to join other Russian units, his group of five soldiers hijacked a private vehicle and drove to Chupakhivka, Sumy Oblast, about 200 miles east of Kyiv. On the way, they saw Oleksandr Shelipov, a 62-year-old Ukrainian man, former bodyguard of Leonid Brezhnev, who was riding a bicycle and talking on the phone. Warrant Officer Makeev, who outranked Shishimarin, ordered the sergeant to shoot the man. He refused, but another soldier named Kufakov repeated the command. Shishimarin fired three to four rounds from a Kalashnikov assault rifle through an open car window at Shelipov, who would die a few dozen meters from his own house. At the next village, the tank team was ambushed, killing Kufakov. After escaping, the remaining members eventually surrendered. According to Ukrainian officials the shooting was captured on video. On 4 May, the Security Service of Ukraine posted a video of Shishimarin describing how he had shot the victim. On 18 May Ukrainian Prosecutor General Iryna Venediktova said her office had been preparing war crimes cases against as many as 41 Russian soldiers.

Shishimarin said he was ordered to shoot the civilian because it was feared the man would give away the position of the Russian soldiers.

== Trial ==
Shishimarin was charged with premeditated murder and violating the laws and customs of war. Even though he is a prisoner of war, his trial took place in a civilian court because Ukraine had abolished its military justice system. Related articles were then added to its domestic criminal code. On 13 May 2022 Shishimarin appeared at a pretrial hearing and chose to be tried by a three-judge panel rather than by a single judge or by a jury.

I'm truly and sincerely sorry. I didn't want that to happen, I didn't want to be there, but it happened. I would like to apologise once again. And I will accept all the measures of punishment that I will be offered.

— Vadim Shysimarin, spoken statement in court

Kateryna, the victim's widow, said she was still coping with her husband's death. "I feel very sorry for him," she said. "But for a crime like that - I can't forgive him." She attended the court hearing and saw Shishimarin admit his guilt.

On 18 May, Shishimarin pleaded guilty to the killing. According to law professor Chris Jenks, Shishimarin appeared to have pled guilty only to the act of killing, but not to the actual criminal charges of murder or violating the laws of war. At the hearing the following day, Shelipov's wife, Kateryna Shelipova, testified that the incident took place around 11 am, when her husband was unarmed and dressed as a civilian. She was getting water from a well when the shooting happened and would later find her husband dead with a shot in his head. 20-year-old Ivan Matysov, another captive Russian soldier who was in the same car with Shishimarin, also testified at the hearing. He confirmed that Makeev and a third serviceman, Kufakov, commanded Shishimarin to shoot, although Kufakov might not have been a more senior officer. In the car at the time, Makeev and another officer, Lieutenant Kalinin, outranked both Shishimarin and Maltisov. They believe that Kufakov also outranked them, but he was later killed in an ambush and his first name and actual rank have yet to be established. Shishimarin told Shelipov's widow, "I acknowledge my blame... I ask you to forgive me." Shelipova told the court that he deserves a life sentence, but she would not object if he were released to Russia in exchange for the return of the Ukrainians who surrendered at Mariupol.

The prosecution argued that Shishimarin was not obliged to comply with the order, which did not come from his immediate commander. The defence wanted to call Makeev and Kalinin as witnesses but found out that they had already returned to Russia as part of a prisoner exchange with Ukraine.

On 20 May, Shishimarin's defence lawyer asked for his client to be acquitted of war crimes. Shishimarin stated to the court that he hadn't intended to kill Shelipov. Shishimarin's lawyer also argued that Shishimarin had intended not to kill but only to carry out the order formally, which Shishimarin had refused twice before succumbing to pressure from other soldiers. He further argued that the shots were unaimed, fired from a moving vehicle with a bad tyre, and only one bullet out of the burst hit. The prosecution argued that Shishimarin could have fired fewer rounds or left the car to seize Shelipov's phone.

Shishimarin was sentenced to life imprisonment on 23 May 2022. Judge Serhiy Agafonov said Shishimarin had committed murder with intent and violated the laws and customs of war, carrying out a "criminal order" by a soldier of higher rank. The defence lawyer said he will appeal, saying it was the most severe sentence.

On 29 July 2022, a Court of Appeal in Kyiv reduced his sentence to 15 years in prison. After serving his sentence, Shishimarin will be deported to Russia and banned from entering Ukraine for 5 years.

== Criticism ==
Chris Jenks, Professor of Law at the Dedman School of Law in Dallas, Texas, stated that it appeared that key elements of the prosecution's case for a war crime were missing. One apparent flaw was that it did not appear to have been shown that Shishimarin was aware that he was carrying out an illegal order, an element "at the core of the case". Shishimarin's "age, rank, experience and circumstances" should have been considered in deciding whether he was aware of the illegality. Another apparent flaw, according to Jenks, was that the possibility of the Russian forces believing Shelipov to have been a justified military target had not been established to have been unreasonable.

== See also ==
- Trial of Alexander Bobikin and Alexander Ivanov
