= Nikolay Lapygin =

Nikolay Ivanovich Lapygin
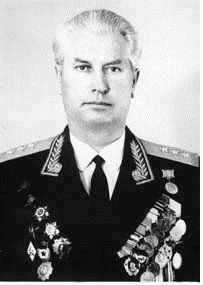
- Born: 12 December 1922; Lavrovka village (now in Gribanovsky District, Voronezh Oblast), RSFSR
- Died: 20 August 2011 (aged 88) Moscow, Russia
- Allegiance: Soviet Union
- Branch: Red Army (later Soviet Army)
- Service years: 1940–1987
- Rank: Colonel general
- Commands: 4th Guards Tank Division; 20th Guards Army
- Conflicts: World War II
- Awards: Order of Lenin

Nikolay Ivanovich Lapygin (Russian: Николай Иванович Лапыгин; 12 December 1922 – 20 August 2011) was a Soviet Army colonel general who held army command during the Cold War.

As a tank platoon and company commander, Lapygin was decorated for his actions in World War II. Postwar, he held staff positions and rose to regimental and division command, serving in East Germany. Lapygin commanded the 20th Guards Army for two years and ended his active service as chief of staff of the Transbaikal Military District.

== Early life and World War II ==
Nikolay Ivanovich Lapygin was born on 12 December 1922 in the village of Lavrovka, Polyanovsky District, Voronezh Oblast. His parents were collective farmers, and his father was killed on the Leningrad Front in January 1942 while fighting as an ordinary soldier. Lapygin completed the village school. Conscripted into the Red Army after completing school, he was enrolled as a cadet at the 1st Ulyanovsk Tank School of the Red Army on 22 September 1940. After graduation in December 1941, he was appointed commander of a tank platoon of the 2nd Training Tank Regiment at Stalingrad in January 1942. On 25 March 1942 he became commander of a tank platoon of the 67th Tank Brigade at Stalingrad. Entering battle on 28 July, Lapygin was soon seriously wounded and evacuated to a hospital in Stalingrad. In August he was transferred to the 28th Separate Tank Battalion of the Stalingrad Front, serving as a tank platoon commander. The unit lacked tanks and was tasked with defending an island on the Volga and the right bank of the river. Lapygin became an infantry platoon commander, fighting with small arms, including machine guns.

In November Lapygin was sent to the rear to command a tank platoon of the 22nd Training Tank Battalion at Chelyabinsk. On 8 January 1943 he transferred to command a tank platoon in the 59th Separate Tank Regiment, forming at the Kosteryovo camps in the Moscow Military District. Lapygin would spend the rest of his combat service with this T-34-equipped unit. Sent to the Voronezh Front, the regiment fought in the Voronezh–Kastornoye offensive and Operation Star with the 40th Army. During the Third Battle of Kharkov, in fighting near Sumy on 26 February, Lapygin's tank was wrecked and he was wounded. He was reported by his superiors to have not left the battle despite being wounded, led his crew into the attack, and credited with killing several Germans in hand-to-hand combat; for this action he received the Medal for Courage on 18 May. Lapygin played dead, crawled away from the battlefield, and bandaged his own leg wound. With the help of locals he found the field hospital, where he was treated. Making his way to the village of Bolshaya Pisarevka, Lapygin saw the tanks of his regiment and met them. He was sent to the army field hospital in Voronezh Oblast, requesting to be sent back to his unit, preparing for battle in the Kursk bulge. Returning to his unit, Lapygin found that he had been awarded the Medal for Courage.

In early July he participated in the Battle of Kursk as a tank company commander. When the regiment launched a counterattack against the German advance on 9 and 10 July, Lapygin's company was credited with the destruction of six tanks and three self-propelled guns, and Lapygin himself was credited with the destruction of a tank and a self-propelled gun. For this action and for his performance in the training of his company while the regiment was in army reserve before Kursk, he was awarded the Order of the Patriotic War, 2nd class, on 7 August. Lapygin was wounded three times in the back by shell fragments that penetrated his tank on 5 August during the Belgorod–Kharkov offensive. He was treated in the frontline hospital north of Voronezh, near his native village.

Returning to the regiment, on 12 October he rose to become assistant chief of staff of the regiment for reconnaissance, assigned to the 60th Army of the 1st Ukrainian Front. Before the beginning of the offensive to take the Ukrainian capital in the Battle of Kiev, Lapygin distinguished himself in organizing reconnaissance of the forward German defenses. Repeatedly personally scouting the German anti-tank defenses with a reconnaissance group, he participated in the regiment's attack and was credited with killing several German soldiers. For this action he was awarded the Order of the Red Star on 19 November. In the winter of 1943–1944, the regiment fought in the Zhitomir–Berdichev offensive, in which Lapygin again distinguished himself. Organizing reconnaissance of the German positions, Lapygin personally went out on scouting missions with the reconnaissance platoon. The platoon was credited with taking six prisoners for interrogation, and capturing 32 other prisoners, two vehicles and a motorcycle. During the regiment's strike against the main German line of communications on the Zhitomir–Novohrad-Volynsky highway, he was credited with finding a path for the tanks to the German positions and organizing a tank ambush. For this performance Lapygin was awarded the Order of the Patriotic War, 1st class on 18 January 1944.

In mid-1944 Lapygin and his unit fought in the Lvov–Sandomierz offensive, in which he was decorated for the last time during the war. In the breakthrough of German defenses at Trostyanets Lapygin organized reconnaissance and led a tank group supporting the assault by an infantry battalion, that attacked into the German rear. In the area of Krugov he was credited with flanking a German counterattack by leading the tank group into the German rear. In this action the group was credited with destroying two self-propelled guns and seven guns. For this action he was awarded the Order of Alexander Nevsky on 15 August. By the time the battle for Lvov began only sixteen tanks remained in the regiment and the regimental commander and chief of staff were wounded. As a result Lapygin briefly became acting commander of the regiment. The war ended for Lapygin when he was sent to the Military Academy of Armored and Mechanized Forces for advanced training on 24 December 1944.

== Postwar ==
After graduating from the academy on 31 August 1948, Lapygin became an officer of the reconnaissance department of the headquarters of the 8th Mechanized Army in the Carpathian Military District. He was transferred to the headquarters of the district armored and mechanized forces commander as an officer of the operational and combat training department on 6 October 1949. He became senior officer of the department on 25 October of that year. Lapygin spent two years in Moscow as an officer of the 1st department of the Directorate of military educational institutions of the Armored and Mechanized Forces from 31 August 1950, transferring to the second department of the directorate on 27 September of that year.

In early 1953, Lapygin was sent to the Group of Soviet Forces in Germany, where he would spend the next eight years. He became chief of staff of the 54th Guards Tank Regiment of the 7th Guards Tank Division of the 3rd Guards Mechanized Army on 19 March 1953. Lapygin swiftly rose to command the 28th Tank Regiment of the 21st Guards Mechanized Division of the 8th Guards Army on 1 September 1955 and was acting chief of staff of the 27th Guards Tank Division from 30 September 1958, a position that he was confirmed in on 23 October of that year.

He was sent to the Military Academy of the General Staff on 2 September 1961 for senior command training, and after graduation from the academy on 24 June 1963 became commander of the 28th Tank Division on 8 August of that year. Lapygin transferred to command the elite 4th Guards Tank Division on 19 June 1965 and became first deputy commander of the 1st Guards Tank Army on 15 May 1968. He returned to East Germany as commander of the 20th Guards Army on 12 May 1970. Lapygin rose to chief of staff and 1st deputy commander of the Transbaikal Military District on 19 October 1972, a position he held until his transfer to the Group of Inspectors General in October 1979. After serving in this sinecure position, Lapygin retired in 1987. He died in Moscow on 20 August 2011.

== Awards and decorations ==
Lapygin was a recipient of the following decorations:

- Order of Lenin
- Order of the October Revolution
- Order of Alexander Nevsky
- Order of the Red Banner
- Order of the Patriotic War, 1st class (2) and 2nd class
- Order of the Red Star (2)
- Medal for Courage
- Medal for Battle Merit
- Foreign orders

== Dates of rank ==
- Lieutenant (12 October 1941)
- Senior Lieutenant (17 April 1943)
- Captain (18 August 1943)
- Major (2 August 1948)
- Lieutenant Colonel (5 September 1951)
- Colonel (20 May 1957)
- Major General of Tank Troops (16 June 1965)
- Lieutenant General of Tank Troops (8 November 1971)
- Colonel General (14 February 1978)
