= 1st Tank Brigade =

1st Tank Brigade or 1st Army Tank Brigade may refer to:

- 1st Canadian Tank Brigade
- 1st Army Tank Brigade (United Kingdom)
- 1st Army Tank Brigade (New Zealand) (1941–42, broken up to provide personnel and equipment for the 4th New Zealand Armoured Brigade, New Zealand 2nd Division)
- 1st Light Tank Brigade (Soviet Union)
- 1st Tank Brigade (Soviet Union)
- 1st Tank Brigade (Ukraine)

== See also ==
- 1st Armored (disambiguation)
- 1st Brigade (disambiguation)
