= 239th Guards Tank Regiment (Russia) =

239th Guards Red Banner Orders of Zhukov, Suvorov, Kutuzov and Alexander Nevsky Orenburg Cossack Tank Regiment
- 239-й гвардейский танковый Краснознамённый, орденов Жукова, Суворова, Кутузова и Александра Невского Оренбургский казачий полк (239 гв. тп)
- Shoulder sleeve insignia of the regiment
- Active: 1941–present
- Country: Soviet Union (until 1991); Russia
- Branch: Soviet Army (until 1991); Russian Ground Forces
- Type: Tank Troops
- Part of: 90th Guards Tank Division
- Garrison/HQ: Chebarkul
- Engagements: World War II; Syrian Civil War; Russo-Ukrainian War; War in Donbas; Invasion of Ukraine
- Decorations: Guards; Order of the Red Banner; Order of Alexander Nevsky; Order of Suvorov 3rd class Order of Zhukov; Order of Kutuzov 3rd class
- Battle honours: Orenburg Cossack

The 239th Guards Red Banner Orders of Zhukov, Suvorov, Kutuzov and Alexander Nevsky Orenburg Cossack Tank Regiment (239 gv. tp) (Russian: 239-й гвардейский танковый Краснознамённый, орденов Жукова, Суворова, Кутузова и Александра Невского Оренбургский казачий полк (239 гв. тп); Military Unit Number 89547) is a tank regiment of the Russian Ground Forces. Part of the 90th Guards Tank Division, the regiment is based in Chebarkul.

The regiment began its history as horse cavalry during World War II. After the end of the war, the regiment was converted into the 42nd Guards Mechanized Regiment in 1945 and became the 295th Guards Motor Rifle Regiment in 1957. The regiment was reorganized as the 7th Separate Guards Tank Brigade in 2009. It was expanded to reform the 90th Guards Tank Division in 2016, and the lineage of the unit continued with the 239th Guards Tank Regiment of the new division. With the division, the 239th Guards was committed to the Russian invasion of Ukraine.

== History ==
=== World War II ===
The unit was formed as the 240th Cavalry Regiment of the 73rd Cavalry Division in August 1941 in Biysk. With the division, it was relocated to the Berdino station in Bryansk Oblast in May 1942, where the remnants of the 55th Cavalry Division were merged into the 73rd. The combined division was redesignated as the 55th Cavalry Division and the 240th was renumbered as the 84th Cavalry Regiment, taking the same number as a regiment of the original 55th Cavalry Division. Subsequently, in February 1943 the regiment became the 55th Guards Cavalry Regiment and the division became the 15th Guards Cavalry Division in recognition of a successful raid behind German lines in the direction of Cherukhino and Debaltsevo. For its "successful completion of combat tasks" in the destruction of German troops and capture of Kalisz and Łódź the regiment received the Order of Suvorov, 3rd class.

For its breakthrough of German defenses east of Stargard and the capture of Bärwalde, Wengerin, Labes, Schivelbein, and Körlin, the regiment was awarded the Order of Alexander Nevsky on 26 April 1945. The regiment ended the war at Rathenow, west of Berlin. For its "fulfillment of assigned missions" in the battles for the capture of Rathenow, Spandau, and Potsdam, the regiment was awarded the Order of Kutuzov, 3rd class. During the war, 11,237 soldiers of the regiment were decorated and eight received the title Hero of the Soviet Union.

=== Post-1945 ===
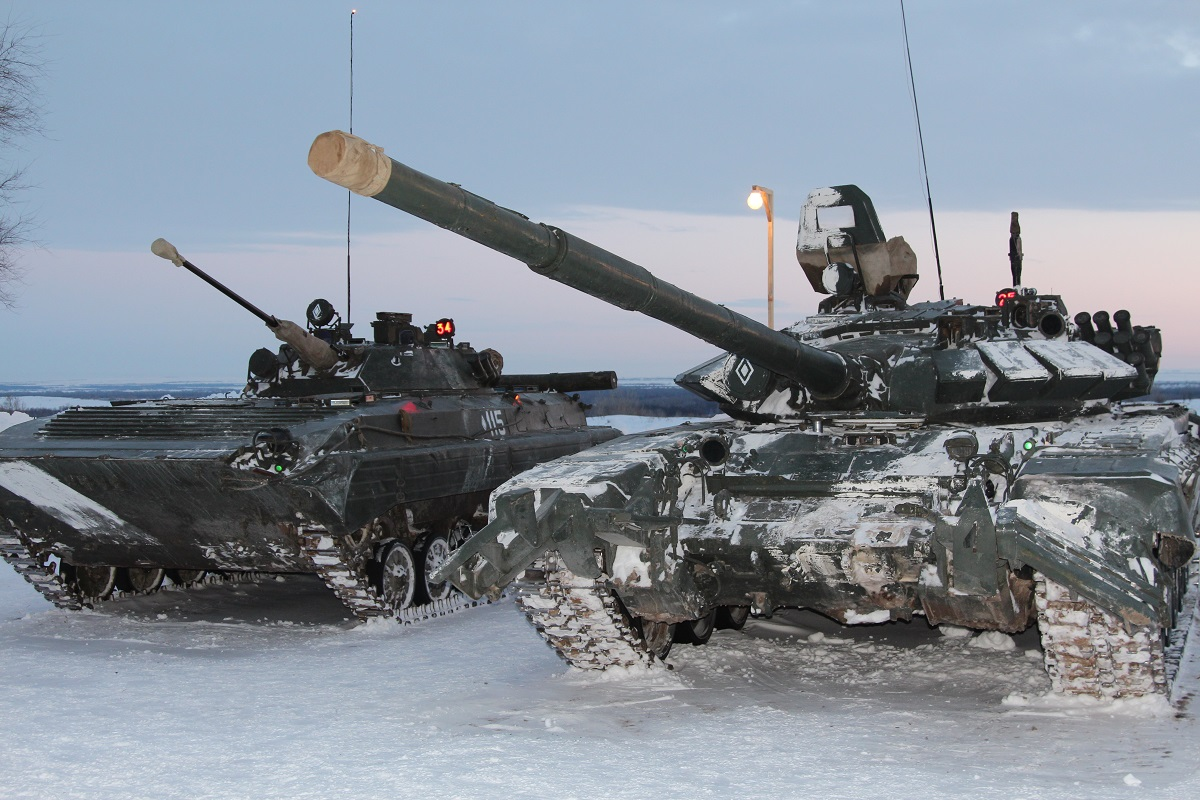
BMP-2 and T-72BA of the 90th Guards Tank Division, 2017

Postwar, the regiment was relocated to Brest and became the 42nd Guards Mechanized Regiment on 6 September 1945 when the division became the 12th Guards Mechanized Division. On 16 May 1957, it was reorganized as the 295th Guards Motor Rifle Regiment. With the 15th Guards Tank Division, the regiment participated in the 1968 Warsaw Pact invasion of Czechoslovakia. Following the end of the invasion, the regiment was garrisoned at Milovice with the division as part of the Central Group of Forces. In 1990, the regiment was withdrawn to Chebarkul with the division. The regiment received the Orenburg Cossack honorific on 15 June 1994. The 15th Guards Tank Division was disbanded in 2004 and the regiment transferred to the 34th Motor Rifle Division. On 1 March 2009, the regiment was reorganized as the 7th Separate Guards Tank Brigade. Elements of the brigade participated in the war in Donbas in late 2014 and early 2015. Social media posts by members of the brigade revealed that elements of the brigade were deployed to Palmyra around April 2016 for the Russian military intervention in the Syrian civil war. By 1 December 2016, the brigade was used to form the new 90th Guards Tank Division, with the awards and traditions of the 7th Separate Guards Tank Brigade transferred to the 239th Guards Tank Regiment of the division. A previous unrelated 239th Guards Tank Regiment had served alongside the 295th Guards Motor Rifle Regiment in the 15th Guards Tank Division.

During the Russian invasion of Ukraine, battalion tactical groups drawn from the 90th Guards Tank Division, including the 6th and 239th Guards Tank Regiments, were committed to the Kyiv offensive. While attacking during the battle of Brovary around 10 March, they were reported by Ukrainian intelligence to have suffered heavy losses, and were forced to retreat and shift to defense. Investigation by Russian opposition news website Meduza revealed that elements of the regiment were involved in war crimes including the killing of civilians and rape in the village of Bohdanivka, Brovary Raion while it was under Russian control. The regiment was awarded the Order of Zhukov on 15 June for its performance in the invasion.
