= 13th Guards Tank Regiment =

13th Guards Tank Shepetovka Red Banner Orders of Suvorov and Kutuzov Regiment
- Russian: 13-й гвардейский танковый Шепетовский Краснознамённый, орденов Суворова и Кутузова полк
- Shoulder sleeve patch
- Active: 1942–2009; 2013–present
- Country: Soviet Union (to 1991); Russia (1992–present)
- Branch: Soviet Army; Russian Ground Forces
- Type: Armored
- Part of: 4th Guards Tank Division
- Garrison/HQ: Naro-Fominsk
- Equipment: T-80U, T-80UE-1
- Engagements: World War II; 1991 Soviet coup d'état attempt; 1993 Russian constitutional crisis; Russo-Ukrainian War; Invasion of Ukraine
- Decorations: Order of the Red Banner; Order of Suvorov, 2nd Class; Order of Kutuzov, 2nd Class
- Honorifics: Shepetovka

The 13th Guards Tank Shepetovka Red Banner Orders of Suvorov and Kutuzov Regiment (Russian: 13-й гвардейский танковый Шепетовский Краснознамённый, орденов Суворова и Кутузова полк, romanized: 13-y gvardeyskiy tankovyy Shepetovskiy Krasnoznamonnyy, ordenov Suvorova i Kutuzova polk; Military Unit Number 32010) is a tank regiment, formerly of the Soviet Army and now of the Russian Ground Forces. The regiment is part of the 4th Guards Tank Division, based at Naro-Fominsk.

The regiment was formed during World War II as the 67th Tank Brigade in 1942 and became the 13th Guards Tank Brigade in 1943. The brigade fought as part of the 4th Guards Tank Corps for the rest of war. The brigade was reorganized as the 13th Guards Tank Regiment when the corps became the 4th Guards Tank Division soon after the end of the war in 1945, and has been stationed at Naro-Fominsk since then. Together with the division, the regiment has played a prominent role in the Moscow Victory Day Parade. The regiment has been committed to the Russian invasion of Ukraine together with its division.

== World War II ==
The regiment traces its history back to the 67th Tank Brigade. Formed in early 1942 near Stalingrad at the Stalingrad Armored Center, Colonel Nikolay Golyas was appointed brigade commander in May. The brigade was assigned to the 17th Tank Corps in June and was sent with the corps to the 60th Army of the Bryansk Front in July, where it saw combat for the first time in the Battle of Voronezh. After rebuilding in the Reserve of the Supreme High Command (RVGK), the corps returned to combat on 5 December in Operation Little Saturn, fighting under the Voronezh and later the Southwestern Front. The brigade and corps joined the 1st Guards Army on 28 December. The brigade was converted into the 13th Guards Tank Brigade on 2 January 1943 when the corps became the 4th Guards Tank Corps in recognition of its performance during the operation. Golyas was killed in action on the next day and replaced by Lieutenant Colonel Leonid Baukov. In February, during the Third Battle of Kharkov, the brigade and corps became part of the operational group of Markian Popov. The brigade fought in the battle for Barvenkovo and on the approaches to Izyum. After the Soviet defeat at Kharkov, the brigade and its corps were withdrawn to the RVGK for rebuilding in March.

The brigade and the 4th Guards Tank Corps returned to combat in July with the 27th Army for the Belgorod–Kharkov offensive operation. From December, the corps served with the 60th Army of the 1st Ukrainian Front. During the Zhitomir–Berdichev offensive, the brigade fought in the capture of Volodarsk and Chervonoarmeysk. For the capture of Shepetovka in Ukraine during the Rovno–Lutsk offensive, the brigade received the name of the city as an honorific on 17 February 1944. The 13th Guards fought in the capture of Ternopol during the Proskurov–Chernovitsy Offensive, and received the Order of the Red Banner for its "fulfillment of combat missions" during the capture of the city on 26 April. In mid-1944 the brigade participated in the Lvov–Sandomierz offensive.

Lieutenant Colonel Semyon Kurkotkin became brigade commander in November after Baukov was promoted to corps deputy commander. With the corps, the brigade fought in the Upper Silesian offensive and the Lower Silesian offensive in early 1945, during which it participated in the capture of Kraków and Katowice. With the corps, the brigade was among the vanguard of the Red Army as it approached the Elbe during the Berlin Offensive, fought in the taking of Dresden, and ended the war in Prague during the Prague offensive. The brigade was awarded the Order of Suvorov, 2nd class on 26 April for its performance in the destruction of German troops southwest of Oppeln, and the Order of Kutuzov, 2nd class on 28 May for its breakthrough of German defenses on the Neisse and the capture of Cottbus, Lübben (Spreewald), Zossen, Beelitz, Luckenwalde, Treuenbrietzen, Zahna, Marienfelde, Trebbin, Rangsdorf, Dietersdorf, and Keltow. Twelve soldiers of the brigade was awarded the title Hero of the Soviet Union for their actions during the war.

== Cold War ==
After the end of the war, the brigade was reorganized as the 13th Guards Tank Regiment on 3 July 1945 when the 4th Guards Tank Corps became the 4th Guards Tank Division. The regiment was withdrawn to Naro-Fominsk in the Moscow Military District with the division. The regiment remained based there with the same designation for the entire Cold War. The regiment together with other division units participated in the first Red Square parade for the Day of Tankmen on 2 September 1946; with the 4th Guards Tank Division, it received a prominent role in parades on Red Square displaying the latest military equipment. According to data released in accordance with the Treaty on Conventional Armed Forces in Europe on 19 November 1990, the regiment fielded 119 T-80UD tanks in addition to five T-64 and three T-72, 73 infantry fighting vehicles (39 BMP-2, 32 BMP-1, and two BRM-1K), six BTR-70, 12 2S1 Gvozdika, one PRP-3, three BMP-1KSh, three 1B18, one 1B19, two R-145BM, BTR-50PUM, one PkhM-4, one MTP-1, two MTU-20, and one MT-LBT.

== Russian service ==
The tanks of the regiment were ordered into Moscow by the coup plotters known as the State Emergency Committee during the 1991 August Coup. President Boris Yeltsin ordered them into Moscow again during the 1993 October Coup, during which they shelled the White House on 4 October. Individual servicemen and elements of the regiment participated in the First Chechen War and the Second Chechen War.

During the 2009 reform of the Russian Armed Forces, the 4th Guards Tank Division was reorganized as the 4th Separate Guards Tank Brigade, resulting in the disbandment of the regiment. The regiment was reformed in 2013 when the brigade was expanded into the 4th Guards Tank Division, which became part of the revived 1st Guards Tank Army a year later. In 2016, open-source intelligence data reported that the regiment was equipped with 63 T-80U and 31 T-80UE-1 main battle tanks. A battalion of 30 T-34/85 tanks was added to the regiment in 2019 to participate in the Moscow Victory Day Parade and reenactments, although tank crews conduct live-fire exercises. These tanks were manufactured in Czechoslovakia and donated to Russia by the Lao People's Army.

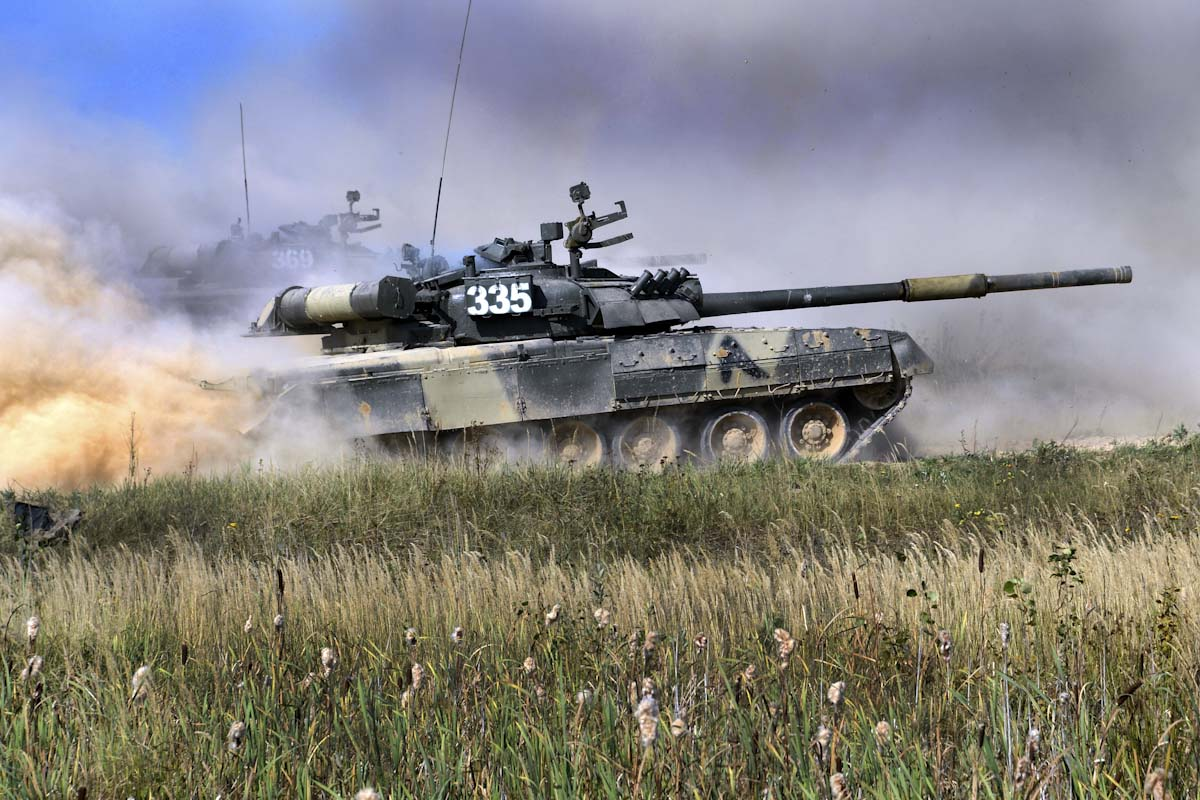
T-80U of the type used by the regiment during division exercises, 2018

In mid-2014, elements of the division, including personnel from the regiment, were sent to Ukraine to fight in the war in Donbas.

With the rest of the 4th Guards Tank Division and 1st Guards Tank Army, the regiment participated in the Russian invasion of Ukraine, advancing on the Sumy axis. During this period, Sergeant Vadim Shishimarin, a squad leader of the regiment, shot a civilian in Chupakhivka in response to orders from his superior on 28 February. After his surrender to Ukrainian troops, Shishimarin became the first Russian soldier tried and convicted of war crimes during the war. The regiment was forced to retreat from Trostianets, after which Ukrainian intelligence reported that its commander had shot himself on 26 March, reportedly due to the discovery that 90% of his tank fleet was inoperable due to rampant parts theft. After the Russian retreat from Sumy Oblast, the regiment was committed to the Donbas by early April, and reportedly took part in combat with Ukrainian forces near Sulyhivka in Kharkiv Oblast. In April 2022, elements of the regiment were reportedly seen near Sievierodonetsk, along with elements of the 423rd Guards Yampolsky Motor Rifle Regiment.
