= 90th Guards Tank Division (2016–present) =

Russian Ground Forces formation

- 90-я гвардейская танковая дивизия
- Emblem of the division
- Active: 2016–present
- Country: Russia
- Branch: Russian Ground Forces
- Type: Armoured
- Size: 10,000 soldiers, 300 T-72 tanks
- Part of: Central Military District; 41st Guards Combined Arms Army
- Garrison/HQ: Chebarkul
- Nicknames: Vitebsk; Novgorod
- Equipment: T-72A/B/BA/B3, BMP-2, BTR-82A, Grad MLRS, TOS-1, 2S12, 2S3.
- Engagements: Russo-Ukrainian War; Russian invasion of Ukraine; Kyiv offensive; Battle of Brovary; Battle of Lysychansk; Battle of Ocheretyne; Pokrovsk offensive; Battle of Kurakhove; Novopavlivka offensive
- Decorations: Order of the Red Banner (2)
- Battle honours: Guards

Commanders
- Current commander: Major general Ramil Rakhmatulovich Ibatullin

90th Guards Tank Vitebsk-Novgorod Twice Red Banner Division (Russian: 90-я гвардейская танковая Витебско-Новгородская дважды Краснознамённая дивизия; Military Unit Number 86274) is a Russian armoured division. The division was formed by December 2016 in the Central Military District.

== History ==
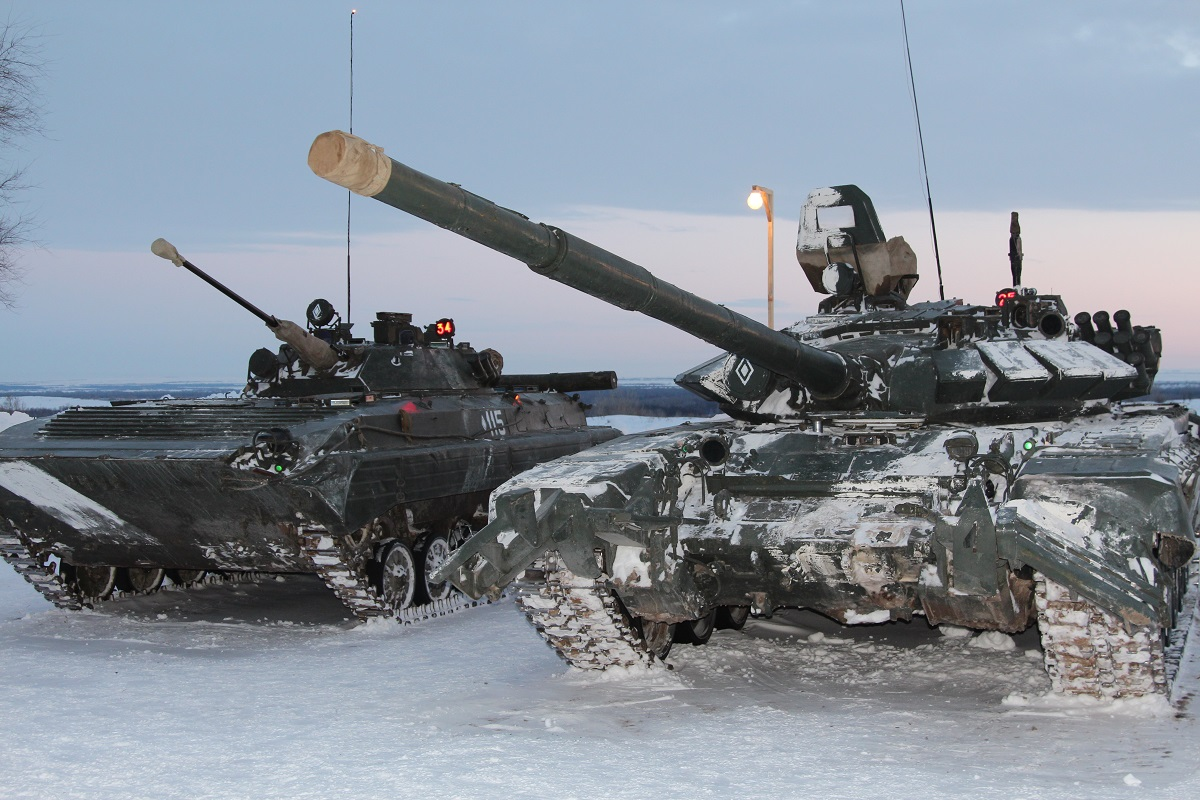
A BMP-2 and a T-72BA of the 90th Guards Armored Division in 2017.

=== Establishment ===
The 90th Guards Tank Division was reformed by December 2016 in the Central Military District, carrying on the lineage of the 90th Guards Rifle Division. The division inherited the awards and history of the 6th Guards Motor Rifle Division, the former 90th Guards Rifle Division. The division was formed in accordance with an order of the Supreme Commander-in-Chief of the Russian Armed Forces and decree of the Russian Defence Minister dated 13 September 2016. The division is based in the Chelyabinsk and Sverdlovsk Oblasts. The division was formed form the 7th Separate Guards Tank Brigade, whose traditions were continued by the 239th Guards Tank Regiment, and the 32nd Separate Motor Rifle Brigade, perpetuated by the 228th Motor Rifle Regiment. To continue the heritage of the 30th Ural Volunteer Tank Corps, the tank battalion of the 228th Motor Rifle Regiment was designated as the Ural Tank Battalion.

On 19 August 2017, the 90th anniversary of the division and the 76th anniversary of the 239th Guards Tank Regiment were solemnly celebrated. A reconstruction of the seizure of Vitebsk (in Belarus) was organized, in which the T-34/85 tank was involved. Demonstration performances of the servicemen of the reconnaissance battalion took place. The company of the Guard of Honor of the Central Military District demonstrated combat bearing and possession of weapons. The division's amateur art ensemble performed.

On June 30, 2018, an ukaz of President Vladimir Putin officially conferred the honorifics Guards Vitebsk-Novgorod upon the division, while the 6th Tank Regiment became the 6th Guards Lvov Tank Regiment and the 400th Self-Propelled Artillery Regiment received the honorific Transylvania.

=== 2022 Russian invasion of Ukraine ===
On February 24, 2022, the division participated in the 2022 Kyiv offensive during the initial stage of the Russian invasion of Ukraine to the north-east of Kyiv. The 90th Guards Tank Division had two battalion tactical groups involved in an engagement near Brovary, where according to Ukrainian media, the division suffered significant losses in personnel and equipment. The Ukrainian Ministry of Defence reported on 10 March 2022 that the commander of the 6th Guards Lvov Tank Regiment, Colonel Andrey Zakharov, was killed in the battle. During the night of 11–12 March, Ukrainian sources claimed that up to 80 military vehicles of the division's 228th Regiment were destroyed near Chernihiv, as they attempted to cross a river in order to advance on Kyiv.

By late March, the division, along with other Russian units, began a hasty retreat out of Kyiv Oblast. Afterwards, the division redeployed to Eastern Ukraine, receiving BMPT Terminator tank support combat vehicles to join the Russian Airborne Forces fighting in Lysychansk.

On Friday 9 December 2022, the British government sanctioned the commander of the division (Colonel Ramil Rakhmatulovich Ibatullin) along with 30 other individuals. The sanctions, co-ordinated with international allies, were taken to mark International Anti-Corruption Day on Friday and Human Rights Day on Saturday.

== Composition and equipment ==
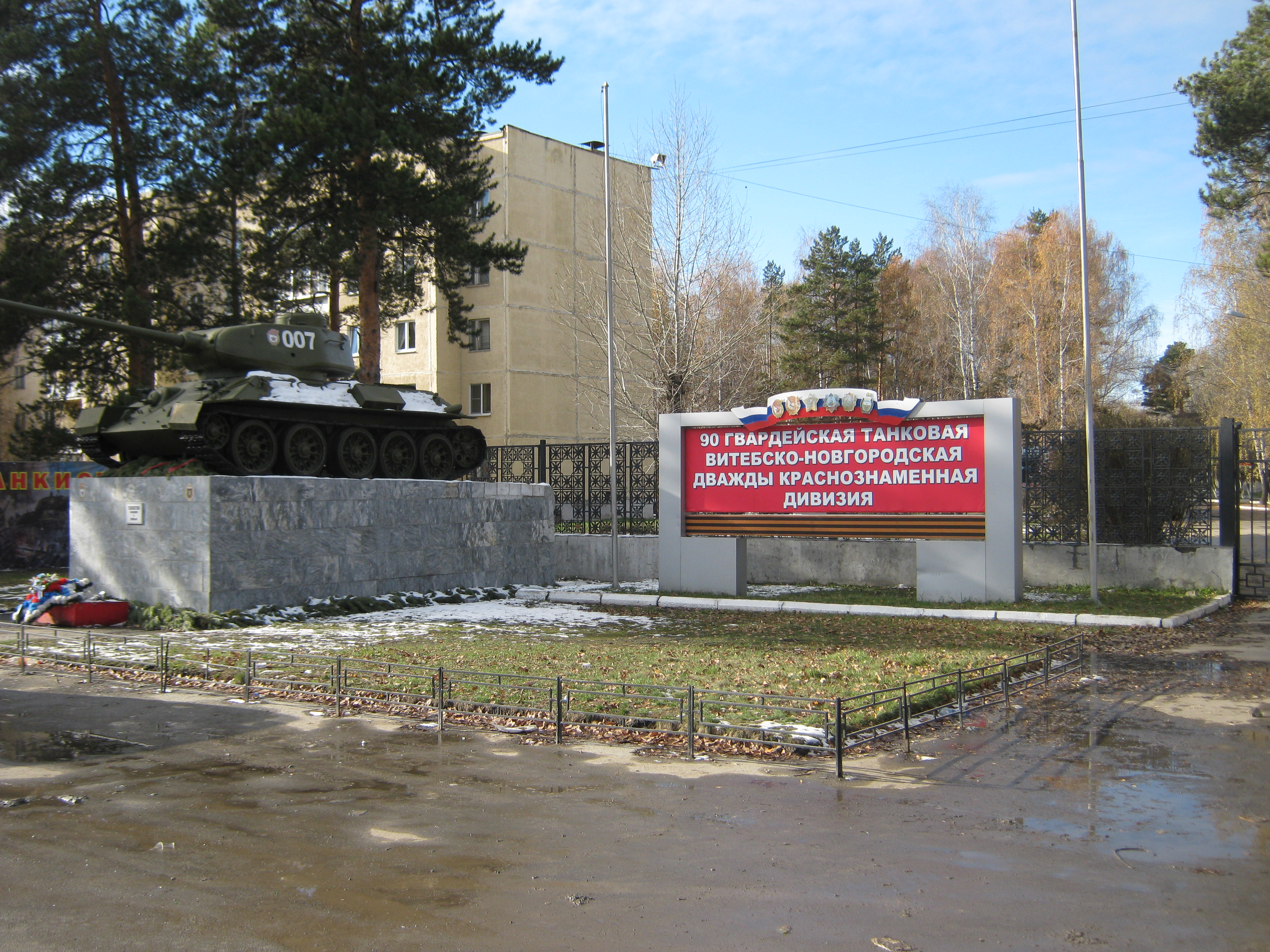
A T-34 tank on a plinth at the entrance to the division's base in Chebarkul, 2016

Composition

- 90th Guards Tank Division
  - Headquarters
    - 26th Separate Medical Battalion
    - 30th Separate Reconnaissance Battalion
    - 33rd Separate Signal Battalion
    - 351st Separate Engineer Sapper Battalion
    - 1122nd Separate Supply Battalion
  - 6th Guards Lvov Tank Regiment
  - 80th Guards Tank Regiment, Military Unit Number 87441 (Chebarkul). The regiment traces its history to the 80th Tank Brigade of the 20th Tank Corps. NKO Directive No. 723190ss of January 21, 1942, ordered its establishment at Sormovo, Gorky Oblast. It fought among the ranks of the Active Army for five periods from April 1942 to 1945. It gained the "Guards" title after the beginning of the 2022 Russian invasion of Ukraine.
  - 228th Guards Motor Rifle Regiment
  - 239th Guards Tank Red Banner Order of Suvorov, Kutuzov, Alexander Nevsky Orenburg Cossack Regiment
  - 400th Guards Transylvania Self-Propelled Artillery Regiment
  - 438th Motor Rifle Regiment
  - 232nd Guards Rocket Artillery Brigade. Awarded the "Guards title" on October 31, 2022.
  - Anti-Aircraft Regiment

Equipment

Equipment in 2018: T-72A/B/BA/B3, BMP-2, BTR-82A, Grad MLRS, TOS-1, 2S12, 2S3.

== Commanders ==
- Colonel/Major General (Guards) Denis Igorevich Lyamin (2016–2017)
- Major General (Guards) Vyacheslav Nikolayevich Gurov (2017–2019)
- Major General (Guards) Vitaly Petrovich Gerasimov (2019–2020)
- Colonel (Guards) Ivan Mikhailovich Shkanov (Septembre 2020 – July 2021)
- Colonel (Guards) Ramil Rakhmatulovich Ibatullin (since July 2021)
- ?
