= Lavrovka =

Lavrovka Лавровка
- Selo
- Location within Voronezh Oblast Location within Russia
- Coordinates: 51°23′N 41°31′E
- Country: Russia
- Region: Voronezh Oblast
- District: Gribanovsky District
- Time zone: UTC+3:00

Lavrovka (Russian: Лавро́вка) is a rural locality (a selo) in Listopadovskoye Rural Settlement, Gribanovsky District, Voronezh Oblast, Russia. The population was 142 as of 2010.

== Geography ==
Lavrovka is located 41 km west of Gribanovsky (the district's administrative centre) by road. Kalinovo is the nearest rural locality.
