= 1st Armored =

1st Armored may refer to:

- 1st Armoured Division (Australia)
- 1st Canadian Armoured Brigade
- 1st Czechoslovak Armoured Brigade
- 1st Armored Division (France)
- 1st Armoured Division (Germany)
- 1st Armoured Division (India)
- 1st Armoured Brigade (Poland)
- 1st Armoured Division (Poland)
- 1st Armoured Division (Syria)
- 1st Armored Brigade (Ukraine)
- 1st Armoured Brigade (United Kingdom)
- 1st Armoured Division (United Kingdom)
- 1st Armored Division (United States)
