= 4th Guards Tank Division =

Russian Ground Forces formation

- 4-я гвардейская танковая Кантемировская дивизия имени Ю. В. Андропова
- Great emblem of the 4th Guards Tank Division
- Active: 1942–2010; 2013–present
- Country: Russia
- Branch: Russian Ground Forces
- Type: Armored
- Size: 12,000–14,000 soldiers, 320 T-80 tanks
- Part of: 1st Guards Tank Army; Moscow Military District
- Garrison/HQ: Naro-Fominsk, Moscow Oblast
- Patron: Yuri Andropov
- Mottos: Honour and glory
- Equipment: T-80U, T-80UYe-1, 2S3 Akatsiya 2S1M1, 2B11, Msta-S, BMP-2, BTR-82А, Uragan, Grad, Tornado-G, Strela-10, 2K22 Tunguska, Tor, Tiger, BREM-1, P-240TMN, R-142N, R-166
- Engagements: World War II; 1991 Soviet coup d'état attempt 1993 Russian constitutional crisis First Chechen War; South Ossetia – 1997; Second Chechen War; Kosovo War; Russo-Ukrainian War: Northern Ukraine campaign; Battle of Trostianets; Eastern Ukraine campaign; Battle of Kharkiv; Kharkiv counteroffensive; Luhansk Oblast campaign; Kupiansk offensive
- Decorations: Guards; Order of Lenin; Order of the Red Banner
- Battle honours: Kantemirovskaya

Commanders
- Current commander: Colonel Yevgeny Nikolayevich Zhuravlyov

Insignia
- Sleeve patch

The 4th Guards Tank Division (Note: Full name 4th Guards Kantemirovskaya Order of Lenin Red Banner Tank Division, also known as the Kantemirovites, the Kantemirovskaya Division, or the Kantemir Division (Russian: 4-я гвардейская танковая Кантемировская дивизия имени Ю. В. Андропова, romanized: 4-ya gvardeyskaya tankovaya Kantemirovskaya diviziya imeni Yu. V. Andropova)) is a Guards armoured division of the Russian Ground Forces. The division is named after Yuri Andropov.

The division has the Military Unit Number 19612 and is one of the key formations of the Moscow Military District. All of the division's units, as well as headquarters, are based in Naro-Fominsk, Moscow Oblast, 70 kilometers (43 mi) southwest of Moscow.

== History ==
=== World War II ===
The direct ancestor of the Division was the Red Army's 17th Tank Corps, initially formed in Stalingrad in 1942 shortly after the 1941 start of the German invasion of the Soviet Union during World War II. The 17th Tank Corps commenced combat operations on 26 June 1942, when it deployed to the west of Voronezh, just before the Battle of Voronezh. For distinction in combat during Operation Little Saturn between 17 December and 30 December 1942, the 17th Tank Corps was renumbered the 4th Guards Tank Corps in January 1943. The Corps received the honorific Kantemirovskaya after the village of Kantemirovka in Kantemirovsky District, Voronezh Oblast, which its tank sub-units liberated from German occupation in their baptism of fire.

In August 1943, the 4th Guards Tank Corps conducted continuous combat operations on the Belgorod-Kharkiv sector of the Kursk Bulge. For the courage and heroism shown during the liberation of cities in right-bank Ukraine, including Zbarazh, Ternopil, and Shepetovka in April 1944, the Corps was awarded the Order of the Red Banner. Seventeen regiments and separate battalions were awarded honorifics of Shepetovsky, Zhitomirsky, Yampolsky, and Tarnopolsky, in honor of the cities they had taken.

The 4th Guards Tank Corps participated in the 1945 battle for Kraków, for which it was awarded the Order of Lenin. The corps was among the first Red Army formations to reach the river Elbe and participate in the capture of Dresden in Germany. The Corps redeployed to Czechoslovakia, where they saw their final fighting of World War II in the suburbs of Prague, during the Prague Offensive.

For the courage shown by Corps soldiers and officers, military units were awarded 23 awards, the staff of the corps was thanked officially by the supreme commander in chief 18 times, 32 of its members were awarded the Hero of Soviet Union (5 of which are forever enlisted in the unit rolls), and more than 20,000 soldiers received awards and medals, five becoming full chevaliers of the Order of Glory.

On 14 June 1945, the 4th Guards Tank Corps became the 4th Guards Kantemirovskaya Tank Division. On 13 September 1945, the division was assigned to the Moscow Military District. The division was re-deployed to Naro-Fominsk outside of Moscow, where it maintains its garrison.

=== Cold War period ===
On 11 September 1946, the Division participated in the Day of Tankmen's parade on Red Square in Moscow. On 23 May 1953, the Division's 3rd Guards Motor Rifle Regiment became the 119th Guards Mechanized Regiment. The 275th Guards Artillery Battalion was formed from the 264th Guards Mortar Regiment and the Howitzer Artillery Battalion. The 76th Separate Motorcycle Battalion was converted into a reconnaissance battalion.

The 120th Guards Anti-Aircraft Artillery Regiment became the 538th Guards Anti-Aircraft Artillery Regiment in April 1955. The 14th Guards Tank Regiment was disbanded in June 1957. At the same time, the 43rd Guards Heavy Tank Self-Propelled Regiment became the 43rd Guards Heavy Tank Regiment and the 119th Guards Mechanized Regiment was redesignated the 423rd Guards Motor Rifle Regiment.

In 1960, the division's tank training battalion was disbanded. In early 1962, the 43rd Guards Heavy Tank Regiment became a regular tank regiment. In February 1962, the 196th Separate Equipment Maintenance and Recovery Battalion and the 339th Separate Missile Battalion were activated. The 106th Separate Sapper Battalion became the 330th Separate Engineer-Sapper Battalion in 1968. In 1972 the separate Chemical Defence Company became the 616th Separate Chemical Defence Battalion. The motor transport battalion was renamed the 1088th Separate Material Supply Battalion in 1980.

In February 1984, the division received the honorific name "in the name of Yuri Andropov", the Soviet General Secretary at the time. In 1989, the 43rd Guards Tank Regiment was replaced by the 14th Guards Tank Regiment. During the Cold War, the division was maintained at 80% strength.

The division was one of the two major divisions deployed in Moscow in August 1991 as part of the failed hardline coup against Soviet President Mikhail Gorbachev.

=== Russian Federation ===
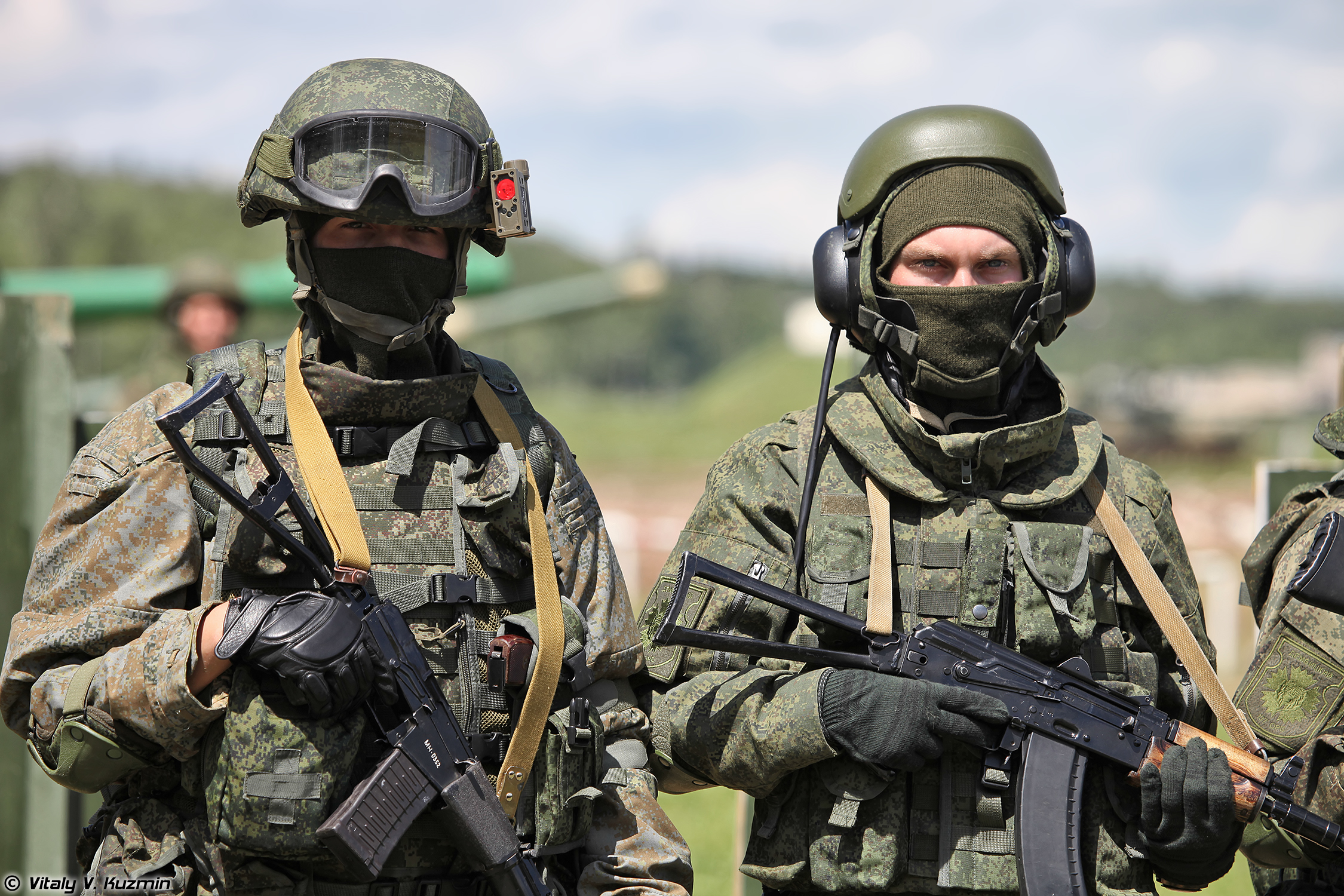
Soldiers of the 4th Guards Tank Division in personal protective Ratnik-2 equipment (on the left - an intelligence officer, on the right - a member of a tank crew), 2017

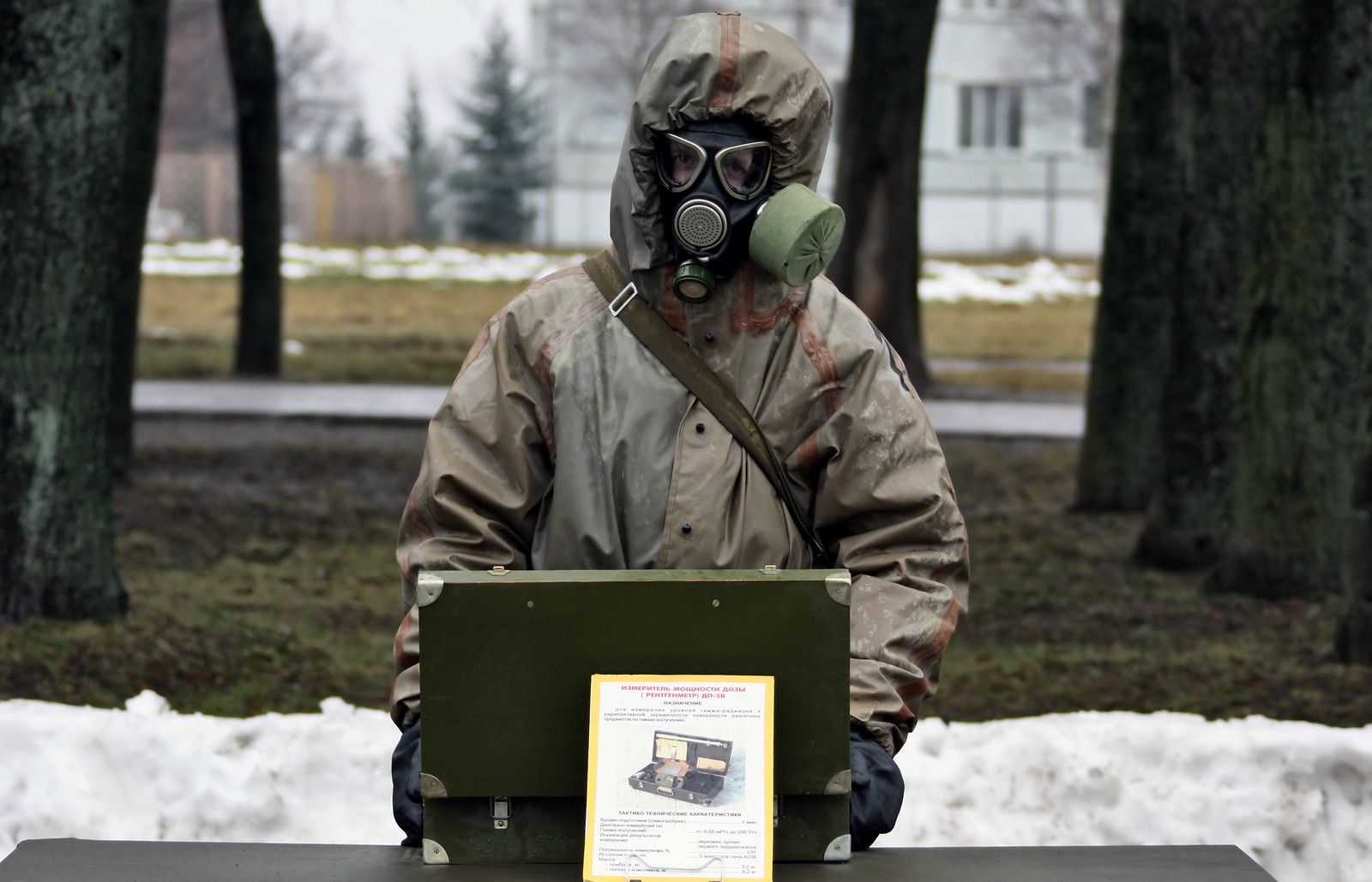
A CBRN Company soldier of the 4th Guards Kantemirovskaya Tank Division

Following the dissolution of the Soviet Union in December 1991, the 4th Guards Tank Division became a part of the Russian Ground Forces, the land forces of the Russian Federation. During the 1993 constitutional crisis of Boris Yeltsin's premiership, the division was one of several key divisions that had given their support to Yeltsin by October 4, the decisive point in the crisis. T-80UD tanks of the Kantemirovsky division took part in the shooting of the White House.

In the early 1990s, the division came under the command of the 1st Guards Tank Army, along with the 144th Guards Motor Rifle Division. The 1st GTA had relocated from East Germany to Smolensk when the Group of Soviet Forces in Germany was disbanded at the beginning of the 1990s. It was disbanded in 1998, as was the 144th MRD. The Kantemirovskaya Division came under the command of the 20th Guards Army.

The division's units participated in the First Chechen War of 1994–1996, and personnel took part in peacekeeping operations in South Ossetia during 1997, in Kosovo from 1998 to 2002, and later participating in the Second Chechen War of 1999–2009. During the period, the division was one of the Russian Army's "constant readiness" divisions, with at least 80% manpower and 100% equipment holdings at all times.

In May 2005, eight T-80BV tanks from the division took part in the parade in Moscow to mark the 60th anniversary of VE Day. In December 2005 the Russian Defence Minister, Sergei Ivanov, visited the Division. In early 2006, the division's 13th Tank Regiment participated, along with other 20th Guards Army units, in the joint Russian–Belarusian "Shield of Union" military exercises.

Kantemirovsky Street in Moscow is named in honour of the 4th Guards Tank Division.

In 2009, the division was reduced to the 4th Separate Guards Tank Brigade later that year, still stationed at Naro-Fominsk. In May 2013, the Kantemirovskaya division was reformed from the tank brigade.

As of June 2015, two years after the division was reconstituted, the Russian Armed Forces planned to rebuild the famous Soviet-era 1st Guards Red Banner Tank Army by including both the 4th Guards Tank Division and the 2nd Guards Motor Rifle Division as well as one tank and rifle brigade (from the 1990s up to its 1998 disbandment the 4th Guards TD formed part of the army).

=== Russo-Ukrainian War ===
On 24 February 2022, Russia launched its invasion of Ukraine. The 1st Guards Tank Army was tasked with the capture of Ukraine's capital, Kyiv, while the 4th Guards Tank Division was tasked with occupying Ukraine's second most populous city, Kharkiv. During the opening hours, the division failed to isolate the city, which was later criticized by western intelligence officers as "hesitant and amateurish." According to a Russian casualty log, the division's parent unit lost 131 tanks as well as 409 troops. Some sources estimated that, because of losses and mechanical issues, that only 1 out of 10 of the division's tanks remained operational. Following the failure to capture Kharkiv, 1st Guards Tank Army commander General-Lieutenant Sergey Kiel was suspended. On 3 May 2022, the division returned to Russia for refitting.

Columns of tanks from the 4th Guards Tank Division passed through the city of Trostianets in Sumy Oblast on 24 February 2022, and units of the division including the 12th and 13th Guards Tank Regiments are reported to have been among the Russian forces which occupied the city.

On 13 May 2022, the division became the first Russian formation to be individually singled out as having allegedly committed war crimes in the invasion. That day, the first war crimes trial began in Kyiv of a soldier from the division who had been ordered to shoot an unarmed civilian in Chupakhivka, Sumy Oblast, reportedly to avoid the chance that he would report Russian troop positions.

By September 2022, the division, while deployed as part of the 1st Guards Tank Army, despite not having fully reconstituted during its rest and refit, was hit by the Ukrainian Kharkiv counteroffensive. Before this, Ukrainian deep strikes on the division's supply lines, coupled with the lack of close air support along the front, contributed to the division's divided, demoralized, and damaged force structure. At the beginning of the counteroffensive, the Ukrainian 4th Tank Brigade attempted to encircle 4th Guards Tank Division units outside of Izium, leading the division to retreat east across the Oskil River towards Lyman, lacking almost all of its heavy equipment and vehicles. Following the losses sustained at Izium, western analysis marked 90 to 100 T-80U losses, half its strength at the time, with many abandoned tanks still intact.The Unit has Suffered has suffered heavy losses of 108 of its T-80Us so far.

== Structure ==
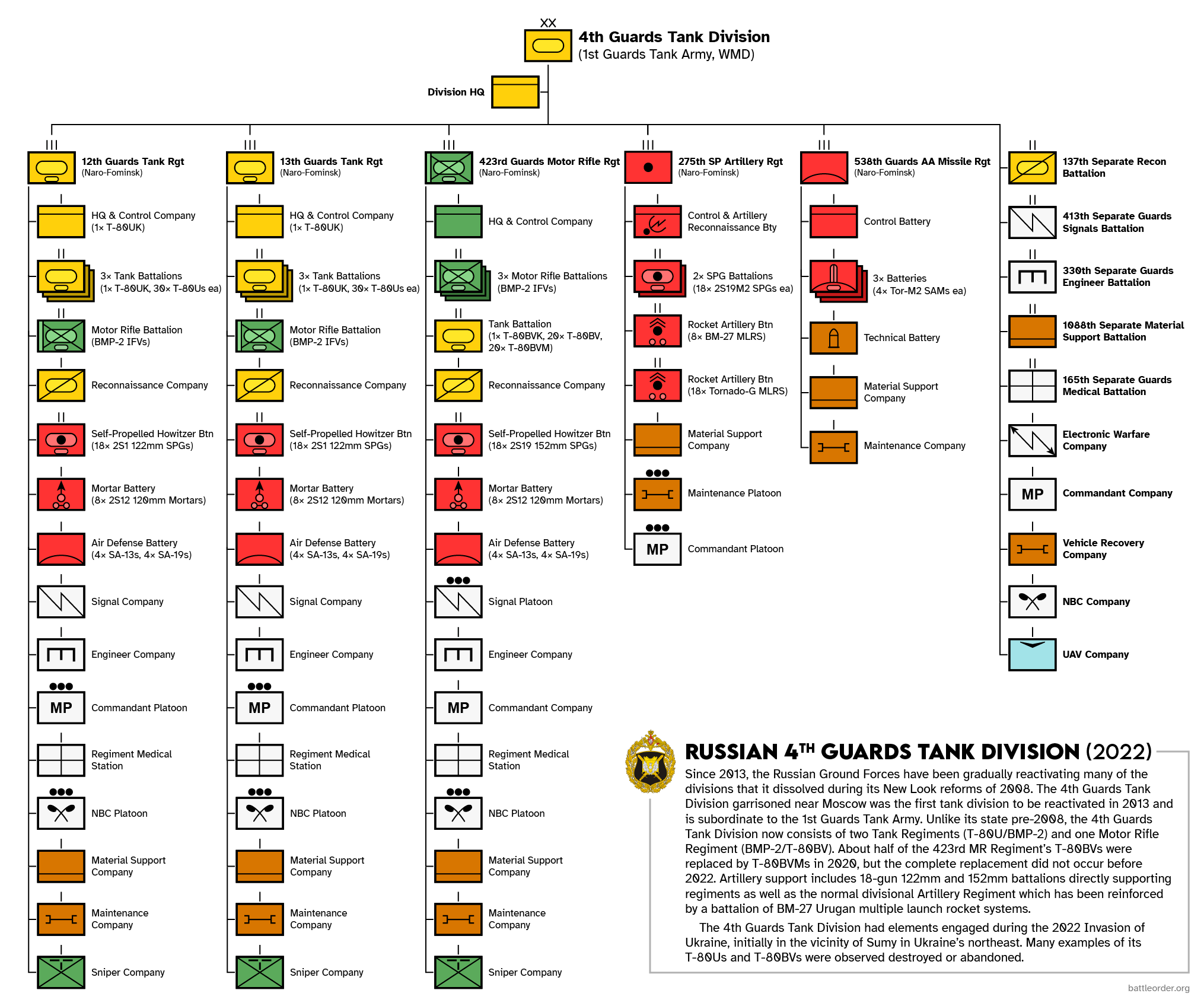
The organization of the 4th Guards Tank Division

The 4th Guards Tank Division consists of a division headquarters, two tank regiments, one motor rifle regiment, an artillery regiment, an anti-aircraft missile regiment, a reconnaissance battalion, and several directly subordinated combat support and combat service support battalions and companies. According to a report from the Institute for the Study of War in March 2018, the division contained:

- Division Headquarters based in Naro-Fominsk commanded by Colonel Oleg Tulinov (Military Unit Number 19612)
- 12th Guards Tank Regiment, Naro-Fominsk
- 13th Guards Tank Regiment, Naro-Fominsk
- 423rd Guards Motor Rifle Regiment, Naro-Fominsk
- 275th Self-Propelled Artillery Regiment, Naro-Fominsk
- 538th Guards Anti-Aircraft Missile Regiment, Naro-Fominsk
- 137th Reconnaissance Battalion, Naro-Fominsk
- 413th Guards Communications Battalion, Naro-Fominsk
- 330th Guards Engineering Battalion, Naro-Fominsk
- 1088th Logistics Battalion, Naro-Fominsk
- 165th Guards Medical Battalion, Naro-Fominsk
- Separate UAV Company
- Separate Electronic Warfare Company
- Separate Chemical Defense Company
- Separate Evacuation Company
- Separate Commandant's Company

Catherine Harris and Frederick Kagan list the 49th Anti-Aircraft Rocket Brigade at Smolensk as part of the division, but the division has a different anti-aircraft rocket regiment and assignment of two such units would be non-standard in terms of Russian division organization. Russian websites do not list the 49th AARB as part of the division.

In 2008, the 4th Guards Tank Division had approximately 12,000 personnel in active service.

== Commanders ==
- Major General Nikolai Filippenko (1952–1957)
- Major General Boris Kurtsev (1957–1960)
- Major General Vladimir Dorodnov (1960–1965)
- Major General Nikolay Lapygin (1965–1968)
- Major General Aleksandr Shalkin (1974–1977)
- Major General Yury Momotov (1979–1982)
- Major General Vladimir Kartmazov (1982–1985)
- Major General Ivan Denisov (1985–1987)
- Major General Nikolay Loktionov (1987–1989)
- Major General Vladimir Chuzhikov (1989–1991)
- Major General Boris Nikolayevich Polyakov (1991–1994)
- Major General Alexander Denisov (1995–1998)
- Major General Yevgeny Fuzhenko (1999–2002)
- Major General Anatoly Yolkin (2002–2003)
- Major General Alexander Romanchuk (November 2003 – July 2006)
- Major General Sergey Kuralenko (July 2006 – June 2009)
- Colonel Sergey Youriévitch Nekrasov (June 2009 - October 2010)
- Colonel Andrey Mordvichev (April 2011 – March 2012)
- Major General Sergei Kombarov (March 2012 – August 2015)
- Major General Andrey Kolesnikov (August 2015 – August 2018)
- Major General Vladimir Zavadsky† (August 2018 – June 2021)
- Colonel Yevgeny Nikolayevich Zhuravlyov (June 2021 – present)

== Unit decorations ==
Ribbon	Award	Year	Location
	Order of Lenin	1944	Krakow
	Order of Red Banner	1944	Ukraine

== Traditions ==
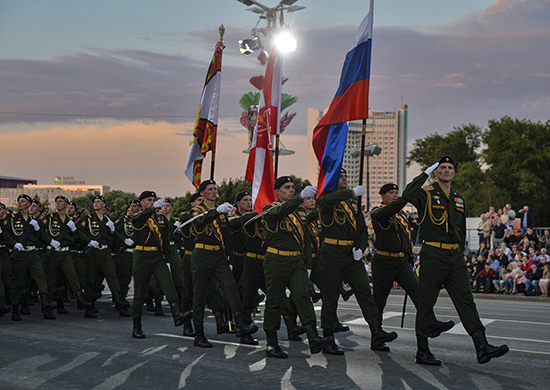
Personnel of the Division at the 2019 Minsk Independence Day Parade

=== Anniversaries ===
The anniversary of the formation of the division is celebrated on June 29 every year, with festive events in Naro-Fominsk. On the divisional parade ground, servicemen are awarded state and departmental awards. Participants see demonstration performances from cadets of the Moscow Higher Military Command School, as well as visit the exhibition of weapons and military equipment. Day of Tankmen celebrations are held by the division.

=== Parades ===
The division participates in both the ground and mobile columns of the Moscow Victory Day Parade on Red Square, representing the forces of the Western Military District in the former. The division took part in a parade in 2013, days after its recreation. As a result of its participation in the Moscow Victory Parade of 1945, it received the honorific of Kantemirovka. The unit's participation in the three-hour Tankmen Day parade in 1946 was decreed by Soviet leader Joseph Stalin.

== Divisional museum ==
Naro-Fominsk hosts a Museum of Military Glory of the tank division. After restoration work in 2017, the exhibition halls were enlarged. The exhibition consists of over 3,000 exhibits, including military equipment and weapons. More than 10,000 people visit the museum annually, and over the years, the museum was visited by the military leadership as well as representatives of over 100 foreign delegations from Europe, The Americas, Asia, and Africa. Since 1987, a museum of the division was made part of Omsk's Boarding School No. 14.

== Equipment ==
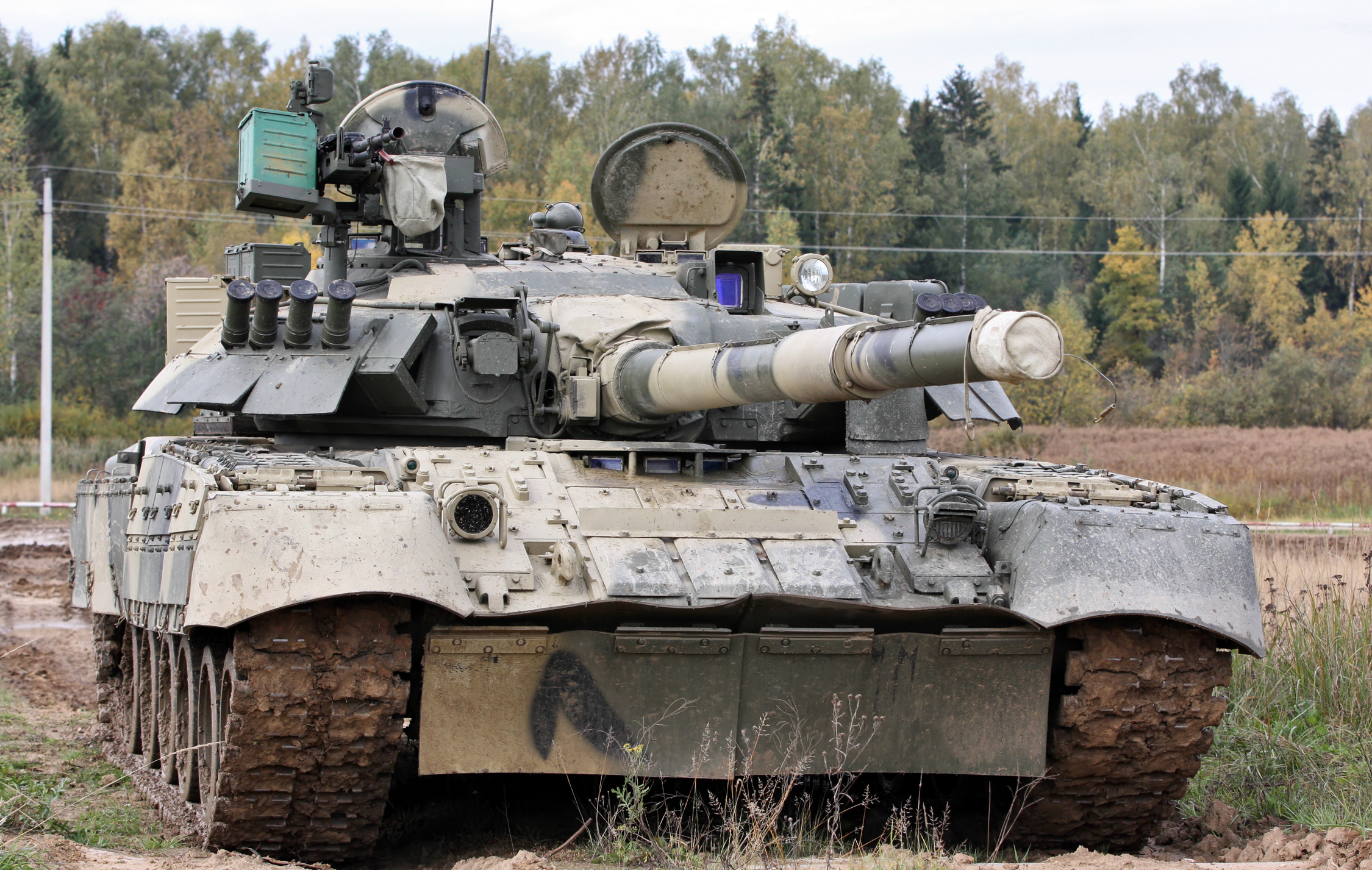
The 4th Tank Division's T-80U during a training exercise.

The division's principal vehicles are the T-80U, T-80BV, and T-80BVM main battle tanks and the BMP-2 infantry fighting vehicle. It makes limited use of the BTR-80 and MT-LB armoured personnel carrier. The 275th Guards Self-Propelled Artillery Regiment attached to the 4th Guards Tank Division vehicles include 2S19 Msta-S and the 2S3 Akatsiya self-propelled artillery systems, 9K51M Tornado-G ,BM-21 Grad, and BM-27 "Uragan" MLRS. 538th Guards Anti-Aircraft Missile Regiment which is attached to the 4th Guards Tank Division vehicles are 9S932-1 (based on MT-LBu) 2K22 Tunguska, 9K35 Strela-10 and the 9K330 Tor M1/M2.

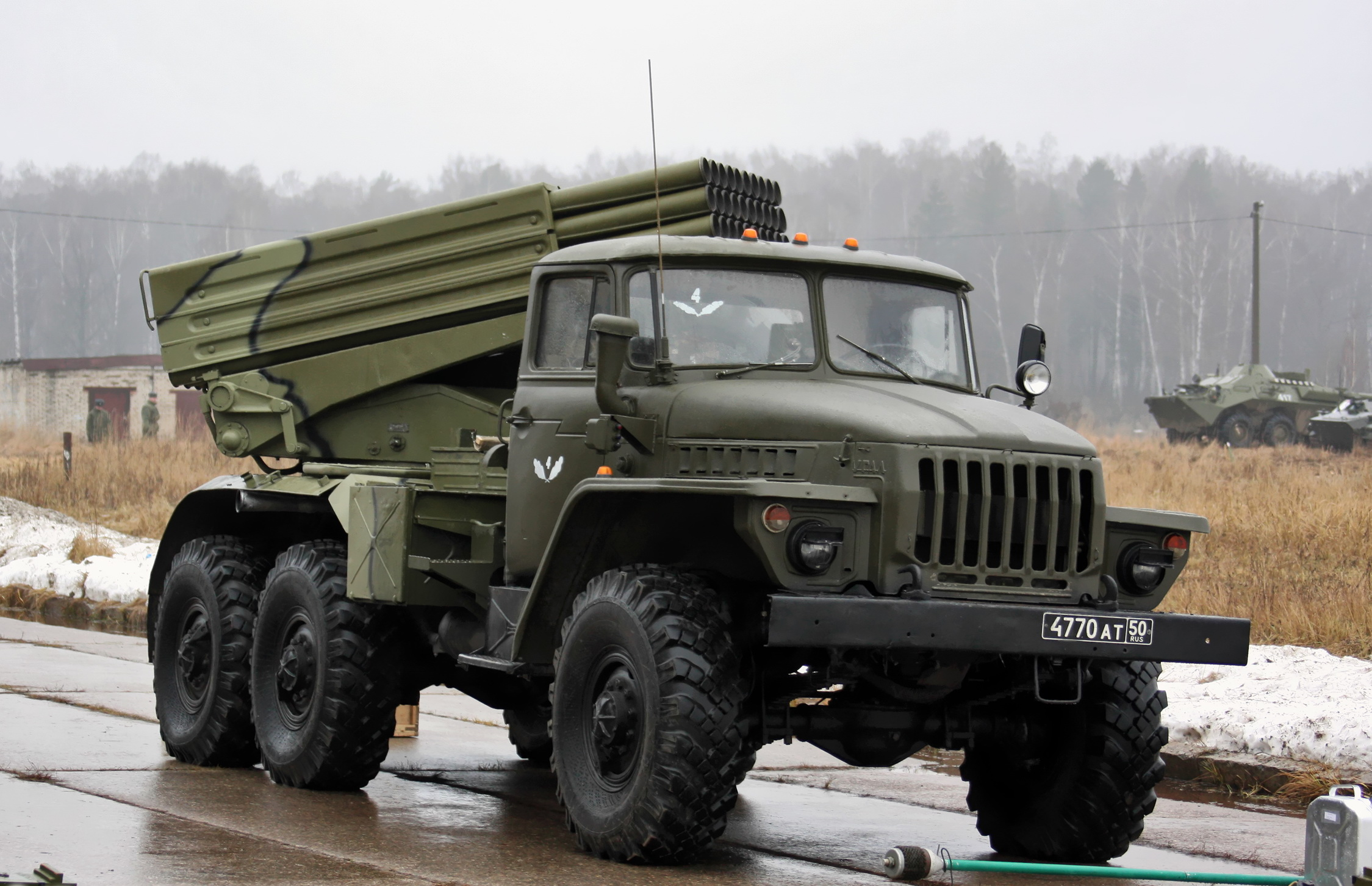
A 4th Tank Division’s BM-21 Grad during a training exercise.

The division's two tank regiments are equipped with the T-80U and smaller numbers of the T-80UE-1 and T-80UK. The division's motor rifle regiment is equipped with a mix of T-80BVs and the upgraded T-80BVMs which it began to receive in company-sized batches in 2020.

Equipment Summary*

Equipment	Numbers
Main Battle Tanks	~188 T-80U, ~20 T-80BVM, ~20 T-80BV
IFV	300 (BMP-2)
Self-Propelled Artillery	90 (2S3 Akatsiya & 2S19 Msta)
Multiple Rocket Launchers	18 BM-21, 8 BM-27
*Equipment representative of the division between the late 2010s and the 2022 Russian invasion of Ukraine.

== See also ==
- 2nd Guards Motor Rifle Division, commonly known as the Tamanians or Taman Division, is another elite Guards armoured division of the Russian Ground Forces
- Russian Guards
