= Day of Tankmen =

Professional military holiday in Russia

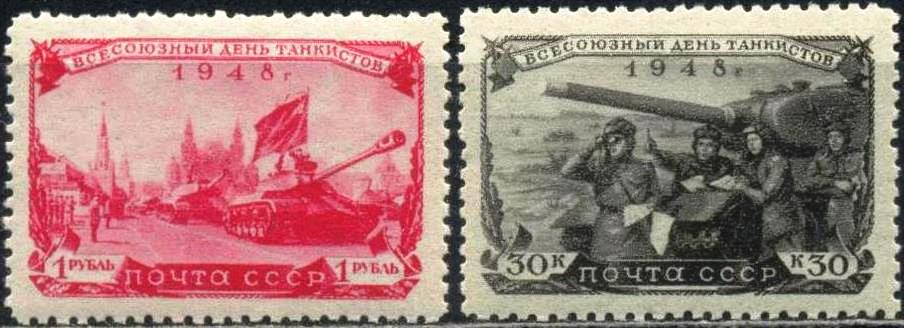
A stamp in 1948.

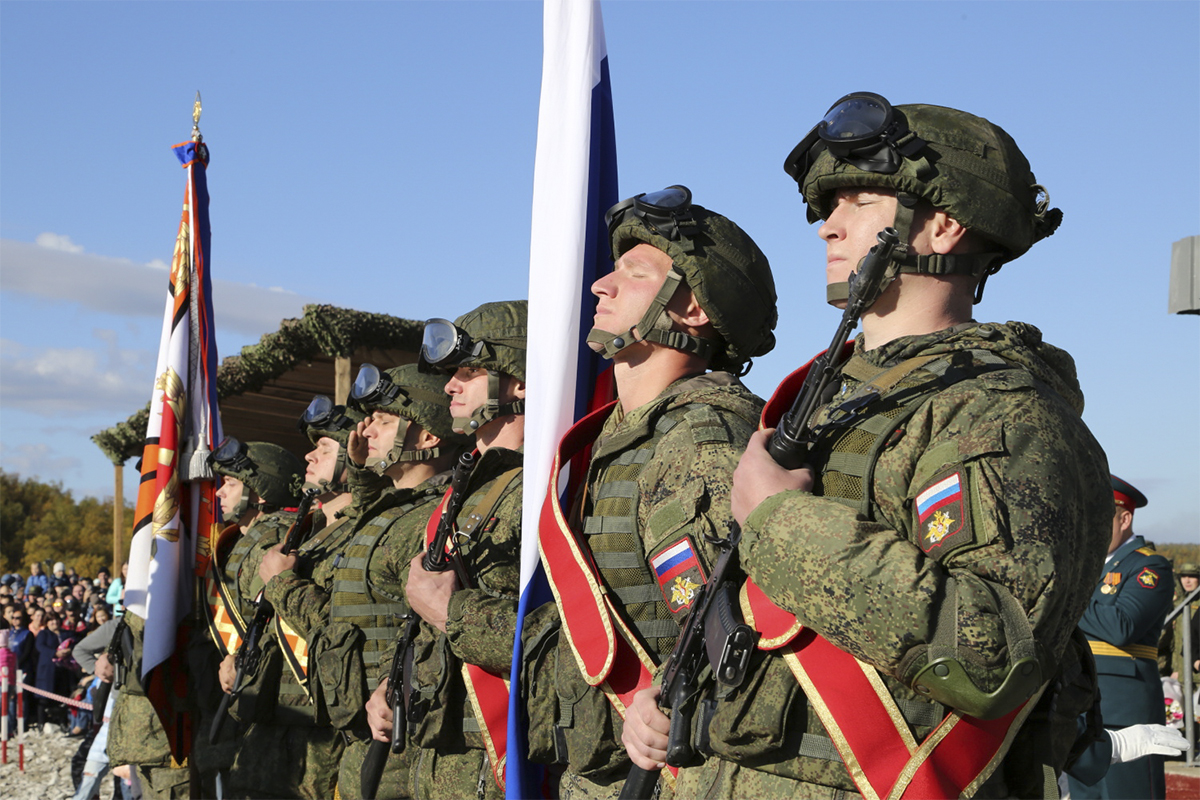
Soldiers of the Russian military during the holiday in 2018.

Day of Tankmen (Russian: День танкиста, romanized: Den tankista) is a professional military holiday in Russia and the former Soviet Union, celebrated every second Sunday of September. It celebrates the service and sacrifices of tank crews and commanders in armored formations since the Russian Civil War, when tanks were first used in Russian territory.

== History of the holiday ==
=== Background ===
The holiday was established in the USSR by a decree of the Presidium of the Supreme Soviet on 11 July 1946 to commemorate the role of the mechanized and armored forces in the Red Army in defeating their enemy counterparts from the Wehrmacht during the Great Patriotic War. It was, from 1946 to 1980, celebrated on 11 September, which honors the East Carpathian Strategic Offensive.

=== Cold War era ===
On the first celebration that year, a military parade of armored equipment was held on Red Square in the presence of the military leadership on Lenin's Mausoleum and spectators from the adjacent stands, with the personnel being drawn from the 4th Guards Tank Division to participate in the 3-hour parade. Its troops were concentrated on Gorky Street (now Tverskaya Street) from Okhotny Ryad to Mayakovsky Square. After the parade, it was discovered that St. Basil's Cathedral was damaged due to strong, though minor, vibration.

In the 40s and 50s, celebrations included columns of tanks being driven on streets in major Soviet cities watched by enthusiastic crowds.

=== Official status and modern celebrations ===
In 1980, a decree by the Supreme Soviet gave a new procedure for the celebration was established. The procedure required that the holiday not have a fixed date and it should be celebrated on the second Sunday of September from that year onwards. In 2006, it was re-approved by President Vladimir Putin. It has been celebrated on that day ever since as a day of celebration for the servicemen of armored units. It is one of the most revered holidays in the Russian Ground Forces today. It is still celebrated outside of Russia by the Belarusian Ground Forces and the Ukrainian Ground Forces (with Ukrainian specifications). Ukraine has marked it on 9 September since 29 August 1997 when with was created by the decree of President Leonid Kuchma.

== See also ==
- Border Guards Day
- Navy Day
- Paratroopers' Day
