= 1st Tank Brigade (Soviet Union) =

Soviet tank brigade in World War II

- Active: 1941–1942
- Country: Soviet Union
- Branch: Soviet Army
- Type: Armored
- Engagements: World War II

The 1st Tank Brigade was a Soviet tank brigade taking a part in World War II. The brigade was in the lines during 18 September 1941 to 16 February 1942.

== History ==
The 1st Tank Brigade was formed 14 September 1941 in Kosteryovo on the basis of the disbanded 32nd and 34th Tank Divisions. At the time of formation there were in the brigade 7 KV-1, 22 T-34 and 32 T-40 with 1 847 of personnel assets. 15th September, 1941 the brigade departed by railway to Okhtyrka and 21 September 1941 concentrated in 20 km southeastward Romny. September 21 to October 25 the brigade had fought retiring from Romny to Belgorod. October 26 to December, 17 the brigade had been restored in the reserve. December, 18 the brigade had been deployed to Kastornoye and December, 20 to January, 2 the brigade had advanced from Kastornoye to Shchigry. January, 3 to January, 15 the brigade was in reserve and January, 16 reopened offensive to Shchigry. The offensive was continued to 11 February 1942 and then the brigade taken on the defensive.

On 16 February 1942 the brigade was retitled to 6th Guards Tank Brigade for distinguished conduct under fire. By Order No. 0041ss of the State Defence Committee (NKO) of August 28, 1944 the 6th separate Guards "Sivash" Red Banner Brigade was re-formed into the Gvardeye Sivash Red Banner Tank School with the location of the city of Nikopol, in the Kharkov Military District. The school appears to have been disestablished in 1947.

== Order of battle ==
Since 14 September 1941:

- Staff;
- Staff company;
- Reconnaissance company;
- 1st Tank Regiment (two battalions);
- Motorized rifle-machinegun battalion;
- Air-defence battalion;
- Repair company;
- Motor transport company;
- Medical platoon

Since December, 1941:

- Staff;
- Staff company;
- Reconnaissance company;
- 1st Tank Battalion;
- 2nd Tank Battalion;
- Motorized rifle-machinegun battalion;
- Repair company;
- Motor transport company;
- Medical platoon

== Unit Relation ==
- 9.14.1941 — 12.19.1941: 21st Army, Southwestern Front
- 12.20.1941 — 1.16.1942: 40th Army, Southwestern Front
- 1.16.1942 — 2.16.1942: Southwestern Front

== References and notes ==
- Boevoi sostav Sovetskoi armii, chast' 1 (iiun'-dekabr' 1941 goda) [The combat composition of the Soviet Army, part 1 (June–December 1941)]. Moscow: Voroshilov Academy of the General Staff, 1963. Classified secret.
- Boevoi sostav Sovetskoi armii, chast' 2 (ianvar'-dekabr' 1942 goda) [The combat composition of the Soviet Army, part 2 (January–December 1942)].Moscow: Voenizdat, 1966. Classified secret.
- V.I. Feskov, et al. The Soviet Army in the Years of the Cold War: 1945–91, Tomsk: Tomsk University Publishing House, 2004.
- Pokrovsky, Alexander (1956). "Перечень № 7. XXI. Управления танковых бригад бригад" [List (Perechen) No. 7 Part IX. Tank Brigades] (in Russian). Moscow: Voenizdat. Archived from the original on 6 October 2019.
- Коломиец М., Мощанский И. Танки Ленд-Лиза. – М.: Экспринт, 2000.
- Коломиец М. В., Галушко А. Бои за Харьков в мае 1942 г.//Фронтовая иллюстрация 2000. № 6.
- М. Коломиец, А. Смирнов. Бои в излучине Дона. 28 июня – 23 июля 1942 года.//Фронтовая иллюстрация 2002. № 6. М.: Издательство «Стратегия КМ», 2002.
- В. И. Егоров. Гвардейская Сивашская. Боевой путь 6-й Гвардейской Краснознаменной Сивашской отдельной танковой бригады, СП/б, 1991.
- О. Шеин. Неизвестный фронт Великой Отечественной. Кровавая баня в калмыцких степях. М., 2009.
- Гвардейские танковые бригады. Боевой состав и боевая деятельность за 1941-1945 гг. в Великой Отечественной войне. Часть XIV (с 1 гв. тбр по 10 гв. тбр включительно).
