= Battalion tactical group =

Russian military formation-type

A battalion tactical group (Russian: Батальонная тактическая группа, batal'onnaya takticheskaya gruppa), abbreviated as BTG, is a combined-arms manoeuvre unit deployed by the Russian Army that is kept at a high level of readiness. A BTG typically comprises a battalion (typically mechanised infantry) of two to four companies reinforced with air-defence, artillery, engineering, and logistical support units, formed from a garrisoned army brigade. A tank company and rocket artillery typically reinforce such groupings. BTGs formed the mainstay of Russia's military intervention in Ukraine from 2013 to 2015, particularly in the war in Donbas.

In August 2021, Russia's defence minister said the country had about 170 BTGs. Each BTG has approximately 600–800 officers and soldiers, of whom roughly 200 are infantrymen, equipped with vehicles typically including roughly 10 tanks and 40 infantry fighting vehicles.

== History ==
=== The Soviet period ===
During the Cold War, the Soviet Army structured its tactical formations with the maneuver regiment as the smallest combined arms force and its subordinate battalions as "pure" tank or motorized rifle formations. In practice, the Soviets reinforced their battalions into temporary combined arms groupings during field exercises. Depending on the assigned mission, a battalion could receive additional tanks or motorized rifle infantry, plus supporting elements like artillery, air defense, engineers, or reconnaissance units. For example, a tank battalion might be reinforced with an infantry company, an artillery battalion, and an engineer platoon to transform it into a combined arms force.

Soviet military writers used the term "tactical group" to describe NATO combined arms formations, with "company tactical groups" to describe company teams and "battalion tactical groups" for battalion task forces. By 1987, "battalion tactical group" was used to describe Soviet combined arms battalions. Battalion tactical groups were seen in the Soviet–Afghan War.

The Soviets expanded the combined arms battalion concept as part of the "Army 2000" restructuring plan to make the army more agile and versatile for future war. One element of this plan was "Division 87", which called for the permanent addition of a tank company to every motorized rifle battalion to turn them into a precursor for a larger and more flexible combined arms battalion.

However, the permanent combined arms battalion experiment was abandoned. They were too expensive for the decaying Soviet economy to reorganize and maintain by the end of the 1980s. The switch to a defensive military strategy under Soviet leader Mikhail Gorbachev rendered large-scale army reforms politically unacceptable. Junior battalion commanders also lacked the experience to handle such complicated formations until later in their command assignments. Further tactical reform would have required the Soviets to abandon simple battle drills and introduce more sophisticated combat techniques down to the company and platoon level, which was only possible with a body of professional non-commissioned officers.

=== Chechen and Georgian wars ===
Following the dissolution of the Soviet Union and the creation of the Russian Armed Forces to replace the Soviet Armed Forces, ad-hoc battalion tactical groups were formed in the Russian Ground Forces as an expediency due to lack of manpower and equipment to field full-strength brigades and divisions during both the first and second Chechen Wars, and also in the 2008 Russo-Georgian War.

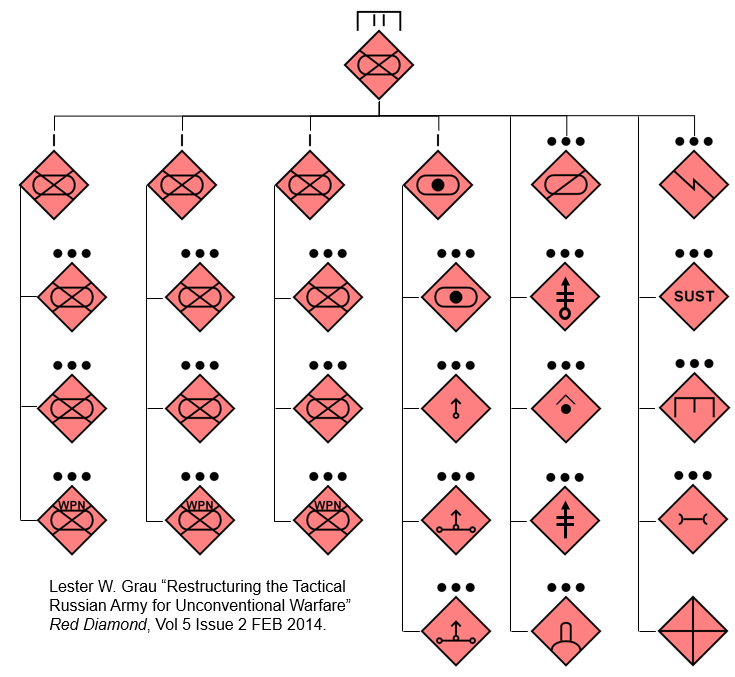
Standard Russian BTG structure

Following the Georgian War, in October 2008, the Ministry of Defence announced that it intended to reform the Russian army by creating "permanent readiness" brigades, which led to the 2008 Russian military reform. After Anatoliy Serdyukov was dismissed as defence minister and replaced by Sergei Shoigu in November 2012, this plan was shelved in favour of forming "permanent readiness" BTGs within garrison brigades. These were planned to be 100% staffed by contract soldiers (i.e., non-conscript volunteers). According to sources quoted by the Russian Interfax agency, the reason for this was lack of manpower to form full-strength brigades.

=== Russo-Ukrainian War ===
Reports from the Russia-Ukraine conflict cited in the July–September 2016 edition of the US military journal Armor identified BTGs as the majority of Russian units deployed there. These BTGs comprised a tank company, three mechanised infantry companies, two anti-tank companies, two or three artillery batteries, and two air-defence batteries. The majority of BTGs deployed in the Donbas war came from Russia's 49th Army and 6th Tank Brigade, though BTGs were deployed from nearly every field army and corps in the Russian Army. BTGs typically composed roughly half of the equipment and personnel of the deploying brigade. BTG personnel typically only includes "contract" soldiers.

Following the War in Donbas, in 2016 the Russian Chief of the General Staff Valery Gerasimov announced plans to expand the number of BTGs from 96 to 125 by 2018. Gerasimov claimed that BTGs would be primarily staffed by contract soldiers by 2018. In September 2018 Gerasimov claimed that Russia had 126 "permanently battle-ready" BTGs. In March 2019, Shoigu, addressing the lower house of the Russian Duma, claimed that Russia had 136 BTGs. In August 2021 Shoigu claimed that Russia had around 170 BTGs.

During the March–April 2021 escalation in tensions between Russia and Ukraine, US officials estimated that around 48 of Russia's BTGs had moved to the border with Ukraine. Ukrainian officials estimated that 56 BTGs would be moved to the border. During the tensions on the border between Russia and Ukraine in late 2021 US officials estimated that the Russian deployment opposite Ukraine would reach 100 BTGs by January 2022, with around 50 BTGs estimated as already being in place by December 2021.

During the 2022 Russian invasion of Ukraine BTGs were initially the main fighting units, seeing action in the Siege of Mariupol, the Battle of Donetsk Airport and the Battle of Debaltseve. The UK Ministry of Defence observed that from September to November 2022, Russian forces had largely stopped deploying BTGs, noting their intrinsic weaknesses. BTGs lacked sufficient infantry and artillery support to be able to advance properly on the narrow axes of advance that they were given.

== Advantages and disadvantages ==
The combination of different weapons systems including heavy ones at a low organisational level allows heavy artillery bombardments to be laid on more easily and makes them available for use tactically. As such, a BTG can engage opposing units out to a longer range than, for example, a US Brigade Combat Team (BCT), which does not have heavy weapons devolved down to it. Up to two BTGs can compose a brigade in the Russian army. Divisions and regiments have been superseded by brigades.

However, the basic BTG's relative lack of manpower (they deploy with about 200 infantrymen) means it is not designed to hold ground but to continually inflict casualties while remaining mobile. This makes it reliant upon Marines, VDV and other troops such as paramilitaries (pro-Russian militias in the War in Donbas) to hold ground or provide security along the flanks and rear.

By Russian law, conscripts are not allowed to serve in BTGs outside of Russia. Outside of Russia, the troops of a BTG serve on a volunteer basis. The limited manpower of the BTG makes the commanders less likely to engage in urban combat than a BCT commander. As they derive their manpower and equipment primarily through the cannibalisation of a larger unit, their sustainability in long-term operations is also in doubt.

According to the military analyst and historian Michael Kofman, BTGs represented a form of force-generation that was unsuited for sustained combat. BTGs were instead intended for short-duration, small-scale, local conflicts where they might be deployed for between three and ten days, and lacked the logistical support for longer-term engagement. For this reason, in the long-term and large-scale combat of the Russia-Ukraine war, BTGs proved brittle, being unable to continue operations if initial engagements were unsuccessful.

== See also ==
- Battlegroup (army)
- Task force
