= Chupakhivka =

Rural locality in Sumy Oblast, Ukraine

Chupakhivka Чупахівка
- Rural settlement
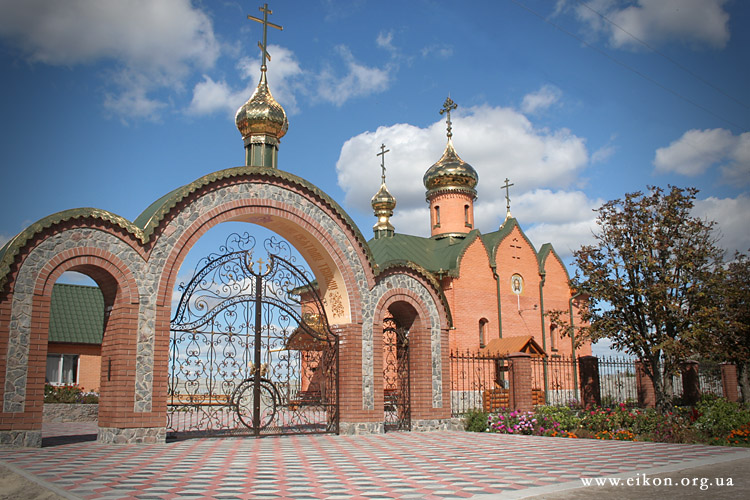
- Church of the Holy Cross

- Location in Sumy Oblast Location in Ukraine
- Country: Ukraine
- Oblast: Sumy Oblast
- Raion: Okhtyrka Raion
- Hromada: Chupakhivka settlement hromada

Population (2022)
  - Total: 2,164
- Time zone: UTC+2 (EET)
  - Summer (DST): UTC+3 (EEST)

Chupakhivka (Ukrainian: Чупахівка, Russian: Чупаховка) is a rural settlement in Okhtyrka Raion of Sumy Oblast in Ukraine. It is located on the banks of the Tashan in the drainage basin of the Dnieper. Chupakhivka hosts the administration of Chupakhivka settlement hromada, one of the hromadas of Ukraine. Population: 2,164 (2022 estimate).

Until 26 January 2024, Chupakhivka was designated urban-type settlement. On this day, a new law entered into force which abolished this status, and Chupakhivka became a rural settlement.

== Economy ==
=== Transportation ===
The closest railway station, approximately 15 kilometres (9.3 mi) southeast, is Okhtyrka. This is a terminal station with infrequent passenger traffic.

Chupakhivka is connected by road with Okhtyrka and Lebedyn.
