= Main Directorate of Combat Training and Service of Troops of the Russian Armed Forces =

Main Directorate of Combat Training and Service of Troops
- Главное управление боевой подготовки и службы войск ВС РФ; Glavnoye upravleniye boyevoy podgotovki sluzhby voysk
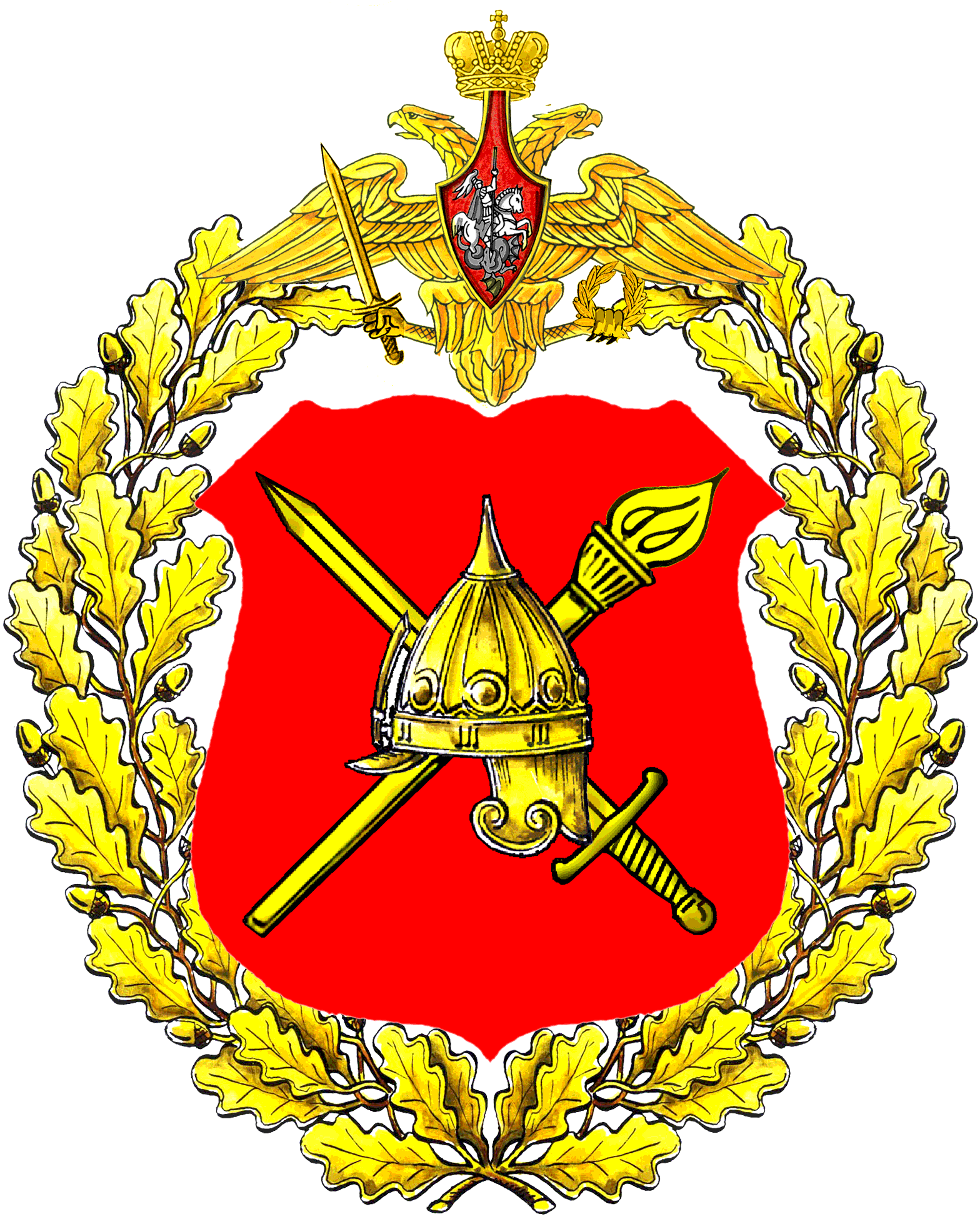
- Emblem of the Directorate

Agency overview
- Formed: 4 April 1921; 105 years ago
- Headquarters: Main Building of the Ministry of Defense, Moscow
- Employees: Classified
- Annual budget: Classified
- Agency executive: Director
- Parent agency: Ministry of Defense
- Website: Ministry of Defense Website

The Main Directorate of Combat Training and Service of Troops of the Russian Armed Forces (Russian: Главное управление боевой подготовки и службы войск ВС РФ) is a department of the Ministry of Defense of the Russian Federation. The directorate is responsible for organizing combat training of troops, as well as to coordinate the activities of military command and control bodies in training junior specialists in the Russian Armed Forces.

== History ==
During the times of the Imperial Russian Army, priority in matters of combat training was given to commanders of military districts, heads of formations, and commanders of military units.

On April 4, 1921, for the first time, combat training agencies received a comprehensive system capable of centralized management of military training and education. This made it possible to create a system of troop training, improve it based on combat experience, and implement methodological guidance.

During the Great Patriotic War, the directorate solved the most important tasks of preparation of spare parts and marching formations, inspection of newly created units and formations.

In the post-war period, the Main Directorate, as a military command body, was repeatedly reformed. This was largely due to changes in approaches to the nature and methods of waging wars, the restructuring of the Soviet Armed Forces, and changes in the technical equipment of the troops.

On December 1, 2010, as part of the major military reforms, the Main Directorate for Combat Training of the Ground Forces of the Russian Federation was disbanded, and its functions for organizing inter-service training in the army and navy were transferred directly to the General Staff of the Russian Armed Forces. At the same time, operational training and combat training were not combined within a single body of the central apparatus of the Ministry of Defense. Operational training was organized by the Operational Training Directorate of the General Staff of the Armed Forces, and combat training by the Main Directorate for Combat Training of the Ground Forces.

In November 2012, the Minister of Defense Sergei Shoygu ordered to re-establish the Main Directorate of Combat Training and Service of Troops. It is since then headed by Ivan Buvaltsev.

In the period from 2013 to 2020, interspecific training grounds and combat training centers equipped with modern equipment and simulators, as well as an Arctic training center, were created. In 2019 of the position of Deputy Minister of Defense of the Russian Federation for combat training of the Armed Forces was restored.
