= Main Operational Directorate of the General Staff of the Russian Armed Forces =

Russian military staff organisation

- Главное оперативное управление Генерального штаба Вооружённых сил Российской Федерации; Glavnoye operativnoye upravleniye General'nogo shtaba Vooruzhonnykh sil Rossiyskoy Federatsii
- Emblem of the Main Operational Directorate

Agency overview
- Formed: 1939; 87 years ago
- Headquarters: General Staff Building, Moscow
- Employees: Classified
- Annual budget: Classified
- Agency executive: Sergey Rudskoy, Director
- Parent agency: General Staff of the Armed Forces of the Russian Federation
- Website: Ministry of Defense Website

The Main Operational Directorate of the General Staff of the Russian Armed Forces (Russian: Главное оперативное управление Генерального штаба Вооружённых сил Российской Федерации; official abbreviation GOU GSh VS RF Russian: ГОУ ГШ ВС РФ) is the main body of the General Staff of the Russian Armed Forces, whose tasks include planning military operations at various levels. Its role in the system of combat command and control of the Armed Forces is traditionally so great that it is often people from the GOU who occupy the post of Chief of the General Staff, as was the case, in particular, with Generals Anatoly Kvashnin and Yuri Baluyevsky.

== History ==
The Operational Directorate of the General Staff was established on the basis of the 1st (Operations) Department in October 1939 and immediately became the leading working body of the General Staff. During the Great Patriotic War, the Operations Directorate provided reliable leadership of the active fronts. Its structure changed significantly in 1941 and in 1943, after a number of small changes in 1943 it remained unchanged until the end of the war.

In March 1946, the department was upgraded in status and became known as the Main Operational Directorate of the General Staff. From that time on, for decades to come it acquired the role of the leading troop command and control authority in peacetime and wartime. As a rule, now the chiefs of the GOU simultaneously became deputy chiefs of the General Staff.

On January 24, 2013, President of Russia Vladimir Putin approved the Defense Plan of the Russian Federation. Such a document has been developed for the first time in the history of Russia. It brought together almost all documents on preparation for the armed defense of Russia. At the same time, the State Educational Institution was tasked with developing the main documents of the Defense Plan and coordinating the joint activities of 49 federal ministries and departments participating in its creation.

== Role ==
Main activities of the directorate:

- Participation in identifying the sources of military threats to Russia's security and preparing proposals to the military-political leadership of the state on issues of military development;
- Organizing the development of the Defense Plan of the Russian Federation;
- Determining the main directions of construction of the Russian Armed Forces, coordinating the development of plans for the construction *Of other troops, military formations and bodies;
- Strategic and operational planning for the use of the Russian Armed Forces;
- Operational control of troops in peacetime and wartime;
- Organization of interaction between the Russian Armed Forces and federal executive authorities, which include other troops, military formations and bodies;
- Organization and control of the implementation of anti-terrorist activities in the Russian Armed Forces;
- Control of operational training activities of the Russian Armed Forces;
- Operational support of military cooperation events in the CSTO, CIS and SCO formats, meetings of their statutory bodies;
- participation in the formation of proposals for the draft State Armament Program.

== Chiefs ==
- Leonty Kuznetsov (1991–1992)
- Viktor Barynkin (1992–1996)
- Leonid Zolotov (1996–1997)
- Yuri Baluyevsky (1997–2001)
- Aleksandr Rukshin (2001–2008)
- Sergey Surovikin (2008–2010)
- Andrey Tretyak (2010–2011)
- Vladimir Zarudnitsky (2011–2014)
- Andrey Kartapolov (2014–2015)
- Sergey Rudskoy (2015–present)
