= Nikolai Bogdanovsky =

Russian general (born 1957)

- Николай Васильевич Богдановский
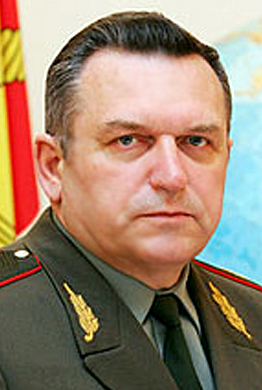
- Bogdanovsky in 2009
- Born: Nikolai Vasilyevich Bogdanovsky; 18 February 1957 (age 69); Predgorny, Altai Krai, Soviet Union
- Military career
- Allegiance: Soviet Union (to 1991); Russia
- Branch: Soviet Army; Russian Ground Forces
- Service years: 1982–present
- Rank: Colonel general
- Commands: Central Military District (2012-2014)
- Conflicts: Russo-Ukrainian War; Syrian Civil War

Nikolai Vasilyevich Bogdanovsky (Russian: Николай Васильевич Богдановский; born on 17 January 1957) is a Russian Ground Forces colonel general who has been the First Deputy Chief of the General Staff of the Armed Forces of the Russian Federation since 12 June 2014. He commanded the Central Military District from 2012 to 2014, was the Deputy Commander-in-Chief of the Russian Ground Forces for Combat Training from 2011 to 2012, commanded the Leningrad Military District from 2009 to 2011, and was the Chief of the Main Staff and First Deputy Commander-in-Chief of the Russian Ground Forces from 2008 to 2009.

== Biography ==
Nikolay Bogdanovsky was born on 17 January 1957.

He graduated from the Yekaterinburg Suvorov Military School between 1972 and 1974, and the Moscow Higher Military Command School named after the Supreme Soviet of the RSFSR between 1974 and 1978.

Bogdanovsky joined the Soviet Army in 1978, and served as a reconnaissance platoon commander, company commander, chief of staff of a motorized rifle battalion, commander of a motorized rifle (tank) battalion in the Southern Group of Forces in Hungary between 1978 and 1984.

He also graduated from the Frunze Military Academy between 1984 and 1987.

Between 1987 and 1994, he was the chief of staff of a fortified area (UR), commander of a motorized rifle regiment, chief of staff of a motorized rifle division.

He also graduated from the Military Academy of the General Staff of the Armed Forces between 1994 and 1996.

Between 1996 and 2006, Bogdanovsky was the Chief of the 392nd Pacific Center for Training Junior Specialists of Motorized Rifle Forces, and the Chief of Staff and Commander of the 35th Army. On 12 December 2004 he was awarded the rank of Lieutenant General.

From June 2006 to January 2008, Bogdanovsky was the Deputy Commander of the Far Eastern Military District.

From January 2008 to March 2009, he was the Chief of the General Staff of the Ground Forces, the 1st Deputy Commander-in-Chief of the Ground Forces.

From 24 March 2009 to 9 January 2011, Bogdanovsky became the Commander of the Leningrad Military District. By the decree of the President of the Russia on 9 January 2011, he was appointed Deputy Commander-in-Chief of the Ground Forces for combat training.

On 13 December 2012 he was awarded the rank of Colonel General.

From 24 December 2012 to 12 June 2014, Bogdanovsky became the commander of the Central Military District.

By the Decree of the President of the Russia of 12 June 2014, he was appointed First Deputy Chief of the General Staff of the Armed Forces of Russia. This position was restored after having been temporarily abolished since March 2010.

In connection with the events in Ukraine, between August and September 2014, Bogdanovsky was included in the sanctions list initiated by Canada

He took part in negotiations on coordination of actions with the Israel Defense Forces between 29 September and 1 October 2015 during the Russian military intervention in Syria.

He was sanctioned by the UK government in 2022 in relation to the Russo-Ukrainian War.

Military offices
| Preceded by Oleg Salyukov | Commander of the 35th Army; 2003–2006 | Succeeded by Igor Turchenyuk |
| Preceded by Aleksandr Morozov | Chief of the Main Staff and First Deputy Commander-in-Chief of the Russian Ground Forces; 2008–2009 | Succeeded by Sergey Skokov |
| Preceded by Valery Gerasimov | Commander of the Leningrad Military District; 2009–2011 | District abolished |
| Preceded by Aleksandr Dvornikov | Commander of the Central Military District; 2012–2014 | Succeeded by Vladimir Zarudnitsky |
| Vacant Title last held by Aleksandr Burutin | First Deputy Chief of the General Staff of the Armed Forces; 2014–present | Incumbent |
