= 1st Guards Army =

Soviet army unit

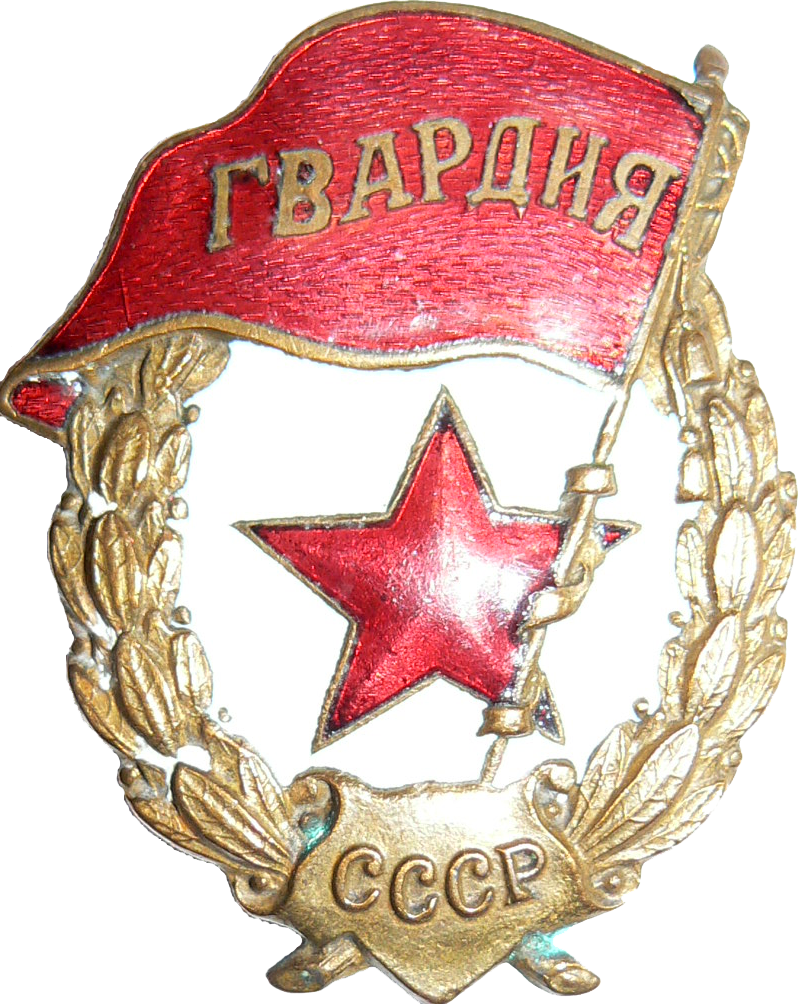
- Soviet Guards insignia
- Active: August–October 1942; November–December 1942; December 1942 – August 1945; 1967–1992
- Country: Soviet Union
- Branch: Red Army (Soviet Army from 1946)
- Type: Field army
- Part of: Kiev Military District; 1st Ukrainian Front
- Garrison/HQ: Chernigov (1967–1992)
- Engagements: World War II: Stalingrad
- Decorations: Order of Lenin

Commanders
- Notable commanders: Andrei Grechko; Dmitry Lelyushenko

The 1st Guards Army was a Soviet Guards field army that fought on the Eastern Front during World War II.

== First Formation ==
On August 6, 1942, the army formed from the 2nd Reserve Army with five Guards Rifle Divisions, the 37th, 38th, 39th, 40th and 41st. On August 9, the army was incorporated into Southeastern Front. On August 18, it was transferred to the Stalingrad Front (renamed Don Front on September 30).

During the German Sixth Army's assault on Stalingrad in August 1942, the Red Army launched a counter-offensive to drive the German forces back. The 1st Guards Army and the 24th Army launched the attack. Little success was met. The 1st Guards Army managed an advance of just a few miles, while the 24th Army was pushed back right into its start-line.

On October 16, 1942, the headquarters of the army transferred into Stavka reserve and its troops transferred to the 24th Army. On 25 October 1942 the army was disbanded, its headquarters was converted to the field management of the 2nd formation of Southwestern Front according to the Stavka directive of 22 October 1942.

=== Commanders ===
- Lieutenant General Filipp Ivanovich Golikov (August 1942)
- Guard Major General Artillery Kirill Semenovich Moskalenko (August–October 1942)
- Guard Major General Ivan Mikhailovich Chistyakov (October 1942)

== Second Formation ==
On November 5, 1942, 1st Guards Army was reformed from 63rd Army according to the Stavka directive of November 1. The army was a part of Southwestern Front. When the German troops were making their attack on Stalingrad, the First Guards Army was facing the Italian Eighth Army in the upper part of the Don River. The Army participated in Stalingrad strategic offensive Operation Uranus. As the right flank of the front shock group, 1st Guards Army with 5th Tank Army created the appearance of the Stalingrad encirclement "boiler".

On December 5, 1942, 1st Guards Army is split, its left wing being renamed 3rd Guards Army of the Southwestern Front.

=== Commander ===
- Lieutenant General Dmitri Danilovich Lelyushenko (November–December 1942)

== Third Formation ==
The 1st Guards Army was created on December 8, 1942, according to the Stavka directive of December 5, 1942. The troops of the army was formed from the part of the operational group of Southwestern Front, and the headquarters of the army formed of management of 4th Army Reserve. It is composed of units of the right wing of the previous version of the 1st Guards Army and some reinforcement units : the 4th Guards Rifle Corps, the 6th Guards Rifle Corps, the 153rd Rifle Division, and the 18th Tank Corps. After the German relief operation was held, the 1st Guards Army, along with the 6th Army and 3rd Guards Army, launched an attack in Operation Little Saturn. During the operation the Soviets defeated the Italian Eighth Army and gained a respectable amount of territory. By the end of the year, the 1st Guards Army was outside Millerovo.

The 1st Guards Army also took part in Operation Saturn, where the Red Army successfully drove back Army Group South to the Donbas in Ukraine. The 1st Guards Army was part of the Soviet Southwestern Front, and took part in the victorious Soviet pushing into Germany in 1943 to 1945. Also, in 1943, the 1st Guards Army was the first unit of the soviet army to operate the new T-34/85 tank. Among its units when the war ended in 1945 was the 81st Rifle Division. In August, the 1st Guards Army became the headquarters of the Kiev Military District.

=== Commanders ===
- Lieutenant-General, and from May 1943, Colonel-General Vasily Ivanovich Kuznetsov (December 1942 – December 1943)
- Colonel-General Andrei Antonovich Grechko (December 1943 – the end of the war)

== After World War II ==
The 98th Anti-Aircraft Artillery Brigade was expanded into the 86th Anti-Aircraft Artillery Division on 22 August 1956, stationed at Constanța. The Special Mechanized Army became the 1st Separate Combined Arms Army in 1957, and in July 1958 withdrew from Romania to the Kiev Military District. When air defense units were reorganized on 30 July 1960 due to the replacement of anti-aircraft guns by surface-to-air missiles, the division was reorganized as the 108th Anti-Aircraft Rocket Brigade of the 1st Separate Army, a unit of the Air Defense of the Ground Forces.

In July 1958, the army was moved from its headquarters in Budapest to Chernigov and renamed the 1st Combined Arms Army. The 108th AA Rocket Brigade was based at Zolotonosha as the air defense brigade of the army for the rest of the Cold War

In 1960 the army consisted of the 72nd, 81st and 115th Guards Motor Rifle Divisions, as well as the 35th Guards Tank Division. On 5 October 1967, it was renamed the 1st Guards Combined Arms Army at the request of now-Minister of Defense Grechko, who had commanded the army's third formation during World War II. On 22 February 1968, it was awarded the Order of the Red Banner. For a period the army HQ was actually an operations group of the District. By this time it had been awarded the Order of Lenin. It included among its forces the 72nd Guards Motor Rifle Division, and the 25th Guards Motor Rifle Division.

Divisions in 1989	Divisions in 1991–92 (Ukraine)
25th Guards Motor Rifle Division (Lubny)	25th Mechanised Division
47th Motor Rifle Division	Base for Storage of Weapons and Equipment
72nd Guards Motor Rifle Division (Belaya Tserkov)	72nd Mechanised Division
41st Guards Tank Division (Cherkassy)	6298th Guards Base for Storage of Weapons and Equipment
850th Territorial Training Centre (Pyriatyn)	Base for Storage of Weapons and Equipment
851st Territorial Training Centre (Konotop)	Base for Storage of Weapons and Equipment

After the collapse of the Soviet Union the Army leadership pledged allegiance to Ukraine which was formed out of the Soviet union republic, the Ukrainian SSR. In 1992 it was reduced to the 1st Army Corps of the Ukrainian Ground Forces, and then Territorial Directorate "North".

=== Commanders ===
The following officers commanded the 1st Guards Combined Arms Army and the previous 1st Combined Arms Army.

- Lieutenant General Vasily Arkhipov (formation in 23 May 1960)
- Colonel General Alexander Rodimtsev (23 May 1960 – 18 March 1966)
- Lieutenant General Grigory Batalov (18 March 1966 – 13 June 1969)
- Lieutenant General Sergey Molokoedov (13 June 1969 – 2 September 1970)
- Lieutenant General Grigory Gorodetsky (2 September 1970 – 1973)
- ?? (1973–1976)
- Lieutenant General Alexander Elagin (1976 – September 1979)
- Lieutenant General Aleksey Fyodorov (September 1979 – May 1982)
- Lieutenant General Alexey Demidov (May 1982 – April 1985)
- Major General Leonty Kuznetsov (May 1985 – May 1988; promoted major general 16 February 1988)
- Lieutenant General Valentin Bobryshev (May 1988 – 1 August 1991)
- Major General Andrei Nikolayev (1 August 1991 – February 1992)
