= Topographic Service of the Russian Armed Forces =

- Топографическая служба Вооружённых сил Российской Федерации; Topograficheskaya Sluzhba Vooruzhonnykh sil Rossiyskoy Federatsii
- Emblem of the Service

Agency overview
- Formed: 1797; 229 years ago
- Headquarters: Main Building of the Ministry of Defense, Moscow
- Employees: Classified
- Annual budget: Classified
- Agency executive: Director
- Parent agency: General Staff of the Armed Forces of the Russian Federation
- Website: Ministry of Defense Website

The Topographic Service of the General Staff of the Armed Forces of the Russian Federation (Russian: Военно-топографическое служба Генерального штаба Вооружённых сил Российской Федерации) (Russian acronym ТС ВС России) is a formation (special service), special units and enterprises designed to perform geodetic, topographic and cartographic work and provide the forces with topographic maps, geodetic data and other information about the terrain in theaters of military operations.

== History ==
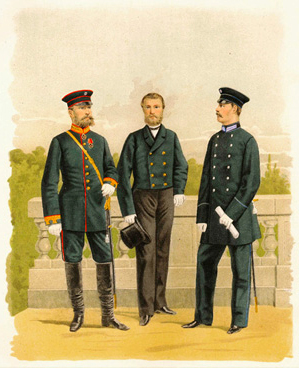
The person at the right side is a military geodetic soldier of the Russian Imperial Army

The origins of the Topographic Service date back to the beginning of the 18th century, when individual officers (or groups) were allocated from the quartermaster units of combined arms headquarters, who were tasked with compiling basic topographic documents (collecting information about the terrain, performing route surveys, etc.).

From 1764 to 1797, a special General Staff, created under the Military Collegium, was engaged in surveying camps, fortifications, routes and creating maps. In 1797, His Imperial Majesty's own Map Depot was created, which marked the beginning of the Military Topographic Depot of the Main (General) Staff of the Russian Army.

In 1812, it was renamed the Military Topographic Depot, which supervised the Corps of Topographers (after 1866, the Corps of Military Topographers) from 1822. This body of the central military administration carried out control functions in terms of publishing maps in imperial Russia, and also supervised the conduct of geodetic, topographic and cartographic work carried out in the interests of the Armed Forces and the state, until 1918. In 1822, the School of Topographers was created in St. Petersburg. Since then, this educational institution has been training topographer specialists.

In the Soviet Armed Forces, the Military Topographic Service was part of the staff service, which had its own bodies in the headquarters of formations and operational associations, as well as special units and institutions (topographic, aerial photo-topographic and geodetic detachments, cartographic factories and units, map warehouses, etc.), which were mainly engaged in the preparation of topographic maps and geodetic data on the territory of probable theaters of military operations (TVD), topographic training of troops and scientific research work in the field of cartography, geodesy and aerial photography. In wartime, the most important task of the Military Topographic Service of the Soviet Armed Forces was to provide topographic support for combat operations of troops.

In 1991, the Military Topographic Service of the Armed Forces of Russia was formed, which in 1992 was transformed into the Topographic Service of the Russian Armed Forces.

Based on the order of the Minister of Defense No. 395 of November 9, 2003 "On establishing the date of the holiday of the Military Topographical Directorate of the General Staff of the Armed Forces of the Russian Federation" and in order to restore the historical traditions of the Topographical Service of the Armed Forces of the Russian Federation, an annual holiday of the Military Topographical Directorate of the General Staff was established - February 8, that is, the day of the transformation of the Map Depot into the Military Topographical Depot in 1812.
