= Predgorny =

Predgorny (masculine), Predgornaya (feminine), or Predgornoye (neuter) may refer to:

- Predgorny District, a district of Stavropol Krai, Russia
- Predgorny (rural locality) (Predgornaya, Predgornoye), name of several rural localities in Russia
