= National Defense Management Center =

Coordinates: 55°44′56″N 37°36′8″E

- Национальный центр управления обороной РФ
- Official Emblem of the center
- Founded: 1 December 2014
- Country: Russian Federation
- Branch: General Staff of the Armed Forces
- Type: Command center
- Role: Provide operational control over the Armed Forces
- Part of: Ministry of Defense
- Headquarters: Frunzenskaya Embankment, 22, Moscow
- Nicknames: "НЦУО", NTsUO (NDMC), (NDCC)
- Engagements: Global War on Terrorism; Russian operation in Syria; Russian invasion of Ukraine

Commanders
- Director: Oleg Gorshenin

The National Defense Management Center (Russian: Национальный центр управления обороной РФ, Natsional'nyi tsentr upravleniya oboronoi RF (НЦУО)) is the supreme command and control center of the Ministry of Defense of Russia and the Armed Forces of the Russian Federation. It was formerly the Central Command Post of the General Staff of the Russian Armed Forces.

Its two primary functions are to provide centralized combat command and control of the Armed Forces and to enable a whole-of-government response to security threats. It is made up of the "Strategic Nuclear Forces Command Centre, which controls the use of nuclear weapons; the Combat Control Centre, which monitors the world military-political situation and the socio-political situation in the Russian Federation, analyzes and forecasts threats, develops ways to respond, and controls the use of the Armed Forces, as well as non-MOD troops and military formations; and the Day-to-day Operations Management Centre, which coordinates the activities of federal authorities to meet the needs of MOD and other troops, military formations, and bodies for defence purposes."

== Function ==
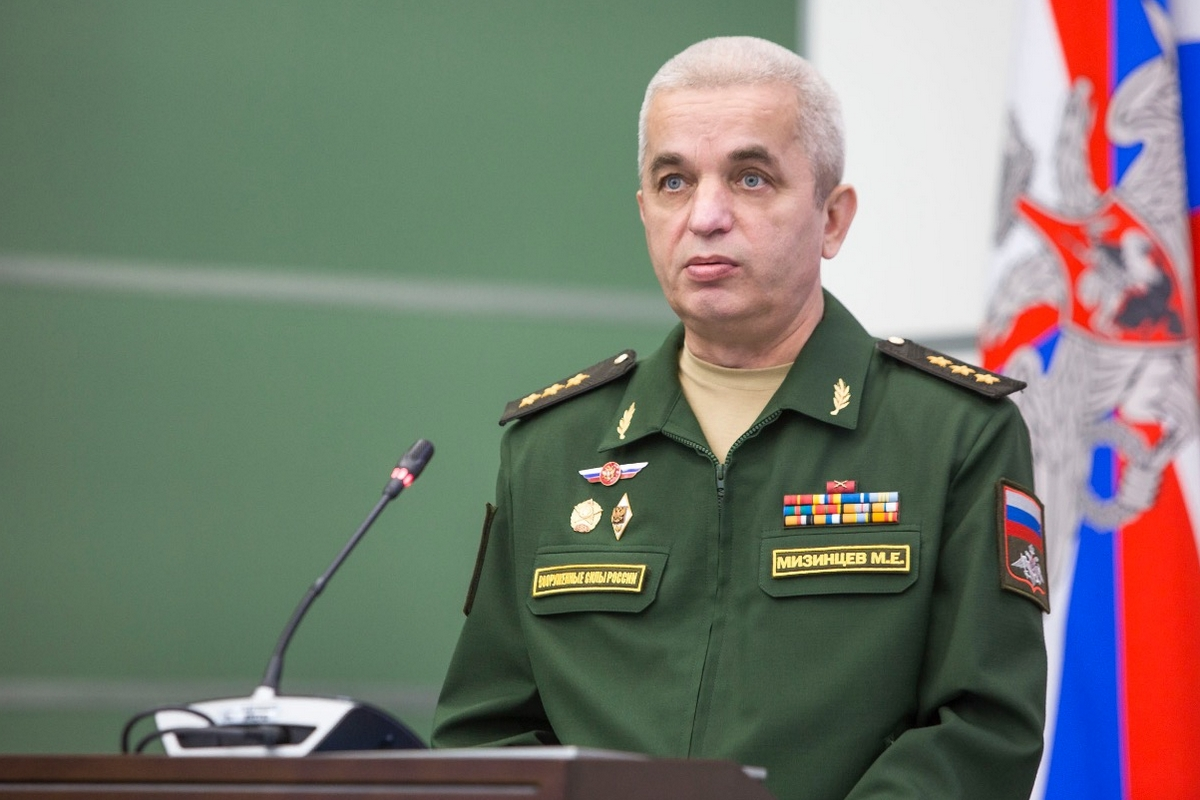
Colonel General Mizintsev and Director of NDMC (2019).

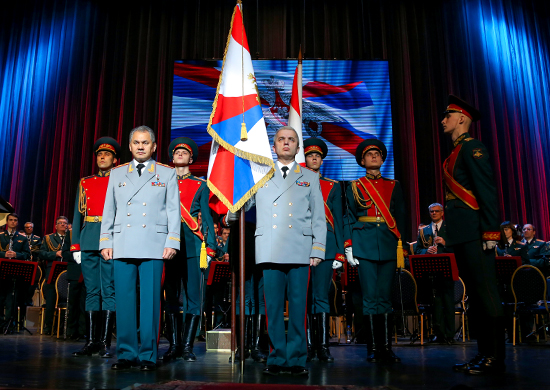
Defense Minister Sergey Shoygu presenting the official banner to Mikhail Mizintsev, 22 December 2014

The center is considered as the second highest authority responsible for the Defense Ministry's management and supervision, after the Minister himself and is directly subordinate to the General Staff of the Armed Forces of the Russian Federation, overseen by the Chief of the General Staff.

It has a powerful military supercomputer called NDMC Supercomputer with a speed of 16 petaflops and storage capacity of 236 petabytes.

The center is located in the Main Building of the Ministry of Defense at Frunzenskaya Embankment, 22, Moscow, Russia.

The computer network of the center is based on the Russian military computer operating system Astra Linux by Rusbitech company, which in 2018 was declared the future ultimate standard for the Army. Modernization with artificial intelligence software is underway.

== National Defense Management Center Head ==
Since its establishment in late 2014, Lieutenant General Mikhail Mizintsev was appointed as the defense center's first director. He was promoted to Colonel General in 2017.

In September 2022, Oleg Gorshenin, former commander of the 154th separate commandant's regiment, was appointed Head of the National Defense Management Center, replacing Mizintsev who was appointed to Deputy Defence Minister.

== Gallery ==
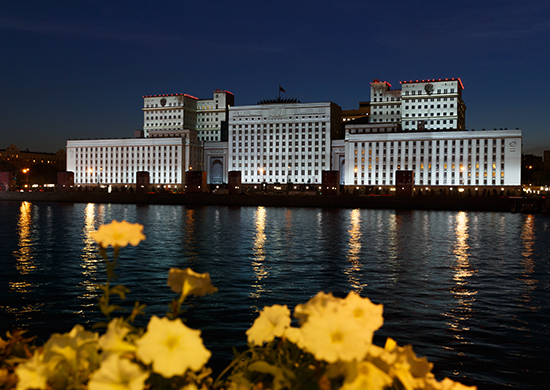
The facade of the National Defense Management Center

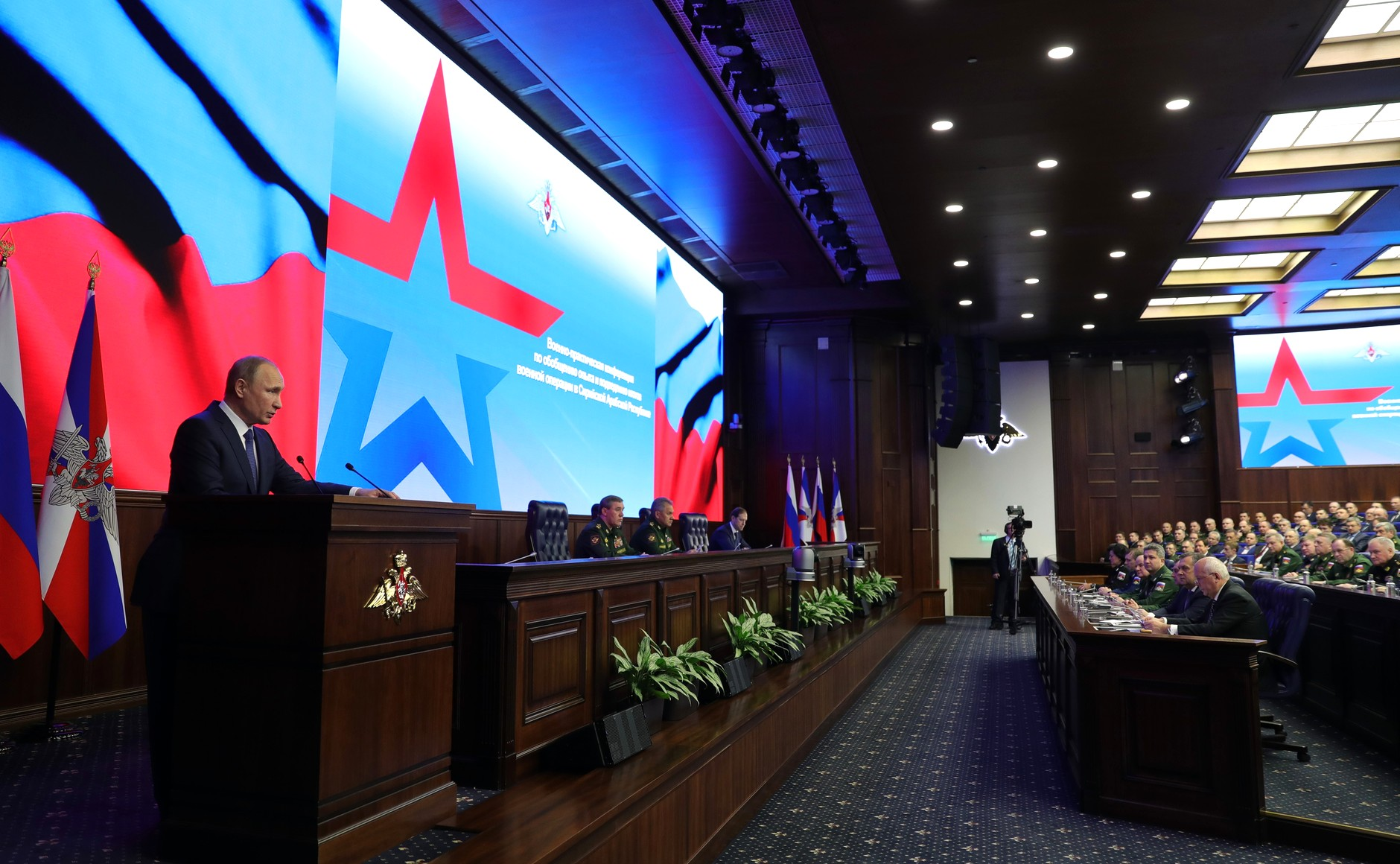
Vladimir Putin in National Defense Management Center

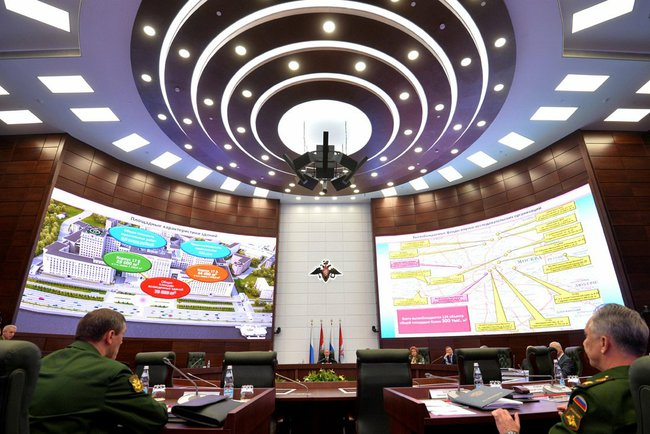
The National Defense Management Center in Moscow

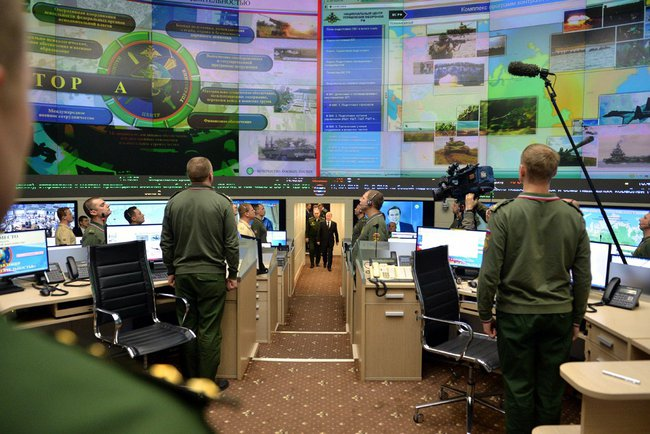
The National Defense Management Center in Moscow (Information hall)

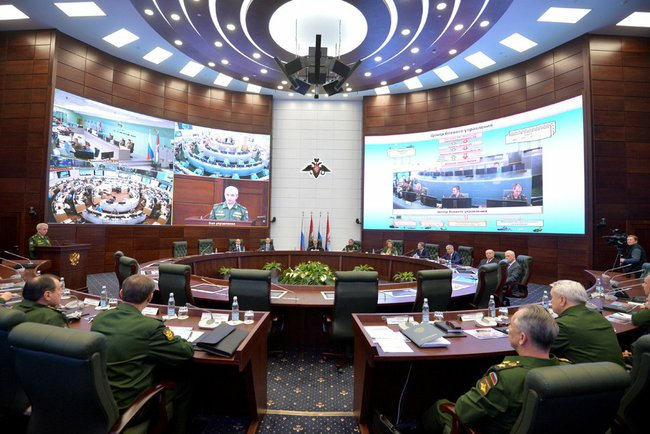
The National Defense Management Center (Control and Interaction Hall)

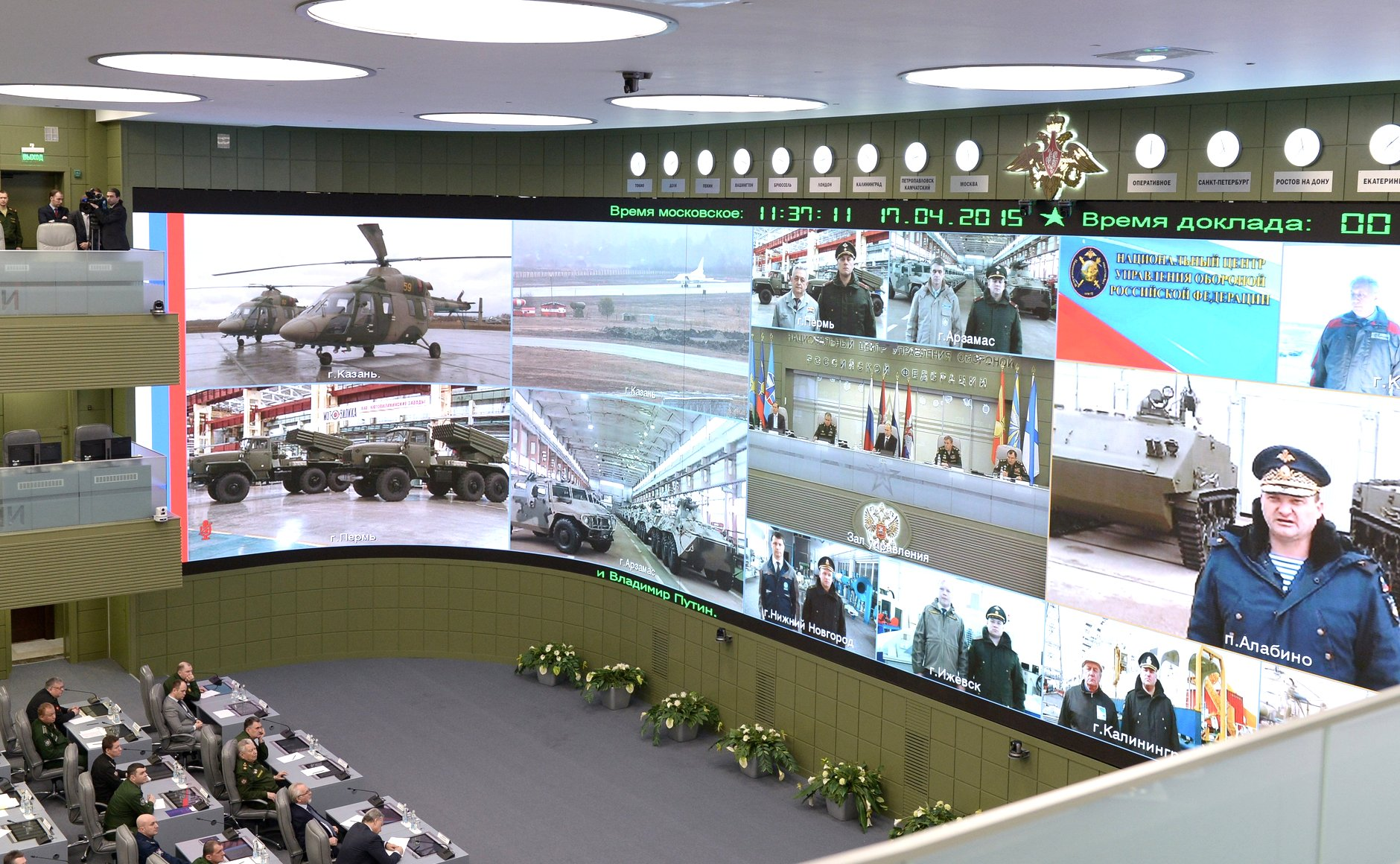
Live briefings from different parts of Russia at the National Defense Management Center

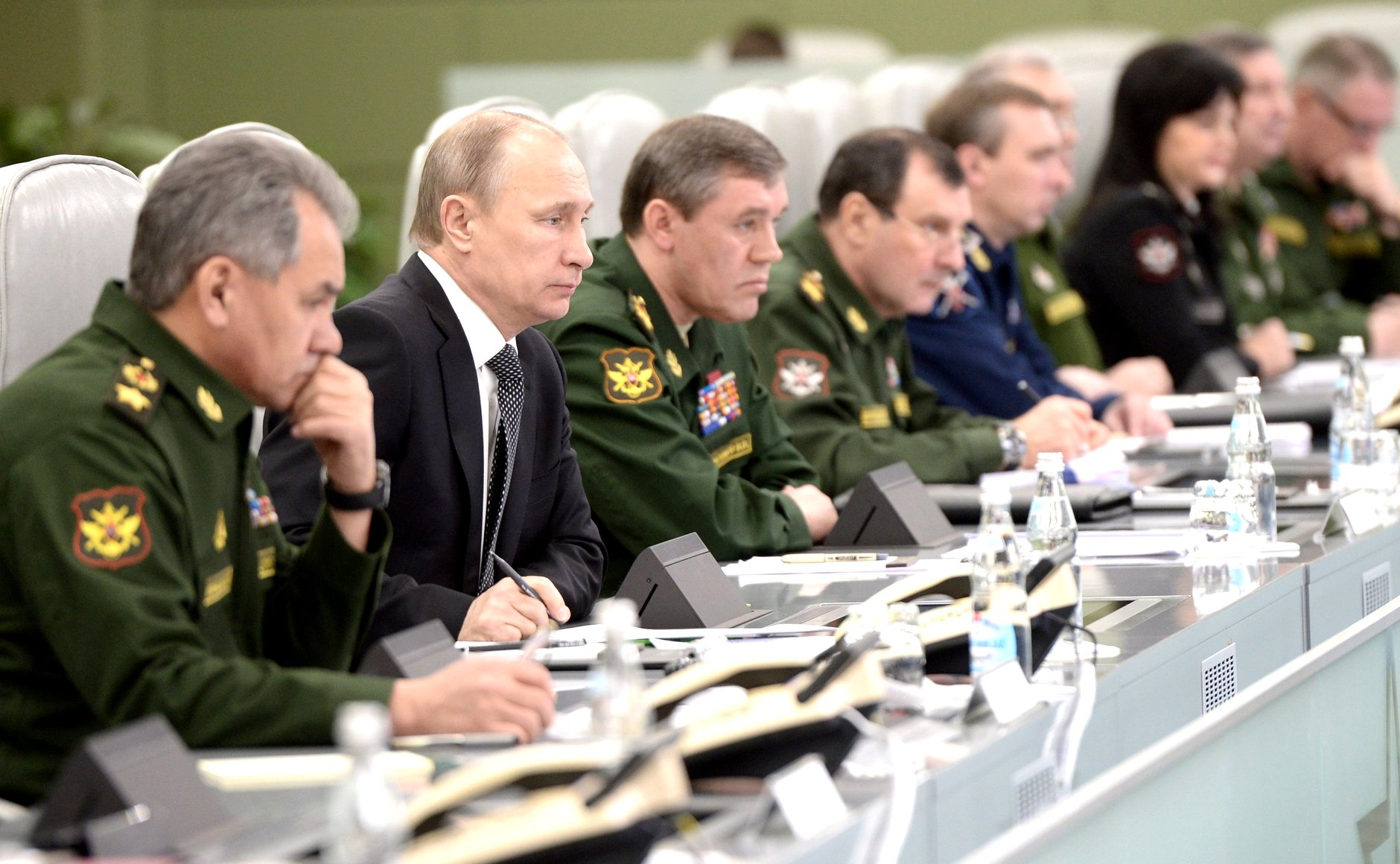
Vladimir Putin with the leadership of the Ministry of Defense and General Staff along with other Russian generals at a meeting in the National Defense Management Center

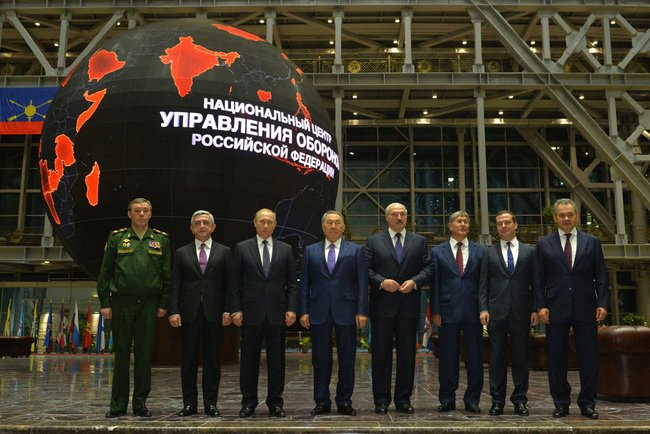
The heads of state of the CSTO member states at the Russian National Defense Management Center, 23 December 2014

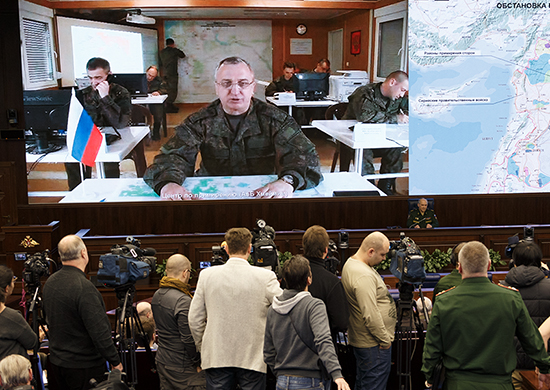
Commander of the Russian Reconciliation Center for Syria Lieutenant General Kuralenko briefs the press at the National Defense Management Center, 27 February 2016

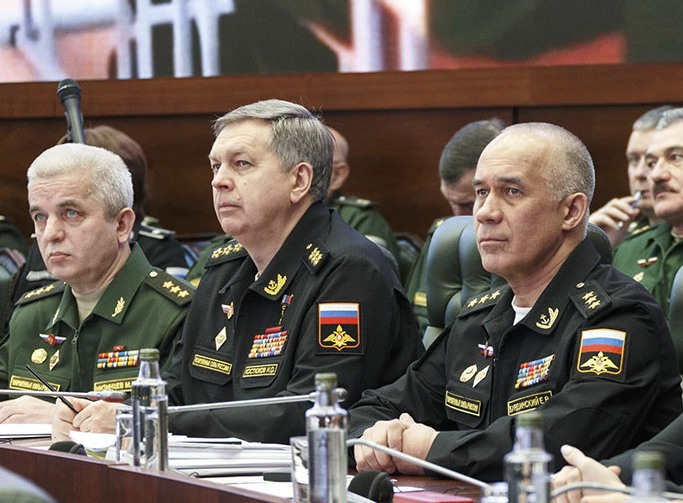
Colonel General Mizintsev (left), Admiral Igor Kostyukov (centre) and Head of Main Organizational-Mobilizational Directorate Colonel General Burdinsky at a meeting, 29 January 2020

== See also ==
- National Military Command Center (United States)
- Military citadels under London (United Kingdom)
- Presidential Situation Center (Russia)
