= Main Computation Centre of the General Staff =

The Main Computation Centre of the General Staff (GVC) is a unit of the Russian Armed Forces dedicated to the guidance and control of missiles such as the sea-launched ЗМ-14 or Kalibr, ground-launched R-500 a.k.a. 9М728 or Iskander systems and air-launched Kh-101. The unit was established in 1963.

The group is found at a minimum of two locations: the headquarters of General Staff of the Russian Armed Forces at Znamenka Street 19 in Moscow, and at the Admiralty headquarters in St. Petersburg. As of October 2022 it was led by Major General Robert Baranov and Lt Col Igor Bagnyuk.

== Operations ==
The programmes for the flight path of the cruise missiles are generated remotely at GVC facilities in St. Petersburg or Moscow and transferred on a USB memory stick to the missile before launch, for example at an airfield, on board a truck, or at sea or a naval base in the case of a submarine.
