= Ivan Buvaltsev =

Russian military officer

- Иван Бувальцев
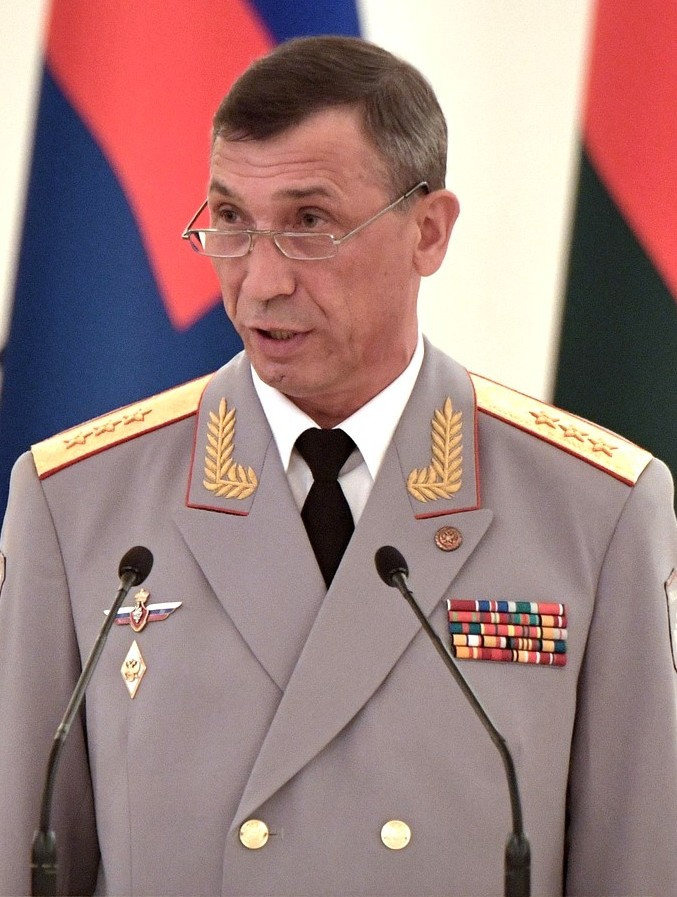
- Born: 17 November 1958 (age 67); Smolyaninovo, Primorsky Krai, RSFSR
- Education: Blagoveshchensk Higher Tank Command School; Malinovsky Armored Forces Academy; General Staff Military Academy
- Military career
- Allegiance: Soviet Union Russia
- Branch: Russian Armed Forces
- Rank: Colonel general
- Commands: 10th Guards Uralsko-Lvovskaya Tank Division; 27th Separate Guards Motor Rifle Brigade

Ivan Aleksandrovich Buvaltsev (Russian: Иван Александрович Бувальцев; born 17 November 1958) is a Russian military officer who served as the commander of the Main Directorate of Combat Training and Service of Troops. He has held the rank of Colonel general since 22 February 2019.

== Biography ==
Buvaltsev was born into a military family on 17 November 1958, in the village of Smolyaninovo, Shkotovsky District, Primorsky Krai.

Buvaltsev served in the Soviet Armed Forces since 1975. He graduated from the Blagoveshchensk Higher Tank Command School in 1979. Served as a platoon commander, company commander, and head of the tactical training cycle in the Far Eastern and Kiev Military Districts. In 1990, he graduated from the Malinovsky Military Armored Forces Academy. From 1990 to 1991, he served in the Western Group of Forces in East Germany as a tank battalion commander and since 1992 as chief of staff and deputy commander of a tank regiment. From 1995 to 1998 he served as tank regiment commander, from July 1999 he was the commander of the 27th Separate Guards Motor Rifle Brigade, from June 2001 to June 2004 he was the commander of the 10th Guards Uralsko-Lvovskaya Tank Division. From 2004 to 2006 he was head of the combat training department of the Moscow Military District. He participated in the Second Chechen War. In 2002 he was promoted to Major General rank.

In 2008, Buvaltsev graduated from the General Staff Military Academy. From July 2008 he was First Deputy Chief of the Main Directorate of Combat Training and Service of Troops. From January to November 2010 he served as Chief of Staff and First Deputy Commander of the Leningrad Military District. From November 2010 he served as Assistant of the Chief of the Russian General Staff for Troop Command. From July 2011 he served as Deputy Commander of the Western Military District. From February 2013 he served as Deputy Commander-in-Chief of the Russian Ground Forces and Chief of the Main Directorate of Combat Training of the Ground Forces. He was promoted to Lieutenant General on 20 February 2013.

By decree of the President of Russia in July 2013, Buvaltsev was appointed Chief of the Main Directorate of Combat Training and Service of Troops. He participated in the planning of the 2022 Russian Invasion of Ukraine.
