= Leonty Kuznetsov =

Soviet, Russian colonel general

- Леонтий Васильевич Кузнецов
- Born: Leonty Vasilyevich Kuznetsov; 13 August 1938 (age 88); Arkadak, Russian SFSR, Soviet Union
- Military career
- Allegiance: Soviet Union; Russia
- Branch: Russian Ground Forces
- Service years: 1961–1999
- Rank: Colonel general
- Commands: Moscow Military District (1992-1999)

Leonty Vasilyevich Kuznetsov (Russian: Леонтий Васильевич Кузнецов; born 13 August 1938) is a retired officer of the Soviet and later Russian Army who served as a Commander of the Moscow Military District from 1992 to 1999, having reached the rank of Colonel General in 1991.

== Biography ==
Kuznetsov was born on 13 August 1938, in the city of Arkadak, Saratov Oblast. After studying at a vocational school, he worked as a turner at the Hammer and Sickle factory in Saratov in 1961. He graduated from the Leningrad Higher All-Arms Command School named after S. M. Kirov in 1963, the Frunze Military Academy, and the Military Academy of the General Staff of the Armed Forces named after K. E. Voroshilov.

Kuznetsov served as a private in 1961, as a commander of a platoon, company, battalion, regiment, division, deputy commander and army commander. He was chief of staff of the Moscow Military District from May 1988 to 1990, then chief of staff of the Western Group of Forces from May 1990 to September 1991. He was Head of the Main Operational Directorate of the General Staff of the Russian Armed Forces and Deputy Chief of the General Staff of the United Armed Forces of the States – Members of the Commonwealth of Independent States from September 1991 to July 1992.

On 16 July 1992, Kuznestov became the commander of the Moscow Military District. On 20 April 1999, he retired from the military due to age limits.
