= 47th Motor Rifle Division =

Motor rifle division of the Soviet military

- Active: 1969–1989
- Country: Soviet Union
- Branch: Soviet Army
- Type: Motorized Infantry
- Garrison/HQ: Konotop

The 47th Motor Rifle Division was a motorized infantry division of the Soviet Army from 1969 to 1989. It was based in Konotop and became the 5198th Weapons and Equipment Storage Base in 1989. The 5198th combined with the 39th Guards Motor Rifle Division in 1991 to form the 5001st Guards Weapons and Equipment Storage Base.

== History ==
The 47th Motor Rifle Division was activated in July 1969 in Konotop to replace the 81st Guards Motor Rifle Division, which had been transferred to the Far East Military District. It was composed of the 109th, 114th and 146th Motor Rifle Regiments, as well as the 64th Tank Regiment and 185th Artillery Regiment. The division was part of the 1st Guards Army. During the Cold War, the division was maintained at 15% strength. On 1 July 1989, it was renamed the 5198th Weapons and Equipment Storage Base. In November 1991, it combined with the 39th Guards Motor Rifle Division to form the 5001st Guards Weapons and Equipment Storage Base.

== Composition ==
In 1988, the division included the following units. All units were based at Konotop unless noted.

- 109th Motorized Rifle Regiment (Chernigov)
- 114th Motorized Rifle Regiment
- 146th Motorized Rifle Regiment
- 64th Tank Regiment (Goncharovskye)
- 185th Artillery Regiment
- Antiaircraft Missile Regiment
- 643rd Separate Missile Battalion
- Separate Antitank Artillery Regiment
- Separate Reconnaissance Battalion
- Separate Engineer-Sapper Battalion (Goncharovskye)
- Separate Communications Battalion
- Separate Chemical Defence Company
- Separate Equipment Maintenance and Recovery Battalion
- Separate Medical Battalion
- Separate Material Supply Battalion
