= Main Organizational-Mobilizational Directorate of the General Staff of the Russian Armed Forces =

Main Organizational-Mobilizational Directorate of the General Staff of the Armed Forces of the Russian Federation
- Главное организационно-мобилизационное управление Генерального штаба Вооружённых сил Российской Федерации; Glavnoye organizatsionno-mobilizatsionnoye upravleniye Generalknogo shtaba Vooruzhyonnykh sil Rossiyskoy Federatsii
- Emblem of the Main Operational Directorate

Agency overview
- Headquarters: Main Building of the Ministry of Defense, Moscow
- Employees: Classified
- Annual budget: Classified
- Agency executive: Yevgeny Burdinsky, Director
- Parent agency: General Staff of the Armed Forces of the Russian Federation
- Website: Ministry of Defense Website

The Main Organizational-Mobilizational Directorate of the General Staff of the Russian Armed Forces, (Note: Russian: Главное организационно-мобилизационное управление Генерального штаба Вооружённых сил Российской Федерации, romanized: Glavnoye organizatsionno-mobilizatsionnoye upravleniye Generalknogo shtaba Vooruzhyonnykh sil Rossiyskoy Federatsii) official abbreviation GOMU GSh VS RF, (Note: Russian: ГОМУ ГШ ВС РФ) is the central military authority of the Russian Armed Forces, and previously of the USSR, responsible for carrying out the organizational development of the armed forces, their training and mobilization, preparation of mobilization resources, organization of conscription and recruitment of troops. The commander of the directorate is subordinate to the Chief of the General Staff of the Russian Armed Forces.

== History ==
For the first time, tasks of an organizational and mobilization nature were assigned to the Rank Order created in 1531, including keeping records of military men in peacetime in case of a gathering of troops.

At the beginning of the 18th century, during the reforms of Peter I, regiments and other military structures of the Russian Army and Navy began to be organized in accordance with the Shtats (literally "states," the Table of Organisation and Equipment). During the military reform in Russia in the 60s and 70s of the 19th century, the Russian Imperial Army was transferred to a personnel basis. At the same time, the need arose to continuously resolve issues of a mobilization nature. These issues were resolved by the Committee for the Mobilization of Troops of the General Staff (since 1903 - the mobilization department of the Office of the 2nd Quartermaster General of the General Staff). By 1917, organizational and mobilization tasks were carried out by the Main Directorate of the General Staff (it included a mobilization department and a department for the organization and service of troops).

On May 8, 1918, the All-Russian Main Headquarters was created in the Red Army. In November 1918, military commissariats were subordinated to him. Among the main tasks of the All-Russian General Staff were:

maintaining records, training and mobilization of military personnel, formation, organization and combat training of units of the Red Army, development of states, charters, manuals, instructions and regulations for troops. In 1921, a single Headquarters of the Red Army was created. It included organizational and mobilization departments.

In 1924, they were transformed into a single Organizational and Mobilization Directorate (since 1926, the 2nd Directorate of the Red Army Headquarters). He is entrusted with general issues of organizing the Armed Forces in peacetime and war, as well as preparing a mobilization plan.

In 1931, the 2nd Directorate of the Red Army Headquarters was divided into the 2nd (organizational), 5th (material planning) and 9th (troop mobilization).

In 1935, the Headquarters of the Red Army was renamed the General Staff. It included eight departments, including: organizational and material planning. In 1938, the Organizational Department of the General Staff was transformed into the Organizational and Mobilization Department. However, on February 1, 1939, an independent mobilization department was separated from its composition. In June 1939, the organizational and mobilization departments were merged into the Organizational and Mobilization Directorate.

In August 1940, the General Staff was transferred to a new staff and independent departments were created in it: mobilization, organizational, troop recruitment, logistics and supply departments.

After the outbreak of the Great Patriotic War in July 1941, all these structures were transferred from the General Staff to the created Main Directorate for the Formation and Recruitment of the Red Army (Glavupraform). But the experience of the war showed the fallacy of such a decision.

In April 1942, these bodies were returned to the General Staff and merged there into the Organizational Directorate. Since 1943 it was called the Main Organizational Directorate, and since 1955 - again the Organizational Directorate.

Since 1947, a mobilization department existed in the Main Organizational Directorate of the General Staff. From that moment on, the General Staff concentrated management of organizational and staff support, mobilization work, manning troops and mobilization planning of weapons and supplies for the army and navy.

In 1964, the Main Organizational and Mobilization Directorate was created at the General Staff. Since that time, its name and subordination have remained unchanged for over 50 years. Since 1970, the State Medical Directorate has included a third directorate - the directorate for mobilization planning of weapons, military equipment and other materiel. Since 1992 organizational management, mobilization management, weapons and equipment planning department.

== See also ==
- Conscription in Russia
- Military commissariat
- 2022 Russian mobilization
