= Predgorny (rural locality) =

Predgorny (Russian: Предго́рный; masculine), Predgornaya (Предго́рная; feminine), or Predgornoye (Предго́рное; neuter) is the name of several rural localities in Russia:

- Predgorny, Biysky District, Altai Krai, a settlement in Srostinsky Selsoviet of Biysky District of Altai Krai
- Predgorny, Zmeinogorsky District, Altai Krai, a settlement in Kuzminsky Selsoviet of Zmeinogorsky District of Altai Krai
- Predgorny, Krasnodar Krai, a settlement in Seversky Rural Okrug of Seversky District of Krasnodar Krai
- Predgorny, Krasnoyarsk Krai, a settlement in Stepnovsky Selsoviet of Nazarovsky District of Krasnoyarsk Krai
- Predgornoye, Karachay–Cherkess Republic, a selo in Urupsky District of the Karachay–Cherkess Republic
- Predgornoye, Republic of North Ossetia–Alania, a selo in Predgornensky Rural Okrug of Mozdoksky District of the Republic of North Ossetia–Alania
