= NDMC Supercomputer =

Military supercomputer in Moscow, Russia

- Operators: National Defense Management Center
- Location: Moscow, Russia
- Architecture: Russian processor units, Elbrus-8S + Komdiv128-RIO (Floating-point arithmetic accelerator / Coprocessor)
- Operating system: Astra Linux
- Storage: 236 PB
- Speed: 16 PFLOPS
- Ranking: TOP500: 7th (@16 PFLOPS), 2017

NDMC Supercomputer (Russian: НЦУО Суперкомпьютер) is a military supercomputer with a speed of 16 petaflops, operated by the National Defense Management Center. It is located in Moscow, Russia. The storage capacity is 236 petabytes. The supercomputer is designed to predict the development of armed conflicts and is able to analyze the situation and draw conclusions based on the information about past military conflicts. The database of the supercomputer contains data on the major armed conflicts of modernity for the efficient analysis of future threats.

The "NDMC" in the name stands for its operator, the National Defense Management Center.

== See also ==
- TOP500
