= 25th Guards Rifle Division =

25th Guards Rifle Division (1942–1957) 115th Guards Motor Rifle Division (1957–1964) 25th Guards Motor Rifle Division (1964–1992) 25th Mechanised Division (1992 – c. 2000)
- Active: 1942–2000
- Country: Soviet Union; Ukraine
- Branch: Red Army (1942-1946); Soviet Army (1946-1991); Ukrainian Ground Forces
- Type: Infantry
- Nickname: Chapayevskaya
- Engagements: World War II
- Battle honours: Order of the Red Banner; Order of Lenin

Insignia
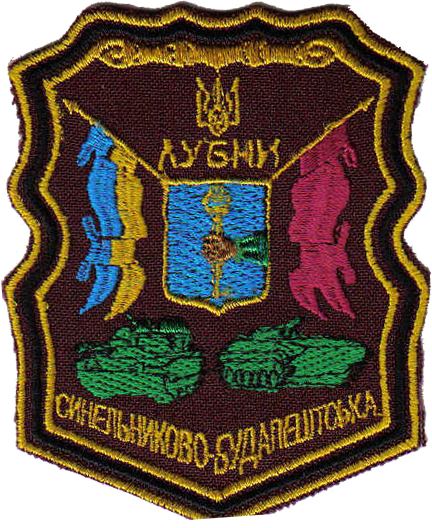
- Division sleeve patch

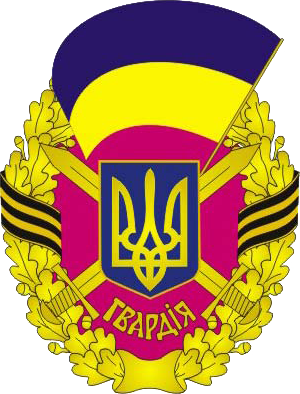
- Guards unit

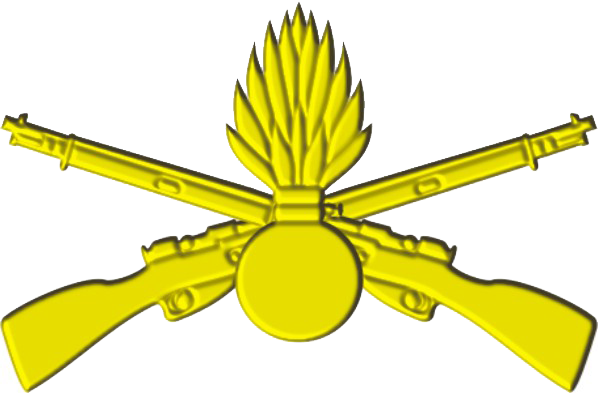
- Mechanized branch insignia

The 25th Guards Rifle Division 'Chapayevskaya' was a division of the Soviet Red Army. The division was reorganised and reformed several times until the collapse of the Soviet Union, when it entered service in the Ukrainian Army as the 25th Mechanised Division (Ukrainian: 25-та механізована дивізія, romanized: 25-ta mekhanizovana dyviziya).

== History ==
=== World War II ===
Formed in the period from 24 April 1942 to 12 July 1942, pursuant to Directive GShKA N org/2/783669 on 16 April 1942, by converting the 2nd Guards Rifle Brigade, ex 71st Naval Rifle Brigade, station Sonkovo, Kalinin region. 11–12 July 1942 the Division left the place of formation for the Voronezh Front, arrived in the front, and from 22 July 1942 until 4 August 1942 it built the defence line on the eastern bank of the river Bityug. Participated in the battles to establish a bridgehead on the river Don north of the city Korotoyak in August 1942, Ostrogozh-Rossoshanskij, Voronezh-Kastornoye, Kharkov offensive and defensive operations. It took part in the operations to take cities of Budapest and Bratislava.

After the end of World War II (after 1955?), the 25th Guards Rifle Division was given the name and honors of the pre-war 25th Rifle Division, which had been destroyed in the siege of Sevastopol. Thus it received the name 'Chapayevskaya' after the commander of the 25th RD during the Civil War, Vasily Chapayev. The division's full title became 25th Guards Rifle Sinelnikovo-Budapest Orders of Red Banner, Suvorov and B. Khmelnitsky Division named for V.I. Chapayev (Russian: 25-я Гвардейская мотострелковая Синельниковско-Будапештская Краснознамённая, орденов Суворова и Б. Хмельницкого дивизия имени В. Чапаева.)

=== Cold War ===
The 2nd Guards Rifle Brigade was formed from 25th GRD at Kiev, Kiev MD with 20th Guards Rifle Corps after the war. It became 25th GRD again in October 1953. (Feskov et al. 2013)

The division was reorganized as a Motor Rifle Division (115th Guards) in 1957, and eventually transferred to the 1st Guards Army in the Kiev Military District. Previously it had been the 38th Guards Mechanised Division.

In December 1964, the division was renumbered the 25th Guards Motor Rifle Division. In March 1967 it was named after the legendary Civil War hero Vasily Chapayev and thus became the successor of the traditions of the division as the 25th Guards Rifle Division and odnonomernoy 25th Chapayev Infantry Division, died in the besieged Sevastopol and disbanded in late July 1942 (banners parts drowned in the Black Sea).

After the war, the 25th Guards Motor Rifle Division was one of the two names divisions of the Soviet Army, named after the commanders (along with Panfilov - the 8th Guards Rifle Division in the name of I.V. Panfilov).

Order of Battle, 25th Guards Motor Rifle Division, 1988–9

- 25th Guards Motor Rifle 'Sinelnikovo-Budapest' Order of the Red Banner, Order of Suvorov and Order of Bogdan Khmelnitsky Division named for V.I. Chapayev (Lubny)
  - 132nd Guards Red Banner Order of Suvorov and Kutznesov Regiment (Lubny): 10 T-64; 9 BTR-60, 4 BMP (2 BMP-1, 2 BMP-1К); 12 D-30; 1 PRP-3, 3 1V18, 1 - 1V19; 5 R-145BM, 2 PU-12; 1 MT-55A
  - 136th Guards Motor Rifle Red Banner Regiment (Lubny): Equipment is identical to that of the 132nd Regiment
  - 426th Guards Motor Rifle Regiment (Lubny): 10 Т-64; 21 BMP (19 BMP-1, 2 BMP-1К); 3 BTR-60" 12 - 2S1 "Gvozdika"; 2 BMP-1K, 1 PRP-3, 3 RHM, 2 MTP-2; 4 R-145BM, 2 PU-12; 1 MTU-20, 1 MT-55А
  - 280th Tank Regiment (Goncharovskoe): 31 Т-64; 4 BMP (2 BMP-1, 2 BMP-1К); 12 - 2S1 "Gvozdika"; 2 BMP-1K, 1 PRP-3, 2 R-145BM, 2 PU-12; 2 МТ-55А; 29 МТ-LBT
  - 53rd Guards Self-Propelled Artillery Regiment (Lubny): 12 BM-21 "Grad"; 2 PRP-3, 3 - 1ВV18, 1 - 1V19; 22 МТ-LBT
  - 1175th Anti-Aircraft Rocket Regiment

=== Dissolution ===
After the dissolution of the Soviet Union the division became part of the Ukrainian Ground Forces as the 25th Mechanized Division. The division retained its Soviet-era awards and honorifics. One of its regiments, the 280th Tank Regiment, was used to form a new armoured brigade, the 1st Armored Brigade at Honcharivske. The 25th Mechanized Division was disbanded in 2000.

== Awards ==

- Order of the Red Banner, the division along with 9 separate regiments.
- Order of Lenin
- 78 of the division's personnel were awarded the Gold Star of the Hero of the Soviet Union

== See also ==
- List of Soviet Union divisions 1917–1945
- Zirka Lubny, a football club formed from the sports company of the division.
