= RusBITech =

Russian technology company

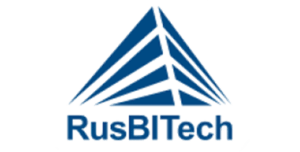
- Native name: АО «НПО РусБИТех»
- Industry: software
- Headquarters: Moscow, Russia
- Key people: Alexei Bocharov (Director General), Ilya Sivtsev (Operational Director and head of RusBITech Astra)
- Website: rusbitech.ru/en/

RPA RusBITech JSC (Russian: АО «НПО РусБИТех») is a Russian technology company specializing in production of high technology solutions for Russian state enforcement structures, mainly for the Russian Army. The most known product is the computer operating system called Astra Linux which is nowadays used almost totally throughout Russian military forces. The main Russian Army headquarters, The National Defense Management Center's, information systems are based on Astra Linux. The Director General of RusBITech is Alexei Bocharov.

== RusBITech Astra ==
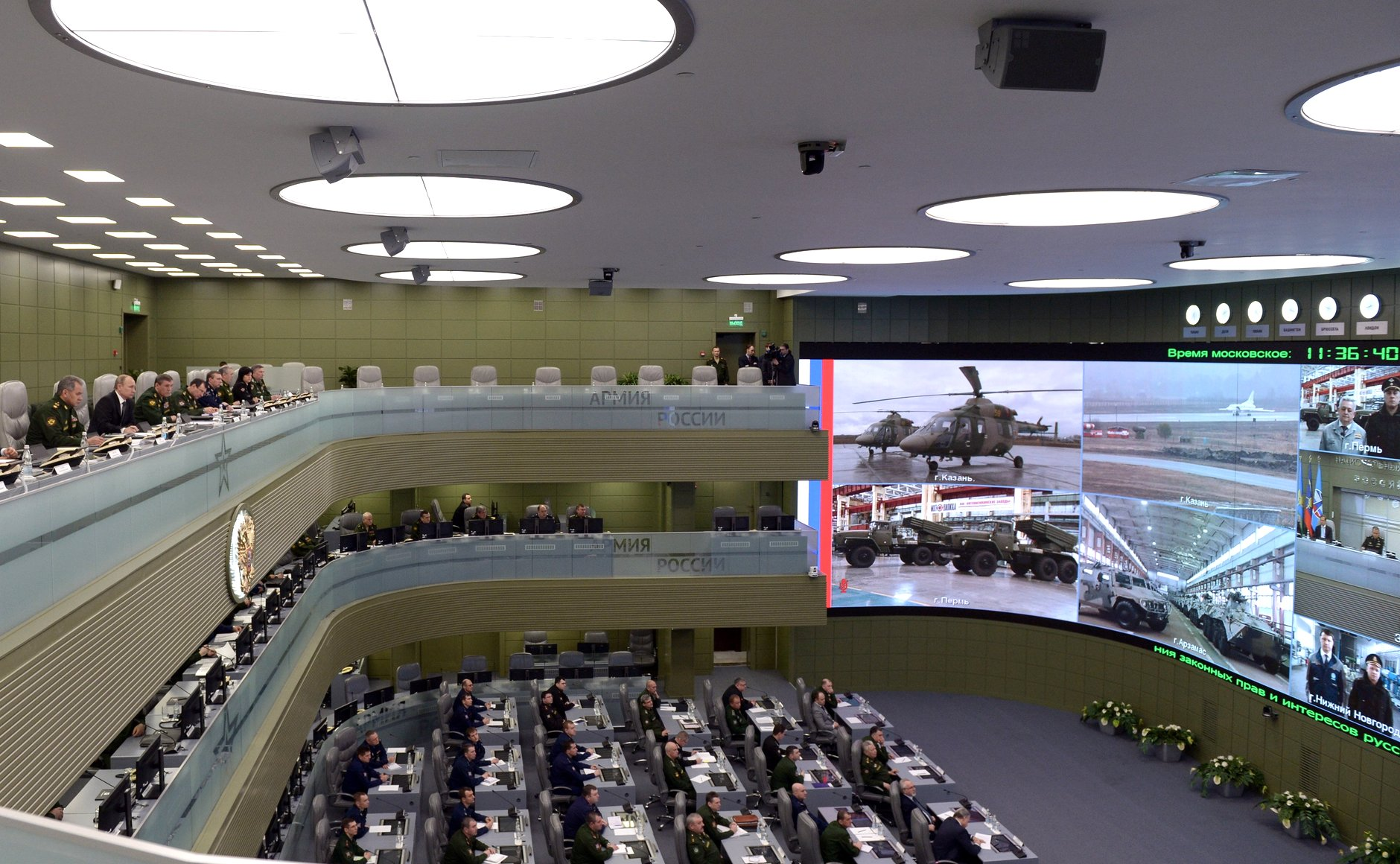
Astra Linux is being used in Russian Russian National Center for Defence Control

RusBITech Astra is the company derived from RusBITech solely to serve tasks related to Astra Linux. Astra Linux is being implemented in Russian state structures according to Russian Government decree No.2299-р of 17/10/2010 that orders federal authorities and budget institutions to implement Free Software usage. Versions of Astra Linux are produced for desktop PCs, mobile devices, servers, networking hardware and mainframes.

It is declared the Astra Linux licenses correspond with Russian and international laws and "don't contradict with the spirit and demands of GPL license". The system uses .deb packages.

In 2019, it was specially emphasized that Russian Army was going to totally give up Microsoft Windows in favor of Astra Linux.

Other law enforcement services, state-related institutions and companies (primarily, so-called "system-forming enterprises") also began using Astra Linux in the general course of Russian Federation's efforts in import substitution and lowering dependence from Microsoft products. Among them Russian Police, Moscow Metro, Gazprom (national gas/oil holding), Rosatom (nuclear power provider), Russian Railways.

The Director General of RusBITech Astra is Ilya Sivtsev, he also serves as Operational Director of RusBITech. He is also a stakeholder at a Russian company Varton, a manufacturer of LED lighting.

In 2025, the Astra Group acquired GitFlic, a proprietary developer platform that allows developers to create, store, manage and share code, originally developed by ReSolut LLC. It uses Git to provide distributed version control, as well as providing functionality for testing, static analysis and continuous integration. A package manager is also available. The platform was developed as a Russian alternative to the American-based GitHub, which is subject to US trade control laws.

=== Worldwide partnerships ===
Astra Linux is considered a recognized Debian Linux derivative, Rusbitech has partnership relations with The Linux Foundation. However, RusBITech was suspended from the advisory board of The Document Foundation on 26 of February 2022, due to the Russian invasion of Ukraine and RusBITech's relationship with the Russian Armed Forces.

In February 2018, Rusbitech announced it had ported Astra Linux to Russian-made Elbrus microprocessors. These microprocessors have its own microprocessor architecture, an alternative to commonly used architectures such as x86, which development began in USSR back in the 1970s and is commonly known nowadays as Elbrus 2000 or E2K.

RusBITech holds partnerships with some of the world high-tech companies such as Huawei (Astra Linux support in servers), Tianwan Nuclear Power Plant (specialized secure OS usage) and many others, which in part (according to themselves), include: Kaspersky Lab, DOSAAF and Megafon.

== Other activities ==
Besides that, RusBITech purportedly produces:

- information security tools (software and hardware);
- secured software and hardware systems;
- technical training aids (computer simulators for training military personnel);
- 3D visualization systems (also used for training);
- simulation and decision support systems (for military commandment);
- data interface facilities (database solutions for armed forces).

For example, RusBITech manufactures software for Russian Army's R-441 "Liven" vehicles, specified as "satellite communication stations / mobile communications-control stations / digital mobile complex of secret telephone communication and mobile super-protected telecommunications complex".
