= Presidential Situation Center (Russia) =

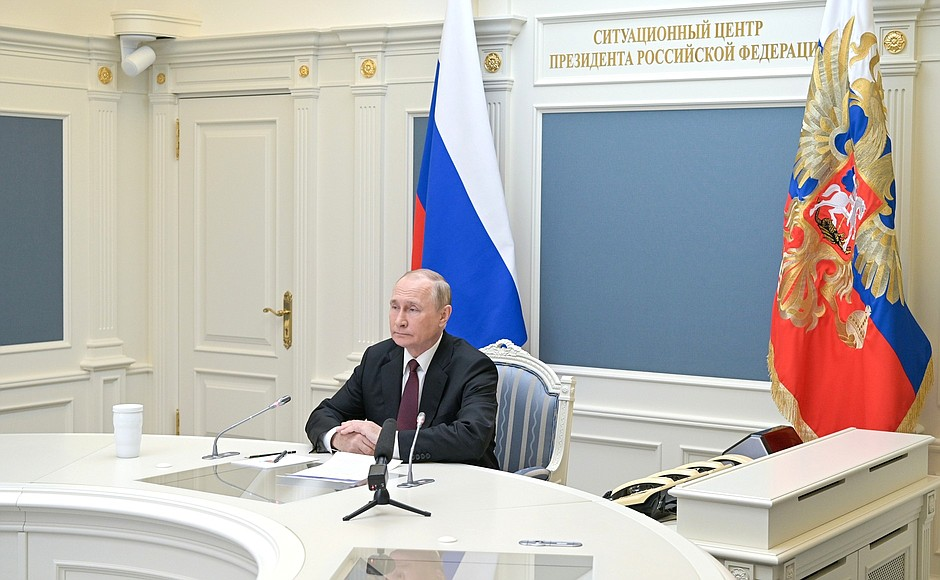
- President Putin presiding over nuclear drill from the Situation Center
- Building: Kremlin Senate, Moscow Kremlin
- Location: Moscow
- Country: Russia
- Purpose: Conference room and intelligence management center

The Presidential Situation Center (Russian: Ситуационный центр Администрации Президента РФ (СЦ)) is a control room managed by the Control Department of the Directorate of the President of the Administration of the President of Russia.

== Overview ==
The center is located at the Kremlin Senate which is the official working place of the Russian President. Information of high importance from within Russia and outside the country is flowing to the center The center was first created in 1996 but since then passed modernization. The center is staffed with people from the Ministry of Defense.

== See also ==
- National Defense Management Center
