= General Staff of the Armed Forces of the Russian Federation =

Military staff of the Russian Armed Forces

Coordinates: 55°45′02″N 37°36′10″E

General Staff of the Armed Forces
- Генеральный штаб Вооружённых сил Российской Федерации; General'nyy shtab Vooruzhyonnykh sil Rossiiskoi Federatsii
- General Staff emblem

- Official Standard (Banner)

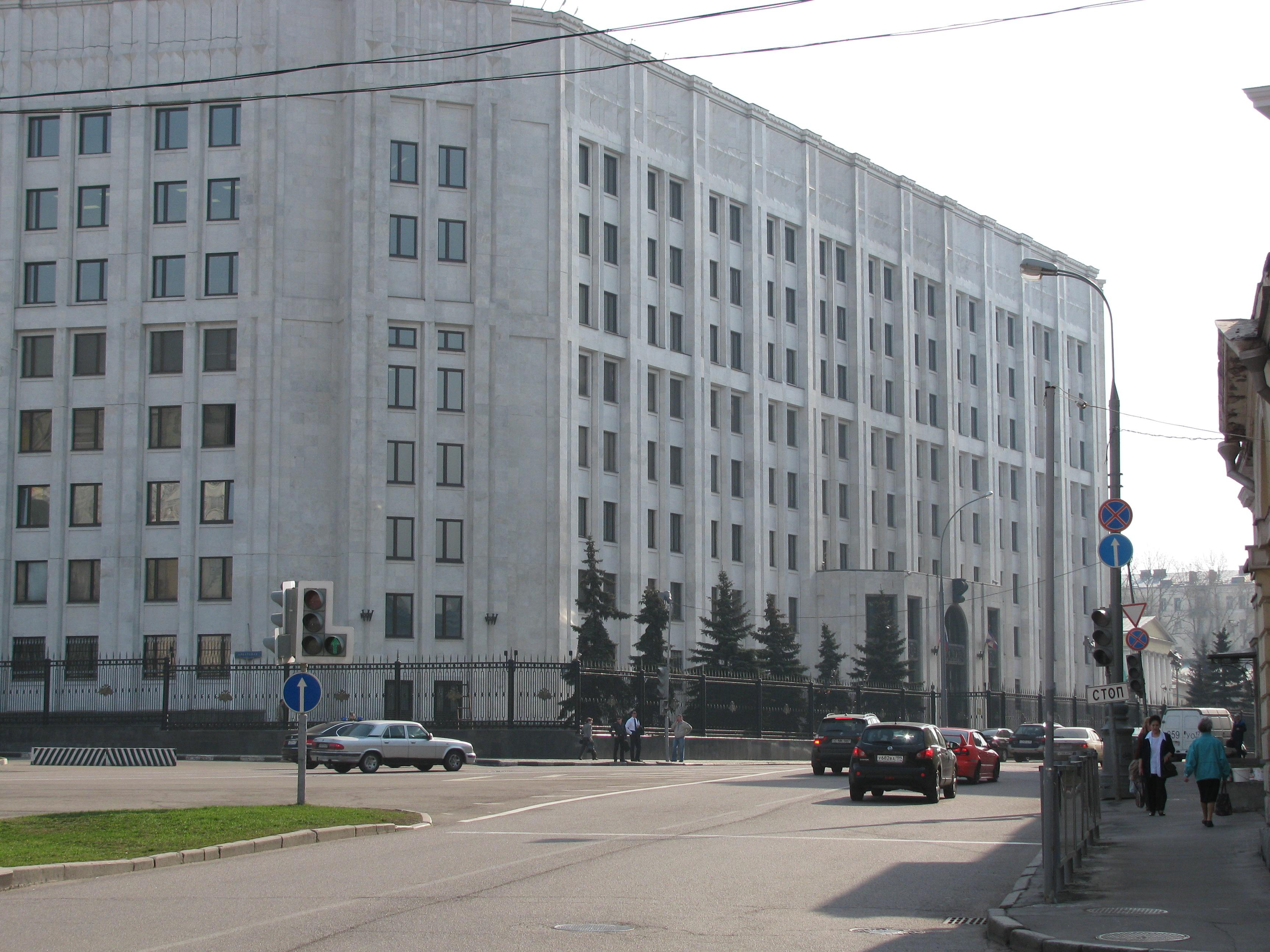
- Main Building of the General Staff at Znamenka 14

Staff overview
- Formed: 10 June 1992 (25 January 1763)
- Preceding agencies: General Staff of the Armed Forces of the Soviet Union (1946–1991); General Staff of the Red Army (1921–1946); Revolutionary Military Council of the Republic (1918–1921); Council of People's Commissars on War and Navy Affairs (1917–1918); Imperial Russian Army (1812–1917)
- Headquarters: Znamenka 14/1, Moscow
- Minister responsible: Andrey Belousov, Minister of Defence
- Staff executives: Gen. Valery Gerasimov, Chief of the General Staff; Col. Gen. Nikolay Bogdanovsky, First Deputy Chief of the General Staff
- Website: www.mil.ru

The General Staff of the Armed Forces of the Russian Federation (Russian: Генеральный штаб Вооружённых сил Российской Федерации, romanized: General'nyy shtab Vooruzhonnykh sil Rossiiskoi Federatsii) is the military staff of the Russian Armed Forces. It is the central organ of the military command of the Armed Forces Administration and oversees operational command of the armed forces under the Russian Ministry of Defence.

As of 2012, the Chief of the General Staff is General of the Army Valery Gerasimov and since 2014, the First Deputy Chief of the General Staff is Colonel General Nikolay Bogdanovsky.

The General Staff Building is located in Moscow at Znamenka Street 19 in the Arbat District. Together with the Main Building of the Ministry of Defense and several Staff directorate office buildings nearby, it forms the so-called "Arbat military district" as it is often referred to among the military personnel to outline the highest supreme command of the Russian Armed Forces.

== History ==
The General Staff's history dates back to its creation as early as 25 January 1763 during the Russian Empire. The Day of the General Staff of the Armed Forces of the Russian Federation is celebrated annually on 25 January, even though the current Russian General Staff was established at a different date. The General Staff of Imperial Russia then became the General Staff of the Armed Forces of the USSR in 1918 before being succeeded by the present Staff.

In the Soviet Armed Forces, the General Staff acted as the main commanding and supervising body of the military. A Red Army Staff first formed in 1921 but, historian John Erickson says, until 1924 developed into an unwieldy grouping dealing with combat training, routine Red Army affairs, and defence policy, all without real definition. Erickson dates the development of the Staff as the Soviet "military brain" from Mikhail Frunze's appointment to the post of Chief of Staff by Order No.78 of 1 April 1924. 'From this date.. the history of the Soviet General Staff – as it was to become – begins'.

On 22 September 1935, the authorities renamed the RKKA Staff as the General Staff, which essentially reincarnated the General Staff of the Russian Empire. Many of the former RKKA Staff officers had served as General Staff officers in the Russian Empire and became General Staff officers in the USSR. General Staff officers typically had extensive combat experience and solid academic training.

William Odom wrote:

During World War II [the General Staff] became Stalin's main organ for operational direction of all military forces. After the war it became the most powerful centre for virtually all aspects of military planning, operations, and determination of resource requirements. The minister of defence had only a limited staff for his own support, leaving him heavily dependent on the General Staff. … Within the Ministry of Defence, all the resource allocation issues were normally resolved by the chief of the General Staff before going to the minister, and finally, after consultation with GOSPLAN, to the Politburo.

During the Cold War, the Soviet General Staff maintained Soviet plans for the invasion of Western Europe, whose massive scale was made known secretly to the West by spies such as Ryszard Kukliński and later published by German researchers working with the National People's Army files, and the Parallel History Project and the associated Polish exercise documents, Seven Days to the River Rhine (1979).

The Main Military Scientific Directorate of the General Staff was formed in accordance with an order of the Minister of the Armed Forces of March 22, 1949 (since 1953 - the Military Scientific Directorate of the General Staff).

In 1978, the Military Scientific Directorate was disbanded, and the management of scientific work in the Armed Forces was carried out by the Directorate of Operational Training and Military Scientific Work of the Main Operations Directorate of the General Staff. In 1985, the Military Scientific Directorate was re-established.

Since the dissolution of the Soviet Union and especially since 2004 the General Staff and the Russian Ministry of Defence have attempted to divide direction of the armed forces between them, often in intense bouts of bureaucratic disagreement. It has been reported that the General Staff's main role now is that of the Russian Ministry of Defence's department of strategic planning, and the Minister of Defence himself is now gaining executive authority over the troops. This is, however, contradicted by some Russian commentators and defence analysts.

Defence Minister Anatoliy Serdyukov who initiated the 2008 military reform, in order for separation of operational and administrative functions, the Ministry of Defense formed two functional lines of responsibility: the first was planning the use and construction of the Armed Forces, the second was planning the comprehensive support of troops (forces). The transition to a three-tier principle of responsibility was conducted: the main commands of the branches and formations were responsible for combat training, and the General Staff, joint strategic commands and formations were responsible for operational training. As a result of the transformations carried out, the General Staff was freed from duplicate functions and became a full-fledged strategic planning body that organizes and exercises control of the Armed Forces in fulfilling the assigned tasks.

During the Russian intervention in the Syrian civil war, a Joint Group of Forces was established in Syria by the General Staff on 30 September 2015. It is a separate, temporary command of the General Staff for an operation, and its commander is the representative of the General Staff. At the start of the February 2022 Russian invasion of Ukraine, the General Staff initially had direct control over the four Ministry of Defense groups of forces from the National Defense Management Center in Moscow, which was carried out through the Southern Military District headquarters. A separate Joint Group of Forces was established for the Special Military Operation in Ukraine on 8 October 2022 in Rostov-on-Don.

== General Staff organization ==
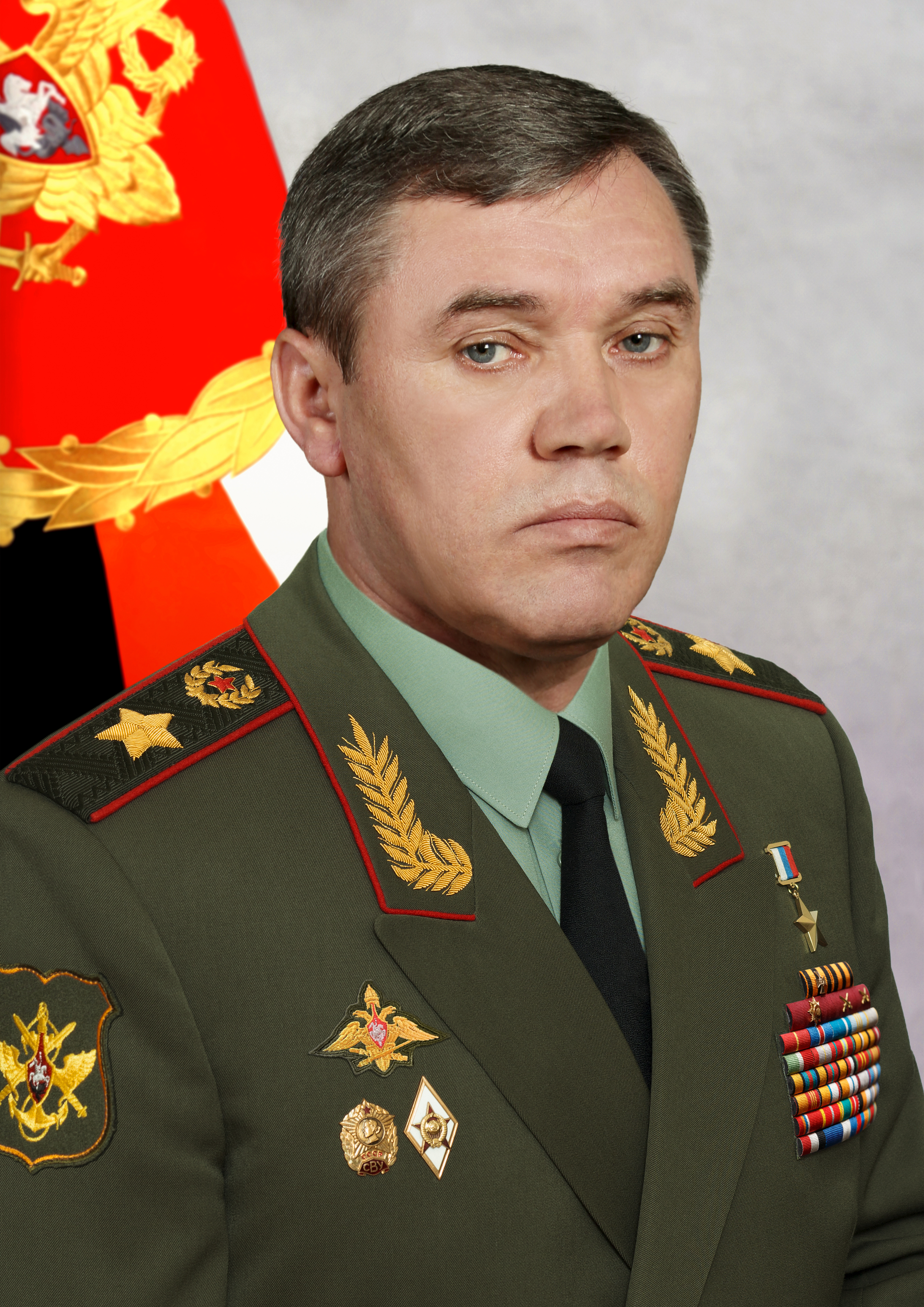
Chief of the General Staff Army General Valery Gerasimov with shoulder boards.

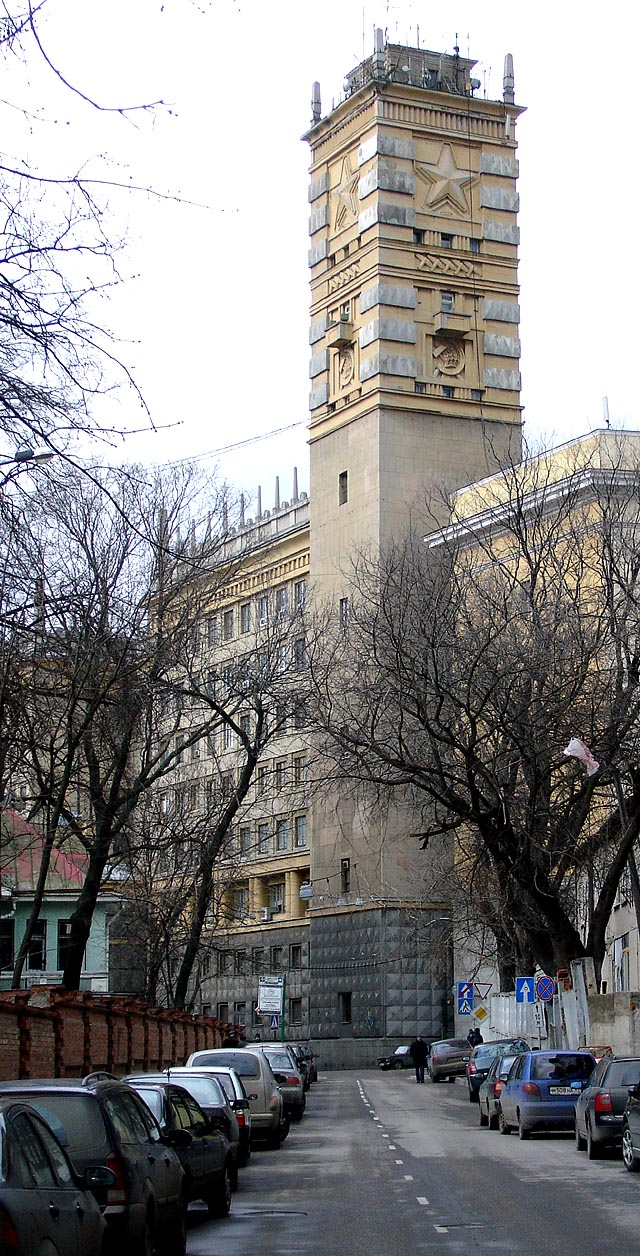
General Staff (old building) on Znamenka Street in Moscow

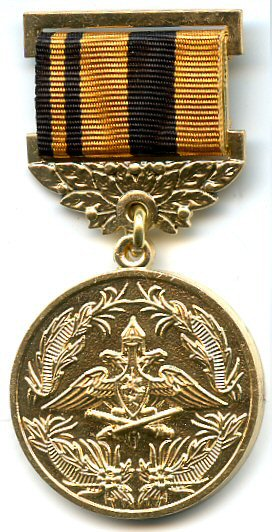
Memorial sign "250 years of the General Staff" (2013)

=== Structure in 2026 ===
Senior staff in 2026 included:

==== Chief of the General Staff ====
Chief of the General Staff – First Deputy Minister of Defence of the Russian Federation – General of the Army Valery Gerasimov (since 9 November 2012)

==== General Staff ====
Sources:

- First Deputy Chief of General Staff – Colonel General Nikolai Bogdanovsky (since 2014)
- Main Operations Directorate of the General Staff – First Deputy Chief of General Staff – Colonel General Sergey Rudskoy (since 24 November 2015)
- Main Directorate of the General Staff - GRU (G.U.) – Deputy Chief of General Staff – Admiral Igor Kostyukov (since 22 November 2018)
- Main Organization and Mobilization Directorate of the General Staff – Deputy Chief of General Staff – Colonel General Yevgeny Burdinsky (since March 2018)
- Main Communications Directorate – Deputy Chief of General Staff – Lieutenant General Valery Tishkov (since October 2024)
- National Defense Management Center – Colonel General Stanislav Gadzimagomedov (since April 2023)
- Deputy Chief of the General Staff – Colonel General Sergei Istrakov (since 2015)
- Chairman of the Military-Scientific Committee of the Russian Armed Forces – Deputy Chief of the General Staff – Colonel General Vasily Trushin (since 2021)
- Deputy Chief of the General Staff – Colonel General Alexei Kim (since September 2022)
- Directorate of the Chief of Electronic Warfare Troops – Lieutenant General Yuri Lastochkin (since 2014)
- Military Topographic Directorate of the General Staff – Major General Aleksandr Zalizniuk (since 2014)
- 8th Directorate of the General Staff – Major General Andrei Kolovanov (since 2023)
- Operational Training Directorate of the General Staff – Lieutenant General Fanil Sarvarov X (from 2016 until 2025)
- Directorate for the Construction and Development of Unmanned Aerial Systems – Major General Aleksandr Novikov
- Archival Service – Colonel Eduard Paderin (since 2013)

==== Main Departments ====
- Main Directorate of Deep-Sea Research – Vice Admiral Vladimir Grishechkin (since March 2021)
- Main Computation Center of the General Staff – Major General Robert Baranov

==== Departments ====
- Directorate of the Chief of the Radiation, Chemical and Biological Defense Troops – Major General Alexei Rtishchev (since 2025)
- Office of the Chief of Engineering Troops – Lieutenant General Yuri Stavitsky (since July 2010)
- Department of Physical Training and Sports – Colonel Andrei Zykov (since December 2018)
- Directorate of Metrology – Colonel Sergey Podstrekha
- Military Scientific Committee of the Armed Forces of the Russian Federation
- Headquarters of Logistics – Major General Vladimir Konovalov

==== Services ====
- Flight Safety Service – Lieutenant General Sergei Baynetov (since December 2016)
- Military Band Service – Major General Timofey Mayakin (since August 2016)
- Military Heraldic Service – Colonel Alexandr Manakov
- Hydrometeorological Service – Colonel Vladimir Udrish (since 2015)

==== Main Commands ====
- Russian Ground Forces – Colonel General Andrei Mordvichev (since May 2025)
- Russian Navy – Admiral Alexandr Moiseev (since March 2024)
- Russian Air Force – Colonel General Aleksandr Chayko (since May 2026)

==== Commands ====
- Special Operations Forces – Major General Valery Flyustikov (since 2018)
- Russian Airborne Forces – Colonel General Mikhail Teplinsky (since June 2022)
- Strategic Rocket Forces – Colonel General Sergey Karakayev (since June 2010)
- Unmanned Systems Forces – Colonel General Denis Lyamin (since August 2026)

As of September 2015:

- Main Directorate of Communications
- Main Operational Directorate
- Main Intelligence Directorate - GRU (G.U.)
- Main Organizational and Mobilization Directorate
- Main Command – Ground Forces
- Main Command – Navy
- Main Command – Air Forces
- Aerospace Defense Command – Space Forces and Air and Missile Defense Forces
- Strategic Rocket Forces Command
- Directorate of the Chief of Electronic Warfare Troops
- Main Missile and Artillery Directorate - GRAU
- Military Topographical Directorate
- Main Computation Centre of the General Staff
- Airborne Forces Command
- Special Operations Forces Command (Russian: командование сил специальных операций, abbr. KCCO, romanized: Komandovanie sil spetsial’nykh operatsii) - KSSO (2012 – present)
- National Defense Management Center (replaced the Central Command Post)
- Operational Training Directorate
- 8th Directorate
- Troop service and safety of military service Directorate
- Directorate of the Chief of the Construction and Development of Unmanned Aerial Vehicle systems
- Directorate of the Chief of the Radiation, Chemical, and Biological Defense Troops
- Directorate of the Chief of Engineering Troops
- Main Directorate of Deep-Sea Research
- Hydrometeorological Service
