= Vasily Arkhipov (general) =

Red Army (1906–1985)

- Born: 29 December [O.S. 16 December] 1906; Tyuntnyary village, Perm Governorate, Russian Empire
- Died: 13 June 1985 (aged 78); Moscow, USSR
- Burial place: Kuntsevo Cemetery
- Military career
- Allegiance: Soviet Union
- Branch: Red Army (Soviet Army from 1946)
- Service years: 1928–1971
- Rank: Colonel general
- Commands: 109th Tank Brigade; 53rd Guards Tank Brigade; 6th Guards Tank Division; 1st Separate Army
- Conflicts: World War II; Winter War; Eastern Front
- Awards: Hero of the Soviet Union (twice)

Vasily Sergeyevich Arkhipov (Russian: Василий Сергеевич Архипов; 29 December [O.S. 16 December] 1906 – 13 June 1985) was an officer in the tank troops of the Red Army who was twice awarded the title Hero of the Soviet Union for his actions in the Winter War and World War II. He rose to the rank of colonel general during the Cold War.

For his leadership of a tank company of the 112th Tank Battalion of the 35th Light Tank Brigade in the Winter War, Arkhipov was awarded the title Hero of the Soviet Union. Arkhipov commanded the 53rd Guards Tank Brigade from the summer of 1943 and was awarded his second Gold Star for his leadership of the brigade in the Vistula-Oder Offensive. Postwar, Arkhipov commanded the 6th Guards Tank Division, the armored forces of the Turkestan Military District, and the 1st Guards Army. He ended his career as an adviser to the National People's Army of postwar East Germany.

== Early life and prewar service ==
Born on 29 December 1906 in the village of Tyuntnyary, Perm Governorate, Arkhipov worked as a shepherd while he went through primary school, which he completed in 1921. He became an apprentice at a harness workshop and a laborer at a mill in Chelyabinsk between 1921 and 1924. Until 1927, Arkhipov was a laborer at the Verkhneklimsk coal furnace near Zlatoust, then became a manual laborer at a hydroelectric power station in Chelyabinsk.

He was drafted into the Red Army in November 1928, serving with the 24th Rifle Division. He graduated from the school of the 70th Rifle Regiment of the division in Vinnytsia in 1929 and became a squad leader, assistant platoon commander, and platoon commander with the regiment. He transferred to the 24th Tank Battalion of the division to serve as a tank platoon commander and as assistant chief of the battalion school for personnel in the early 1930s. Arkhipov graduated from the Platoon Commander Training Courses at the Odessa Infantry School in 1931 and the Courses for Retraining of Command Personnel of the Ukrainian Military District at Zhitomir a year later.

After completing the Leningrad Armored Courses for the Improvement of Command Cadre in September 1938, Arkhipov was sent to the Leningrad Military District, becoming a company commander in the tank training battalion of the 11th Separate Tank Brigade and subsequently a company commander in the 112th Separate Tank Battalion of the 35th Light Tank Brigade. He fought in the Winter War with the brigade, and for his courage in the breakthrough of the Mannerheim Line Arkhipov, then a captain, was made a Hero of the Soviet Union and awarded the Order of Lenin on 21 March 1940. He commanded the 108th Separate Tank Battalion of the brigade from October 1940 and in May 1941 was appointed commander of the reconnaissance battalion of the 43rd Tank Division, stationed in the Kiev Special Military District.

== World War II ==
From the beginning of Operation Barbarossa on 22 June 1941, Arkhipov fought in the Battle of Brody and the First Battle of Kiev. From August he commanded the 10th Tank Regiment of the 10th Tank Brigade, and in December became brigade deputy commander. Appointed commander of the 109th Tank Brigade, forming in Voronezh, in April 1942, Arkhipov led it as part of the 16th Tank Corps of the Bryansk Front in defensive battles west of Livny during June and July, during which it was surrounded for three days. In mid-August, the 109th was relocated to the Stalingrad Front, participating in counterattacks on German troops who broke through to the Volga northwest of Stalingrad in the Kotluban region with the 1st Guards Army, then in defensive battles in the sector. With the beginning of Operation Uranus, the brigade fought in the Vertyachy sector. In January 1943, the 109th was sent to the Central Front, fighting in attacks toward Fatezh and Krasny Sevsk.

In August, Arkhipov, then a colonel, completed the Academic Courses for Technical Improvement at the Armored and Mechanized Forces Academy and was appointed commander of the 53rd Guards Tank Brigade of the 6th Guards Tank Corps, which he commanded for the rest of the war as part of the Voronezh Front (the 1st Ukrainian Front from 20 October). In late 1943 the brigade fought in the Second Battle of Kiev and the Zhitomir–Berdichev Offensive, receiving the Order of the Red Banner for its actions, while Arkhipov was awarded the Order of Kutuzov, 2nd class, on 10 January 1944. In the spring of 1944, the brigade distinguished itself in the Proskurov–Chernovitsy Offensive, receiving the Order of Bogdan Khmelnitsky, 2nd class. in the summer, Arkhipov led the brigade in the Lvov–Sandomierz Offensive, during which it participated in the capture of Yavoruv, Sudovaya Vyshnya, and Przemyśl, crossed the San, Wisłok, and Vistula, and fought in the expansion and holding of the Sandomierz bridgehead as part of the forward detachment of the corps. For his leadership, Arkhipov was awarded the title Hero of the Soviet Union and the Order of Lenin a second time on 23 September 1944.

In 1945, the brigade fought in the Sandomierz–Silesian Offensive, the Lower Silesian Offensive, the Berlin Offensive, and the Prague Offensive. For its actions in Poland, the 53rd Guards received the Order of Lenin, and the Order of Suvorov, 2nd class, followed for the Berlin Offensive. Arkhipov was awarded the Order of the Red Banner on 17 January and 9 June.

== Postwar ==
After the end of the war, the corps was reorganized into the 6th Guards Tank Division and Arkhipov became its deputy commander in August, as it served with the Central Group of Forces and then the Group of Soviet Occupation Forces in Germany. From May 1946 he commanded the division, which was reduced to the 6th Guards Tank Regiment in November. Appointed commander of the Armored and Mechanized Forces of the Turkestan Military District in December 1950 after graduating from the Higher Military Academy, Arkhipov became assistant commander-in-chief of the forces of the district for tank equipment and chief of the armored directorate of the district in January 1954. From July of that year he served as assistant commander-in-chief of the forces of the district and chief of its Combat Training Directorate.

Arkhipov advanced to command the 1st Separate Army at Constanța in April 1958 and in May 1960 became first deputy commander-in-chief of the Siberian Military District. From September 1961 he was senior military adviser to the commander of a military district of the East German National People's Army. Promoted to colonel general of tank forces on 22 June 1963, he was transferred to the reserve due to illness in July 1971, and died in Moscow on 13 June 1985. He was buried at the Kuntsevo Cemetery.

== Awards and decorations ==
Arkhipov was awarded the following decorations:

- Hero of the Soviet Union (2)
- Order of Lenin (3)
- Order of the October Revolution
- Order of the Red Banner (5)
- Order of Kutuzov, 2nd class
- Order of the Patriotic War, 1st class
- Order of the Red Star
- Foreign awards
