= General Staff Building (Moscow) =

Coordinates: 55.751729°N 37.603253°E

- Здание Генерального штаба
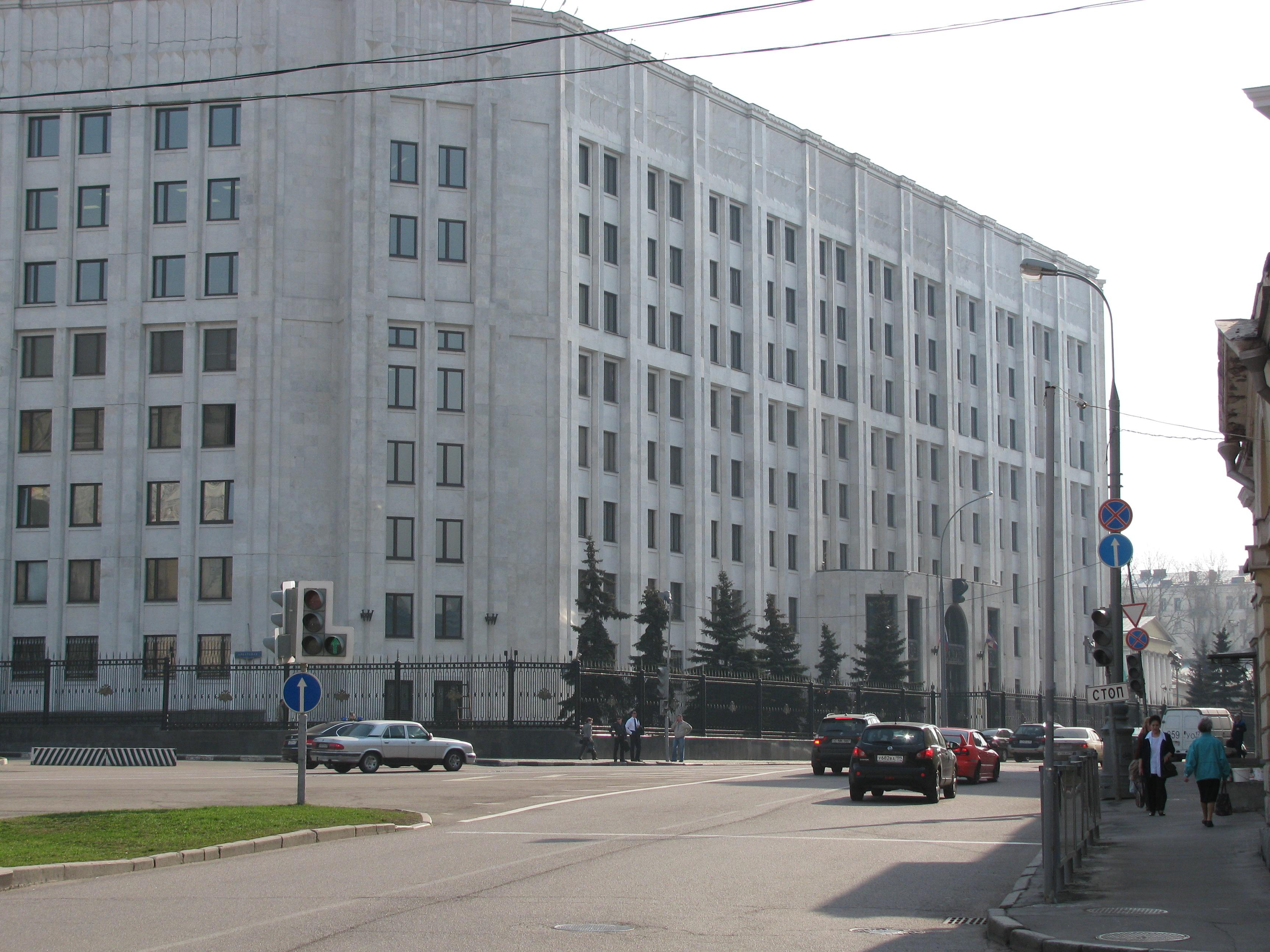
- Headquarters of the Russian General Staff in Autumn 2009
- Interactive map of the General Staff Building area

General information
- Status: Completed
- Location: Moscow, Russia, Znamenka 14/1, Moscow, Russia
- Current tenants: Russian General Staff
- Construction started: 1979
- Completed: 1987
- Owner: Russian Defence Ministry

Technical details
- Floor count: 8

The General Staff Building (Russian: Здание Генерального штаба, Zdanie General'nogo shtaba) is the headquarters of the General Staff of the Russian Armed Forces, situated on Arbatskaya Square in Central Administrative Okrug of Moscow, Russia.

The building was designed by Mikhail Posokhin who was the main architect of Moscow (1960–1982), and built in 1979–1987.

== History ==
To clear the place for the building, the buildings on Znamenka, Vozdvizhenka, and Arbatskaya Square were demolished. In particular, the house where Nikolai Rubinstein and Pyotr Tchaikovsky lived in their youth was destroyed, as well as the hotel where Sergei Rachmaninoff lived.

In the courtyard of the building is the ground lobby of the Moscow Metro station Arbatskaya of the Arbatsko-Pokrovskaya line. During the construction of the building, new exits from the lobby through the building were arranged towards Vozdvizhenka, and the old ones, to Arbatskaya Square, were closed.

== Architecture ==
The General Staff Building occupies an entire quarter. One of its facades faces Arbatskaya Square. The building has eight floors. The walls are decorated with marble, Ural stone – serpentine and granite. The facades have horizontal and vertical divisions. The architectural style as a whole is characteristic of Soviet administrative buildings of the 1960s–1970s, but also includes certain features of 1980s postmodernism in the decorative design of the portals and the design of the crowning part of the structure.

== See also ==
- Main Building of the Ministry of Defense (Russia) or Third Building of the Ministry of Defense
