= Arkadaksky District =

Arkadaksky District Аркадакский район (Russian)
- District
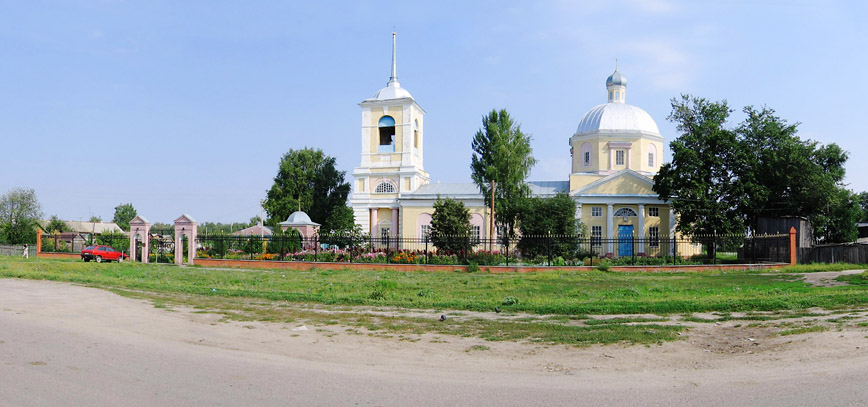
- Church on Ascension Day, Arkadak, Arkadaksky District

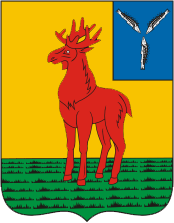
- Coat of arms
- Location of Arkadaksky District in Saratov Oblast
- Coordinates: 51°56′19″N 43°30′09″E
- Country: Russia
- Federal subject: Saratov Oblast
- Established: 23 July 1928
- Administrative center: Arkadak

Area
  - Total: 2,200 km^{2} (850 sq mi)

Population (2010 Census)
  - Total: 26,236
  - Density: 12/km^{2} (31/sq mi)
  - Urban: 49.0%
  - Rural: 51.0%

Administrative structure
  - Inhabited localities: 1 cities/towns, 57 rural localities

Municipal structure
  - Municipally incorporated as: Arkadaksky Municipal District
  - Municipal divisions: 1 urban settlements, 6 rural settlements
- Time zone: UTC+4 (MSK+1)
- OKTMO ID: 63603000
- Website: http://arkadak.sarmo.ru

Arkadaksky District (Russian: Аркада́кский райо́н) is an administrative and municipal district (raion), one of the thirty-eight in Saratov Oblast, Russia. It is located in the west of the oblast. The area of the district is 2,200 square kilometers (850 sq mi). Its administrative center is the town of Arkadak. Population: 26,236 (2010 Census); 31,131 (2002 census); 33,525 (1989 Soviet census). The population of Arkadak accounts for 49.0% of the district's total population.
