= 8th Directorate (Russian General Staff) =

8th Directorate of the General Staff
- Восьмое управление Генерального штаба Vosmoye upravleniye generalnogo shtaba
- Emblem
- Founded: 17 December 1959; 66 years ago
- Country: Russia (1992–present); Soviet Union (1959–1991)
- Branch: Russian Armed Forces
- Part of: Russian General Staff
- Garrison/HQ: Moscow
- Motto: Secretly for the benefit (Скрытно для пользы)
- Anniversaries: 7 October
- Website: [zgt.mil.ru Official website]

Commanders
- Supreme Commander-in-Chief: President Vladimir Putin
- Minister of Defense: Andrey Belousov
- Chief of the General Staff: Valery Gerasimov

The Eighth Directorate of the General Staff of the Russian Armed Forces (Russian: Восьмое управление Генерального штаба Вооружённых сил Российской Федерации) is a military command body of the General Staff of the Russian Armed Forces, heading the Service for the Protection of State Secrets of the Russian Armed Forces. It is responsible for providing the Ministry of Defense of the Russian Federation with the necessary information to carry out current tasks in command and control of the Russian Armed Forces. The 8th Directorate of the General Staff of the Armed Forces of the Russian Federation has been the successor to the Red Army's encryption agencies since 1941.

== History ==
At the same time, a special unit was formed within the Field Headquarters of the Revolutionary Military Council. Special agencies were then established within the Main Artillery Directorate, the Central Directorate of Military Communications, the Communications Directorate, the Supply Directorate, and several other directorates. By 1920, the system of protecting military secrets had reached the formations.

In 1926, the agency was transformed into the 2nd Department of the Administration of the People's Commissariat for Military and Naval Affairs, and in 1930, first into the 7th Department of the Red Army Headquarters, and then into the 8th, which remains under the Directorate today. The training of the Service's specialists was conducted at the Frunze Military Academy.

In 1939, the 8th Department of the Red Army General Staff was renamed the Special Service Department and incorporated into the Operations Directorate of the General Staff of the Red Army.

With the outbreak of the Great Patriotic War in 1941, the Special Service Directorate of the Red Army General Staff was created, with a total of 197 military personnel and 50 employees.

On October 7, 1941, the Directorate of the Cipher Service of the General Staff was officially renamed the Eighth Directorate of the General Staff.

On May 15, 2021, a ceremony to consecrate the standard of the Chief of the 8th Directorate of the General Staff was held at the Main Cathedral of the Russian Armed Forces.

On July 11, 2022, a bust of Lieutenant General Pyotr Belyusov, the founder of the Service for the Protection of State Secrets of the Russian Armed Forces, was unveiled at the Eastern Military District headquarters in Khabarovsk.

On November 11, 2022, a stamp was canceled in Moscow. Significance of the fact?] bearing a portrait of Lieutenant General Pyotr Belyusov, the founder of the Service for the Protection of State Secrets.

March 21, 2023, marked the 100th anniversary of the birth of Lieutenant General Nikolai Vasilyevich Storch, Chief of the 8th Directorate of the General Staff of the Soviet Armed Forces (1972–1988). Two underwater geographic features in the White and Barents Seas have been named after the heads of the 8th Directorate of the General Staff of the Soviet Armed Forces with the corresponding order was signed by Prime Minister of Russia, Mikhail Mishustin.

== Commanders ==
- Lieutenant General Pyotr Belyusov (1941–1961)
- Lieutenant General Aleksandr Ivanovich Cherpakov (1961–1972)
- Lieutenant General Nikolai Storch (1972–1988)
- Lieutenant General Valentin Nikolaevich Zemlyanitsyn (1988–1996)
- Lieutenant General Anatoly Vasilyevich Zadoroshchenko (1996–1999)
- Lieutenant General Valery Mikhailovich Khalansky (1999–2007)
- Lieutenant General Evgeny Nikolaevich Marusin (2007–2010)
- Lieutenant General Yuri Kuznetsov (2010–2023)
- Lieutenant General Andrey Viktorovich Kolovanov (2023–present)
