= Yevgeny Burdinsky =

Russian colonel general

Yevgeny Vladimirovich Burdinsky
- Евгений Владимирович Бурдинский
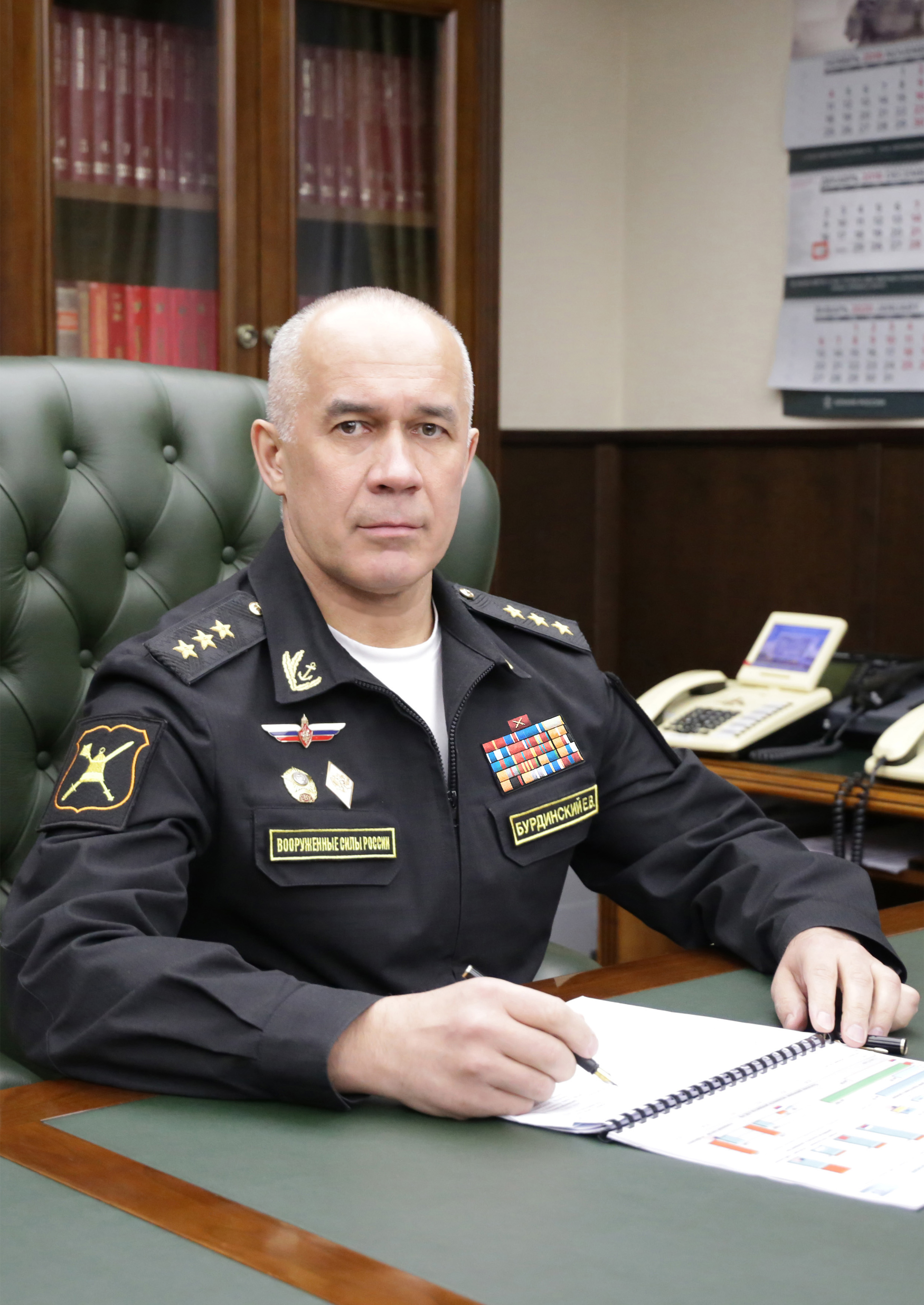
- Born: 25 August 1960 (age 66); Belogorsk, Amur Oblast, Soviet Union
- Alma mater: Frunze Military Academy; General Staff Academy
- Military career
- Allegiance: Russia
- Branch: Russian Armed Forces
- Rank: Colonel general
- Commands: Main Organizational and Mobilization Directorate of the General Staff
- Known for: Organizing Russian mobilization Oversight of Storm-Z units Re-establishing the Moscow Military District
- Conflicts: Russo-Ukrainian War

Yevgeny Vladimirovich Burdinsky (Russian: Евгений Владимирович Бурдинский; born 25 August 1960) is a Russian colonel general and director of the Main Organizational-Mobilizational Directorate of the General Staff of the Russian Armed Forces, who, during the Russian invasion of Ukraine was in charge of Russia's mobilization efforts.

== Biography ==
Burdinsky was born in Belogorsk, Amur Oblast, in the Soviet Far East, on 25 August 1960. After graduating from the Ussuriysk Suvorov Military School in 1977, he was accepted to the Far Eastern Higher Combined Arms Command School in Blagoveshchensk. After graduating from the school, he was sent to serve in the 336th Guards Naval Infantry Brigade of the Baltic Fleet at Baltiysk. With this unit, Burdinsky served as a platoon commander, company commander, tank battalion chief of staff, and naval infantry battalion commander. He was accepted to the Frunze Military Academy for advanced military education in 1994. Graduating in 1997, he was sent to the Main Organizational and Mobilization Directorate of the General Staff. Burdinsky was accepted to the Military Academy of the General Staff in 1999 for senior officer military education and after graduating in 2001 served in the Main Organizational and Mobilization Directorate as chief of a group, deputy chief of the conscription sector, and chief of the conscription sector from 2004, before rising to deputy chief of a sub-directorate.

Burdinsky served as chief of the organizational and mobilization directorate and deputy chief of staff of the Western Military District for organizational and mobilization work from 2009. He rose to become deputy and then first deputy chief of the Main Organizational and Mobilization Directorate between 2010 and 2018, being promoted to lieutenant general in 2015. Burdinsky was promoted to chief of the Main Organizational and Mobilization Directorate in March 2018, a position that also carries the title of one of the deputy chiefs of the General Staff. He was promoted to colonel general on 12 December 2019.

In preparation for the Russian invasion of Ukraine, Russia implemented a draft in August 2021 where Burdinsky was placed in charge of calling up 127,000 conscripts, organizing and training them for service in various sectors of the Russian Armed Forces. During the partial mobilization in 2022–2023, Burdinsky reported that 300,000 Russians had been drafted and as such two new military districts will need to be created, the restored Moscow and Leningrad military districts. This has been the largest draft in Russian history since WWII, with the last significant draft, for the Soviet–Afghan War, only calling up 55,000 conscripts.

From November 10, to December 2, 2022, Burdinsky led the effort to integrate the armies of the Donetsk People's Republic and the Luhansk People's Republic into the Russian Armed Forces. Additionally, using the People's Republics pre-existing commissariat systems, implemented general mobilization of their populations, conscripting 79,800 men from the region, as well as requisitioning 2,000 vehicles. This draft would be expanded to included Russian occupied Kherson and Zaporizhzhia Oblasts.

Burdinsky is also directly in charge of the Storm-Z penal military units consisting of volunteers drawn from Russian prisons on the promise of a reduced sentence. He was heavily criticized for his failure to directly control all the units during the Wagner Group rebellion, where several of the units proclaimed their loyalty to the Wagner group in their effort to topple the Russian military structure.

Due to his role in the war in Ukraine, Burdinsky was sanctioned by the European Union, and Switzerland.

== Decorations ==
Burdinsky is a recipient of the following decorations:

Order of Alexander Nevsky
Order of Military Merit
Order of Honor
Medal "For Battle Merit"
