= Arkadak =

Town in Saratov Oblast, Russia

Arkadak Аркадак
- Town
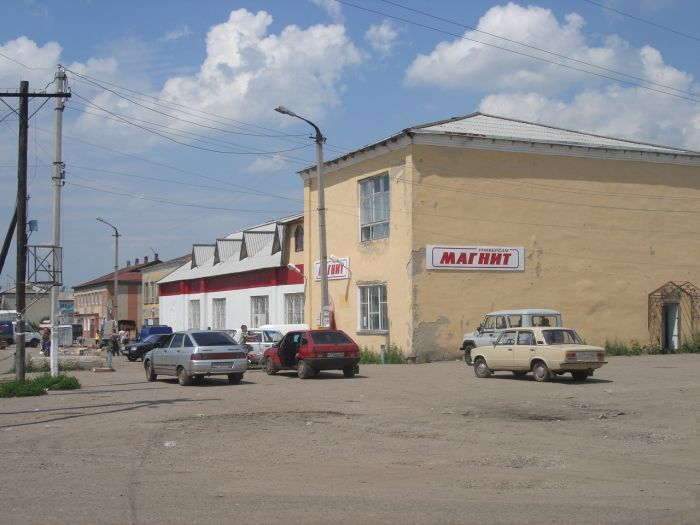
- In Arkadak

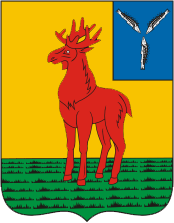
- Coat of arms
- Interactive map of Arkadak
- Location of Arkadak Arkadak (Saratov Oblast)
- Coordinates: 51°56′N 43°30′E
- Country: Russia
- Federal subject: Saratov Oblast
- Administrative district: Arkadaksky District
- Founded: 1721
- Town status since: 1963
- Elevation: 130 m (430 ft)

Population (2010 Census)
  - Total: 12,845
  - Estimate (2025): 10,477 (−18.4%)

Administrative status
  - Capital of: Arkadaksky District

Municipal status
  - Municipal district: Arkadaksky Municipal District
  - Urban settlement: Arkadak Urban Settlement
  - Capital of: Arkadaksky Municipal District, Arkadak Urban Settlement
- Time zone: UTC+4 (MSK+1)
- Postal codes: 412210, 412211
- Dialing code: +7 84542
- OKTMO ID: 63603101001

Arkadak (Russian: Аркада́к) is a town and the administrative center of Arkadaksky District in Saratov Oblast, Russia, located on the Bolshoy Arkadak River near its confluence with the Khopyor, 248 kilometers (154 mi) west of Saratov, the administrative center of the oblast. Population: 12,845 (2010 census); 14,438 (2002 census); 14,244 (1989 Soviet census).

== History ==
It was founded in 1721. Urban-type settlement status was granted to it in 1939; town status was granted in 1963.

== Administrative and municipal status ==
Within the framework of administrative divisions, Arkadak serves as the administrative center of Arkadaksky District, to which it is directly subordinated. As a municipal division, the town of Arkadak, together with one rural locality (the settlement of Krasny), is incorporated within Arkadaksky Municipal District as Arkadak Urban Settlement.

== Culture ==
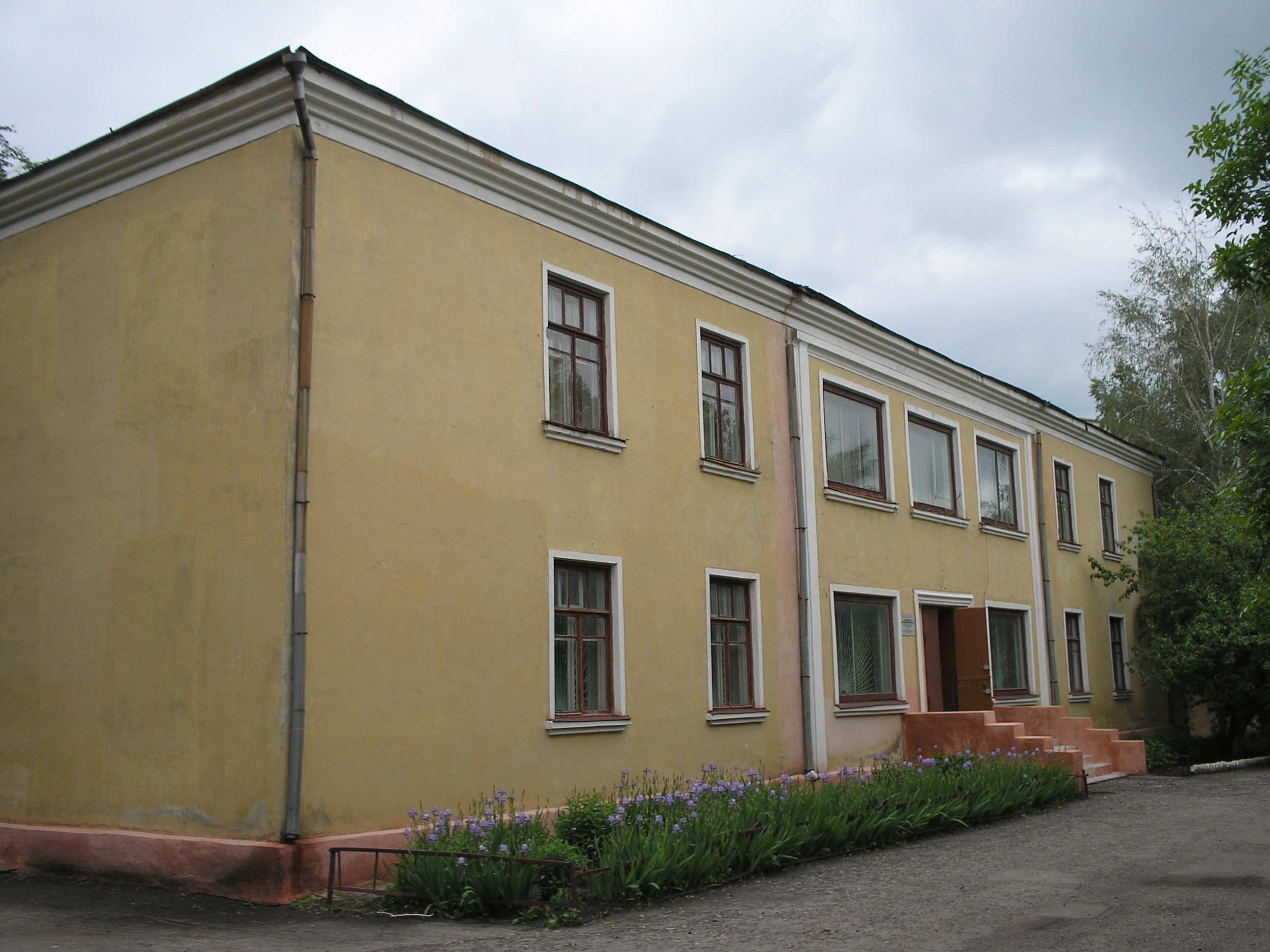
Ardak Museum

The town is home to the Arkadak Museum of local history, which was established in 1968.
