= Sergey Rudskoy =

Military officer of the Russian Federation

Sergei Fedorovich Rudskoy
- Серге́й Фёдорович Рудско́й
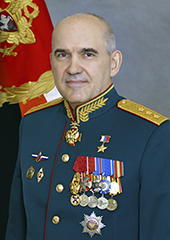
- Born: October 2, 1960 (age 65); Mykolaiv, Ukrainian SSR, Soviet Union
- Alma mater: Moscow Higher Combined Arms Command School
- Military career
- Allegiance: Soviet Union (till 1991) (Russia) Russian Federation
- Rank: Colonel General
- Conflicts: First Chechen War; Russian intervention in the Syrian civil war 2022 Russian invasion of Ukraine
- Awards: Hero of the Russian Federation (2020)

Sergei Fedorovich Rudskoy (Russian: Сергей Фёдорович Рудской; born 2 October 1960, Mykolaiv, Ukrainian SSR, Soviet Union) is a military officer of the Russian Federation who currently holds the rank of Colonel General. He has been the Chief of the Main Operational Directorate of the General Staff of the Armed Forces of the Russian Federation and First Deputy Chief of the General Staff since 24 November 2015. Due to Russia's invasion of Ukraine, he is subject to sanctions by the European Union, United Kingdom and Ukraine.. He was awarded the Hero of the Russian Federation in February 2020.

== Early life ==
Rudskoy was born on 2 October 1960 in Mykolaiv, Ukrainian SSR, Soviet Union. He was the son of the Hero of the Soviet Union Fyodor Andreevich Rudskoy[ru].

In 1981, he graduated from the Moscow Higher Combined Arms Command School. In 1995-1996, he was the commander of the 255th Motorized Rifle Regiment.

He participated in the Chechen War with the rank of lieutenant colonel, He was the commander of the 255th Guards Stalingrad-Korsun Motor Rifle Regiment.

He was promoted to the rank of Lieutenant-General in 2012 and Colonel General in 2017

== International sanctions ==
On 29th June 2022, the United Kingdom imposed sanctions against Rudskoy under the Syria (Sanctions) (EU Exit) Regulations 2019. The sanctions included asset freeze and listing on the UK sanctions list. The UK Government claimed that Rudskoy, as the Head of the Main Operational Directorate of the General Staff, was responsible for overseeing the Russian military forces in Syria and participating in supporting the Syrian Government’s military actions.

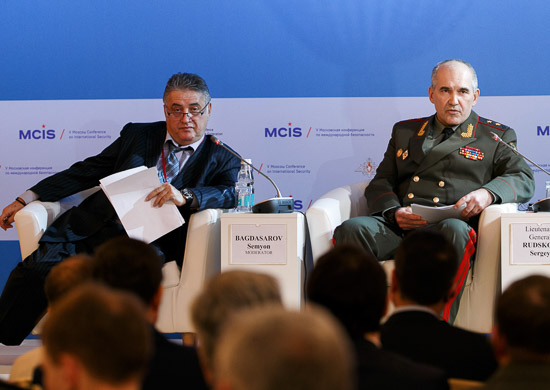
Sergey Rudskoy with State Duma member Semyon Bagdasarov

== War crimes in Ukraine ==
According to Human Rights Watch, during the Russian attack on Ukraine ,based on the principle of command responsibility, Rudskoy may be involved in the perpetration of war crimes during the battle and blockade of Mariupol, particularly for the attack, obstruction of humanitarian assistance and evacuation, and crimes against humanity.
