= Predgorny, Biysky District, Altai Krai =

Predgorny Предгорный
- Settlement
- Location within Altai Krai Location within Russia
- Coordinates: 52°29′N 85°40′E
- Country: Russia
- Region: Altai Krai
- District: Biysky District
- Time zone: UTC+7:00

Predgorny (Russian: Предгорный) is a rural locality (a settlement) in Srostinsky Selsoviet, Biysky District, Altai Krai, Russia. The population was 97 as of 2013. There are 2 streets.

== Geography ==
Predgorny is located 45 km southeast of Biysk (the district's administrative centre) by road. Srostki is the nearest rural locality.
