= Main Building of the Ministry of Defense (Russia) =

Building in Moscow, Russia

- Третий дом Министерства обороны
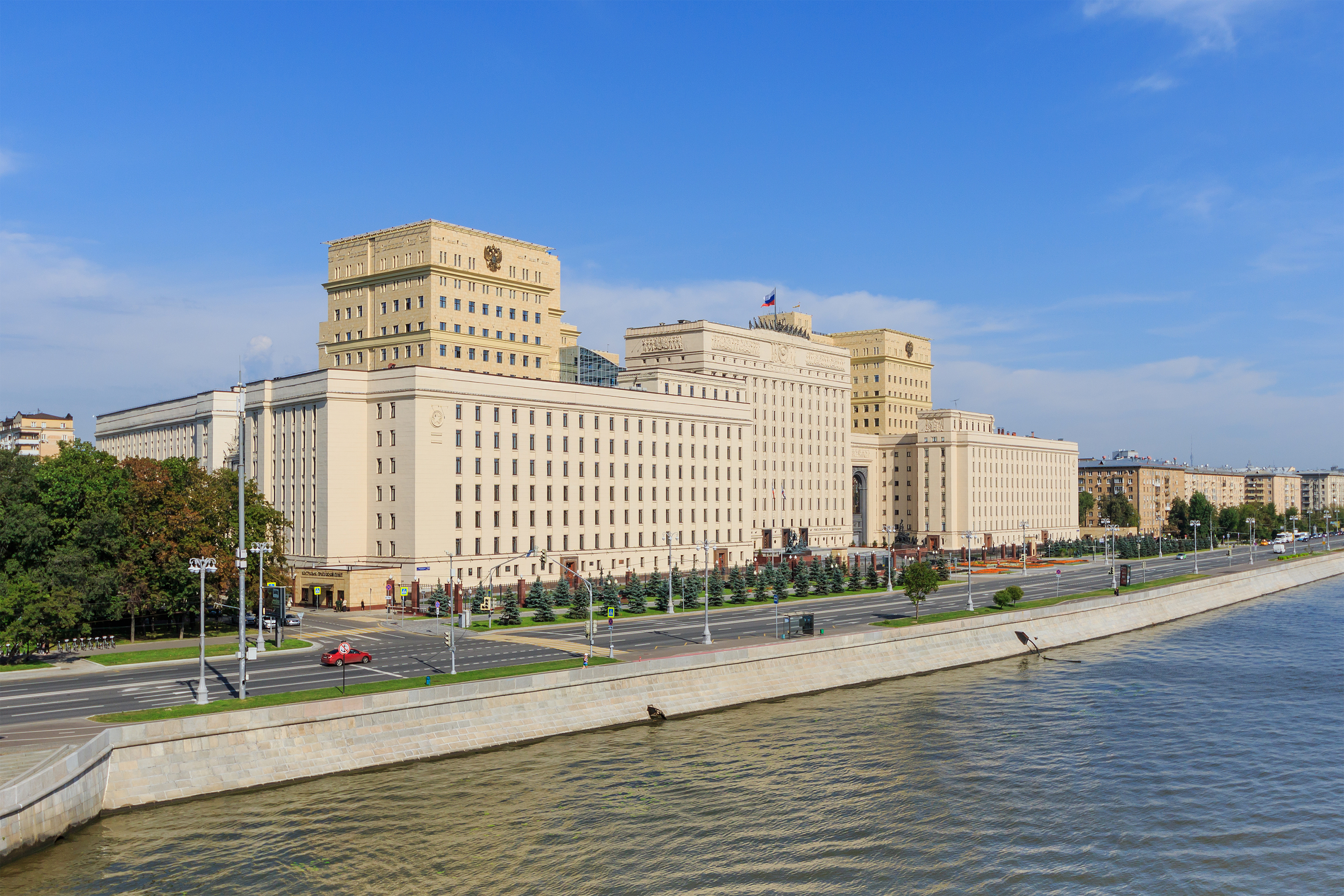
- The headquarters in 2016
- Interactive map of the Main Building of the Ministry of Defense area

General information
- Status: Completed
- Location: Moscow, Russia, Frunzenskaya Embankment, 22
- Coordinates: 55°43′40″N 37°35′22″E
- Construction started: 1940
- Completed: 1951
- Owner: Russian Defense Ministry

The Main Building of the Ministry of Defense is the headquarters of the National Defense Management Center of the Russian Armed Forces. It is situated on Frunzenskaya Embankment in Moscow, Russia.

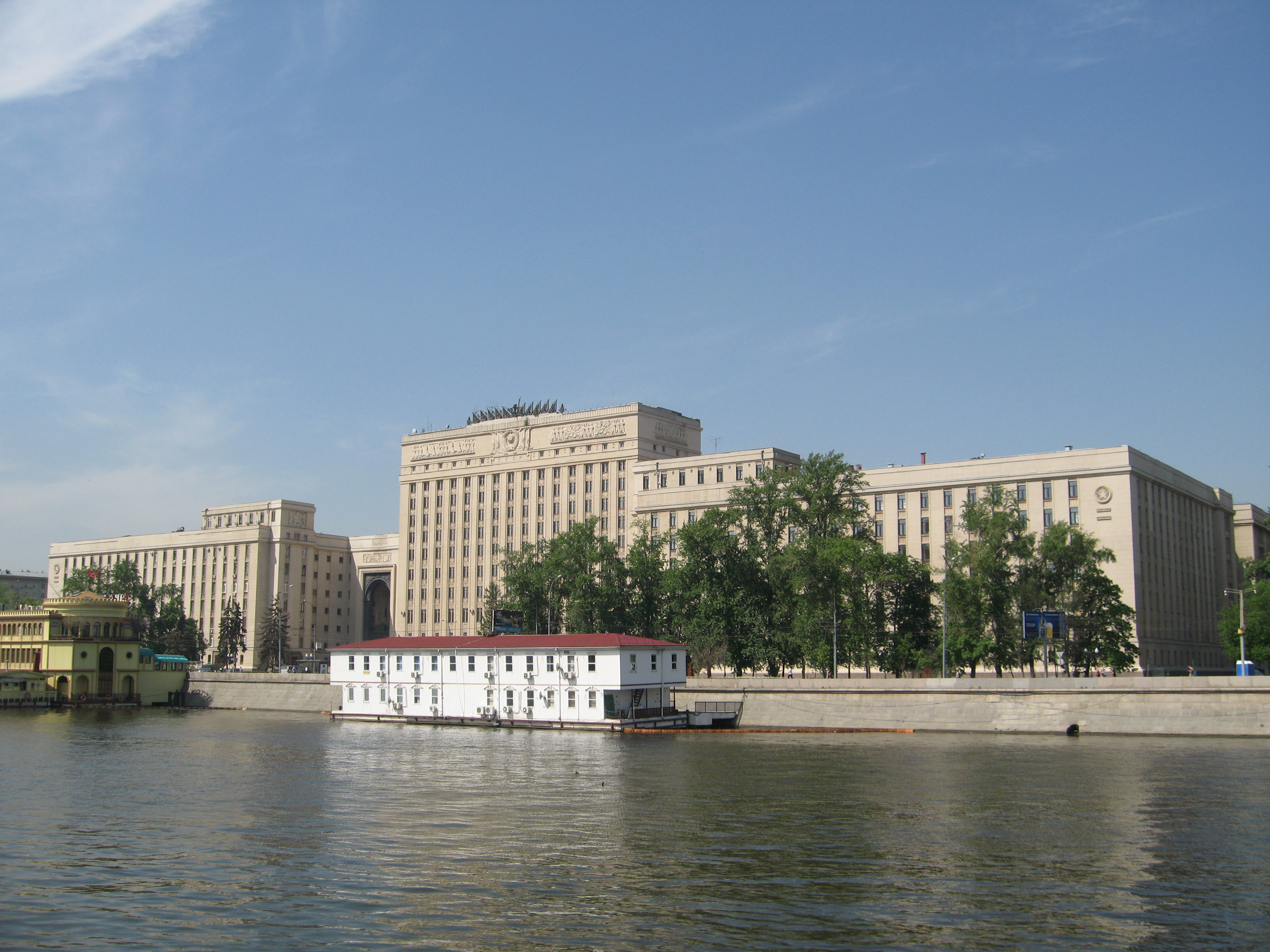
2008 (before the 2014 additions)

The building was designed by Russian architect Lev Rudnev. Ground was broken for construction in 1940, and the building was dedicated in 1952. Additional buildings were added to the complex in 2014.

== See also ==
- Lobanov-Rostovsky Palace, Czarist equivalent
- General Staff Building (Saint Petersburg)
