= Unmanned Systems Forces of Russia =

Branch of the Russian military

Unmanned Systems Forces
- Войска беспилотных систем
- Medium emblem of the Unmanned Systems Forces
- Founded: 12 November 2025
- Country: Russia
- Role: Drone warfare
- Size: 114,000 active personnel (est. May 2026)
- Part of: Russian Armed Forces
- Engagements: Russo-Ukrainian war (2022–present)

Commanders
- Supreme Commander-in-Chief: President Vladimir Putin
- Minister of Defence: Andrey Belousov
- Commander of the Unmanned Systems Forces: Colonel General Denis Lyamin
- Deputy Commander of the Unmanned Systems Forces: Polkovnik Sergey Ishtuganov

Insignia
- Flag

- Patch

- Great emblem

- Small emblem

The Unmanned Systems Forces (Russian: Войска беспилотных систем [ВБС], romanized: Voyska bespilotnykh sistem [VBS]) is a branch of the Russian Armed Forces dedicated to drone warfare. It was established on 12 November 2025.

The Unmanned Systems Forces conduct drone warfare using unmanned military drones on land, sea, and air. The establishment of the VBS is a formal recognition by the Russian military of the centrality of drone warfare and autonomous systems in contemporary conflicts, as well as Russian efforts to reorganise training, force structure, development, and provisioning related to drone warfare.

== History ==
The idea of establishing a separate branch of the Russian military dedicated to unmanned system dates back to 16 December 2024. Minister of Defence Andrey Belousov stated on that occasion that the branch would be established in the third quarter of 2025, with a scope beyond the unmanned aerial vehicles (UAV). In June 2024, Ukraine had already created its own Unmanned Systems Forces as drone warfare became a central facet of the Russo-Ukrainian war.

According to the Institute for the Study of War, Russia began creating separate drone military units as early as late January 2025, with the first drone regiment being presented at the 2025 Moscow Victory Day Parade. In June 2025, Russian President Vladimir Putin called for a rapid development of the unmanned systems branch.

On 12 November 2025, the deputy head of the Unmanned Systems Forces, Polkovnik Sergey Ishtuganov announced that the branch had completed its formation and is fully operational.

According to BBC Russia, the branch is commanded by Lieutenant Colonel Yuri Vaganov, a former businessman and one of the main suppliers of FPV drones to the Russian military.

According to Russian military journalist Dmitry Steshin, the establishment of the Unmanned Systems Forces happened more quickly than other branches, having built on the progress made by DPR and LPR People's Militias.

Kyiv-based defence reporter Kollen Post links the establishment of the Unmanned Systems Forces as a separate branch to the attempt of the Russian military to organise under a more efficient system various autonomous, and spontaneous, units and industrial initiatives which sprang up in the earlier periods of the Russo-Ukrainian war.

In February 2026, Izvestia reported that formations of regiments of unmanned systems had been established in all five military districts. Regiments vary in their purpose, with tasks such as reconnaissance, strike and medical evacuation.

In July 2026, Deputy Minister of Defense Alexei Krivoruchko said that in the first half of 2026, only 8,000 recruited specialists had completed training, falling short of the reported target of 34,400 recruits that would need to be recruited in the first semester to fulfill the end-year target of 78,800 recruits.

On 5 August 2026, President Vladimir Putin announced that Denis Lyamin would be the new commander of the VBS, replacing Yuri Vaganov, as part of "refinement" of the military structure.

== Structure ==
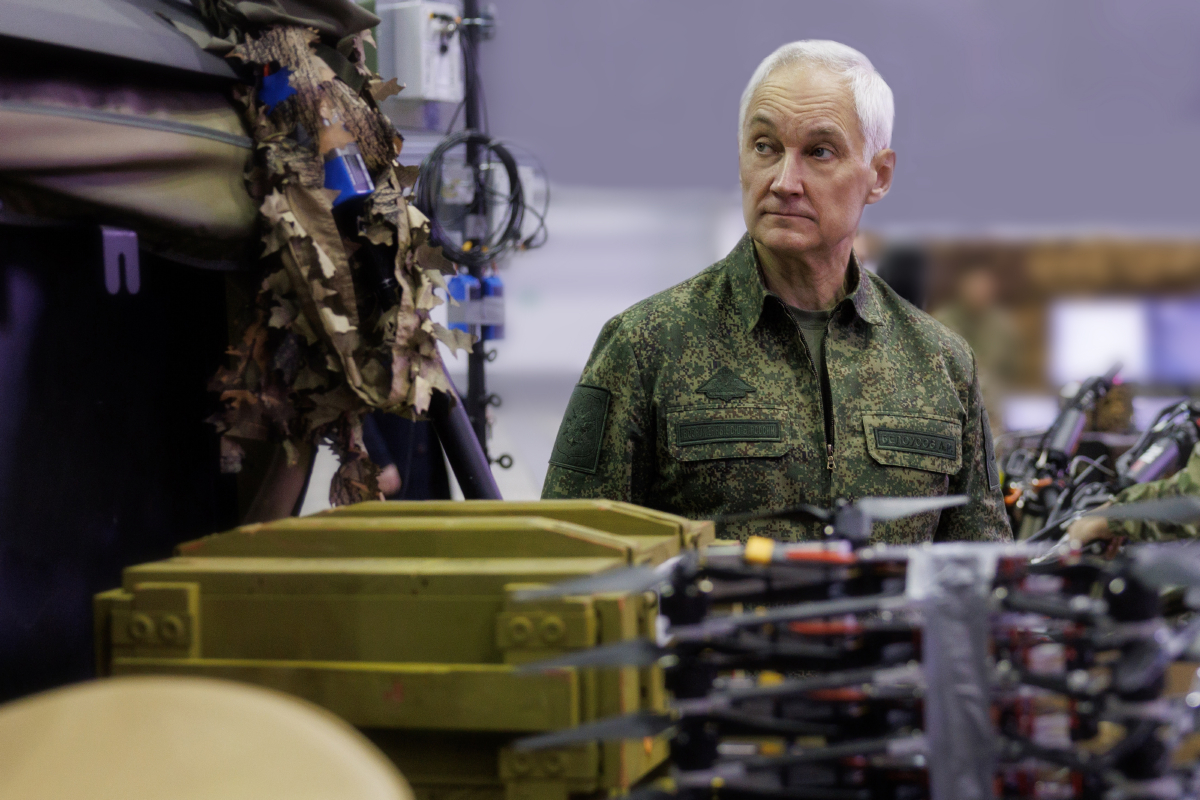
Russian Defence Minister Andrei Belousov inspects equipment of the Center for Advanced Unmanned Technologies "Rubicon".

In the Russian military, the Unmanned Systems Forces are classified as a combat arm (rod), similar to Motor Rifle or Coastal Troops, rather than a service branch (vid), such as the Ground Forces or the Navy. Units of the Unmanned Systems Forces may be attached to units of the Ground Forces, Navy or Airborne Forces on a dynamic basis. According to Colonel Sergey Ishtuganov, the VBS includes fully organised regiments, units, and a designated command structure. A Higher Military School of Unmanned Systems is to be established in 2026.

A driving factor behind the service branch is the coordination of the development, production and employment of unmanned systems, in a move away from a large number of heterogenous products, to the mass deployment of a selected number of highly scalable systems.

Center for Advanced Unmanned Technologies "Rubicon" is the premier unit of the branch.

=== Active units ===
- 1st Separate Battalion of Unmanned systems
- 2nd Separate Battalion of Unmanned systems
- 3rd Separate Battalion of Unmanned systems
- 6th Separate Battalion of Unmanned systems
- 11th Separate Battalion of Unmanned systems
- 15th Separate Battalion of Unmanned systems
- Luhansk Separate Battalion of Unmanned systems
- 7th Separate Reconnaissance-strike Regiment of Unmanned systems of the Central Military District
- 65th Separate Regiment of Unmanned systems of the Leningrad Military District
- 71st Separate Regiment of Unmanned systems of the Moscow Military District
- 75th Separate Regiment of Unmanned systems of the Southern Military District
- 77th Separate Regiment of Unmanned systems of the Eastern Military District
- Separate Regiment of Unmanned systems "Burevestnik"
- 50th Separate Unmanned Systems Brigade "Varyag"
- Separate Unmanned Systems Brigade GROM "Cascade"
- 924th State Center for Unmanned systems
- Center for Advanced Unmanned Technologies "Rubicon"
- Special Purpose Center "Bars-Sarmat" (formerly BARS Volunteer Detachment "Sarmat")
- Hermes unit

=== Command ===
Commander

- Lieutenant Colonel Yuri Vaganov (2025—2026)
- Colonel General Denis Lyamin (2026—present)

Deputy Commander

- Colonel Sergey Ishtuganov (2025—present)

== Personnel ==
As of November 2025, the size of the branch was estimated at around 10,000–20,000 servicemen. On 6 January 2026, Ukrainian Commander-in-Chief Oleksandr Syrskyi claimed that the Russian Unmanned Systems Forces "already number" 80,000 servicemen with plans to expand to 165,500 servicemen by sometime in 2026 and further expand to nearly 210,000 servicemen by 2030. In early February 2026, the Russian Unmanned Systems Forces was reported to number 87,000 servicemen. By early May 2026, Ukrainian forces estimated that VBS personnel had increased to 114,000.

In May 2026, BBC Russia reported that a 23-year old student who had signed a contract with the branch had been killed in occupied Luhansk less than three months after starting his military service, marking the first confirmed death of a student recruited in Russia's university mobilisation campaign.

== Equipment ==
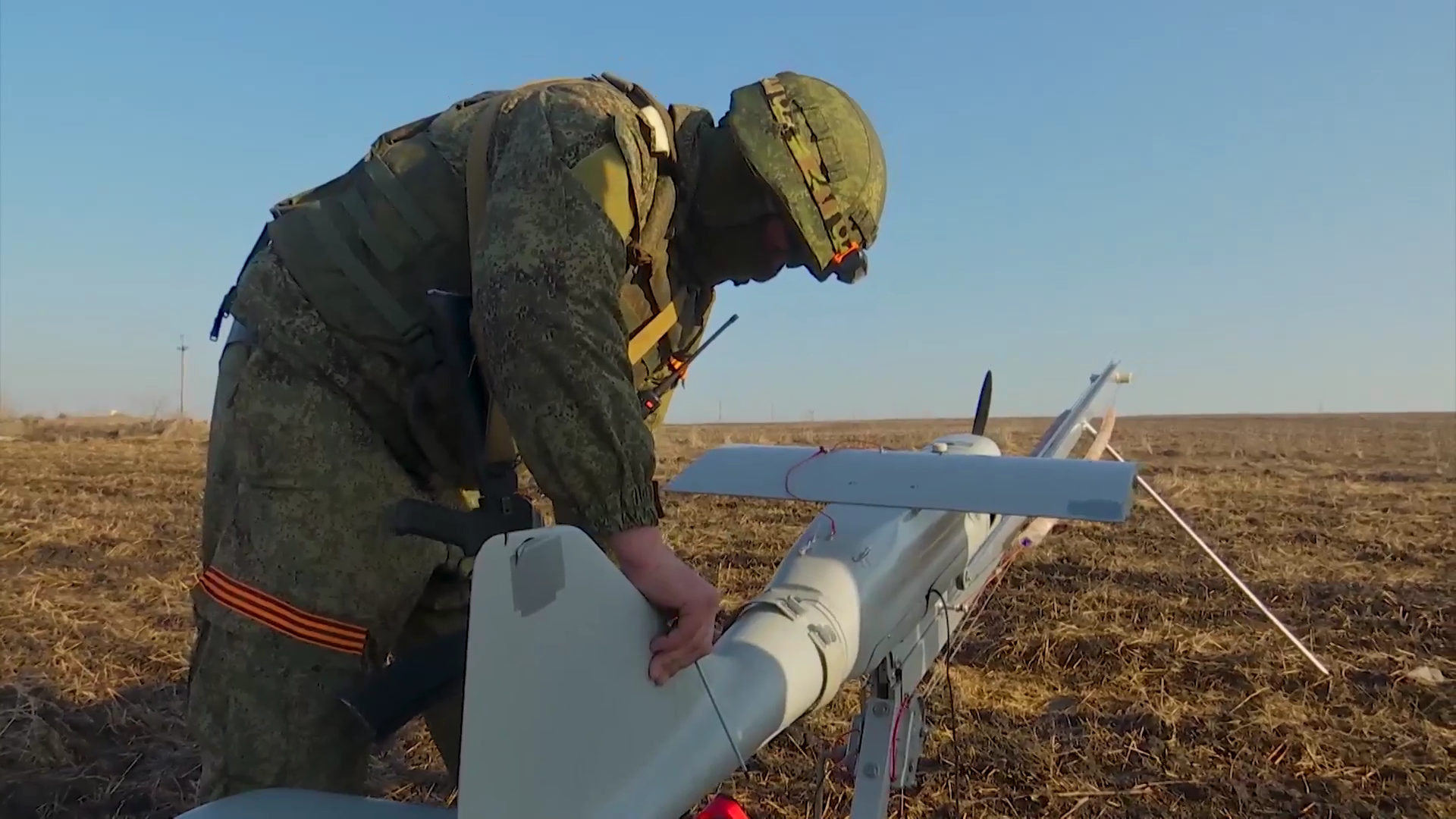
Russian soldier prepares an Orlan-10 UAV

The VBS are designed to integrate various types of unmanned systems into a single organisational structure, tasked with performing several combat missions. The VBS are primarily equipped with unmanned aerial vehicles (both FPV and fiber-optic drones), but also with ground unmanned systems and unmanned boats. Notable aerial drones include Kinzhal counter-unmanned aerial systems (C-UAS), Geran-2, Geran-5 & Volk-18 (for Veterok 7 Pro launch site protection).

=== Operations ===
VBS operational doctrine emphasizes the mass deployment of FPV assets alongside specialized point-defense for ground units and near-daily launching of long-range drones. In 2025, VBS planned to produce a monthly average of 166,000 FPV drones and 2,500 long‑range and decoy drones. Russian officials later claimed they had already tripled their planned 2025 production volume by mid‑year.

== See also ==
- Unmanned Systems Forces of Ukraine
