= 58th Guards Combined Arms Army =

Russian Ground Forces formation

58th Army (1st Formation) (Nov. 1941 – Aug. 1942) 58th Army (2nd Formation) (Aug. 1942 – Oct. 1943) 58th Army (3rd Formation) (1995 – present)
- 58-я армия
- Great emblem of the 58th Combined Arms Army
- Active: 1941–present
- Country: Soviet Union; Russia (present)
- Branch: Red Army; Russian Ground Forces (present)
- Type: Field army
- Size: several corps or divisions
- Part of: Kalinin Front (June 1942 - August 1942); Transcaucasian Front (August 1942 - ?); North Caucasus Military District (1995–2010); Southern Military District (2010–present)
- Garrison/HQ: Vladikavkaz
- Engagements: World War II; Chechnya insurgency; Second Chechen War; Beslan school siege; Russo-Georgian War; Russian-Ukrainian War; Russo-Ukrainian war (2022–present); Battle of Hlukhiv; 2023 Ukrainian counteroffensive

Commanders
- Notable commanders: Vladimir Shamanov; Anatoly Khrulyov; Ivan Popov

The 58th Guards Combined Arms Army (Russian: 58-я гвардейская общевойсковая армия) is an army of the Russian Ground Forces, headquartered at Vladikavkaz, North Ossetia-Alania, within Russia's Southern Military District. It was formed in 1941 as part of the Soviet Union's Red Army and has been part of the Russian Army since 1995. It has the Military Unit Number (в/ч) is 47084.

== World War II ==
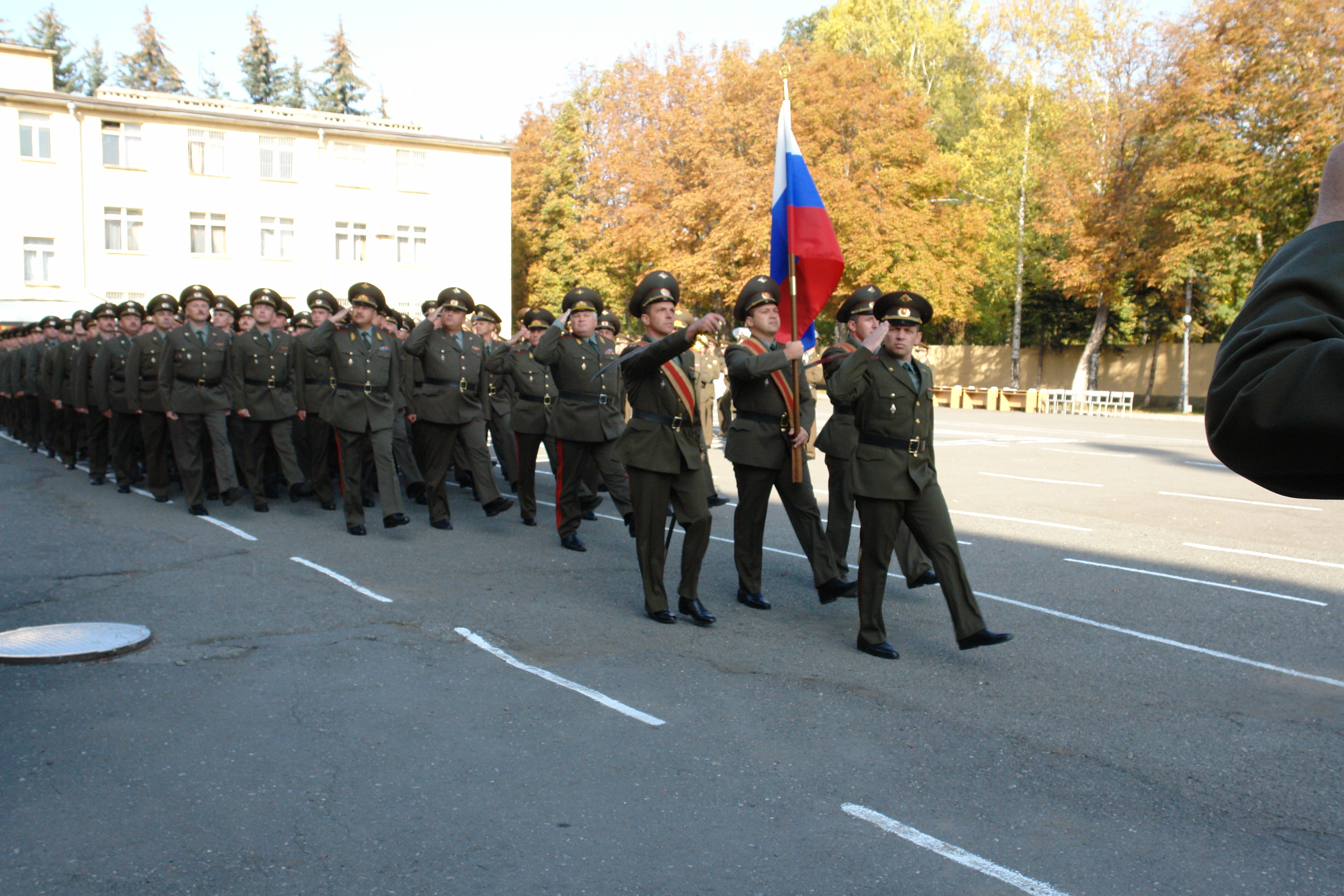
Personnel of the directorate of the 58th Combined Arms Army.

It was first formed in the Siberian Military District in November 1941, including the 362nd, 364th, 368th, 370th, 380th, and 384th Rifle Divisions and the 77th Cavalry Division and moved to the Arkhangelsk Military District, but then the Army was redesignated the 3rd Tank Army in May 1942. It was reestablished within the Kalinin Front in June 1942, and in July included the 16th and 27th Guards Rifle Divisions, the 215th and 375th Rifle Divisions, the 35th and 81st Tank Brigades, and other support units.

It was reformed in the Transcaucasian Front from the 24th Army on 28 August 1942, under General Vasily Khomenko of the NKVD. Much of its senior cadre also came from the NKVD, and among its missions was to keep order in the Caucasus, particularly in the Groznyi and Makhachkala regions. This was because of a Chechen uprising that had gone on since 1941 (see 1940-1944 Chechnya insurgency). 58th Army later joined the North Caucasus Front. On 1 November 1942 it consisted of the 271st and 416th Rifle Division, and the Makhachkala Division of the NKVD. Prior to the North Caucasus Front putting its main effort into the Kerch-Eltigen Operation (November 1943) the Army HQ was reorganised as Headquarters Volga Military District in October 1943.

=== Commanders ===
- Vasily Kuznetsov (November 1941)
- Nikolai Moskvin (November 1941 – May 1942)
- Aleksei Zygin (June – August 1942)
- Vasily Khomenko (September – November 1942)
- Kondrat Melnik (November 1942 – October 1943)

=== Chief of Staff ===
- Yakov Dashevsky (Mаrch 1943)

== Second Chechen War (1999–2000) ==
The headquarters was reformed in 1995 in the North Caucasus Military District from the 42nd Army Corps at Vladikavkaz. The 42nd Army Corps had been formed in August 1982. During the Second Chechen War, the Army was commanded by then Lieutenant General Vladimir Shamanov, who was succeeded by army chief of staff and first deputy commander Major General Valery Gerasimov.

=== Beslan school siege ===
In 2004, units from the 58th provided assistance with armoured vehicles to the forces involved storming the school on the third day of the Beslan school siege.

== Russo-Georgian War (2008) ==
On 3 August 2008, five battalions of the Russian 58th Army were moved to the vicinity of Roki Tunnel that links Georgia's breakaway South Ossetia with Russia's North Ossetia.

On 8 August 2008 the 58th Army crossed the border into Georgia and engaged in combat against Georgian forces, most notably in the city of Tskhinvali. Its then-commander, Lieutenant General Anatoly Khrulyov was wounded in action.

== War in Donbas (2014–22) ==
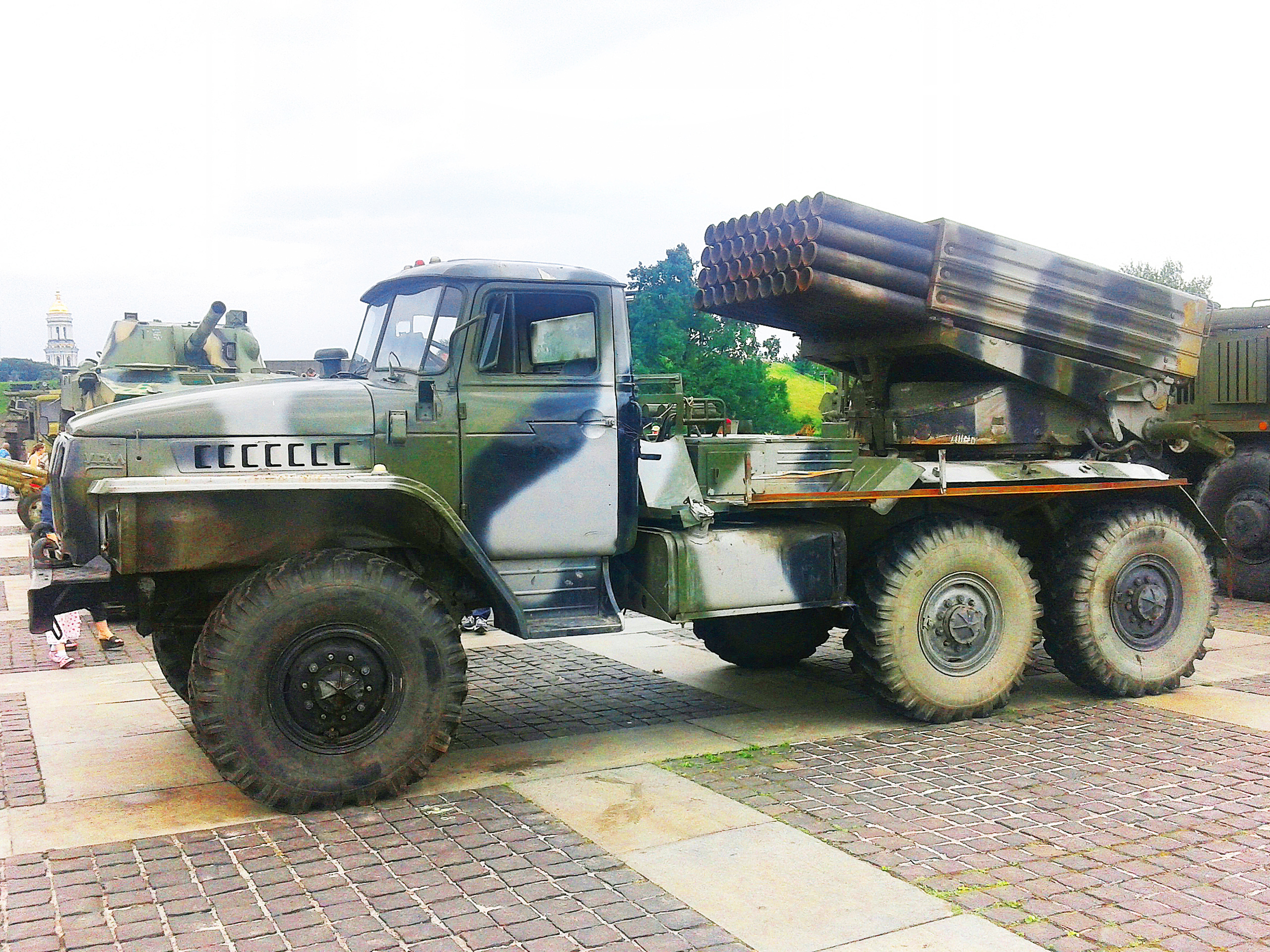
BM-21 "27777" launch vehicle at display in Kyiv 2014.

In June 2014 Ukrainian troops captured a damaged BM-21 Grad launcher, which the Ukrainians identified as equipment of the 58th Army of the Russian Federation.

Major general Sergey Kuzovlev became commander of the army on 18 August 2016. In late 2016 the Russian Ministry of Defense announced that the 42nd Guards Motor Rifle Division had been reformed from the 8th Guards Mountain Motor Rifle Brigade, the 17th Guards Motor Rifle Brigade, and the 18th Guards Motor Rifle Brigade. In January 2017, 20th Guards Army commander Major general Yevgeny Nikiforov replaced Kuzovlev.

== Russian invasion of Ukraine (2022–present) ==
On the eve of the Russian invasion of Ukraine, it was reported that the headquarters of the 58th Army had deployed to Crimea commanding between 12 and 17 battalion tactical groups. Once the invasion commenced, units of the 58th Army took part in hostilities on the southern front of the war.

About 300 South Ossetian soldiers of 4th Guards Military Base were reported in late March to have refused to return to combat after five days on the frontline in Ukraine, and instead gone back to South Ossetia.

On 11 July 2023, the 58th Army headquarters in Berdiansk, Zaporizhzhia Oblast was destroyed by a missile strike. Among those reportedly killed was Lieutenant-General Oleg Tsokov, the deputy commander of the Russian Southern Military District, making him the highest ranking Russian officer killed during the invasion.

On 12 July 2023, the army commander, Major General Ivan Popov, was removed from his post. In a Telegram message posted by a Russian MP, he claimed to have been fired by Defence Minister Sergei Shoigu after complaining about inadequacies in logistics that led to high casualties among his men and accusing his superiors of treason. Popov was replaced by Lieutenant General Denis Lyamin.

On 26 September 2023, the unit was awarded the "Guards" honorific for its defense of the southern front during the 2023 Ukrainian counteroffensive.

On 24 April 2026, six Ukrainian FP-2 drones struck a command post of the 58th Guards Combined Arms Army in Kadiivka.

== Structure ==
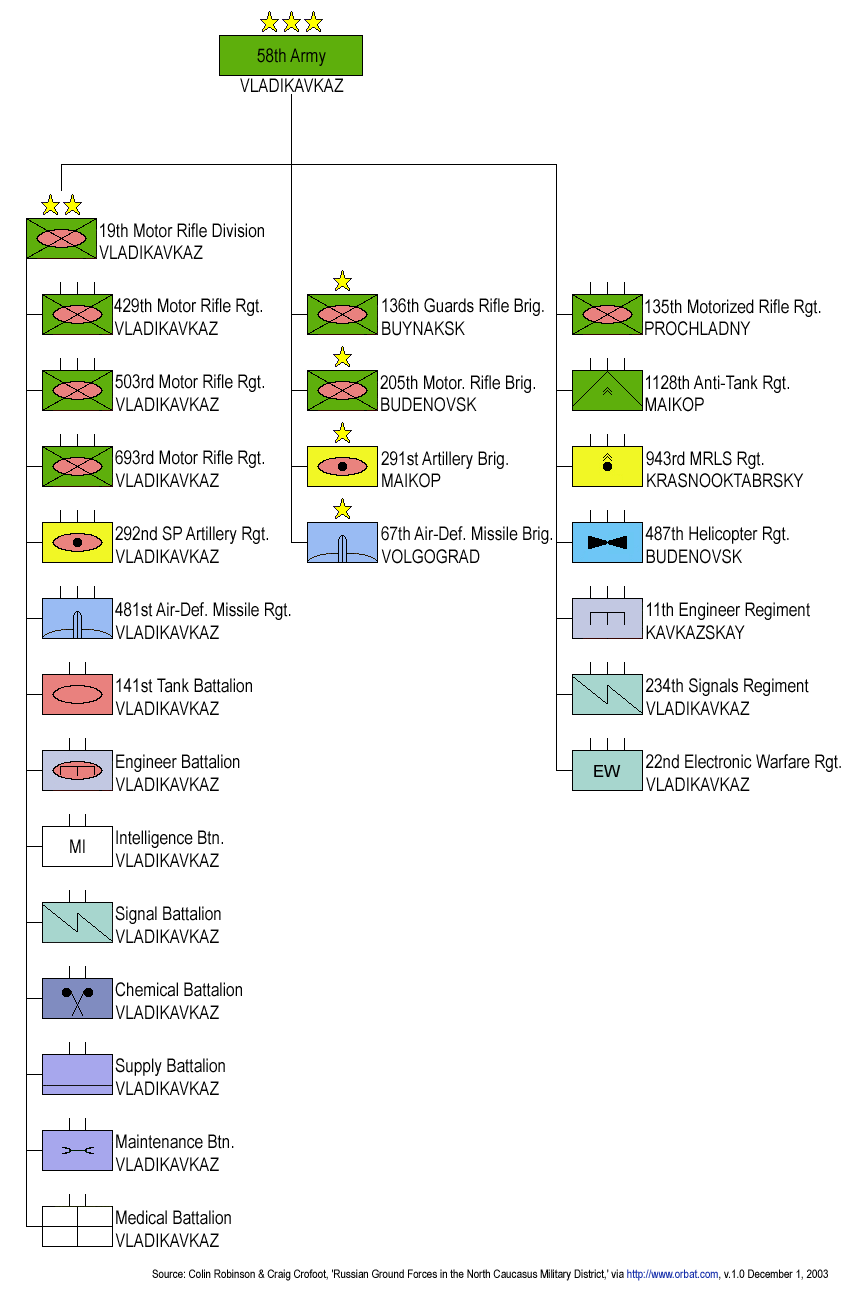
Structure of 58th Combined Arms Army in 2003.

=== 2013 ===
The Army operates in close coordination with the 4th Air Force and Air Defence Army of the district, and includes:

- 42nd Motor Rifle Division – Khankala and Kalinovskaya in the Chechnya
- 19th Motor Rifle Division – Vladikavkaz
- 205th Separate Motorized Rifle Brigade – Budyonnovsk
- 136th Guards Separate Motorized Rifle Brigade – Buynaksk, Dagestan
- 135th Separate Motorized Rifle Regiment – Prochladny, Kabardino-Balkaria
- 291st Separate Artillery Brigade – Maikop – (equipped with 2A65)
- 943rd Multiple Rocket Launcher Regiment – Krasnooktabrsky (Uragan 220mm MRL)
- 1128th Anti-Tank Regiment – Maikop
- 67th Separate Anti-Aircraft Rocket Brigade (SAM) – Volgograd area (SA-11 'Buk' SAM)
- 487th Separate Helicopter Regiment (Mi-8/Mi-24) – Budyonnovsk
- 11th Separate Engineer Regiment – Kavkazskay
- 234th Separate Signals Regiment – Vladikavkaz
- 22nd Separate Regiment of Electronic Warfare- Vladikavkaz

=== 2016 ===
- 8th Guards Mountain Motor Rifle Brigade – Borzoy
- 17th Guards Motor Rifle Brigade – Shali
- 18th Guards Motor Rifle Brigade – Khankala and Kalinovskaya, Chechnya
- 19th Motor Rifle Brigade – Vladikavkaz
- 20th Guards Motor Rifle Brigade – Volgograd
- 136th Guards Motor Rifle Brigade – Buynaksk
- 291st Artillery Brigade – Troitskaya

=== 2023 ===
PP-2005 pontoon bridge of the 78th Logistic Support Brigade. 31 January 2020.

- 19th Motor Rifle Division (upgraded from brigade to division-level strength in 2020; Vladikavkaz) (в/ч 20634)
  - 429th Motor Rifle Regiment (в/ч 01860)
  - 503rd Motor Rifle Regiment (в/ч 75394)
- 42nd Guards Motor Rifle Division (Khankala, Shali, Kalinovskaya, Borzoy in Chechnya) (в/ч 27777)
  - 70th Motor Rifle Regiment (в/ч 71718)
  - 71st Motor Rifle Regiment (в/ч 16544)
  - 270th Motor Rifle Regiment "Akhmat-Kavkaz"
  - 291st Motor Rifle Regiment (в/ч 65384)
  - 1251st Motor Rifle Regiment
  - 50th Self-Propelled Artillery Regiment (в/ч 53185)
  - 150th Separate Anti-Tank Artillery Battalion (в/ч 24566)
  - 245th Separate Anti-Aircraft Missile Battalion (в/ч 81510)
- 136th Guards Motor Rifle Brigade (Buynaksk in Dagestan) (в/ч 63354)
- 1429th Motor Rifle Regiment
- 12th Guards Missile Brigade (Mozdok) (в/ч 25788)
- 67th Anti-Aircraft Missile Brigade (Vladikavkaz) (V/Ch 32383, formed 1967, ru:67-я зенитная ракетная бригада)
- 291st Artillery Brigade (Troitskaya) (в/ч 64670)
- 100th Reconnaissance Brigade (Mozdok–7) (в/ч 23511)
- 4th Guards Military Base (Java and Tskhinvali in South Ossetia) (в/ч 66431)
- 34th Headquarters Brigade (Vladikavkaz)
- 40th NBC Protection Regiment (Troitskaya)
- 31st Engineer Sapper Regiment (Prokhladny)
- 78th Logistic Support Brigade (Budyonnovsk) (в/ч 77192)
- 14th Electronic Warfare Battalion (Vladikavkaz)

== Commanders ==
- Lieutenant General Gennady Troshev (May 1995–July 1997)
- Lieutenant General Anatoly Sidyakin (July 1997–August 1999)
- Lieutenant General Vladimir Shamanov (August 1999–December 2000)
- Major General Valery Gerasimov (February 2001–March 2003)
- Lieutenant General Viktor Sobolev (March 2003–April 2006)
- Lieutenant General Anatoly Khrulyov (4 April 2006–6 May 2010)
- Major General Andrey Kartapolov (7 May 2010–30 January 2012)
- Major General Andrey Gurulyov (30 January 2012–August 2016, lieutenant general 2014)
- Major General Sergey Kuzovlev (August 2016–January 2017)
- Major General Yevgeny Nikiforov (January 2017–February 2019, lieutenant general 12 December 2018)
- Major General Sergey Ryzhkov (February 2019–September 2020)
- Lieutenant General Mikhail Zusko (September 2020–2022)
- Major General Ivan Popov (2022–July 2023)
- Lieutenant General Denis Lyamin (July 2023–October 2023)
- Major General Sergey Medvedev (October 2023–November 2025, lieutenant general 2 May 2024)

== Notes ==
- V.I. Feskov; Golikov V.I.; K.A. Kalashnikov; S.A. Slugin (2013). Вооруженные силы СССР после Второй Мировой войны: от Красной Армии к Советской (часть 1: Сухопутные войска) [The Armed Forces of the USSR after World War II, from the Red Army to the Soviet (Part 1: Land Forces)]. Tomsk. Improved version of 2004 work with many inaccuracies corrected.
