= Denis Lyamin =

Russian lieutenant general

- Денис Лямин
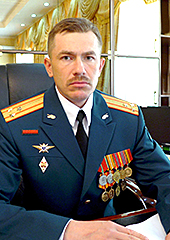
- Lyamin in 2016
- Born: 19 May 1979 (age 47); Slutsk, Byelorussian SSR, Soviet Union
- Military career
- Allegiance: Russia
- Branch: Russian Ground Forces
- Service years: 1996–present
- Rank: Colonel General
- Commands: Unmanned Systems Forces of Russia; 58th Guards Combined Arms Army; 90th Guards Tank Division; 201st Military Base
- Conflicts: Russian intervention in the Syrian Civil War; Russo-Ukrainian War; Russian invasion of Ukraine

Colonel General Denis Igoryevich Lyamin (Russian: Денис Игоревич Лямин; born 19 May 1979) is a Russian military officer who has commanded the Unmanned Systems Forces of Russia since 2026. He was previously the chief of staff of the Central Military District from 2023 to 2026, and briefly commanded the 58th Combined Arms Army in 2023.

== Biography ==
Denis Igoryevich Lyamin was born on 19 May 1979 in Slutsk, Belorussian SSR, the son of a soldier. His father was soon transferred to Chebarkul, where Lyamin completed his secondary education. He was admitted to the Chelyabinsk Higher Tank Command School in 1996. After his graduation in 2001, he served as a platoon commander, company commander, deputy battalion commander, and battalion commander in Chebarkul. He saw combat and was wounded.

Lyamin was admitted to the Combined Arms Academy in 2005, graduating in 2007. From September 2009, he served as chief of staff of the 28th Separate Motor Rifle Brigade of the Central Military District. In November 2011 he was transferred to the Western Military District to serve as chief of staff and deputy commander of the 6th Separate Tank Brigade of the 20th Guards Combined Arms Army. Lyamin rose to chief of staff and deputy commander of the newly reformed 2nd Guards Motor Rifle Division in April 2013. He was appointed commander of the 201st Military Base in Tajikistan on 2 January 2015.

Lyamin returned to Russia to command the newly reformed 90th Guards Tank Division of the Central Military District in December 2016. Lyamin entered the Military Academy of the General Staff in September 2017 and after his graduation in June 2019 was appointed chief of staff and first deputy commander of the 58th Combined Arms Army of the Southern Military District in August. Lyamin became temporary commander of the 22nd Army Corps in Crimea in November 2020 and was confirmed in this position in June. Lyamin remained in command of the corps until October.

Lyamin was given command of the 58th Combined Arms Army on 11 July 2023, replacing Ivan Popov, who was dismissed after he criticized the Russian battlefield strategy and put forward concerns for his troops fighting without rest. Since October 2023, he was the Chief of Staff and First Deputy Commander of the Central Military District.

On 5 August 2026, he became commander of the Unmanned Systems Forces of Russia.

Military offices
Preceded by ???	Commander of the 90th Guards Tank Division; 2016–2017	Succeeded by Vyacheslav Gurov
Preceded by Konstantin Kastornov	Commander of the 22nd Army Corps; Acting; 2020–2021	Succeeded by Arkady Marzoyev
Preceded by Ivan Popov	Commander of the 58th Guards Combined Arms Army; 2023	Succeeded by Sergey Medvedev
