= 7th Separate Reconnaissance-strike Regiment of Unmanned systems =

Russian Armed Forces drone warfare unit

- 7-й отдельный разведывательно-ударный полк беспилотных систем
- Regimental sleeve insignia
- Active: 2025–present
- Country: Russia
- Branch: Unmanned Systems Forces
- Role: Drone warfare
- Size: 1,342 personnel
- Part of: Unmanned Systems Forces
- Garrison/HQ: Poroshino, Sverdlovsk Oblast
- Equipment: See infra

The 7th Separate Reconnaissance-strike Regiment of Unmanned Systems Forces (Russian: 7-й отдельный разведывательно-ударный полк беспилотных систем) is a drone warfare unit of the Unmanned Systems Forces of the Russian Armed Forces.

== History ==
According the U.S.-based Institute for the Study of War, the establishment of the 7th Separate Regiment as a UAV regiment were first reported in April 2024 by Ukraine-based Victory Drones.

The Regiment was paraded for the first time on 2025 Moscow Victory Day Parade.

== Organisation ==
The 7th Separate Regiment has been established within the Central Military District and it is based in Sverdlovsk Oblast. The target strength is of 1,342 personnel.

The 7th Regiment includes one four battalions: one UAV strike battalion and three UAV Reconnaissance-and-strike battalions. Command units, as well as logistics support units such as signal, medical, and repair elements, also exist.

According to the Ukraine-based outlet Militarnyi, the Regimental structure includes 102 UAV crews, with the ratio of strike crews being at 40% (41 crews) and the recon crews being the 60% (61 crews).

== Equipment ==
According to the available information, the 7th Separate Regiment is equipped with:

- ZALA Lancet attack UAV (33 crews)
- SuperCam photography/commercial UAV (33 crews)
- STC Orlan-10 reconnaissance UAV (16 crews)
- ENICS Eleron-3 reconnaissance UAV (8 crews)
- ZALA Kub-BLA attack UAV (6 crews)
- Kalashnikov Quazimachta reconnaissance UAV (4 crews)
- Geran-2 attack UAV (2 crews)

== See also ==
- Unmanned Systems Forces (Russia)
