= 136th Separate Guards Motor Rifle Brigade =

136th Guards Uman-Berlin, Apsheron Red Banner Orders of Suvorov, Kutuzov and Bogdan Khmelnitsky Motor Rifle Brigade
- Russian: 136-я гвардейская мотострелковая Уманьско-Берлинская, Апшеронская Краснознамённая, орденов Суворова, Кутузова и Богдана Хмельницкого бригада
- 136th Separate Guards Motor Rifle Brigade shoulder sleeve insignia (text transliteration: Umansko-Berlinskaja)
- Active: 1993–present
- Country: Russia
- Branch: Russian Ground Forces
- Type: Motorized Infantry
- Size: Brigade
- Part of: 58th Army
- Garrison/HQ: Buynaksk, Dagestan
- Equipment: T-90A, BMP-3, BTR-82A, GAZ Tigr, 2S12 Sani, 2S3 Akatsiya, 9M133 Kornet, 9K114 Shturm-S, BM-21 Grad, 9A34(35) Strela-10, 2S6M Tunguska, 9A331 Tor-M1, ZSU-23-4
- Engagements: First Chechen War; War of Dagestan; Second Chechen War; War in Donbas; Russian invasion of Ukraine
- Decorations: Guards; Order of the Red Banner; Order of Suvorov; Order of Kutuzov; Order of Bogdan Khmelnitsky
- Battle honours: Apsheron

Commanders
- Current commander: Colonel Roman Geradotovich Demurchiev

The 136th Guards Uman-Berlin, Apsheron Red Banner Orders of Suvorov, Kutuzov and Bogdan Khmelnitsky Motor Rifle Brigade is a mechanised infantry brigade of the Russian Ground Forces.

On December 1, 1993, the 136th Motor Rifle Brigade was established at Buynaksk, Dagestan. In 1996-97, the brigade was merged with the 204th Guards Motor Rifle Regiment "Uman-Berlin" as the 136th Guards Motor Rifle Brigade. The 204th Guards Motor Rifle Regiment was transferred to the North Caucasus Military District at some point during the transformation of the 94th Guards Motor Rifle Division, returning from the Group of Soviet Forces in Germany, to become the 74th Guards Motor Rifle Brigade in the Siberian Military District.

On December 21-22, 1997, the Islamic extremist Ibn al-Khattab and his followers attacked the location of the unit in Buynaksk.

Plans from 2018 to upgrade the brigade to division status had apparently not completed by 2022, unlike the 19th Motor Rifle Brigade which was reestablished as a division in 2020.

== War in Ukraine ==
The 136th Guards Motor Rifle Brigade conducted combat operations in Luhansk Oblast, Ukraine, in 2014, during the war in Donbas.

The brigade took part in the Russian invasion of Ukraine, operating north-east of Crimea on the southern front. Reportedly, the brigade's chief of staff, Colonel Viktor Ivanovich Isaykin, was killed in the first days of the war.

On 30 September 2024, the brigade was awarded with the honorary designation "Apsheron".

On 5 January 2026, the brigade's commander, Colonel Eric Selimov, was killed in a car crash in occupied Luhansk region.

== Subordinated units ==
The brigade comprises, among other units, a tank battalion, three motor rifle battalions, artillery, and engineers.

== Equipment ==
The division's principal vehicles starting with MBTs T-90A, infantry fighting vehicle and armoured personnel carrier are BMP-3, BTR-82A, GAZ Tigr. Self propelled and towed artillery. 9M133 Kornet, 9K114 Shturm-S, 2S3 Akatsiya BM-21 Grad and 2S12 Sani. Anti-Aircraft Missile systems and vehicles include 9A34(35) Strela-10, 2S6M Tunguska, 9A331 Tor-M1 and ZSU-23-4.
