= GROM "Cascade" =

- Russian: ГРОМ «Каскад», romanized: GROM "Kaskad"
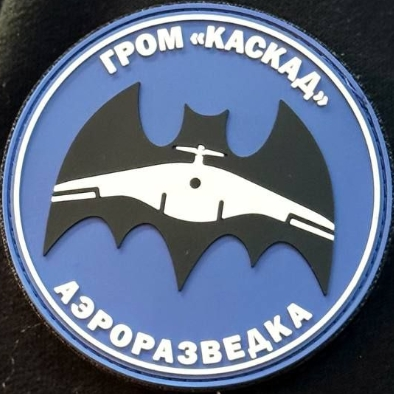
- Military sleeve badge
- Active: 2023 – present
- Country: Russia
- Branch: Unmanned Systems Forces of Russia

GROM "Cascade" (Russian: ГРОМ «Каскад», romanized: GROM "Kaskad") is a unit of the Unmanned Systems Forces of Russia.
