= Andrey Gurulyov =

Russian politician (born 1967)

Andrey Gurulyov MP
- Андрей Гурулёв
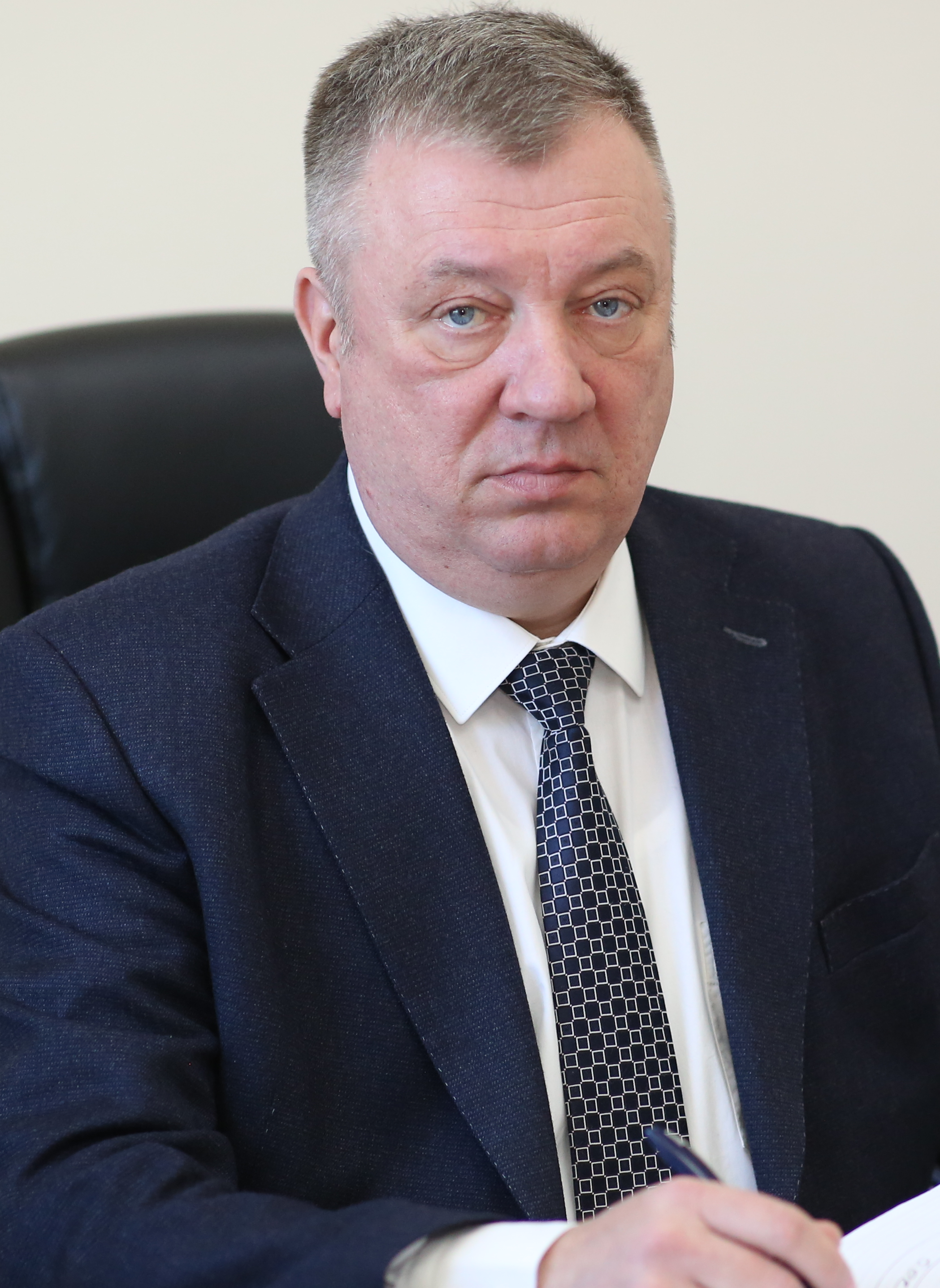
- Gurulyov in 2020

Member of the State Duma
- Incumbent
- Assumed office 12 October 2021
- Constituency: Party list

Deputy Governor of Zabaykalsky Krai
- In office 18 February 2019 – 28 September 2021
- Governor: Aleksandr Osipov

Personal details
- Born: 16 October 1967 (age 59) Moscow, RSFSR, USSR
- Party: United Russia
- Education: MVOKU; OVA RF Armed Forces; VAGSH RF Armed Forces; RANEPA

Military service
- Allegiance: Soviet Union; Russian Federation
- Branch/service: Soviet Ground Forces; Russian Ground Forces
- Years of service: 1984-2019
- Rank: Lieutenant General
- Commands: 5th Guards Tank Division; 58th Army
- Battles/wars: Second Chechen War; Syrian Civil War

Andrey Viktorovich Gurulyov (Note: surname also transliterated as Gurulev) (Russian: Андрей Викторович Гурулёв; born 16 October 1967) is a Russian politician and former army officer who is currently a member of the State Duma for the United Russia faction since 21 September 2021, and a former deputy Commander of the Southern Military District of the Russian military from 2016 to 2017.

== Biography ==
=== Military career ===
Gurulyov graduated from the Moscow Higher Combined Arms Command School in 1988, beginning his active service in July of that year as a weapons and equipment training platoon commander at the 469th District Training Center in Kuybyshev. He was transferred to the Western Group of Forces in Germany in June 1991, and his unit was withdrawn to Samara in 1994. Gurulyov entered the Combined Arms Academy in July 1998, and was sent to gain combat experience in the Second Chechen War in 1999. Returning to the academy, he graduated in 2000 and in June of that year was appointed chief of staff of the 382nd Motor Rifle Regiment of the 122nd Guards Motor Rifle Division at Dauriya. He was transferred to serve as chief of staff of the 272nd Motor Rifle Regiment of the 131st Guards Motor Rifle Division at Borzya in June 2001. Gurulyov became commander of this regiment in June 2002 and rose to serve as 131st Division chief of staff at Yasnaya in December 2003. He was appointed commander of the 5th Guards Tank Division at Kyakhta in March 2006, and promoted to major general in 2007. Gurulyov commanded the division until June 2008, after which he entered the Military Academy of the General Staff, and on graduation in 2010 was appointed chief of staff of the 58th Combined Arms Army of the Southern Military District, and in January 2012 was appointed commander of the same army.

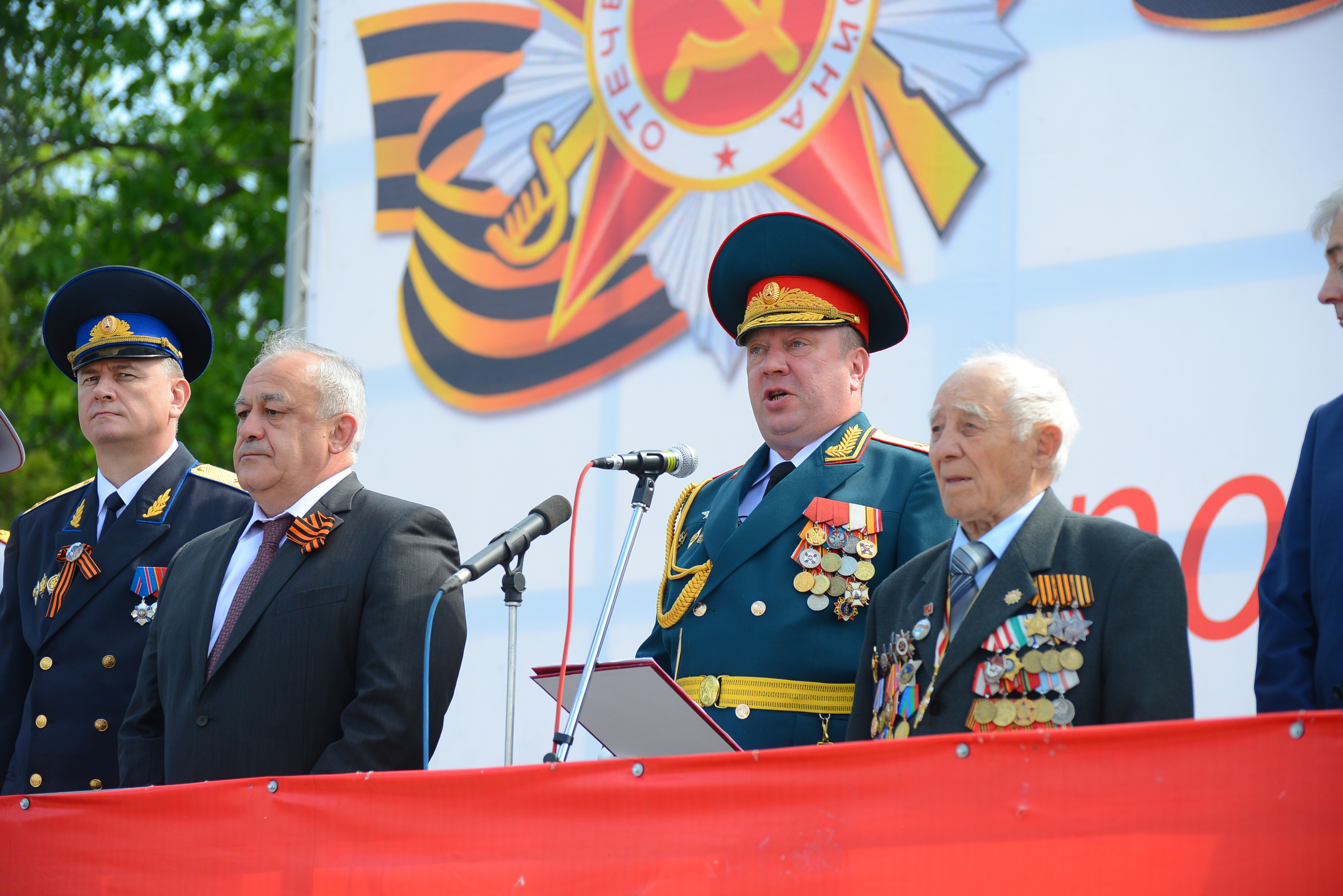
Gurulyov with a World War II veteran in Vladikavkaz, the capital of North Ossetia–Alania, on 9 May 2013

In 2013 he was charged with abuse of power after forging orders and putting two conscripts into "labor slavery". The charges were dropped in 2014 because of the statute of limitations. Allegedly the object of the scheme was to furnish Lieutenant general Nikolai Pereslegin with servants and Pereslegin's daughter, whose company actively participates in bidding and receives government contracts, furnished the appropriate cover with the civilian labour authorities.

In 2014-15 Gurulyov was responsible for the 12th reserve command, whose sphere of activities under the 58th was to increase the territory of the Luhansk People's Republic and the Donetsk People's Republic.

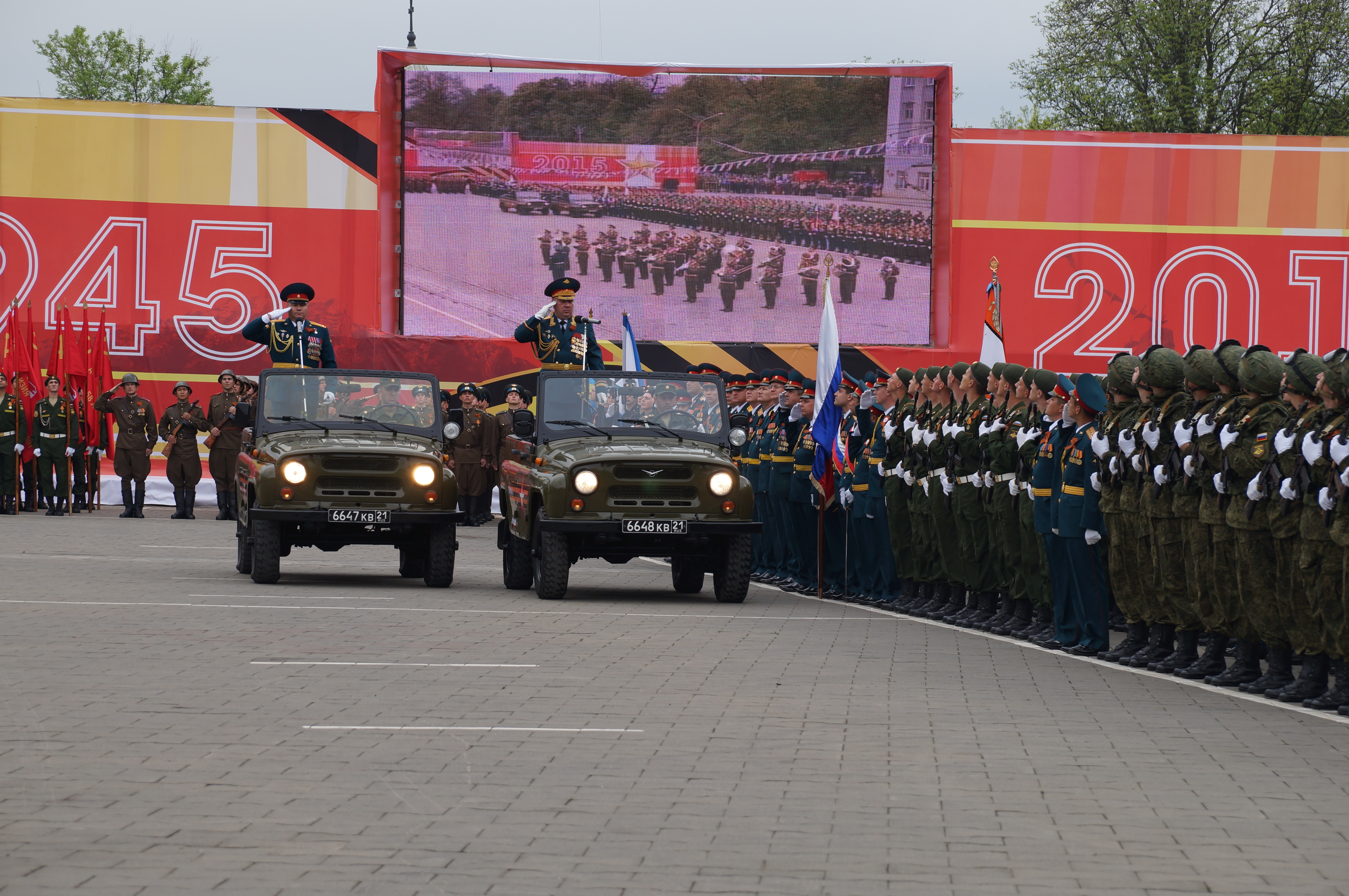
Gurulyov on 9 May 2015

From August 2016 to January 2019, Gurulyov served as Deputy Commander of the Southern Military District, and took part in the Russian military intervention in the Syrian civil war.

=== Administrative and political career ===
In 2019 he left the military service and was appointed Deputy Governor of Zabaykalsky Krai.

Since September 2021, he has served as a deputy of the 8th State Duma for Putin's United Russia party.

During the 2022 Russian invasion of Ukraine, he made it clear that in case of a world war, Russia would bomb London before Warsaw, Paris or Berlin.

In 2022 in an intercepted telephone conversation at 8:00 on 28 February 2022 he yearned to

Burn them, damn it, burn [the Ukrainians]! Once you’ve thrown them out of there – finish the house, burn it down! Spit at that f*cking humanism!

On 30 August 2022, Gurulyov "encouraged Putin's regime to launch missile strikes on the British Isles", and said that "would be the end of the British Crown."

On 2 October 2022, he was talking about "system of lies going from top to bottom" and was suddenly disconnected from Skype.

On 18 December 2022, he claimed that a negotiated settlement in Russia's war in Ukraine is impossible because "it’s a war for survival, for the survival of civilisation, for the survival of our Russia, but not just of Russia – of the countries around us too."

In April 2023, he came up with the idea that Putin's regime should reintroduce the Stalinist terror of the 1930s against the "enemies of the people" inside Russia.

On 26 May 2023, he suggested that Russia doesn't need to attack the US state Texas, and should instead focus on Alaska.

In response to the Wagner Group rebellion, Gurulyov said: "I am firmly convinced that during wartime, traitors have to be destroyed! Today, no matter who says what, whatever fairy tales they are telling, a bullet to the forehead is the sole salvation for Yevgeny Prigozhin."

In July 2023, Gurulyov published a voice message by Major General Ivan Popov, who commanded the 58th Combined Arms Army. The general claimed that he had been dismissed after describing the situation at the front to his superiors.

In September 2023, he wrote on Telegram: "Victory is separated from us only by one serious problem of ours — lies. Yes, there is less of it than there was at the beginning of the special military operation, but it is there. False reports, unfortunately, lead to poor decisions at many levels. It is there, let's admit it and fight it, otherwise it will be a disaster."

In October 2023, on the public television channel Russia-1, Gurulyov called for the isolation and extermination of all Russian citizens who disagree with the policies of Vladimir Putin.

On 6 April 2024, he suggested that Kazakhstan might be the next target for Russian attack after Ukraine.

In June 2024, he suggested that Russia should attack the Netherlands with nuclear weapons in order to harm energy supply to Europe.

In August 2024, Ukrainian forces crossed the border into Kursk Oblast during the ongoing Russian invasion of Ukraine resulting in part of the oblast becoming under Ukrainian occupation. Gurulyov criticized the Russian army for failing to defend Kursk Oblast. On 8 August, he said in a television interview that the Russian military knew about the planned Ukrainian invasion of Kursk a month before it happened but "from the top came the order not to panic, and that those above know better."

In June 2026, Gurulyov wrote a long post on Telegram, saying that Russia was running the risk of losing the war against Ukraine if measures to counter Ukraine's advancements in drone warfare were not immediately and effectively countered. Gurulyov painted a picture of the Russian military and political administration as doing too little, too late against newly emerging threats and changing circumstances, taking half-measures in face of anticipated problems, and lying in reports to make the situation seem better than it was in reality. Crucially, Gurulyov claimed that the Russian leadership had "in principle already made the decision" to launch a new general mobilisation in the fall (autumn) of 2026, which he criticised; it would only lead to higher losses of soldiers as long as the problem of enemy drones was not solved first. Given that throughout the war ("special military operation"), the Russian leadership had been very keen to avoid the impression that a general mobilisation would be implemented that might see "ordinary Russians" sent to the front, and keep potential plans of doing so secret, this statement by Gurulyov was highly controversial, causing his Telegram post to go viral and received a lot of international press attention and social media backlash. Gurulyov subsequently deleted his post, claiming in a Max message that his account had been hacked.

In an interview also published in June 2026 Gurulyov admitted that in the role of commander of the "separatist pro-Russian forces" he gave orders to shell an Orthodox church during war in Donbas in 2014, in which civilians were killed. He also called to bomb Kyiv "so that there's no water, no electricity, no sewage, nothing at all".

=== Sanctions ===
Gurulyov was sanctioned by the UK government in 2022 in relation to the Russo-Ukrainian War.

Gurulyov is one of the members of the State Duma the United States Treasury sanctioned on 24 March 2022 in response to the 2022 Russian invasion of Ukraine.
