= Ivan Popov (major general) =

Russian general (born 1975)

- Иван Попов
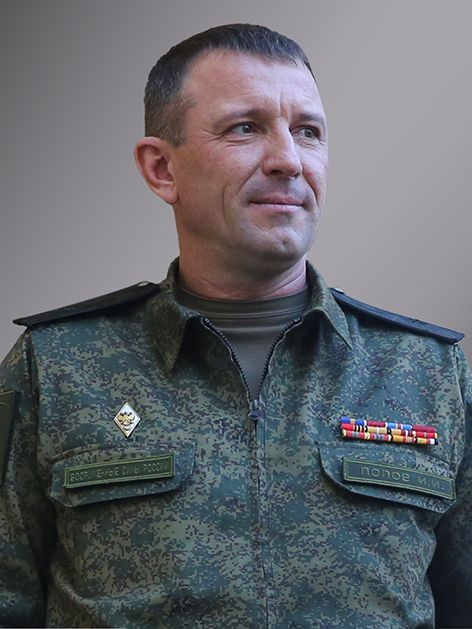
- Popov after his 2022 promotion to major general
- Born: 30 January 1975 (age 51); Danilovsky District, Volgograd Oblast, Soviet Union
- Military career
- Allegiance: Russia
- Branch: Russian Ground Forces
- Service years: 1992–2023
- Rank: Major general
- Nickname: Spartak (Spartacus)
- Commands: 20th Guards Motor Rifle Brigade; 58th Combined Arms Army
- Conflicts: Second Chechen War; Russo-Georgian War; Russo-Ukrainian War; Russian invasion of Ukraine

Major General Ivan Ivanovich Popov (Russian: Иван Иванович Попов; born 30 January 1975) is a Russian former military officer who commanded the 58th Combined Arms Army from 2022 to 2023.

== Early life and education ==
Popov was born on 30 January 1975 in a small farming khutor in the Don steppes, part of Danilovsky District, Volgograd Oblast. In his youth Popov aspired to follow in his father's footsteps as a border guard, seeking to enter the Alma-Ata Higher Border Command School, but after the collapse of the Soviet Union Popov applied to and was accepted to the Moscow Higher Military Command School in 1992.

== Military career ==
His first assignment after graduation as a platoon commander was to the 56th Air Assault Regiment of the North Caucasus Military District. With the 56th, Popov took part in the Second Chechen War. Popov graduated from the Combined Arms Academy and was posted to the operational directorate of the North Caucasus Military District headquarters, taking part in the Russo-Georgian War. Popov subsequently served at the National Defense Management Center. Graduating from the Military Academy of the General Staff in 2015, he was appointed commander of the 33rd Separate Motor Rifle Brigade (Mountain) in Adygea in December of that year.

By 2017 he commanded the 20th Separate Guards Motor Rifle Brigade of the Southern Military District at Volgograd. With a reputation as one of the fastest rising brigade commanders in the Russian Ground Forces, Popov's performance in exercises was noticed by his superiors. In September 2017 Popov left the brigade for promotion, and it was rumored that he would become deputy commander of the 49th Combined Arms Army.

By May 2018, he was chief of staff of the 22nd Army Corps in Crimea, and still held this position in May 2019.

=== Russian invasion of Ukraine ===
By May 2022, Popov was chief of staff of the 11th Army Corps in Kaliningrad Oblast. He commanded the Russian forces in the Balakliia area by June, conducting a chaotic retreat during the Ukrainian Kharkiv counteroffensive in September. Despite the Russian defeat, Popov was promoted to major general and commander of the 58th Combined Arms Army, responsible for the Zaporizhzhia sector, by March 2023. He announced the defeat of Ukrainian attacks in the Zaporizhzhia sector during the Ukrainian counteroffensive on 8 June. However, on 11 July milblogger Telegram channel VChK-OGPU reported that Popov had been relieved of command for requesting the rotation of units out of the frontline. On the next day, State Duma deputy Andrey Gurulyov published a message from Popov explaining the reasons for his dismissal.

Popov declared that Chief of the General Staff Valery Gerasimov dismissed him over his concerns for troops fighting without rest and criticism of Russian battlefield strategy. In response to Popov's criticisms, Gerasimov accused him of "engaging disinformation in panic." Popov indirectly accused Gerasimov and Defense Minister Sergei Shoigu of betraying Russian soldiers on the battlefield by failing to provide sufficient support and raised questions about "the lack of counter-battery fire, the absence of artillery radars and the mass deaths and injuries of our brothers from enemy artillery." Popov finished his message by exhorting his soldiers to continue the fight to defeat the Ukrainian counteroffensive "in the name of the blood spilled by soldiers and officers." State Duma Defense Committee Chairman Andrey Kartapolov responded to Popov's message with the statement that Popov's criticisms would be taken seriously and acted upon.

=== Arrest ===
Popov was arrested on 17 May 2024 on fraud charges. The 235th Garrison Military Court was reported to be taking up the case against Popov, who holds the rank of Major General. There was no comment from the Russian Defense Ministry or Russian law enforcement agencies about the reported arrest. On 15 July 2024, the military court allowed Popov to serve his pre-trial detention at home. In April 2025 he was sentenced to five years in prison. While in prison on 24 July 2025, Popov was awarded the Order "For Merit to the Zaporizhzhia Region" by Russian occupied Zaporizhzhia governor Yevgeny Balitsky.

== Awards ==
- Order "For Merit to the Zaporozhye Region" (2025)
