= Troitskaya, Republic of Ingushetia =

Troitskaya Троицкая
- Stanitsa

Other transcription(s)
  - Ingush: Эбарг-Юрт
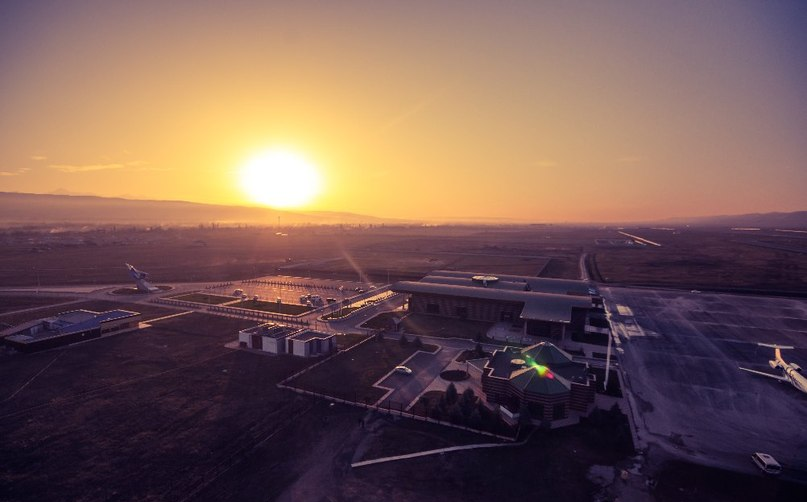
- Interactive map of Troitskaya
- Location of Troitskaya Troitskaya (Republic of Ingushetia)
- Coordinates: 43°18′17″N 45°00′01″E
- Country: Russia
- Federal subject: Ingushetia
- Founded: 1845
- Elevation: 340 m (1,120 ft)

Population (2010 Census)
  - Total: 18 092
  - Estimate (2025): 23,616

Administrative status
  - Subordinated to: Sunzhensky District
- Time zone: UTC+3 (MSK)
- Postal code: 386245
- OKTMO ID: 26610415101

Troitskaya (Ingush: Эбарг-Юрт, Ebarg-Jurt; Russian: Троицкая) is a stanitsa in Sunzhensky District of Ingushetia, Russia. It was founded on the site of the historic Ingush village of Ebarg-Yurt. It is located on the Sunzha River. Population: 18 092 (2010 census); .

== History ==
The village of Troitskaya was founded in 1845 near the former military fortification of Volynsky, in what is now the Sunzha region of the Chechen-Ingush Republic. The settlement was originally inhabited by settlers from the Don Cossacks, the Caucasus region, and the Voronezh Governorate. Over time, former soldiers and Cossacks were also placed in the village.

=== 1845–1874: Founding and early years ===
On July 22, 1846, Troitskaya was attacked by an armed formation of Orstkhoys, but the Sunzha Cossacks were able to repulse the attack and drive the attackers away. The village was a member of the 1st Sunzhensky Regiment of the Caucasian Line Cossack Host from 1858. As of 1874, the village had 306 households with 2264 residents, and there was an Orthodox church and school. The Trinity Church was consecrated on November 12, 1873, and a one-year school may have existed in the village since 1848.

=== 1882–1917: Fire and flood ===
In 1882, Troitskaya suffered a major fire that destroyed up to half of the village. In 1900, a serious flood occurred. In August 1917, there were clashes between the Ingush and the Cossacks of the villages of Karabulakskaya, Troitskaya, and Sleptsovskaya. The conflict was the result of clashes between the Ingush and soldiers returning from World War I.

=== 1991: Ethnic conflict ===
On April 27–29, 1991, a conflict took place in Troitskaya between the Ingush and the Cossacks on ethnic grounds. The clashes were provoked by a fight at a Cossack wedding and resulted in several houses and cars being burned down. According to preliminary data, 5 people were killed and 19 were injured, although the final data shows 8 people were killed. The Cossack activists of the village formed the Committee for the Rescue of the Sunzha Cossacks after the conflict.

In 2006 to 2008, a series of crimes were committed against Russian-speaking citizens in Troitskaya, Ordzhonikidzevskaya, Nesterovskaya, Karabulak, and other neighboring settlements in the Republic of Ingushetia. The incidents involved detonations of explosive devices, arson, spelling, and murder, and were a cause of significant public concern.

The events reached their climax with the attacks on the families of Russian teachers in Ordzhonikidzevskaya and Karabulak in the summer and autumn of 2007. These attacks, along with other crimes committed against Russians on the same days, led to a new wave of migration out of the republic, as many people sought to escape the insecurity and violence.

The causes of these crimes remain unclear, and there have been differing explanations put forth by different sources. Some suggest that they were the result of tensions between the local population and the Russian-speaking minority, while others believe that they were the work of extremist groups seeking to destabilize the region.

Regardless of the motives behind the crimes, their impact was significant, leading to a further erosion of trust between different communities and contributing to a sense of insecurity and instability in the Republic of Ingushetia.

== Geography ==
The village of Troitskaya is located in the Republic of Ingushetia, Russia. It is situated to the west of the city of Sunzha, almost merging with it, and is 2 km east of the city of Karabulak and 27 km northeast of the city of Magas, which can be reached along the road. The village is located on both banks of the Sunzha River, with the village of Yandare located to its southwest, and the village of Nesterovskaya to its southeast.

The federal highway P217 "Kavkaz" runs to the south of Troitskaya, and to the north is the railway line of the North Caucasian Railway, connecting Beslan to Sleptsovskaya. The airport "Magas" is located on the northern outskirts of the village.

The Assa-Sunzha canal runs to the south of Troitskaya, originating from Sunzha west of the village. The Wooded Range rises to the south, while to the north stretches the Sunzha Range, with Mount Razrytaya reaching a height of 652.4 meters.

== Demography ==
=== Ethnic composition ===
Census year	2010	2002	1979	1970	1939
Ingush people	▼15,254 (94.14%)	▲18,018 (83.72%)	▼73 (1.42%)	▲85 (0.27%)	15 (0.27%)
Russians	▼561 (3.46%)	▼1,089 (5.06% %)	▼4,677 (89.60%)	▼5,304 (88.70%)	5,423 (0.70%)
Chechens	▼268 (1.65%)	▲2,213 (10.28%)	▲243 (4.66%)	▼203 (3.39%)	39 (0.70%)
Other	122 (0.75%)	319 (1.83%)	266 (4.33%)	381 (6.17%)	121 (2.16%)
Total	16,225 (100%)	21,521 (100%)	5,220 (100%)	5,980 (100%)	5,598 (100%)
