= 2025 Moscow Victory Day Parade =

Russian military parade

Victory Day Parade on Red Square on 9 May 2025

The 2025 Moscow Victory Day Parade was a military parade held in Red Square, Moscow, Russia, on 9 May 2025, to commemorate the 80th anniversary of Victory Day, which celebrates the defeat of Nazi Germany and the end of World War II in Europe.

== Background ==
Victory Day is a significant secular holiday in Russia that commemorates Germany's surrender in World War II, which marked the end of the war in Europe. At least 26 million Soviet citizens lost their lives. Victory Day has been observed annually on 9 May since 1945, and it is one of the most revered and widely celebrated public holidays in Russia, with parades, fireworks, and concerts held across the country.

During the presidency of Vladimir Putin, Western observers and media have maintained that the holiday has been used for propaganda purposes, particularly since the Russian invasion of Ukraine.

== Parade summary ==
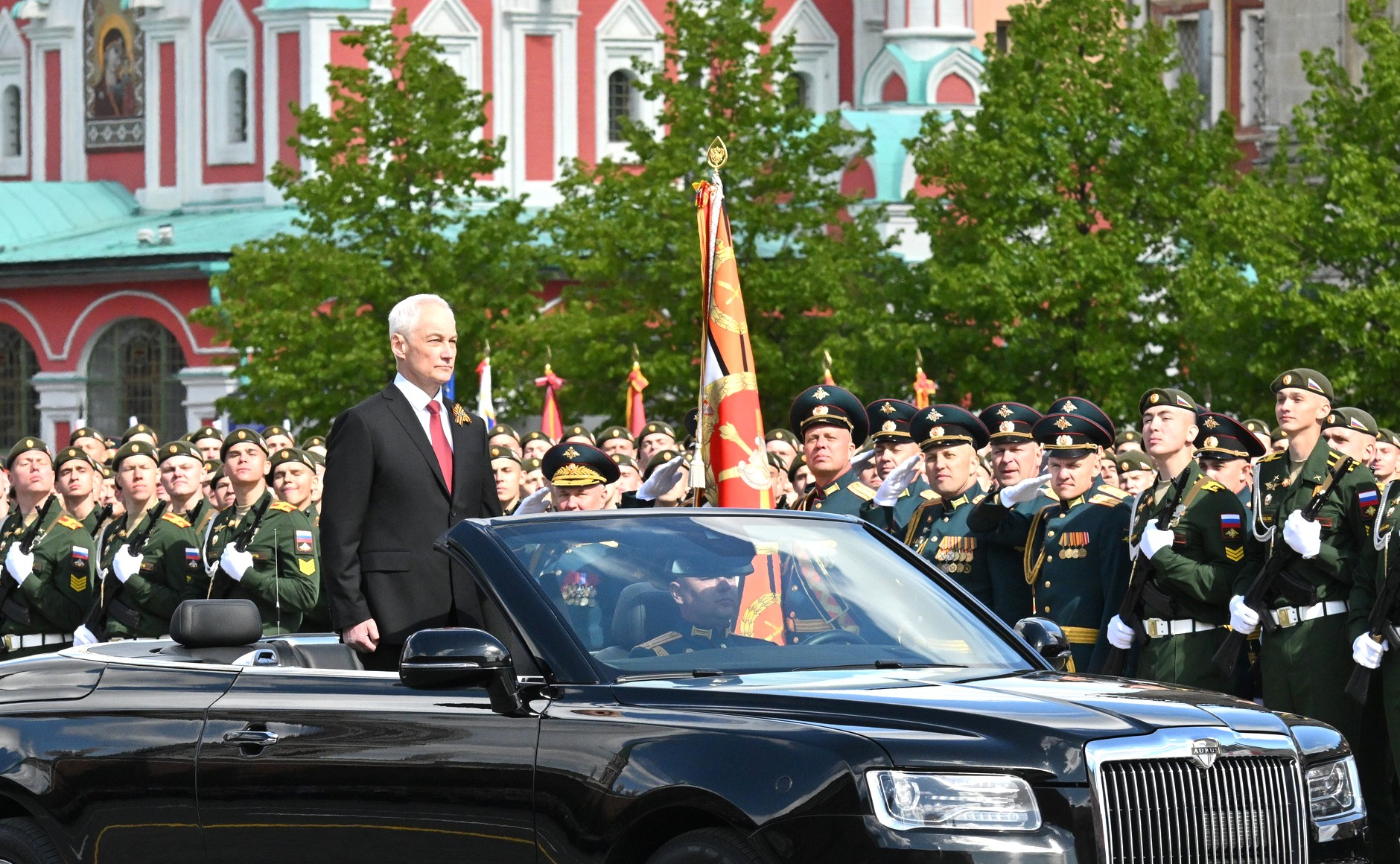
Russia's Defence Minister Andrey Belousov

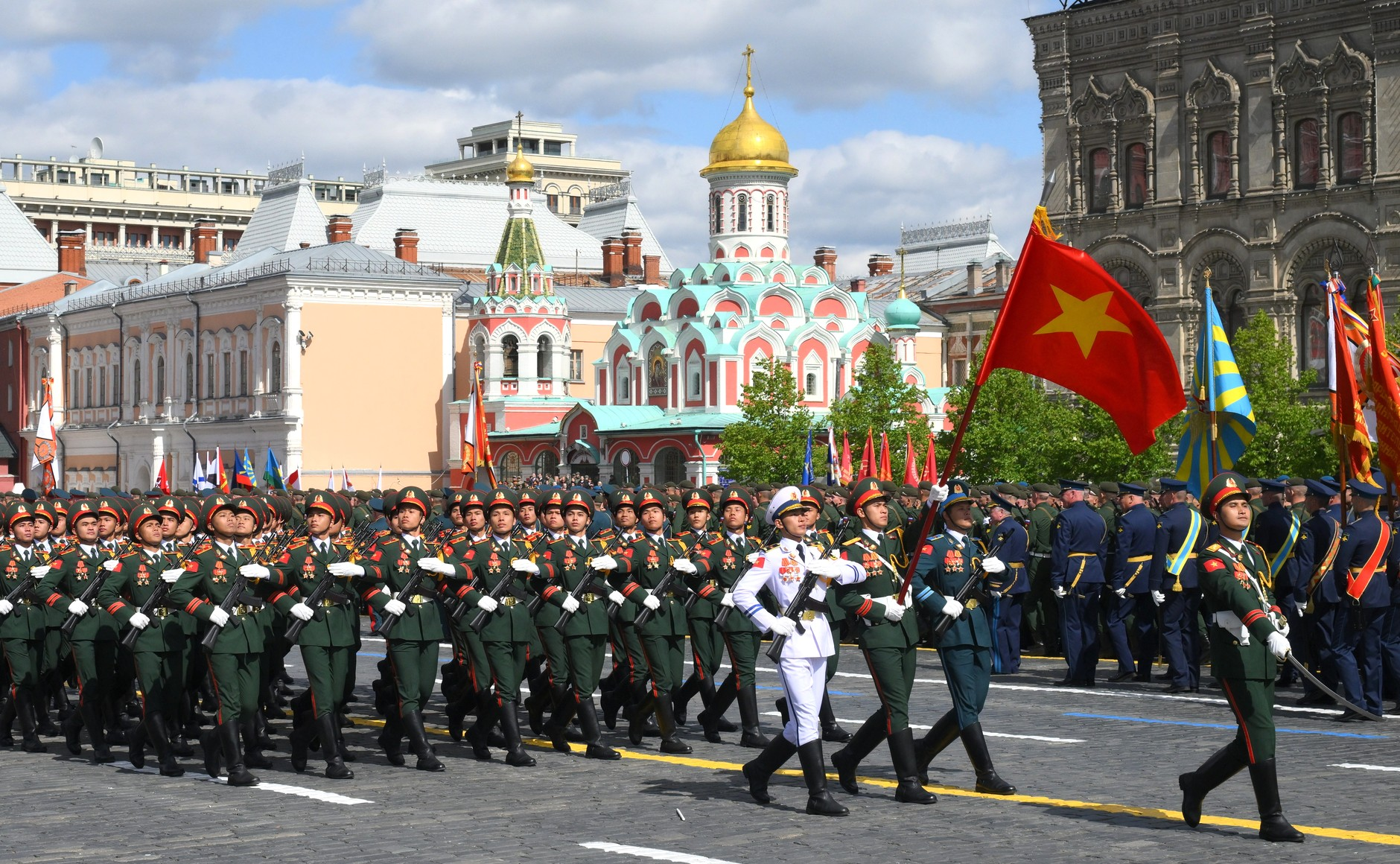
People's Army of Vietnam marching at the parade

For the first time since 2012, Sergei Shoigu did not greet the 11,500 troops on Red Square as Minister of Defence, as he was replaced on 12 May 2024 after the 2024 Victory Day Parade, with Andrey Belousov assuming the role, appearing in a civilian suit rather than military uniform. Thirteen foreign contingents participated in the parade, including troops from the Commonwealth of Independent States with Egypt, Laos, Myanmar, and Vietnam joining the procession for the first time. The mechanized column opened with the iconic WWII-era T-34 tank and SU-100 self-propelled gun, symbolizing Soviet victory. They were followed by a display of modern military hardware: BMP-2 and Kurganets-25 infantry fighting vehicles, T-72B3M, T-80BVM, and T-90M Proryv main battle tanks, reconnaissance vehicles, medical transports, and missile systems including the Iskander-M and S-400 air defense system. Notably, unmanned aerial vehicles and loitering munitions such as the ZALA Lancet and Geran-2 drones were featured for the first time, highlighting the growing role of drone warfare. The parade concluded with a flyover by Su-30SM and MiG-29 fighter jets from the Russian Knights and Swifts aerobatic teams, followed by six Su-25 jets emitting plumes in the colors of the Russian tricolour. In a significant diplomatic gesture, the Prime Minister of Slovakia, Robert Fico, became the first leader from an EU or NATO member state to attend the festivities since the onset of Russia's invasion of Ukraine.

== Putin's speech ==
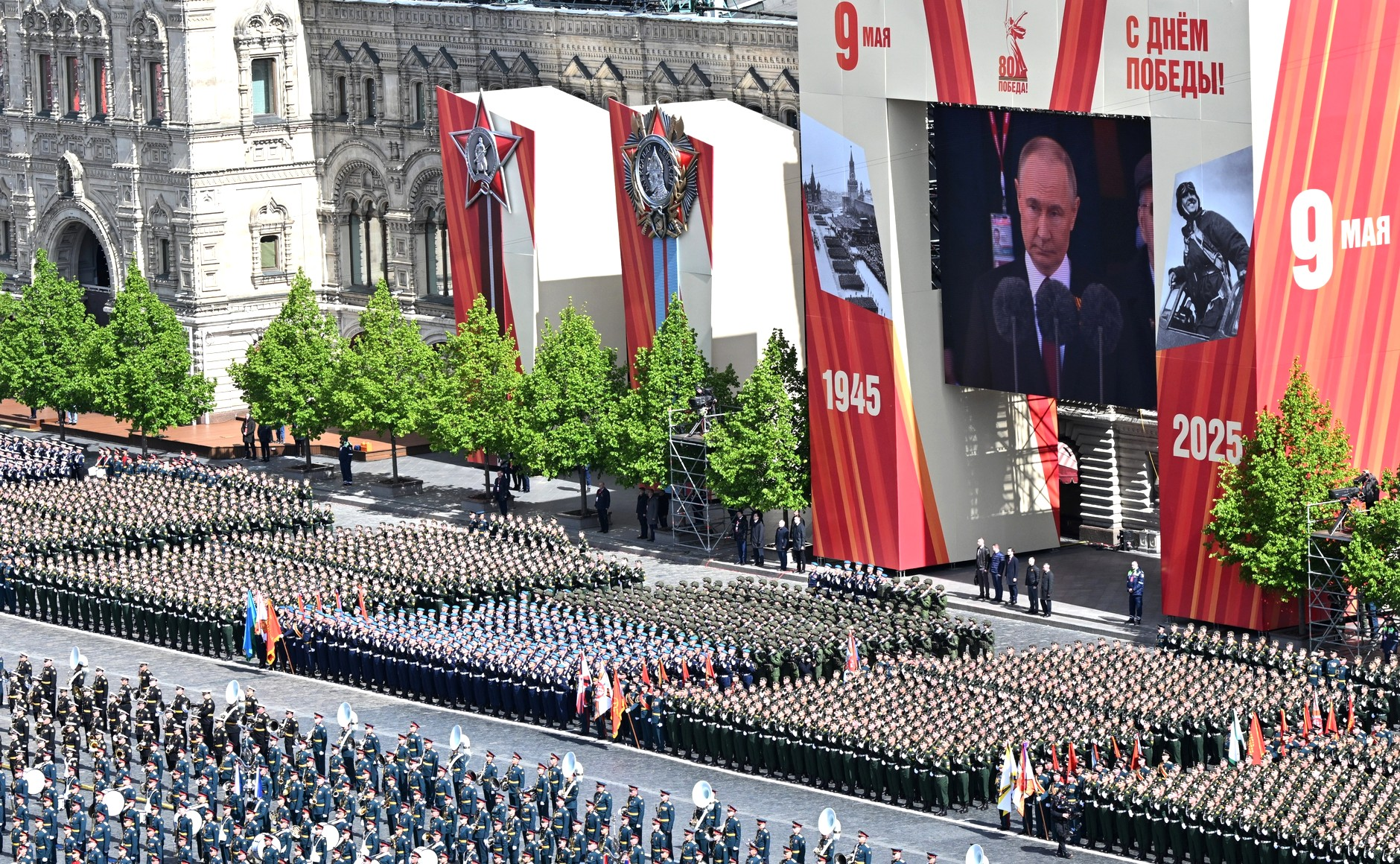
Putin's speech on 9 May 2025

In his Victory Day address, President Vladimir Putin emphasized Russia's role as the primary force behind the defeat of Germany, crediting the Soviet people with extraordinary heroism and sacrifice. He honored the memory of fallen soldiers and lauded the contributions of all Soviet republics, particularly highlighting the support from Central Asia and the South Caucasus during the war. He condemned modern attempts to distort the history of World War II, including efforts to downplay the Soviet Union's role or to rehabilitate Nazi collaborators. He criticized unnamed countries for erasing Soviet-era monuments and replacing them with memorials to what he called "traitors and Hitler's accomplices." He stated that Russia "will never agree" with the falsification of history or the slandering of the Red Army's legacy, and reaffirmed the need to preserve the truth and dignity of the Soviet war effort. Tying the legacy of the war to present-day events, Putin claimed that Russia's current military efforts are a continuation of the fight against Nazism and aggression. He asserted that the entire Russian society supports its soldiers and insisted that truth and justice are on Russia's side. He also warned of rising Russophobia and anti-Semitism, saying that Russia remains a global barrier against such ideologies. While acknowledging the contributions of the Allied nations, including the opening of the Second Front and the efforts of the Resistance and the Chinese people, Putin reiterated that the turning point of the war came on Soviet soil. He called on Russians to remain united, proud, and committed to their homeland, stating that the nation's strength lies in its unity, heritage, and values passed down by the wartime generation.

== Foreign dignitaries in attendance ==
Russia Attendance by head of state or government Attendance by ministerial official Attendance by high-level representative No official representatives

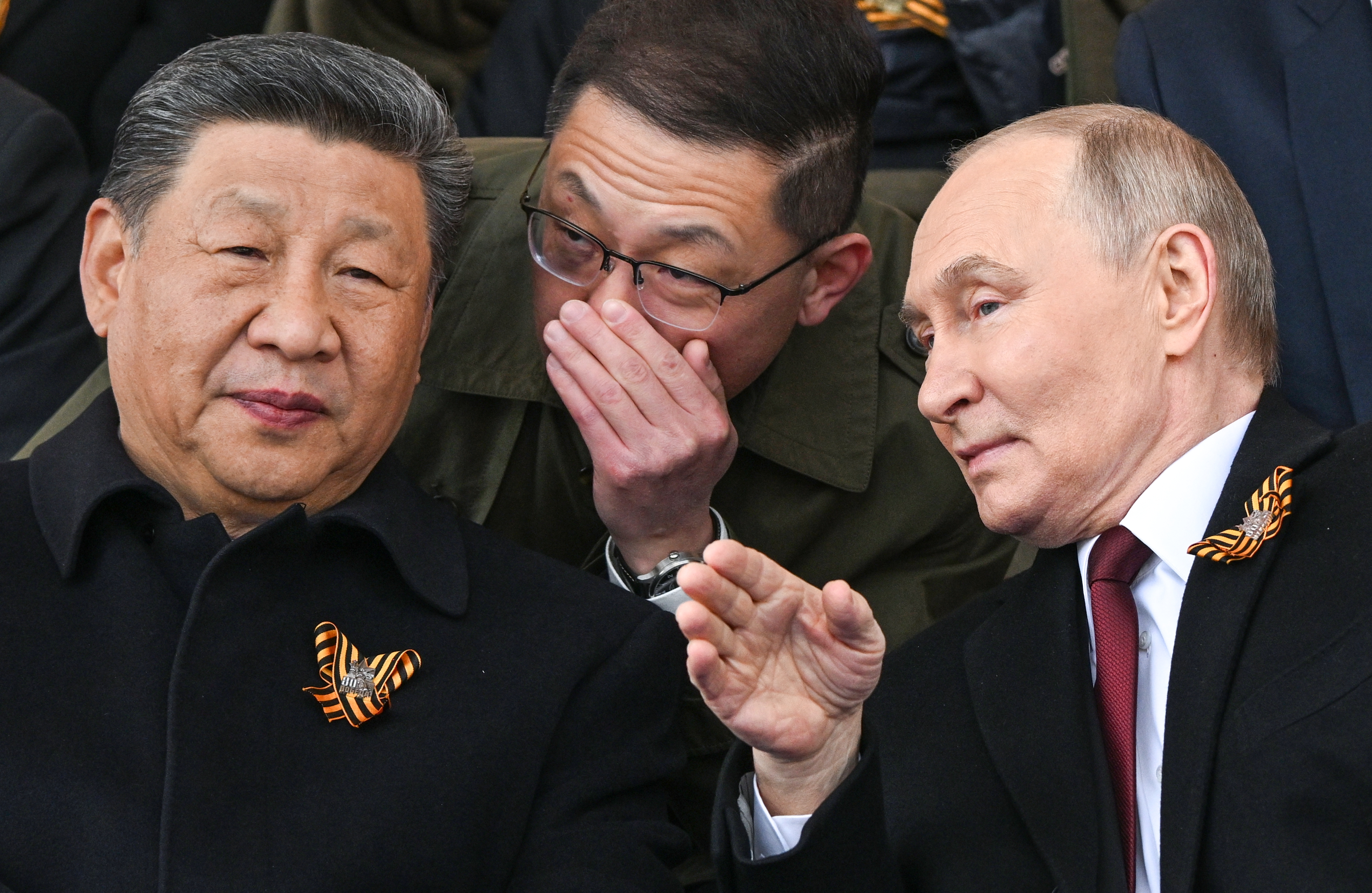
Russian President Vladimir V. Putin with China's Xi Jinping

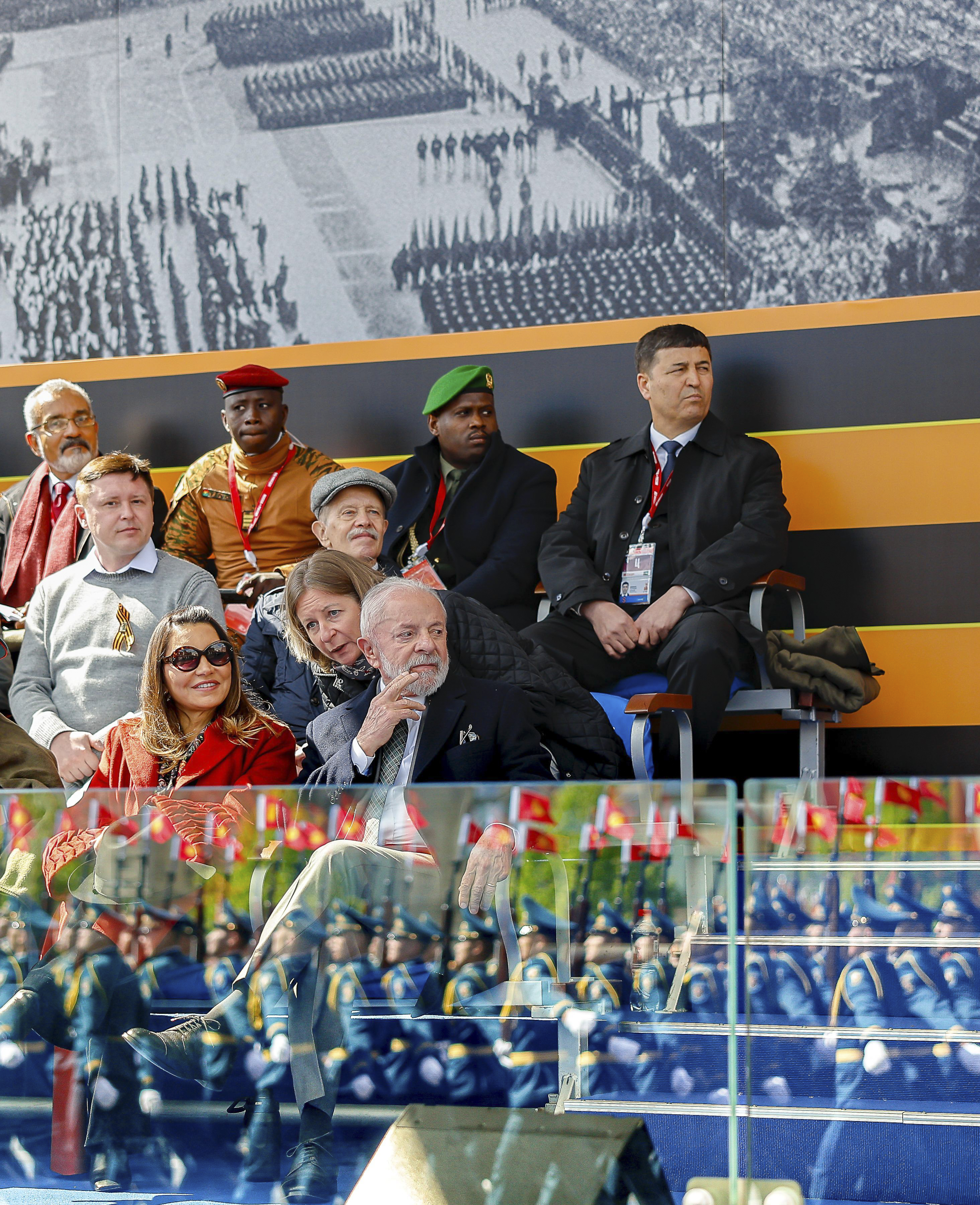
Brazil's Lula and First Lady Janja

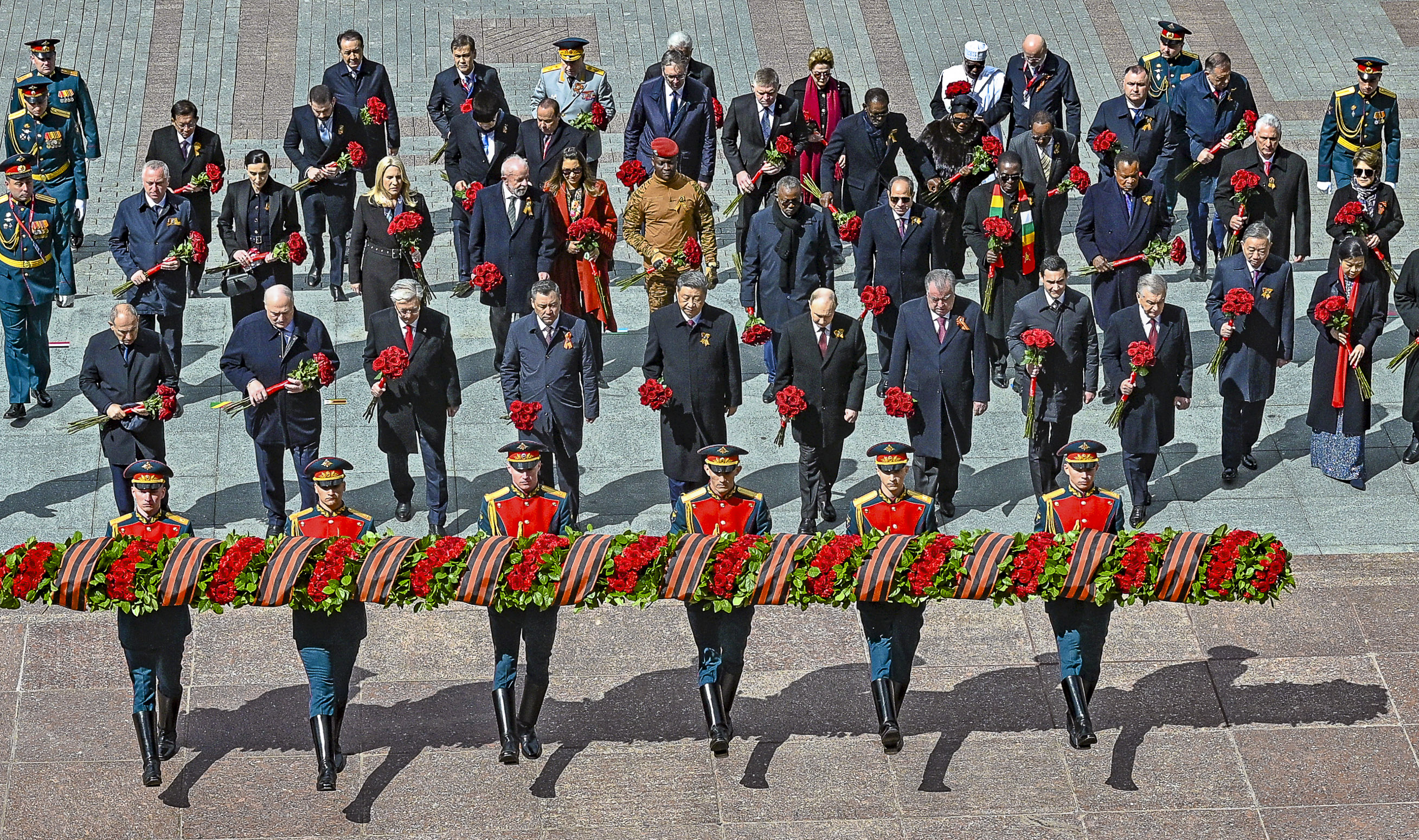
Foreign dignitaries

On 6 May, Yuri Ushakov, an aide to President Putin on foreign policy, announced a list of dignitaries who were to attend the parade, among whom were the leaders of 29 nations. Virtually all attended, including the leaders of most of the former Soviet republics, with the exceptions of the GUAM countries (Azerbaijan, Georgia, Moldova, and Ukraine) and the Baltic states. Azerbaijani President Ilham Aliyev cancelled his visit on 7 May, as did President of Laos Thongloun Sisoulith.

=== Parade participants ===
- President of Abkhazia Badra Gunba
- Prime Minister of Armenia Nikol Pashinyan
- Chairwoman of the Presidency of Bosnia and Herzegovina Željka Cvijanović
  - President of Republika Srpska Milorad Dodik
- President of Belarus Alexander Lukashenko
- President of Brazil Luiz Inácio Lula da Silva
- President of Burkina Faso Ibrahim Traoré
- President of China and General Secretary of the Communist Party Xi Jinping
- President of the Republic of the Congo Denis Sassou-Nguesso
- President of Cuba and First Secretary of the Communist Party Miguel Díaz-Canel
- President of Egypt Abdel Fattah el-Sisi
- President of Equatorial Guinea Teodoro Obiang Nguema Mbasogo
- President of Ethiopia Taye Atske Selassie
- President of Guinea-Bissau Umaro Sissoco Embaló
- Minister of State for Defence of India Sanjay Seth
- Minister of Defence of Indonesia Sjafrie Sjamsoeddin
- President of Kazakhstan Kassym-Jomart Tokayev
- President of Kyrgyzstan Sadyr Japarov
- Minister of Foreign Affairs of Laos Thongsavanh Phomvihane
- (Libya) Supreme Commander of the Libyan National Army Khalifa Haftar
- President of Mongolia Ukhnaagiin Khürelsükh
- Prime Minister of Myanmar and Chairman of the State Administration Council Min Aung Hlaing
- Advisor for Economic and International Affairs of Nicaragua Laureano Ortega
- Ambassador of North Korea to Russia Sin Hong-chol
- President of Palestine Mahmoud Abbas
- President of Serbia Aleksandar Vučić
- Minister of Defence and Military Veterans of South Africa Angie Motshekga
- President of South Ossetia Alan Gagloev
- President of Tajikistan Emomali Rahmon
- President of Turkmenistan Serdar Berdimuhamedow
- President of Uzbekistan Shavkat Mirziyoyev
- President of Venezuela Nicolás Maduro
- General Secretary of the Communist Party of Vietnam Tô Lâm
- President of Zimbabwe Emmerson Mnangagwa

=== Other participants ===
- Prime Minister of Slovakia Robert Fico (Note: Did not attend watching the military parade itself, only the official diplomatic reception and the commemoration act. Fico was the only leader of an EU member state that attended.)

On the evening of 8 May, Putin hosted an official dinner for foreign leaders present for the Victory Day parade.

== Full order of the 2025 parade ==
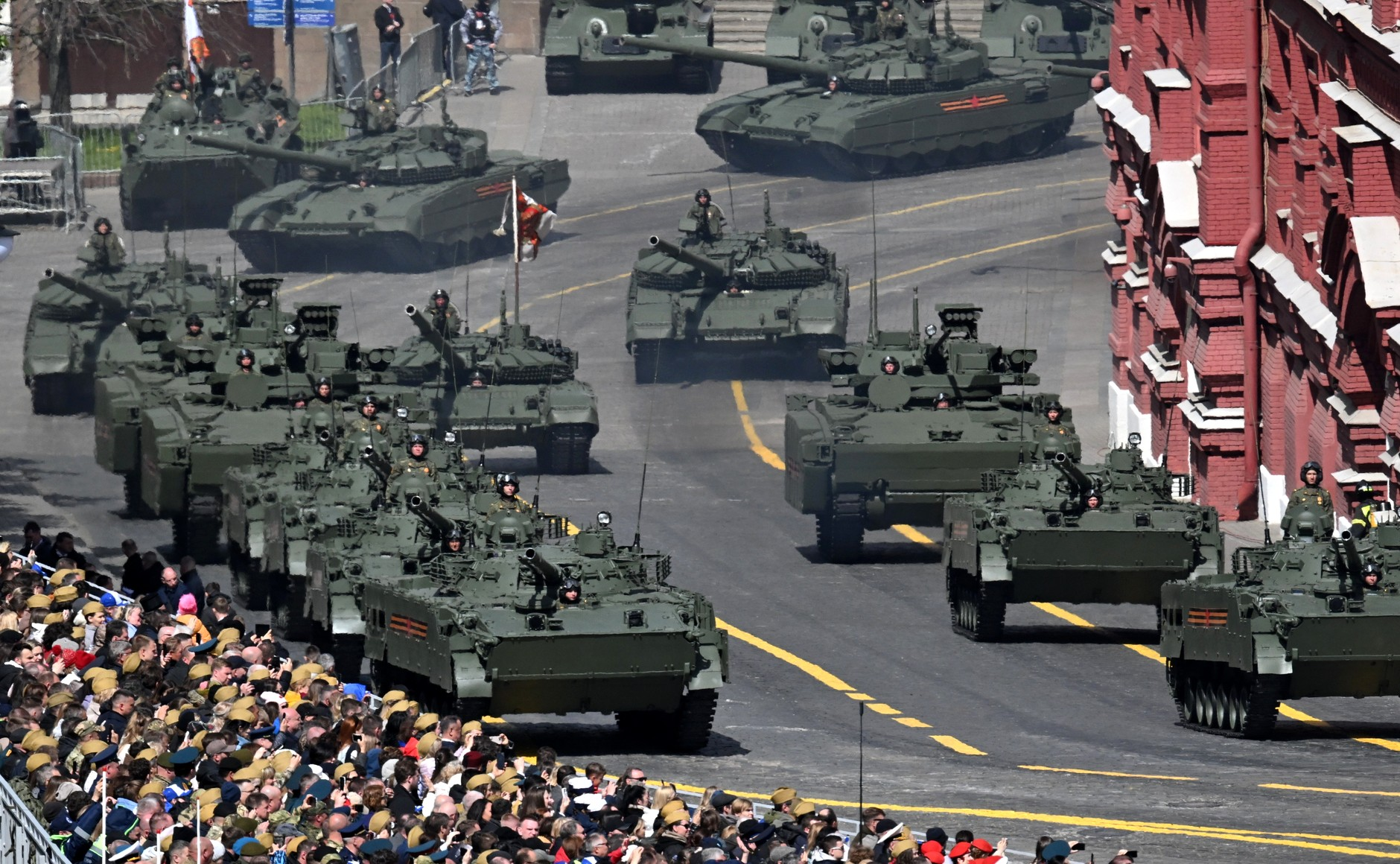
Russian tanks at a military parade on Red Square

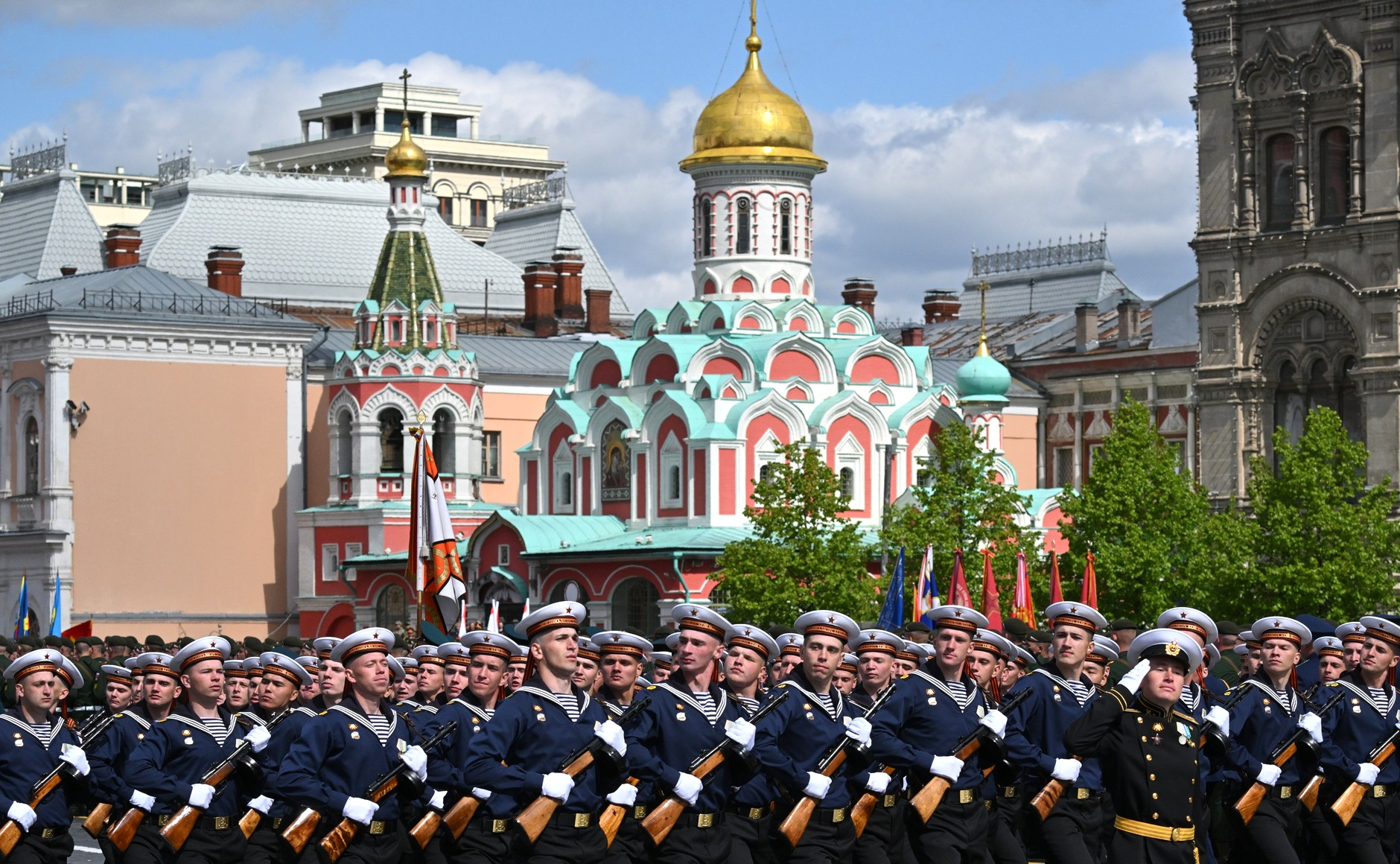
Russian sailors at a military parade on Red Square

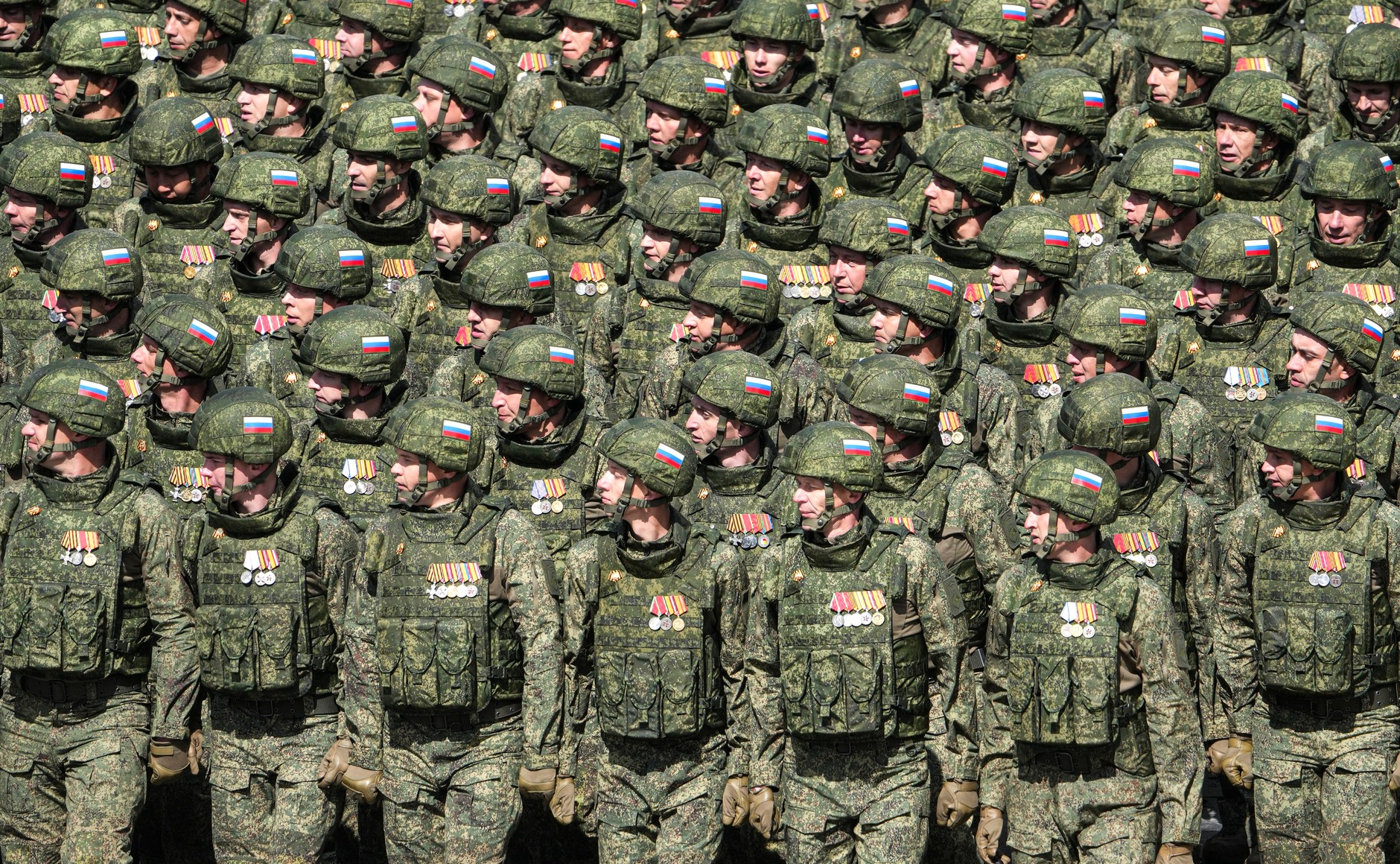
Combatants from the war in Ukraine at the military parade on Red Square

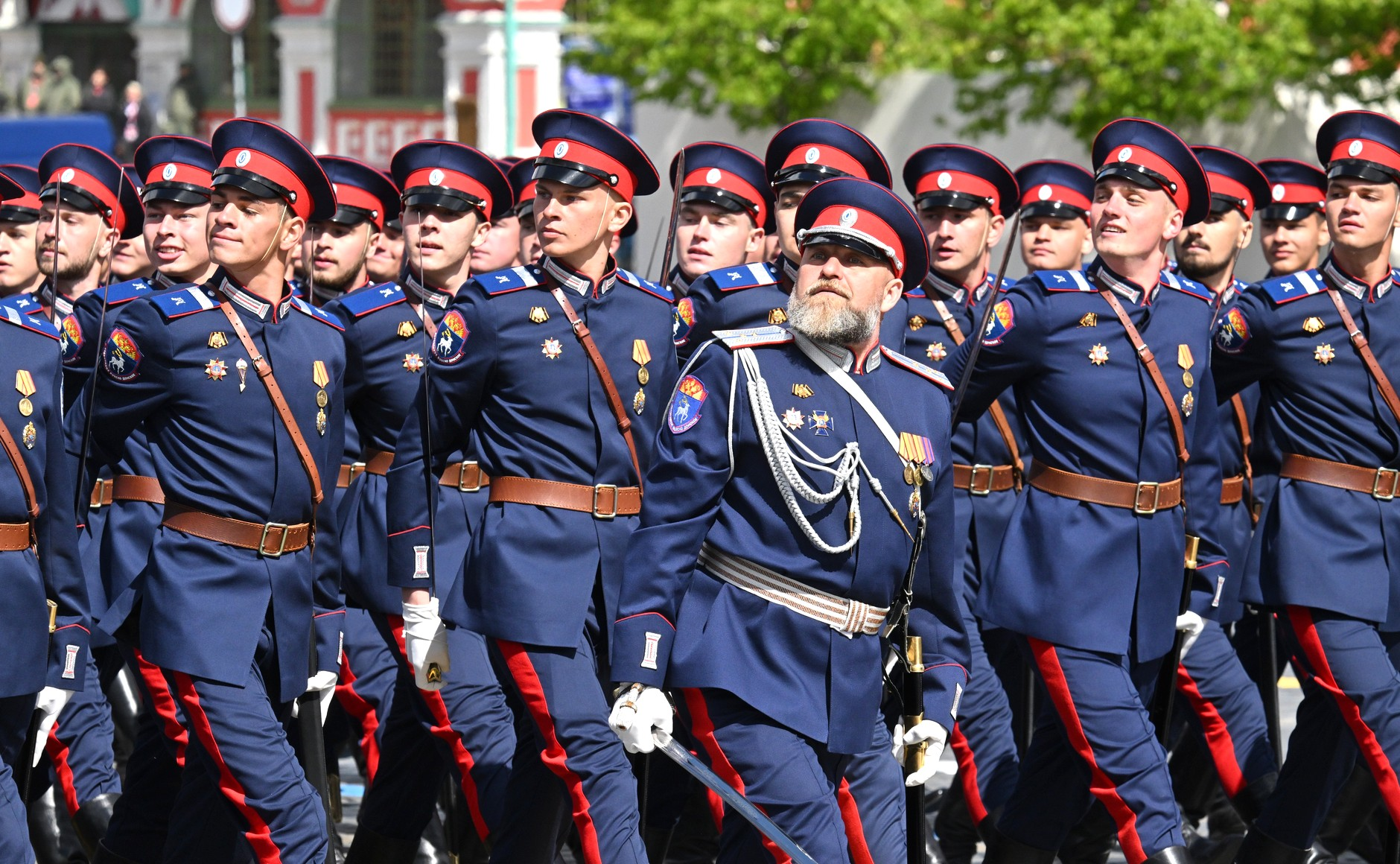
Cossacks at the military parade on Red Square

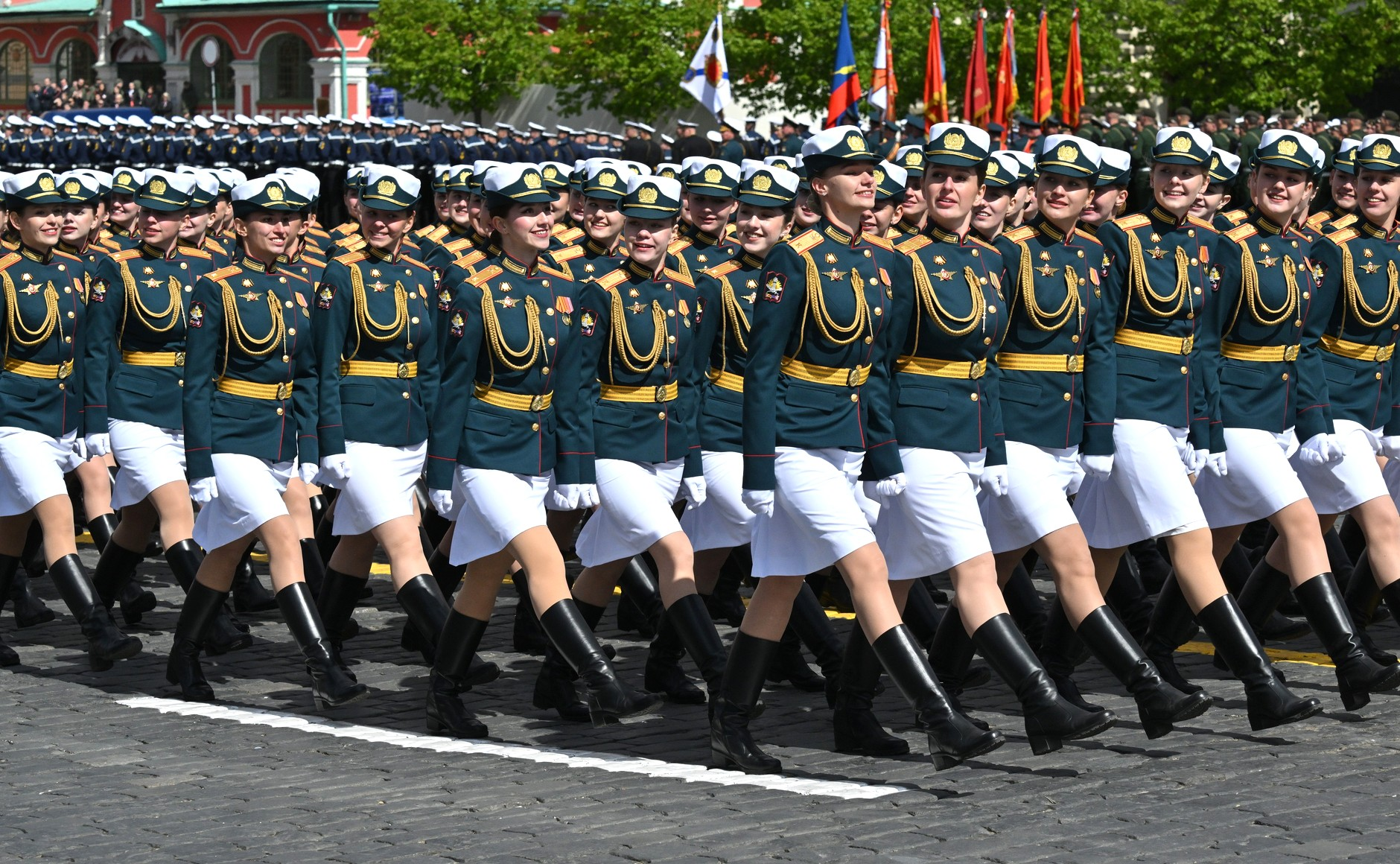
Military parade on Red Square

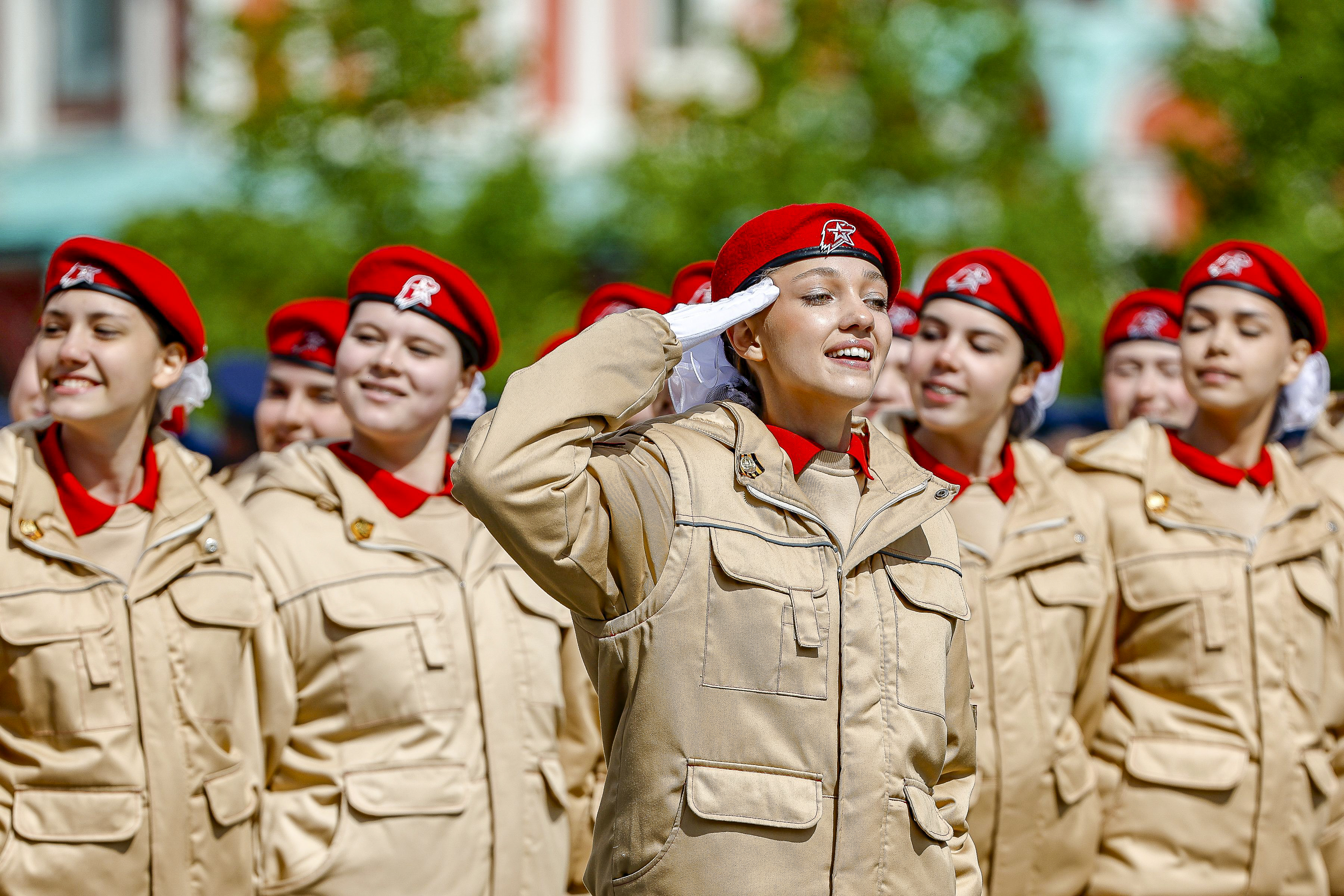
Young Army at a parade on Red Square

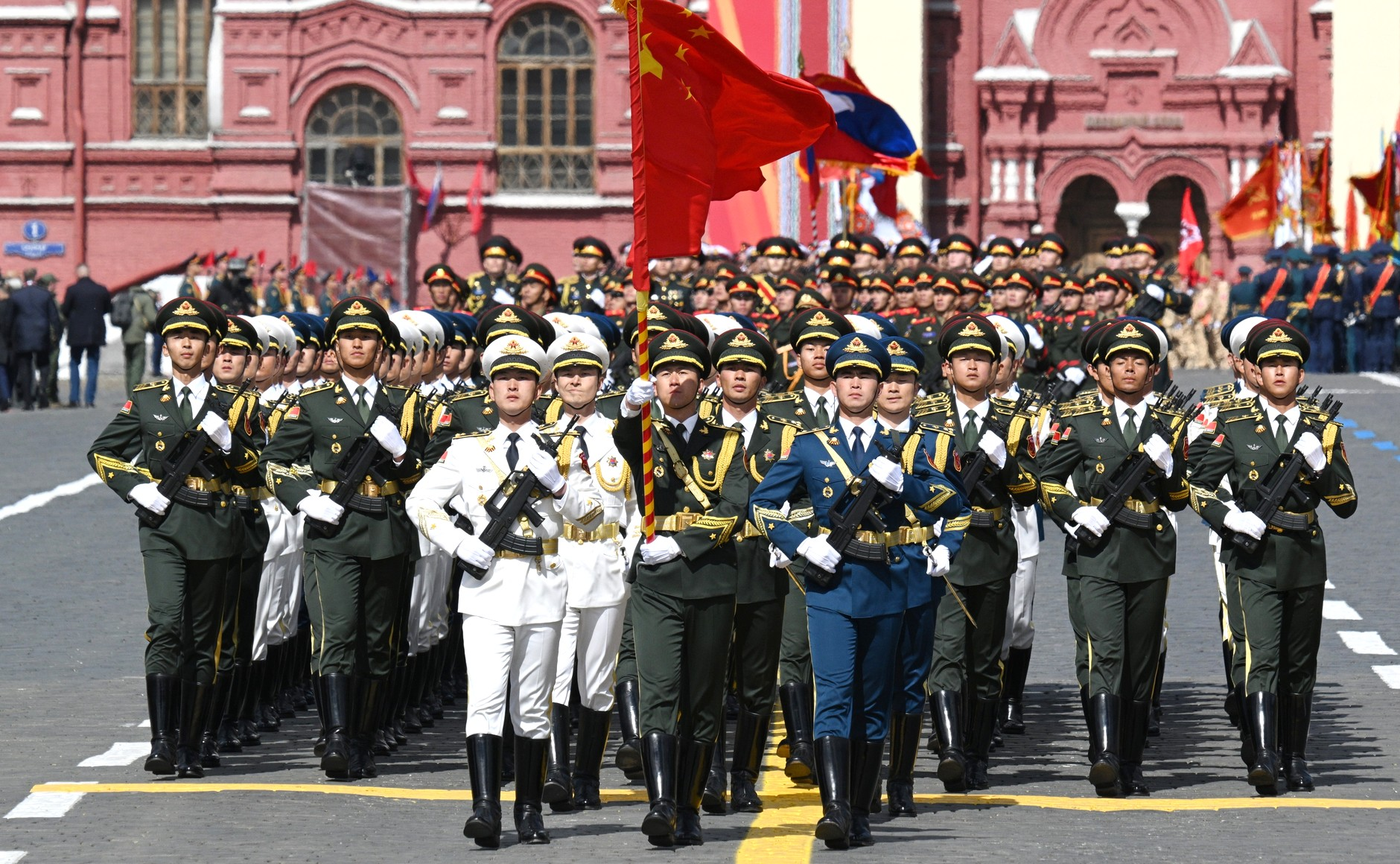
People's Liberation Army marching at the parade

Bold indicates first appearance, italic indicates multiple appearances, Bold and italic indicate returning appearance, all indicated unless otherwise noted.

- **Andrey Belousov, Minister of Defense of the Russian Federation** (parade reviewing inspector)
- General of the Army Oleg Salyukov, Commander-in-Chief of the Russian Ground Forces (parade commander)

=== Military bands ===
- Massed Military Bands of the Armed Forces under the direction of the Senior Director of Music of the Military Band Service of the Armed Forces of Russia, Major General Timofey Mayakin
- Corps of Drums of the Moscow Military Music College – Led by the College Commandant, Colonel Alexander Gerasimov

=== Infantry column ===
- 154th Preobrazhensky Independent Commandant's Regiment Colour Guard
- 1st Honour Guard Company of the 1st Honor Guard Battalion, 154th PICR
- Front standards and historical colours
- Historical units
  - Infantrymen
  - Aviators
  - Sailors
  - Combat engineers
  - Reconnaissance
  - Border Troops of the NKVD
  - Militiamen
  - Combined Don Cossacks Company
- Foreign contingents on parade, in the order of their appearance
  - (Azerbaijan) Azerbaijani Commando Brigade
  - 5th Brigade, Special Operations Forces of Belarus
  - (Kazakhstan) 37th Air Assault Brigade, Kazakh Airmobile Forces
  - National Guard of Kyrgyzstan
  - (Tajikistan) 7th Airborne Assault Brigade, Tajik Mobile Forces
  - Independent Honor Guard Battalion of the Ministry of Defence of Turkmenistan
  - Personnel of the Tashkent Military District of the Ministry of Defence of Uzbekistan
  - **Army Officer Training School No. 1, People's Army of Vietnam**
  - **(Egypt) Military Police Detachment, Egyptian Armed Forces**
  - (China) Beijing Capital Garrison Honor Guard Battalion, Central Theater Command, People's Liberation Army
  - (Laos) **Personnel of the Lao People's Armed Forces**
  - (Mongolia) 032 Military Unit, Mongolian Armed Forces
  - (Myanmar) **Honour Guard of the Tatmadaw**
- Suvorov Military School
- Nakhimov Naval School
- Kronstadt Sea Cadet Corps
- Moscow Young Army Patriotic Cadets Unit (on behalf of the Young Army Cadets National Movement)
- Unit of Participants of the Special Military Operation
- Combined Regiment of the Russian Ground Forces
  - Combined Arms Academy of the Armed Forces of the Russian Federation
  - Military University of the Ministry of Defense of the Russian Federation
  - Military Logistics Academy "General of the Army A. V. Khrulev"
  - Grand Duke Mikhailovskaya Military Artillery Academy
- Combined regiment of female cadets of Armed Forces educational institution
- Combined Regiment of the Russian Aerospace Forces
  - Zhukovsky - Gagarin Air Force Academy
  - Military Space Academy "Alexander Mozhaysky"
- Combined Regiment of the Russian Navy
  - Baltic Naval Institute "Admiral Feodor Ushakov"
  - Naval Polytechnic Institute
  - **Peter the Great Sea Cadet Corps**
  - Pacific Naval Institute "Admiral Sergei Makarov"
- Peter the Great Military Academy of the Strategic Missile Forces
- Ryazan Guards Higher Airborne Command School "General of the Army Vasily Margelov"
- Moscow Border Institute of the Border Service of the FSB of the Russian Federation "Moscow City Council"
- Engineering Troops Unit formed by Cadets of the **Tyumen Higher Command School** and servicemen of the 1st, the **28th** and 45th Engineering Brigades
- 38th Independent Railway Brigade of the Russian Railway Troops
- NBC Protection Military Academy "Marshal Semyon Timoshenko"
- Parade Unit of the Military Police
- Civil Defense Academy of the Ministry of Emergency Situations
- Separate Operational Purpose Division of the National Guard Forces Command, Federal National Guard Troops Service of the Russian Federation "Felix Dzerzhinsky"
- Cossacks from the Kuban and Terek Cossack Hosts
- Moscow Higher Military Command School "Supreme Soviet of Russia"

Countries whose troops participated in the 2025 Moscow Victory Day Parade

=== Mobile column ===
- T-34/85 medium tanks
- SU-100 tank destroyers
- Tigr-M infantry mobility vehicle (16th Guards Spetsnaz Brigade)
- **ZA-SpN "Titan"** infantry mobility vehicles
- Typhoon-K53949 "Phoenix" infantry mobility vehicles
- Linza medical evacuation vehicles
- **BRM-1K** reconnaissance vehicles (136th Guards Reconnaissance Battalion of 2nd Guards Motor Rifle Division)
- BMP-2 infantry fighting vehicles (15th Guards Motor Rifle Regiment)
- BMP-3M & Kurganets-25 infantry fighting vehicles (27th Separate Guards Motor Rifle Brigade)
- T-72B3M main battle tanks (1st Guards Tank Regiment)
- T-80BVM main battle tanks (13th Guards Tank Regiment)
- T-90M "Proryv" main battle tanks (1st Guards Motor Rifle Regiment)
- 2S19 Msta-S self-propelled howitzers (34th Guards Artillery Division)
- **2S44 Giatsint-K** & **2S43 Malva** self-propelled howitzers
- Tornado-S multiple rocket launchers
- TOS-2 "Tosochka" heavy flamethrower systems
- 9K720 Iskander-M short-range ballistic missile systems (448th Rocket Brigade & 112th Guards Rocket Brigade)
- Trucks with **Orlan**, Lancet & **Geran-2** launchers (7th Separate Regiment of the Unmanned Systems Troops)
- S-400 "Triumf" surface-to-air missile systems (584th Anti-Aircraft Missile Regiment of 4th Air Defence Division of 1st Special Purpose Air and Missile Defense Army)
- BMD-4 & BTR-MDM "Rakushka" infantry fighting vehicles (106th Guards Airborne Division)
- RS-24 Yars intercontinental ballistic missile systems (54th Guards Rocket Division)
- VPK-7829 Bumerang infantry fighting vehicles

=== Aerial column ===
- Sukhoi Su-30 & Mikoyan MiG-29 fighters planes (Russian Knights & Swifts aerobatic teams)
- Sukhoi Su-25 attack aircraft

== Music ==
Music was performed by the massed bands of the Moscow Garrison, commanded by Major general Timofey Mayakin.

Inspection of Troops

- Sacred War ("Священная война") by Aleksandr Aleksandrov
- Jubilee Slow March "25 Years of the Red Army" (Юбилейный встречный марш "25 лет РККА") by Semyon Tchernetsky
- March of the Life-Guard Preobrazhensky Regiment ("Марш Лейб-гвардии Преображенского полка")
- Slow March of Military Schools ("Встречный марш военных училищ") by Semyon Tchernetsky
- Slow March for Carrying Out the Combat Banner ("Встречный Марш для выноса Боевого Знамени") Dmitriy Kadeyev
- Guards Slow March of the Navy (Гвардейский Встречный Марш Военно-Морского Флота") by Nikolay Ivanov-Radkevich
- Slow March (Встречный марш) by Yevgeniy Aksyonov
- Slav'sya ("Славься") by Mikhail Glinka
- Moscow Parade Fanfare ("Московская Парадная Фанфара")

Speech by President of the Russian Federation, Vladimir Putin

- State Anthem of the Russian Federation ("Государственный гимн Российской Федерации") by Aleksandr V. Aleksandrov
- Signal Retreat ("Сигнал Отбой")

Infantry Column

- Drum and Fife based on the theme from the March "General Miloradovich" ("Тема из Марша Генерал Милорадович") by Valeriy Khalilov
- Metropolitan March ("Марш "Столичный") by Viktor Runov
- Triumph of the Winners (Триумф Победителей)
- March Cossacks in Berlin (Марш "Казаки в Берлине") by the Pokrass Brothers
- Salute to Moscow (Салют Москвы) by Semyon Tchernetsky
- Phalanx March ("Строевой Марш") by Dmitriy Pertsev
- Moscow in May ("Москва майская") by the Pokrass Brothers
- March of the Nakhimov Naval Cadets ("Марш нахимовцев") by Vasiliy Solovyov-Sedoy
- Sports March ("Спортивный Марш") by Valentin Volkov
- On Guard for Peace ("На страже Мира") by Boris Diyev
- In Defense of the Motherland ("Марш В защиту Родины") by Viktor Runov
- Katyusha ("Катюша") by Matvey Blanter
- Air March ("Авиaмарш") by Yuriy Khayt
- I Believe, My Friends ("Я верю, друзья") by Oskar Fel'tsman
- March The Sea is Calling (Марш "Море зовёт") by Aleksandra Pakhmutova
- March of the Artillerymen ("Марш артиллеристов") by Tikhon Khrennikov
- We Need One Victory ("Нам нужна одна Победа") by Bulat Okudzhava
- March Leningrad ("Марш Ленинград") by Viktor Runov
- March Parade (Марш "Парад") by Semyon Tchernetsky
- Song of the Perturbed Youth ("Песня о тревожной молодости") by Aleksandra Pakhmutova
- To Serve Russia ("Служить России") by Eduard Khanok
- March Cossacks in Berlin (Марш "Казаки в Берлине") by the Pokrass Brothers
- Let's Go ("В путь") by Vasiliy Solovyov-Sedoy
- Drum and Fife based on the theme from the March "General Miloradovich" ("Тема из Марша Генерал Милорадович") by Valeriy Khalilov

Mobile and Air Column

- Triumph of the Winners (Триумф Победителей)
- Invincible and Legendary (Несокрушимая и легендарная) by Aleksandr Aleksandrov
- March Small Land (Марш "Малая земля") by Aleksandra Pakhmutova
- March Three Tankmen (Марш "Три Танкиста") by the Pokrass Brothers
- March of the Soviet Tankists (Марш советских танкистов) by the Pokrass Brothers
- March Joy of the Victory (Марш "Радость Победы") by Vasiliy Bekker
- March Hero ("Марш Герой")
- Long Live Our State ("Да здравствует наша держава") by Boris Aleksandrov
- Air March ("Авиaмарш") by Yuriy Khayt

Conclusion of the Parade

- March Victory Day (Марш "День Победы") by David Tukhmanov

Ceremony at the Tomb of the Unknown Soldier

- Eternal Flame ("Вечный огонь) by Rafail Khozak
- Adagio ("Адажио") by Valeriy Khalilov
- State Anthem of the Russian Federation ("Государственный гимн Российской Федерации") by Aleksandr Aleksandrov
- Silence ("Тишина") by Lev Gurov
- The Sacred War ("Священная война") by Aleksandr Aleksandrov
- Flagship March ("Флагманский Марш") by Aleksandr Rozenbaum
- We Need One Victory ("Нам нужна одна Победа") by Bulat Okudzhava
- Ballad of a Soldier ("Баллада о Солдате") by Mikhail Matusovskiy

== Announced ceasefire ==
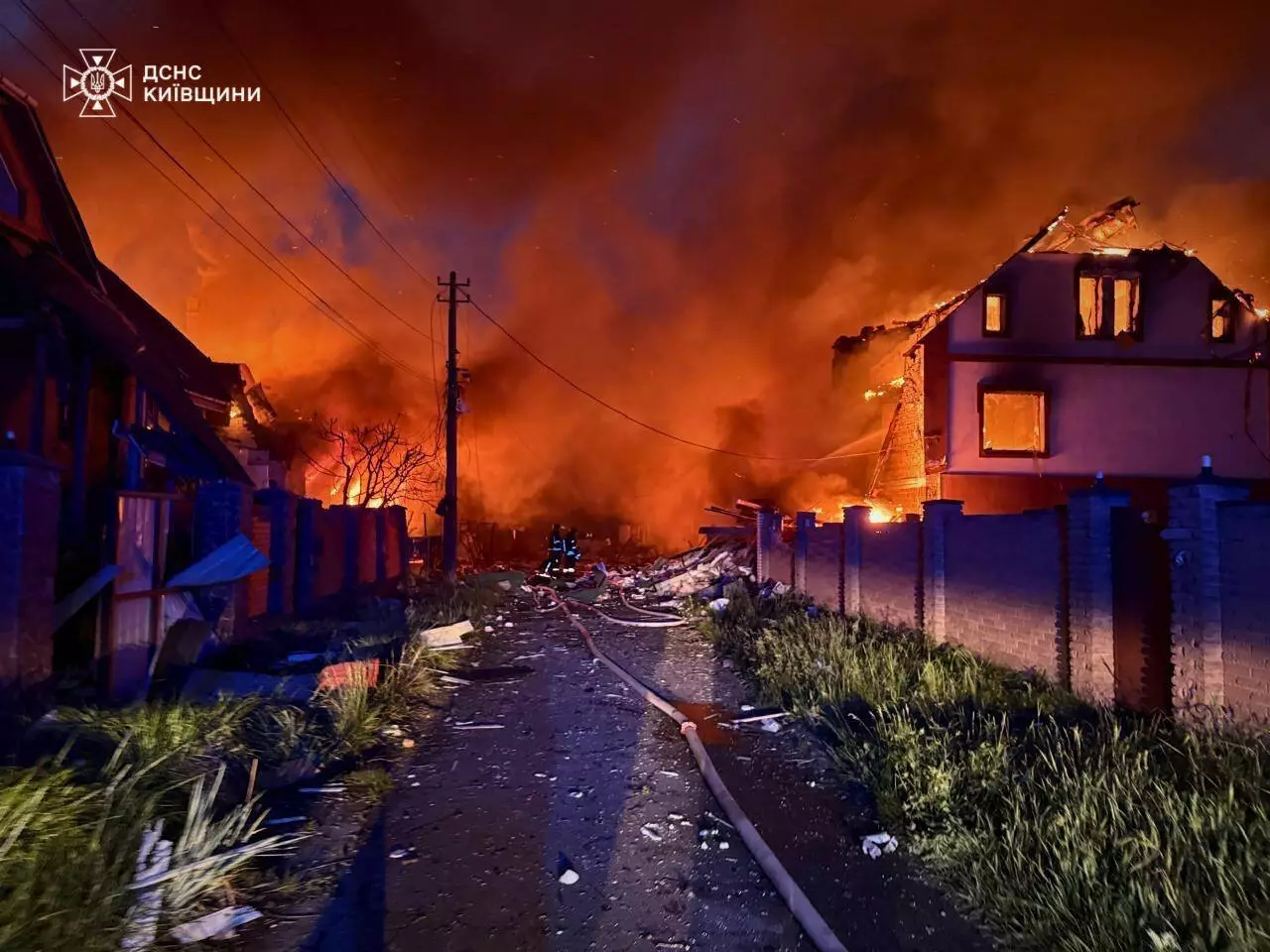
A Russian drone strike in the village of Markhalivka, Ukraine on 25 May 2025, after the end of Putin's ceasefire

Before the parade, Russian president Vladimir Putin announced a ceasefire during the Russo-Ukrainian war. Putin wanted the announced ceasefire to last only three days, from 8 to 11 May, and rejected a proposal of having a ceasefire for 30 days. Ukrainian President Volodymyr Zelenskyy rejected Putin's proposal and reiterated his support for an earlier proposal for a 30-day ceasefire.

During the ceasefire announced by Russia, the Russian forces continued the attacks on Ukraine. Ukrainian drone attacks forced Sheremetyevo International Airport in Moscow to repeatedly suspend operations, forcing Serbian President Vučić's flight to make a stopover in Azerbaijan. Putin's spokesperson Dmitry Peskov condemned "the Kyiv regime" and "its propensity for terrorist acts". President Zelenskyy warned that Ukraine "cannot be responsible for what happens" in Russia due to the war in Ukraine, and won't be "playing games to create a pleasant atmosphere to allow for Putin's exit from isolation on May 9."

== See also ==
- 1945 Moscow Victory Parade
- 2025 China Victory Day Parade
- Victory Day (9 May)
- Victory in Europe Day
- Victory Day Parades
