= List of people convicted of corruption in Russia =

This is a list of high-profile people convicted for corruption in Russia.

== 2000s and 2010s ==
According to Chief Military Prosecutor of Russia Sergei Fridinsky, in 2010 the corruption in Russian Armed Forces amounted over 6.5 trillion roubles.

In December 2018, Russia's Prosecutor General Yury Chaika reported 7,800 corruption convictions in 2018, including of 837 law enforcement officers, 63 elected officials at regional and municipal levels, and 606 federal, regional, and municipal officials.

- 2001: Valentin Kovalyov, former Minister of Justice, 9 years
- 2006: Vladimir Ganeyev, former Lieutenant-General of the Ministry of Emergency Situations, Case of Werewolves in Epaulettes; 20 years, released in 2014 due to health
- 2008: Nikolay Utkin, former mayor of Tolyatti, 7 years, released on probation ahead of time in 2012
- 2011: Anatoli Bashlakov, former chief of Plesetsk Cosmodrome, 7 years.
- 2011: Eduard Kachanovsky, former mayor of Smolensk, 4 years and fine
- 2012: Yuri Sleptsov, former mayor of Voskresensk, Moscow Oblast, 18.1 million rouble fine
- 2013: Vyacheslav Dudka, 9.5 years of penal colony, former governor of Tula Oblast
- 2017: On November 14, 2016, Alexey Ulyukaev, Minister for Economic Development, was arrested by Investigative Committee, allegedly for receiving a bribe of 2,000,000 US Dollars. In 2017 he was sentenced to a fine and 8 years of colony.
- 2 March 2018: Andrey Nelidov, former head of the Republic of Karelia: On September 24, 2015, Nelidov was detained on suspicion of accepting a bribe from an entrepreneur. On 2 March 2018 he was sentenced to eight years in jail and fined 25.7 million roubles for accepting a 4.6 million rouble bribe in 2015. Nelidov applied for parole after serving two-thirds of the sentence and was released in March 2021.
- 2018: On June 24, 2016, Nikita Belykh, governor of Perm Oblast, was arrested in a bar by Russian Investigative Committee, allegedly for receiving a bribe of 400,000 Euros. In 2018 he was sentenced for 8 years and fine 48.2 million rubles.
- 2018: In March 2015 Aleksandr Khoroshavin, Governor of Sakhalin Oblast, was arrested after being accused of taking bribes, equivalent of US$5.6 million In 2018 he was sentenced for 13 years and 500 million rubles fine.
- June 10, 2019: Vyacheslav Gayzer, former head of the Komi Republic: On 19 September 2015, he was arrested, but in 2017 the initial charges were dropped. However, on June 10, 2019, he was sentenced for 11 years of strict regimen penal colony.

== 2023 ==
- 2023: Mikhail Abyzov, a major businessman and a minister under Dmitry Medvedev: In 2019 he was charged of defrauding Siberian energy companies of $62m and moving the proceeds offshore. He was arrested in March 2019. In 2023, Abyzov was sentenced to 12 years in prison on charges of embezzlement and criminal conspiracy. He was incriminated that in violation of the Federal "On combating corruption" and other laws, he filed false information about income and property.

== 2024 ==
19 March 2024: The sentence was announced for the Marina Rakova Case, named after Maria Rakova, former minister of education of Russia. Rakova was sentenced for 5 years in a general regime penal colony, all other defendants, including Sergey Zuev, received suspended sentences.

== 2025 ==
- January 17, 2025: Major General Konstantin Ogiyenko, the Russian commander of the 1st Special Purpose Air and Missile Defence Army, which protects Moscow from airstrikes was accused of bribery in September 2023 and convicted for 8 years of penal colony, however he applied for service in the "Special military operation" in Ukraine.
- April 17, 2025: Vadim Shamarin, former deputy Chief of Staff was convicted by a court-martial over the bribery charges and was sentenced to seven years' imprisonment.
- July 1, 2025: Timur Ivanov, deputy Minister of Defense. On July 1 he was sentenced for 13 years of penal colony and 25 million ruble fine, stripped of all state awards, and banned from administrative positions for 4 years.
- On March 5, 2026, Ruslan Tsalikov, former First Deputy Minister of Defence, was detained by the employees Investigative Committee of Russia as part criminal case of an investigation into the creation of a criminal community, as well as the legalization of stolen property and bribery. On 19 November 2026 he was convicted to 10 years of colony, and stripped of state awards. His and his family's assets of 5.5 billion rubles we turned to state.

== 2026 ==
- March 3, 2026: Major General Konstantin Kuvshinov, former head of the 9th Medical and Diagnostic Centre of Russia's Defence Ministry was accused of embezzling over RUB 57 million (approx. US$410,000) and bribery while concluding state contracts for medical supplies. On 3 March 2026 he was convicted to 7.5 years of penal colony.
- April 6, 2026: Alexei Smirnov, ex-governor of Kursk Oblast: On 16 April 2025, he was arrested as part of an investigation into the alleged embezzlement of public funds to build defensive fortifications along the border with Ukraine. On April 6, 2026, he was sentenced for 14 years of penal colony and 400 million rubles fine, for embezzlement and bribery .
- April 10, 2026: Pavel Popov, ex- Deputy Minister of Defense. Accused of large-scale fraud, official forgery, abuse of power, forgery in official capacity, and illegal arms trafficking, he was sentenced to 19 years in a maximum-security penal colony, fined of 85 million rubles, and his funds in the amount of 45 million rubles were confiscated into state budget. He was also stripped of his rank of Army general in reserve.
- April 24, 2025: Ivan Popov (Иван Попов), Major General, former commander of the 58th Army of the Southern Military District: His arrestwas announced on May 21, 2024. In April 2025, the Tambov Garrison Military Court sentenced him for fraud and official forgery for 5 years of penal colony, with fine of 800,000 rubles, and stripped of the rank.

It was suggested that the arrest was a retaliation for whistleblowing; he alleged mistakes were made by top command during the early days of the Russian invasion of Ukraine. After over 55,000 inquiries from citizens concerned about Ivan Popov's sentence, which they consider to be contrary to both the factual circumstances of the case and the principle of fair treatment, Popov's lawyer filed a complaint and his case was submitted for review to the Novosibirsk Military Court of Cassation in February 2026.

- September 22: Aleksandr Busygin (Александр Бусыгин), former chief of clothing supplies department of the National Guard of Russia was sentenced to 8 years of imprisonment for bribery and stripped of the rank of colonel.

== See also ==
- "On Counteracting Corruption", a 2009 Russian law
- Corruption in Russia
- Purges in the Russian Ministry of Defense in 2024
