= Purges in the Russian Ministry of Defense in 2024 =

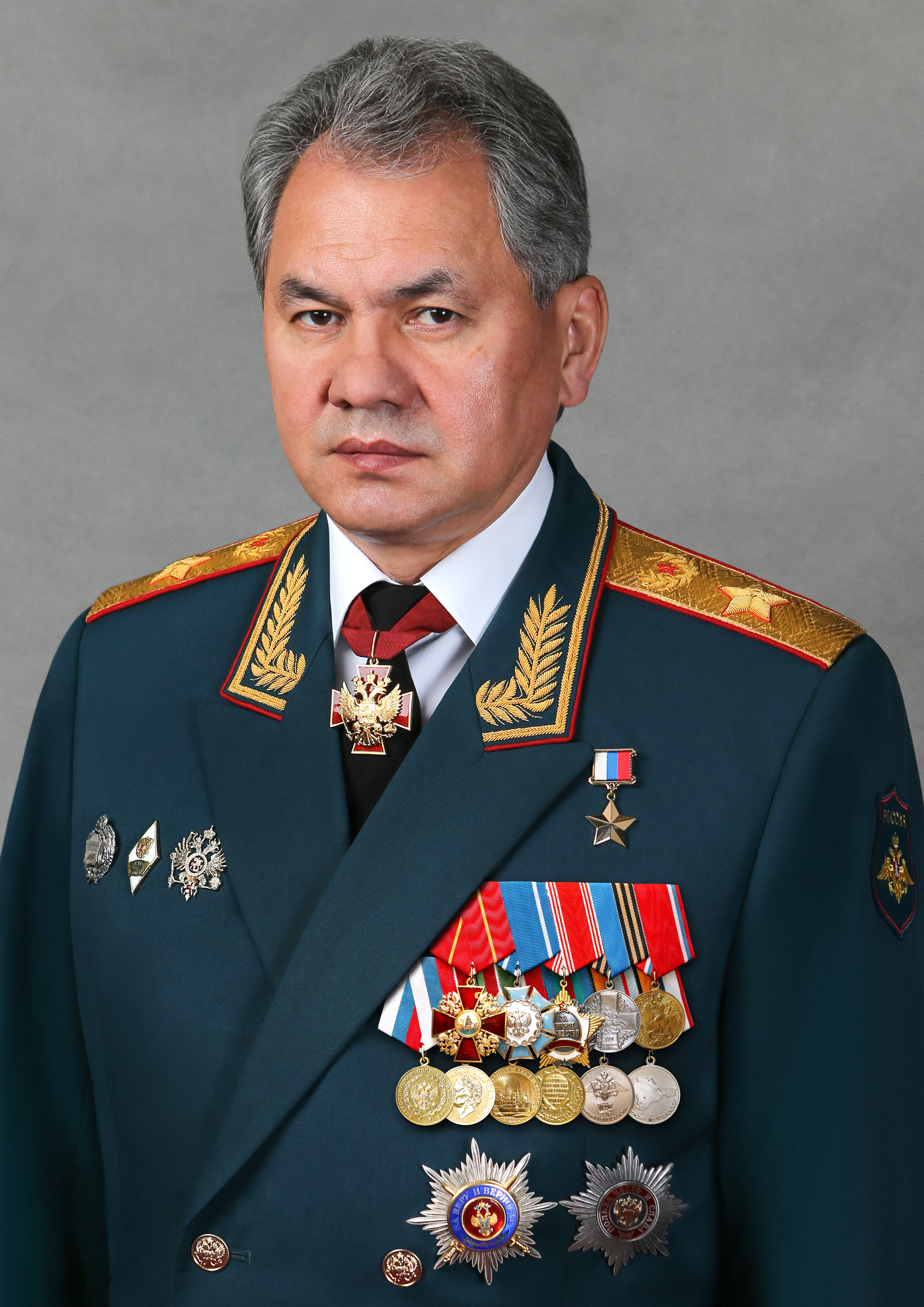
Former Minister of Defense of the Russian Federation Sergei Shoigu

Purges in the Russian Ministry of Defense (Russian: "Чистки в Минобороны РФ") is a set of organizational measures to verify the compliance of members of the Ministry of Defense of the Russian Federation with the requirements imposed on them in 2024. A dozen people lost their posts, and seven of them were arrested. Some publications link the arrests of criminal prosecution officials with the resignation of Sergei Shoigu on May 12.

== Chronology of dismissals and arrests ==
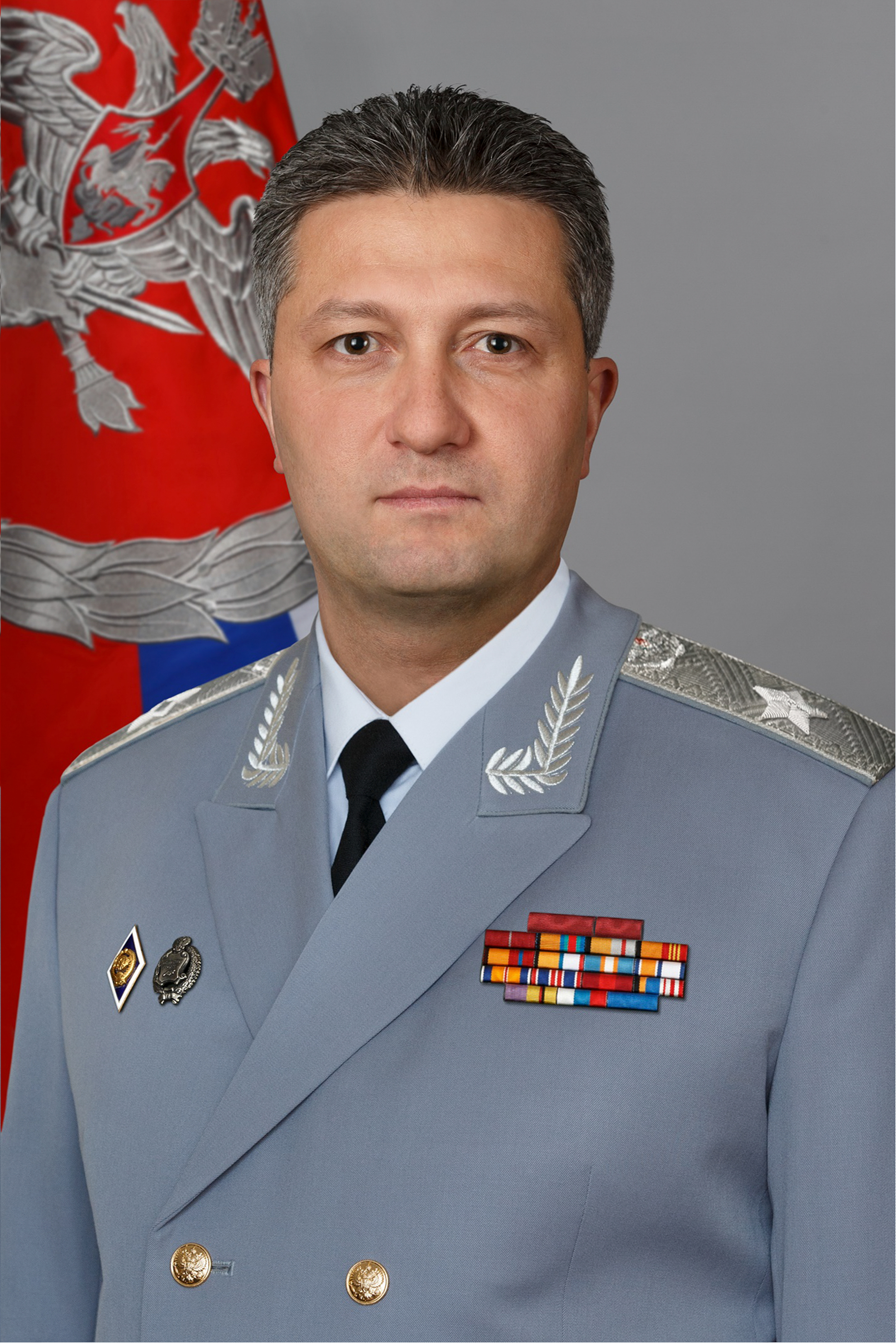
Former Deputy Minister of Defense of the Russian Federation Timur Ivanov

On April 24, 2024, Deputy Minister of Defense Timur Ivanov was detained and arrested the next day on charges of a crime under Part 6 of Article 290 of the Criminal Code of the Russian Federation. As a result of the case, Ivanov was removed from his post.

On May 12, 2024, Sergei Shoigu was dismissed and replaced by economist Andrey Belousov. Professor of the Financial University Konstantin Simonov noted:

We can state that large-scale purges have begun in the Ministry of Defense, and decision-making will begin based on the results of inspections carried out long ago. That is, the folders, I think, were on the leaders for a long time, this is not the result of the activities of the new minister, this also applies to Timur Ivanov, and, again, there were rumors that its development had been carried out for several years, that is, long before serious decisions. Now we understand that the situation with Timur Ivanov was a preparation, including for the public, to understand the upcoming decision on the Minister of Defense. In this regard, it was the signal that needed to be correctly caught and digested. Now a serious cleansing, in my opinion, of the ministry itself will begin, and Belousov will be a symbol of this self-renewal.

On May 14, 2024, according to some sources, Sergei Shoigu’s first deputy, Ruslan Tsalikov, submitted his resignation.

First Deputy Minister for Military-Technical Support Alexey Krivoruchko decided to resign of his own free will, and now the FSB and the Investigative Committee are preparing a case of fraud.

On May 14, 2024, Lieutenant General, Head of the Main Personnel Directorate of the Russian Ministry of Defense, Yuri Kuznetsov was arrested.

On May 17, 2024, the court arrested Major General Ivan Popov, former commander of the 58th Guards Combined Arms Army. Popov faced up to 10 years in prison for embezzlement amounting to more than 100 million rubles.

On May 20, 2024, Colonel General Yuriy Sadovenko, Head of the Office of the Russian Minister of Defense in 2013-2024, was removed from his post. On the same day, former auditor of the Accounts Chamber Oleg Savelyev was appointed deputy head of the Russian Ministry of Defense.

On May 22, 2024, Lieutenant General Vadim Shamarin, Head of the Main Directorate of Communications of the Russian Armed Forces and Deputy Chief of the Russian General Staff, was arrested, allegedly for a bribe.

On May 22, 2024, “in connection with the transition to a new job,” the press secretary of the Ministry of Defense, Rossiana Markovskaya, resigned (Sergei Shoigu appointed her as his press secretary in November 2017).

On May 23, 2024, Vladimir Verteletsky, an employee of the Ministry of Defense Department for State Defense, was detained.

On May 23, 2024, the commander of the 20th Guards Combined Arms Army, Major General Sukhrab Akhmedov, was removed from his post. According to Vladimir Rogov, it has only just been removed, but “the situation is evolving”.

On August 2, 2024, Vyacheslav Akhmedov, director of the Patriot Park was arrested along with Major General Vladimir Shesterov, deputy of the Defense Ministry’s innovations department, on charges of embezzling its funds.

On August 29, 2024, Former Deputy Minister of Defense Pavel Popov was arrested. He was accused of misappropriating funds intended for the Patriot Park to renovate his personal proprieties, as well as coercing the park's contractors to do work on his personal properties without pay.

== See also ==
- Purge of the Red Army in 1941
- Purges of the Communist Party of the Soviet Union
- List of people convicted of corruption in Russia
