= Corruption in Russia =

Corruption is considered a very serious problem in Russia, impacting various aspects of life, including the economy, business, politics, public administration, law enforcement, healthcare, and education. It hinders economic development, contributes to inequality, and undermines democracy and human rights. The phenomenon of corruption is strongly established in the historical model of public governance, and attributed to the general weakness of the rule of law in the country. Transparency International stated in 2022, "Corruption is endemic in Russia", and assigned it the lowest score of any European country in their Corruption Perceptions Index for 2021. It has, under the regime of Vladimir Putin, been variously characterized as a kleptocracy, an oligarchy, and a plutocracy; owing to its crony capitalism economic system. As of the 2025 Corruption Perceptions Index, Russia scored 22/100 and ranked 157th of 182 countries. According to Transparency International, Russia’s scores of 22 in 2024 and 2025 are the country's worst results since the current scoring system was introduced in 2012.

== Spread of corruption in Russia ==
According to Richard Palmer, the Central Intelligence Agency's (CIA) station chief in the United States embassy in Moscow in the early 1990s, the dissolution of the Soviet Union and the rise of Russia coincided with the illegal dispersal of the equivalent of billions of dollars from the Soviet state treasury into private accounts across Europe and the U.S. This was done by elites from "every corner" of the Soviet system using knowledge of Western banking developed by the KGB during the Cold War. Palmer described it as if in the United States, "the majority of the members at Congress as well as by the Departments of Justice and Treasury, and agents of the FBI, CIA, DIA, IRS, Marshal Service, Border Patrol; state and local police officers; the Federal Reserve Bank; Supreme Court justices” were engaging in "massive corruption".

The average size of the bribe increased during the presidency of Dmitry Medvedev. According to the Russian Interior Ministry's Department for Combating Economic Crimes, the average bribe amounted to 9,000 rubles in 2008; 23,000 rubles in 2009; 61,000 rubles in 2010; and 236,000 rubles in 2011—making the average bribe in 2011 26 times greater than the average bribe in 2008, many times the inflation rate for the same period.

The 2025 Corruption Perceptions Index scored the public sectors of 182 countries on a scale from 0 ("highly corrupt") to 100 ("very clean") and then ranked those countries by score. The country ranked first is perceived to have the most honest public sector. Russia ranked 157th with a score of 22. This, along with its score of 22 in 2024, are its lowest scores since the current system of scoring began in 2012. For comparison with worldwide scores, the best score was 89 (ranked first), the average score was 42, and the worst score was 9 (ranked 181st, in a two-way tie). For comparison with regional scores, the best score among Eastern European and Central Asian countries (Note: Albania, Armenia, Azerbaijan, Belarus, Bosnia and Herzegovina, Georgia, Kazakhstan, Kosovo, Kyrgyzstan, Moldova, Montenegro, North Macedonia, Russia, Serbia, Tajikistan, Turkey, Turkmenistan, Ukraine, Uzbekistan) was 50, the average score was 34 and the worst score was 17.

At the beginning of Vladimir Putin's second term as president, Russia's rank in the Corruption Perceptions Index deteriorated from 90th place in 2004 to 126th place in 2005—a drop of 36 places.

According to Sergei Ivanov, the Kremlin chief of staff, the most corrupt spheres in Russia (in terms of household corruption) are healthcare, education, housing and communal services. In comparison, independent experts from RBC magazine name law-enforcement agencies (including the State Traffic Safety Inspectorate) as the most corrupt sphere in Russia, which is followed by healthcare, education, housing and communal services, and social security services. At the government level, however, the five top areas for corruption are as follows: government contracts and purchases; issuance of permits and certificates; law-enforcement agencies; land distribution and land relations; construction.

Estimates of the cost of corruption in Russia vary. According to official government statistics from Rosstat, the "shadow economy" occupied only 15% of Russia's GDP in 2011, and this included unreported salaries (to avoid taxes and social payments) and other types of tax evasion. According to Rosstat's estimates, corruption in 2011 amounted to only 3.5 to 7% of GDP. In comparison, some independent experts maintain that corruption consumes as much as 25% of Russia's GDP. There is also an interesting shift in the main focus of bribery: whereas previously officials took bribes to shut their eyes to legal infractions, they now take them simply to perform their duties. Many experts admit that since the 2010s, corruption in Russia has become a business. In the 1990s, businessmen had to pay different criminal groups to provide a "krysha" (literally, a "roof", i.e., protection). Nowadays, this "protective" function is performed by officials. Corrupt hierarchies characterize different sectors of the economy, including education.

In the end, the Russian population pays for this corruption. For example, some experts believe that the rapid increases in tariffs for housing, water, gas and electricity, which significantly outpace the rate of inflation, are a direct result of high volumes of corruption at the highest levels. Since the 2010s, the reaction to corruption has changed: starting from Putin's second term, very few corruption cases have been the subject of outrage. Putin's system is remarkable for its ubiquitous and open merging of the civil service and business, as well as its use of relatives, friends, and acquaintances to benefit from budgetary expenditures and take over state property. Corporate, property, and land raiding is commonplace. The result has been one of a normalization of corruption.

Some scholars argue that the establishment in Russia of an authoritarian regime and a hierarchical society based on the state-corporatist economy, where the diffusion of corrupt practices is one of the indispensable mechanisms for the maintenance of the entire system of power, represents a fundamental obstacle to the implementation of effective criminal policy in the fight against corruption.

=== Corruption in military ===
- In April 2024, Russian Deputy Defense Minister Timur Ivanov was arrested by Russian federal authorities, accused of accepting bribes "on a particularly large scale."
- Former Deputy Defense Minister Dmitry Bulgakov.
- Chief of the Main Personnel Directorate, Lieutenant General Yury Vasilyevich Kuznetsov
- On May 22, 2024, Lieutenant General, Head of the Main Directorate of Communications of the Armed Forces, Deputy Chief of the General Staff, Lieutenant General Vadim Shamarin, was arrested, allegedly for a bribe.
- Head of the Department for Providing State Defense Orders Vladimir Verteletsky.
- General Director of the Military Construction Company Andrey Belkov.
- On July 30, the general Director of Voentorg Vladimir Pavlov was detained and the next day charged with fraud on a particularly large scale.
- On August 2, 2024, Vyacheslav Akhmedov, director of the Patriot Park, was arrested along with Major General Vladimir Shesterov, deputy of the Defense Ministry’s innovations department, on charges of embezzling its funds.

== Anti-corruption efforts ==
An anticorruption campaign in modern Russia began on 4 April 1992, when President Boris Yeltsin issued a decree entitled "The fight against corruption in the public service". This document prohibited officials from engaging in business activities. Moreover, state employees were required to provide information about their income, personal property and real estate holdings, bank deposits and securities, as well as financial liabilities. The implementation of the decree, which formed the basis of the laws on combating corruption and on civil service, was vested in the presidential control directorate. Russia passed the first package of anti-corruption laws in 2008 in response to its ratification of the UN's Convention Against Corruption and the Council of Europe's "Criminal Law Convention on Corruption". The decree "On Anti-Corruption Measures" was signed by President Dmitry Medvedev in May of that year. Since then, numerous changes have been implemented to Russia's anti-corruption legislation with the purpose of combating bribery and improving its business climate. The Russian anti-corruption campaign is an ongoing effort by the Russian government to curb corruption, which has been recognized as one of Russia's most serious problems. Central documents in the campaign include the National Anti-Corruption Plan, introduced by Medvedev in 2009, and the National Anti-Corruption Strategy, introduced in 2010. The central organ in the campaign is the Anti-Corruption Council, established in 2008. Medvedev has made fighting corruption one of the top agendas of his presidency. In the first meeting of the Council on 30 September 2008, Medvedev said: "I will repeat one simple, but very painful thing. Corruption in our country has become rampant. It has become commonplace and characterises the life of the Russian society." In 2022, international commitments which helped reform national legislation are being dropped, since in 2022, Russia initiated its withdrawal from the Criminal Law Convention on Corruption and the participation of civil society in the fight against corruption has consistently been closed.

=== The anti-money-laundering initiative ===
Corruption has an obvious connection with money laundering as the stolen assets of a corrupt public official are useless unless they are placed, layered, and integrated into the global financial network. The proceeds of corruption may be laundered in jurisdictions without strict anti-money laundering measures and in countries with strict banking secrecy. This is the reason why the "de-offshorization" policy endorsed by President Putin in 2012 and 2013 (after the Cyprus Affaire) is often considered to be a new anti-corruption measure. The government's recent initiatives for gradually strengthening control over the financial operations of organisations and citizens have been the subject of The Russian Federal Financial Monitoring Service ("Rosfinmonitoring"). A law was passed on 30 June 2013, which introduced legal amendments aimed at increasing the transparency of currency transactions and strengthening anti-money laundering measures in Russia. The law increases control over financial operations of businesses and citizens.

The most important amendments for businesses are those that modify the regulation of banking activity. The amendments considerably affect credit organizations, which would most likely be required to amend their internal anti-money laundering policies and procedures for the identification of customers. They allow the bankers to demand disclosure of the transaction purpose from the client. However, doing so can impede the conduct of business, including a potential delay in payments.

=== National Plan to Counter Corruption ===
Russian President Vladimir Putin approved a new national anti-corruption plan for the period from 2014 to 2015. The president ordered executive and legislative authorities by 1 July 2014 to make relevant amendments to their anti-corruption plans and to ensure control over their execution. A relevant order was included in the National Plan to Counter Corruption for 2014–2015.

The governor of the Komi Republic was arrested for stealing money from state funds.

=== Anti-Corruption Foundation ===
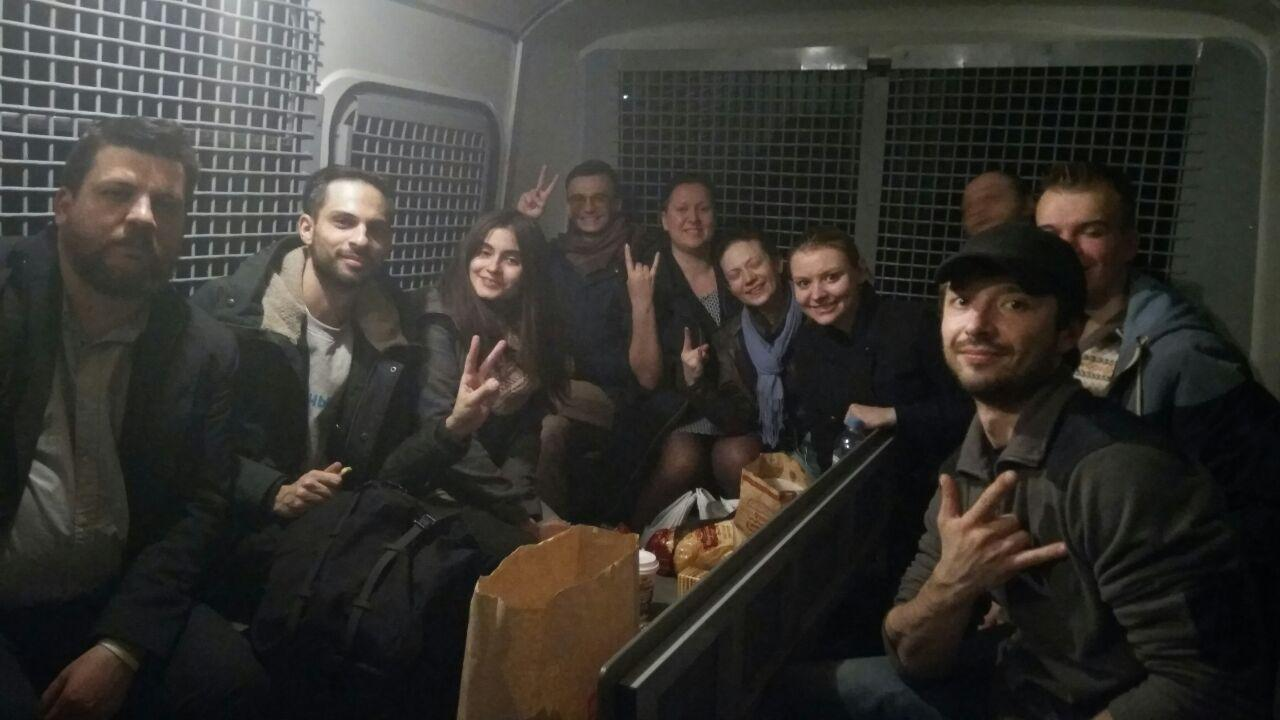
Volunteers and employees of the Anti-Corruption Foundation arrested on 26 March 2017

Anti-Corruption Foundation is a nonprofit organization based in Moscow, established in 2011 by activist and politician Alexei Navalny. Its main goal is to investigate and expose corruption cases among high-ranking Russian government officials, which they have been successfully doing for the last few years.

This nongovernmental organization, throughout its existence, has carried out several investigations and has presented different reports with regard to the involvement of high-level officials in corruption. However, these materials have been neglected by the criminal justice system and have only been taken into account in order to discredit this organization.

He Is Not Dimon to You is a 2017 Russian documentary film detailing alleged corruption by Dmitry Medvedev, who was Prime Minister of Russia at the time of release. The film estimates that $1.2 billion was embezzled by Dmitry Medvedev. The video received about 1.5 million views in its first day. A week later, this increased to 7 million, exceeding the result of Chaika, another film by Alexei Navalny and the Anti-Corruption Foundation. By May 2019, the video reached 30 million views.

In 2019, the Anti-Corruption Foundation was recognized by a Russian court as a foreign agent. In 2021, a trial was launched to recognize the organization as extremist and to liquidate it.

=== Citizen participation ===
In September 2023, Russian YouTuber Alexander Nozdrinov was sentenced to 8.5 years in prison for spreading "false information" about the Russian armed forces in Ukraine. He was detained in March 2022 after investigators accused him of publishing a photo of a bombed-out building in Kyiv. Nozdrinov addressed corruption by local authorities on his YouTube channel and denied posting a photo from Ukraine. His lawyer, Olesya Panyuzheva said the case against Nozdrinov showed that "anyone who … has a public activity, uncovers crimes and wrongdoings of corrupt police officers and representatives of the court and other law enforcement agencies, can be put behind bars."

== Research ==
Transparency International Russia's report from 2012 shows a variety of activities that give citizens a chance to monitor corruption. It collaborated with the Youth Human Rights movement on a large-scale campaign in 20 cities to check police officers' identification tags. This is a proactive exercise to stop petty corruption. If an officer can be identified, he or she is less likely to ask for a bribe. Transparency International Russia also monitors the income statements of Russian public officials with the help of students and publishes the results, and monitors the use of 600 million rubles (US$19 million) of public funds to socially oriented NGOs, and found several cases of conflict of interest. It provided analysis and recommendations on making this process more transparent and accountable. The NGO works cooperatively with all individuals and groups, with for-profit and not-for-profit corporations and organisations, and with bodies committed to the fight against corruption. It undertakes professional analysis and papers on corruption-related issues, trying to explain the reasons for the spread of corruption, its political and social implications and trying to analyse the possible scenarios for the future.

On 9 December 2014 Novosti agency reported that the head of the National Anti-Corruption Committee Kirill Kabanov admitted on air that a third of Russian officials were corrupt. As of 2015, Russian officials are periodically accused of spending on luxury cars, mansions or clothes worth significantly more than their declared income.

A 2018 study of state corruption in Russia during the 1750s–1830s found that "as far as we could tell on the basis of our sample of records, the volume of resources extracted from the population through ‘routine’ corruption appears to have been surprisingly low." The authors write, "every little interaction with state officials involved paying a fee to the clerks, and such fees, although technically illegal, were so common and commonly accepted as to be entered in the account books alongside other operational expenses. On the other hand, these ‘routine’ payments were really quite small, especially if apportioned on a per capita basis among the entire commune ... Such fees appear to have been largely customary in nature, a part of the traditional economy of gift-giving, demonstrating respect, and maintaining informal relationships (‘good disposition’). Yet, even such a low level of per capita extraction would have allowed key district officials to amass significant amounts, at a very minimum tripling their salaries."

The Russian Prosecutor General Office reported that of the persons convicted for corruption in 2017, the number of law enforcement functionaries and parliamentaries (nearly 2,200 persons) constituted over 11%.

== See also ==
- List of people convicted of corruption in Russia
- 2017 Russian protests
- 2021 Russian protests
