= Fanil =

Fanil (Russian: Фанил) is a masculine given name. Notable people with the name include:

- Fanil Sungatulin (born 2001), Russian football player
- Fanil Sarvarov (1969–2025), Russian lieutenant general
