= Valery Gerasimov =

Russian general (born 1955)

- Валерий Герасимов
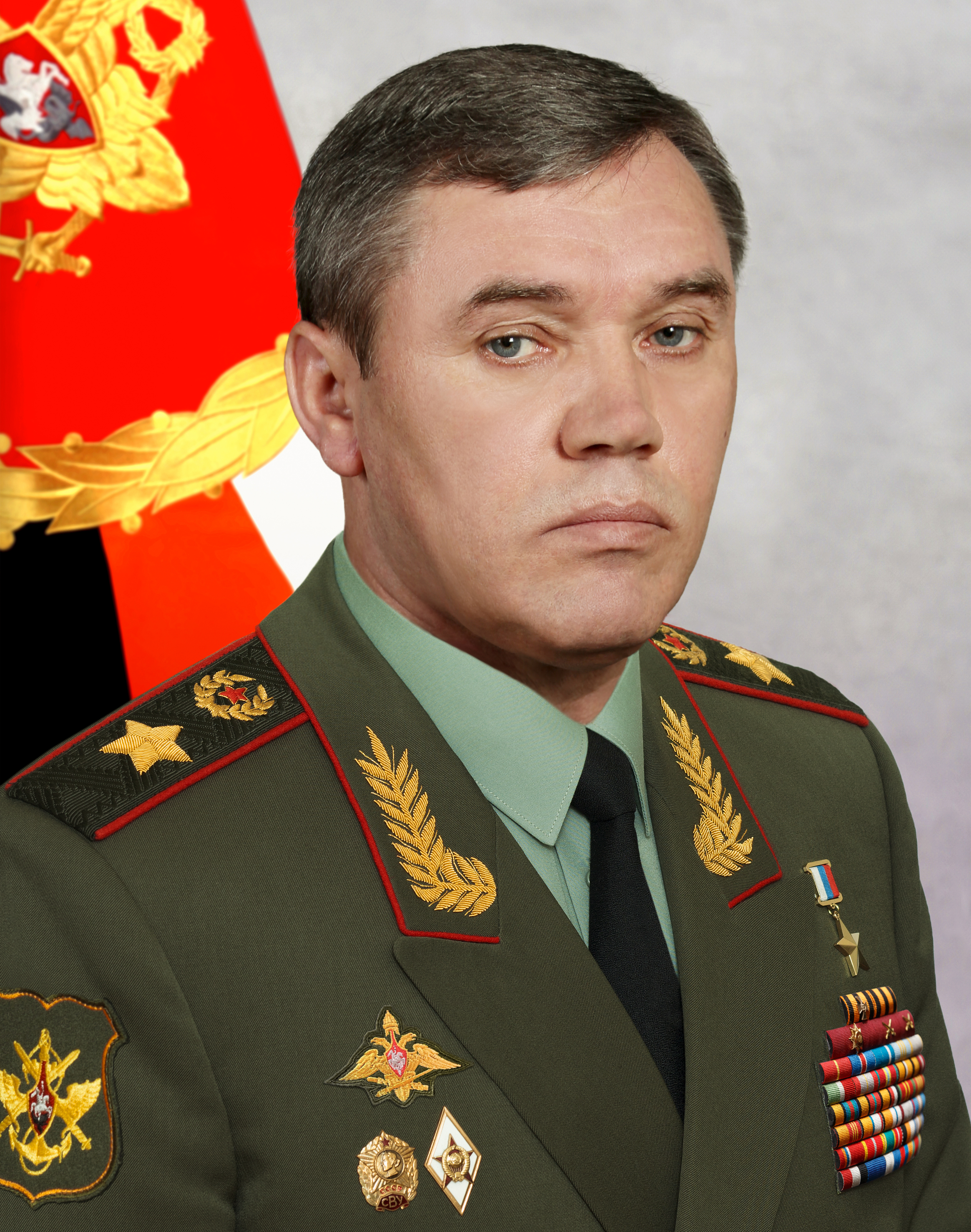
- Official portrait, 2013
- Born: 8 September 1955 (age 71); Kazan, Tatar ASSR, Soviet Union
- Education: Kazan Higher Tank Command School; Malinovsky Military Armored Forces Academy; Russian General Staff Academy
- Military career
- Allegiance: Soviet Union (to 1991); Russia
- Branch: Soviet Army; Russian Ground Forces
- Service years: 1977–present
- Rank: General of the Army
- Commands: Chief of the General Staff Joint Group of Forces in the Special Military Operation; Central Military District; Moscow Military District; Leningrad Military District; 58th Army; 144th Guards Motor Rifle Division
- Conflicts: Second Chechen War; Battle of Galashki; Syrian civil war; Russian military intervention in Syria; Russo-Ukrainian war; War in Donbas; Battle of Ilovaisk; 2022 Russian invasion of Ukraine; Battle of Izium; 2023 Ukrainian counteroffensive; Kursk campaign
- Awards: Hero of the Russian Federation; Order of Honour; Order of St. George; Order "For Merit to the Fatherland"

General of the Army Valery Vasilyevich Gerasimov (Note: In this name that follows East Slavic naming customs, the patronymic is Vasilyevich and the family name is Gerasimov.) (Note: Russian: Вале́рий Васи́льевич Гера́симов, IPA: [vɐˈlʲerʲɪj vɐˈsʲilʲjɪvʲɪdʑ‿ɡʲɪˈrasʲɪməf]) (born 8 September 1955) is a Russian military officer who has been the Chief of the General Staff of the Russian Armed Forces and first deputy minister of defense since 2012. His previous commands included three military districts and a combined arms army.

Gerasimov was born in Kazan and was commissioned in the Soviet Army after graduating from the Kazan Higher Tank Command School in 1977. He later also attended the Malinovsky Military Armored Forces Academy and the Russian General Staff Academy. Gerasimov is a combat veteran of the Second Chechen War, during which he was chief of staff and then commander of the 58th Combined Arms Army. He later commanded the Leningrad, Moscow, and Central Military Districts.

He was appointed as Chief of the General Staff by President Vladimir Putin on 9 November 2012, replacing Nikolai Makarov. After the seizure of Crimea in 2014 and the Russian intervention in the Syrian civil war, Gerasimov became increasingly influential in the Russian security establishment. He is considered one of the most powerful men in Russia, and one of three people to hold access to Russia's nuclear weapons, alongside Putin and the minister of defense. Gerasimov has been described as a loyal follower of Putin. He is reportedly the one who conceived the Gerasimov doctrine.

On 11 January 2023, he was appointed as the commander of the Joint Group of Forces in the Russo-Ukrainian war, replacing Sergey Surovikin. In 2024, the International Criminal Court issued an arrest warrant for Gerasimov on charges of alleged war crimes for his role in the Russian invasion of Ukraine.

== Early life ==
Gerasimov was born in a working-class family in Kazan, Tatar ASSR on 8 September 1955. Interested in the army from a young age, Gerasimov grew up on the stories of his veteran uncle, a former tank company commander, and avidly read the books of Konstantin Simonov. After fourth grade Gerasimov's father sent his documents for admission to the Kazan Suvorov Military School, but that year the military school programs were reduced to two years' duration. Nonetheless, Gerasimov entered the military school four years later in 1971. Graduating from the Suvorov military school in 1973 with a gold medal, Gerasimov was admitted to the Kazan Higher Tank Command School for officer training.

== Rise to field army command ==
Having graduated from the four-year school with honors in 1977, he began his service in Poland as a tank platoon commander in the 80th Tank Regiment of the 90th Guards Tank Division of the Northern Group of Forces. Gerasimov rose to tank company commander and tank battalion chief of staff before being transferred to the 5th Combined Arms Army of the Far Eastern Military District in 1982. He served there as chief of staff of a tank battalion of the 185th Tank Regiment of the 29th Motor Rifle Division, and was promoted to command the tank battalion of the 231st Motor Rifle Regiment of the 40th Motor Rifle Division. Gerasimov was admitted to the Malinovsky Military Armored Forces Academy in 1984 for advanced officer training. Graduating with honors in 1987, he was posted to the Baltic Military District, serving as chief of staff of and then commanding the 228th Tank Regiment of the 144th Guards Motor Rifle Division. After being promoted to chief of staff of the division, Gerasimov took command of the 144th Guards in 1993, and supervised its withdrawal to Russia in August 1994. Colonel Gerasimov commanded the division until 1995.

Having demonstrated his command abilities in this, Gerasimov was selected to attend the Military Academy of the General Staff of the Armed Forces of Russia in 1995. Graduating with honors in 1997, he was appointed first deputy commander of the 1st Guards Tank Army and then sent to take the same position with the 58th Combined Arms Army in 1998. The title of Gerasimov's position was changed to army chief of staff and he served in this position while Vladimir Shamanov was army commander. Gerasimov took part in the Second Chechen War in this post, responsible for the logistics and operational planning of the 58th Army. Major General Gerasimov was in a convoy that got ambushed near the village of Bamut, and he fought the attackers, rifle in hand, until reinforcements arrived. When Shamanov left to begin his political career, Gerasimov acted as army commander from late 2000, and was confirmed in this position in February 2001. The 58th Army under Lieutenant General Gerasimov secured the borders of Ingushetia to stop militants from Chechnya and Georgia. In September 2002 he personally led an operation against Ruslan Gelayev's band of fighters that crossed the border from Georgia into Russia's Chechnya and Ingushetia. The operation resulted in the recapture of the village of Galashki and the rout of the group. His involvement in the arrest of Yury Budanov led to praise from journalist Anna Politkovskaya.

== Senior postings ==
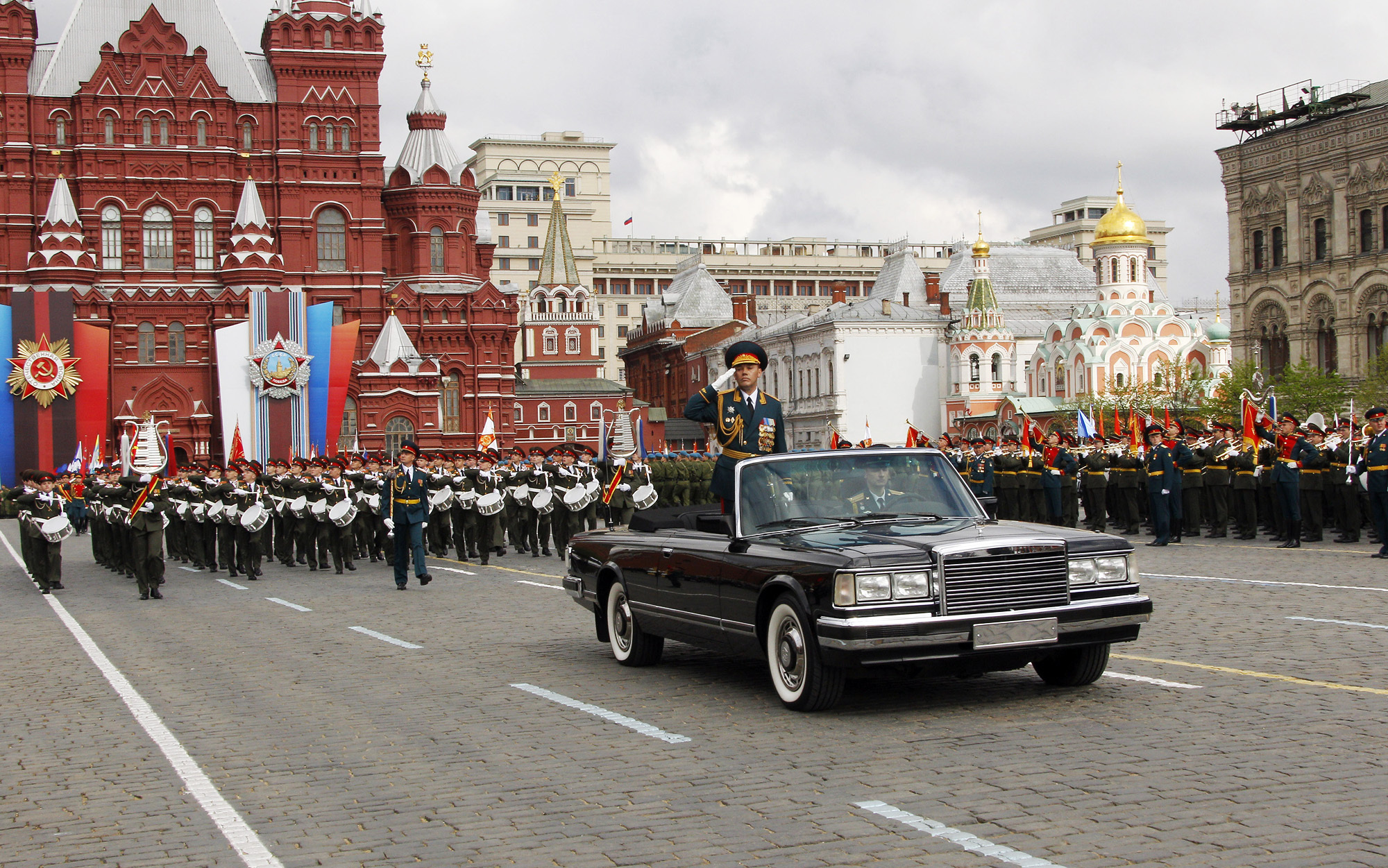
General Gerasimov leading a Victory Day parade in Moscow in a ZiL 41044, May 2011

Gerasimov was promoted to chief of staff of the Far Eastern Military District in March 2003, and was appointed chief of the Main Combat Training and Service Directorate of the General Staff in April 2005. In 2006 he was sent back to the North Caucasus as chief of staff of the North Caucasus Military District, and in December 2006 appointed commander of the Leningrad Military District, a significant promotion.

During his tenure, Gerasimov significantly reduced crime and desertion within the Leningrad Military District, and had a good reputation among human rights activists, who noted that he treated subordinates with respect and was willing to speak with representatives of civil society. He was transferred to command the Moscow Military District, assuming command on 10 February 2009. He was also known to support the Serdyukov-Makarov reforms to the military. In November 2010 he was nominated as deputy chief of the General Staff, appointed on 23 December 2010. Oleg Salyukov also held that position along with Gerasimov, and they served under Chief of the General Staff Nikolai Makarov.

He commanded the annual Victory Day Parade on Red Square four times from 2009 to 2012. On 28 April 2012, Gerasimov was appointed commander of the Central Military District, one of the new military districts created two years earlier as part of the military reform.

== Chief of the General Staff ==
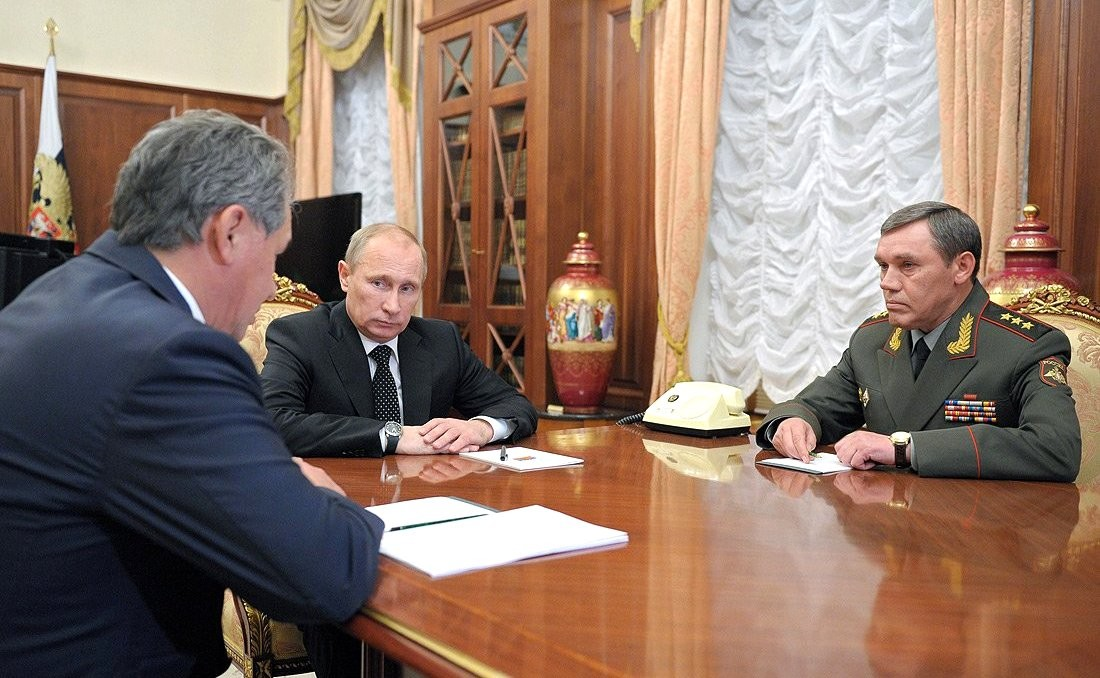
Gerasimov with President Vladimir Putin and Defence Minister Sergey Shoigu, 9 November 2012

Gerasimov became the longest-serving Chief of the General Staff in Russia's history since the 1917 Russian Revolution. Unlike many of Defense Minister Sergey Shoigu's other appointments, in which he stressed personal relationships, he made no reference of any previous connection to Gerasimov, so his choice has been interpreted as being due to Gerasimov's military experience. He is considered one of the most powerful men in Russia, and one of three people to hold access to Russia's nuclear weapons, alongside Putin and the minister of defense. Gerasimov has been described as a loyal follower of Putin.

On 26 February 2013 Gerasimov published an article called "The Value of Science is Foresight" in the military journal Voyenno-promyshlennyy Kur'yer on the basis of which, Gerasimov was alleged to have conceived the "Gerasimov doctrine" – combining military, technological, information, diplomatic, economic, cultural and other tactics for the purpose of achieving strategic goals. The author of the original paper that called it the "Gerasimov doctrine," Mark Galeotti, claimed that his work was misunderstood, and that it was not Russian doctrine, but a Russian perspective of Western foreign policy. In 2017, Gerasimov explained his doctrine to the Financial Times.

=== Staff appointment up to full-scale war (2012–2020) ===
Gerasimov was appointed Chief of the General Staff following the dismissal of Defence Minister Anatoly Serdyukov on 6 November. After the dismissal of Serdyukov as defense minister, his successor Sergey Shoigu nominated Gerasimov to be the next Chief of the General Staff, replacing Nikolai Makarov. Putin approved Gerasimov's nomination on 9 November. Makarov was seen as close to Serduykov and was seen by commentators as likely to be replaced by the new defense minister. It has been reported that Makarov resigned, but he was formally dismissed by Putin. Gerasimov was promoted to the four-star rank of general of the army.

In December 2012 Gerasimov said that the Russian military will not become an all-volunteer force, with conscription to continue, and that some of the current reforms will be adjusted. Among the adjustments were the recreation of some divisions in the Ground Forces, which had all been turned into brigades, though many of the new divisions were smaller than a normal division. In March 2013, Gerasimov announced the founding of the Special Operations Forces Command (KSSO), which has been compared to the U.S. Delta Force. After discussions in the Security Council of Russia in the summer of 2013, a plan was announced by Gerasimov and the Ministry of Defense for the development of the Russian Armed Forces through 2020. The delivery of new equipment to over 400 military units was due to begin in 2016. In June 2014, Nikolai Bogdanovsky was appointed as the First Deputy Chief of the General Staff, likely on Gerasimov's recommendation, after he had been serving as commander of the Central Military District for the same reason.

Gerasimov is believed to not have been present at a meeting Putin held with senior officials on 22–23 February 2014, where he made the decision to intervene in Crimea, though his superior, Shoigu, was there. Russia launched large-scale military drills in early March 2014 near the Ukrainian border, which the General Staff and Gerasimov were likely involved in the planning and execution of. Both KSSO and spetsnaz GRU units, under the command of the General Staff, had a prominent role in the February and March 2014 seizure of Crimea, and the support provided to the pro-Russian separatists during the war in Donbass. In May 2014, Gerasimov said that "extremist organizations" had a decisive role in the seizure of power in Ukraine and were fighting in the Donbass. In December 2014, Gerasimov said that the Donbass war is against Russia's interests and the shared history of the Russian and Ukrainian peoples. He also said that Russia was not a party to the conflict. According to the Security Service of Ukraine, Gerasimov was the general commander during the decisive strategic victory in the Battle of Ilovaisk in 2014, where over 459 Ukrainian military personnel were killed and another 478 were injured. Ukrainian intelligence also claimed that from early 2015, Sergey Istrakov, the Deputy Chief of the General Staff under Gerasimov, was responsible for overseeing Russian military involvement in Donbass.

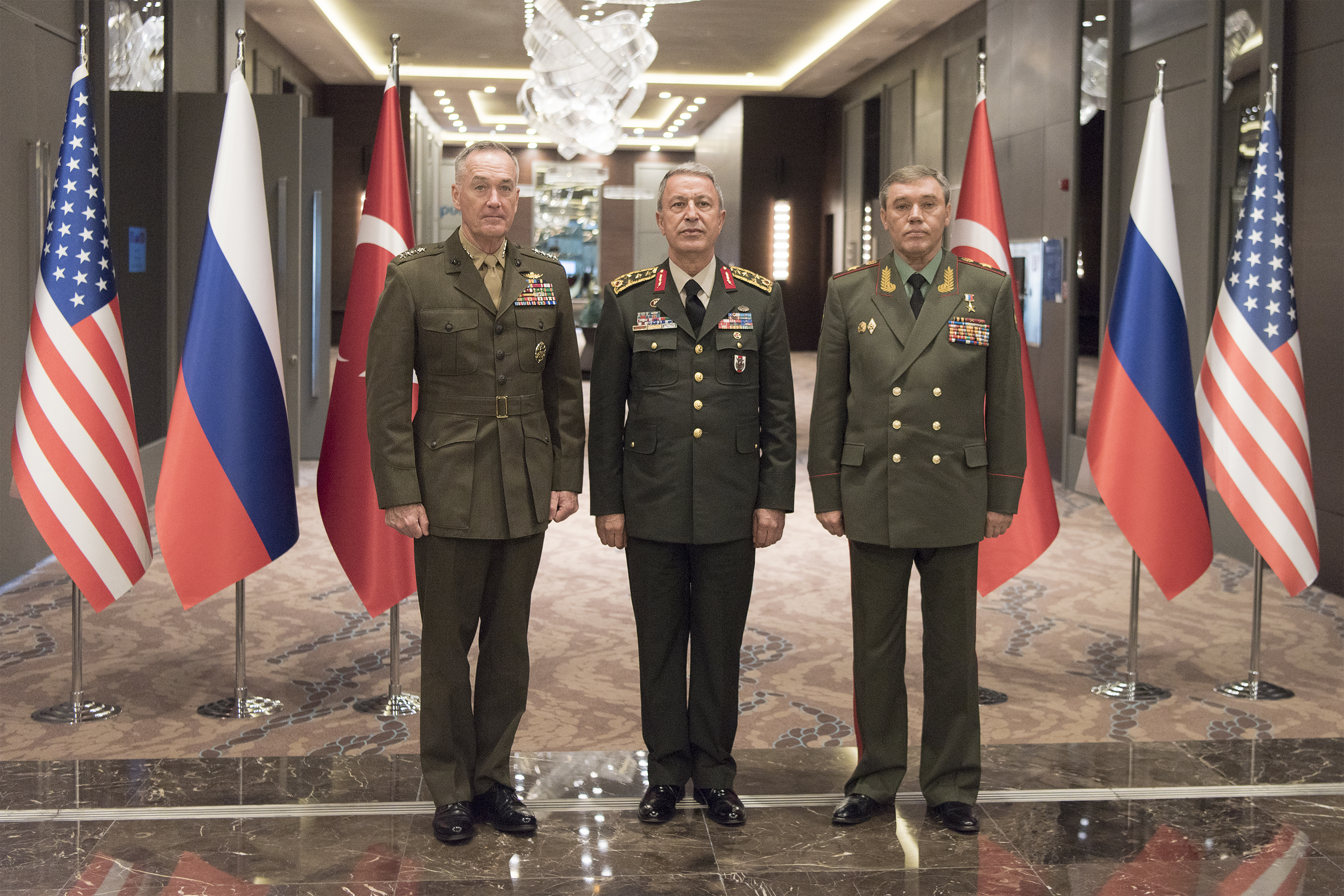
Gerasimov (right), Joseph Dunford (left) and Chief of the Turkish General Staff Hulusi Akar (middle) at a meeting to discuss their nations' operations in northern Syria, 6 March 2017

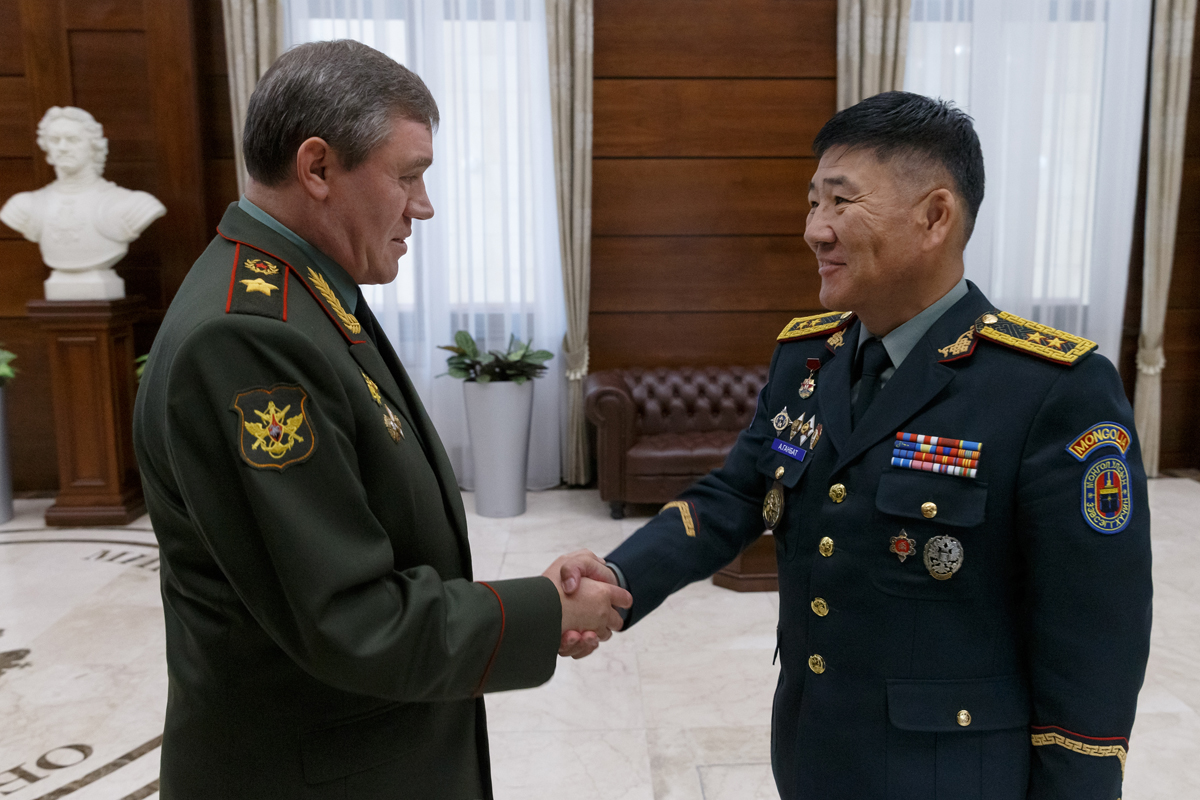
Gerasimov and Mongolia's Chief of General Staff Ayushiin Ganbat, 16 August 2019

Russia began deploying forces into Syria starting in the late summer of 2015, after the fall of the city of Palmyra to the Islamic State in May, and a formal request for help from President Bashar al-Assad in July. On or about 30 September 2015, the General Staff established a separate command, the Group of Forces in the Syrian Arab Republic. The "general planning" was done by the General Staff under Gerasimov while the "detailed planning" was done by the force group commander. In December 2015 Gerasimov had a discussion with his French Armed Forces counterpart in Moscow about cooperation against ISIS, and they also agreed "to keep an undivided and secular Syria". A campaign against the Syrian opposition in eastern Aleppo took place in the fall of 2016, Palymra was recaptured from ISIS for the final time in March 2017, and there were major advances against ISIS in central Syria up to the fall of 2017. Gerasimov announced a significant draw down of Russian forces on 23 November, and met his U.S. counterpart, Joseph Dunford, in December 2017 and January 2018 to discuss the situation in Syria. Gerasimov was also present at a meeting on Syria between Foreign Minister Sergey Lavrov and Israeli Prime Minister Benjamin Netanyahu in July 2018.

He was awarded the Russian military's highest decoration, the Order of St. George, in 2015, and the title Hero of the Russian Federation in May 2016, both for his role in the planning and execution of operations in Syria. Gerasimov was quoted in an interview, "If we did not intervene in Syria, what would have happened? ... A couple of months, and towards the end of 2015 Syria would have been fully under ISIS. Also a large part of Iraq." Gerasimov's influence in the Russian security establishment increased over the years, after the military demonstrated its usefulness as a foreign policy tool in Syria and Ukraine. Gerasimov has said that the Syrian conflict has allowed the General Staff to become more adept at hybrid warfare, and was quoted in a March 2018 speech at the General Staff Academy as saying that Russian officers were "conditioned by combat experience" in Syria to develop their ability to "forecast the situation [and] decisively act" in future wars. He said in March 2019 at the Russian Academy of Military Sciences that Syria had an "important role" in Russia developing a "strategy of limited action" that relied on "self-sufficient groupings of troops" to achieve limited objectives.

As reported in her book on Gerasimov regarding his involvement with Syria, Anna Borshchevskaya wrote:

By March 2019, Valeriy Gerasimov announced that Moscow had been pursuing a strategy of 'limited action' in Syria, and one that it hopes will guide future military action. By that point it was a description of actions that had already taken place in the previous years, and more to the point, this strategy reflected a return to Soviet and tsarist methods of 'limited wars'".

=== Prelude and invasion of Ukraine (2021–2023) ===
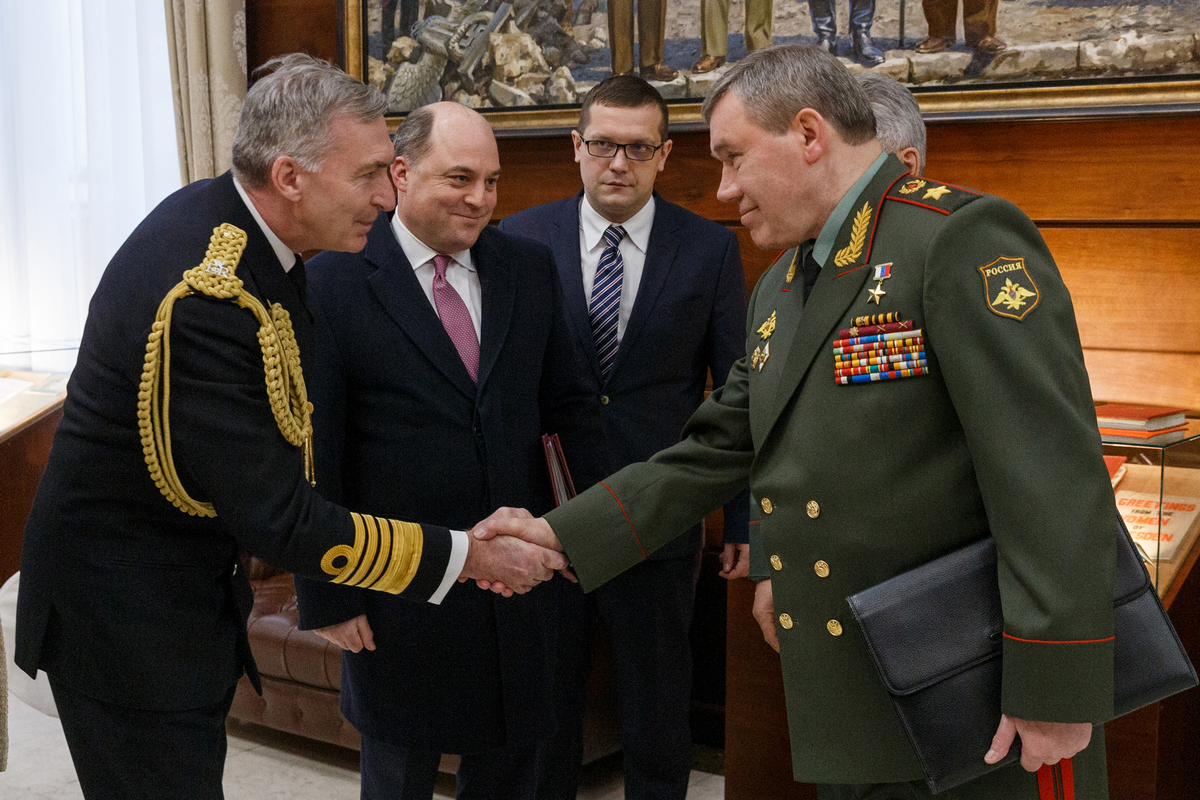
Gerasimov with UK Defense Secretary Ben Wallace and Admiral Tony Radakin in Moscow on 11 February 2022

On 9 December 2021, Gerasimov issued a warning to the Ukrainian government against attempting to settle the war in Donbass using force. Gerasimov said that "information about Russia's alleged impending invasion of Ukraine is a lie." According to Gerasimov, "Kyiv is not fulfilling the Minsk Agreements. The Ukrainian armed forces are touting that they have started to employ US-supplied Javelin anti-tank missile systems in Donbas and are also using Turkish reconnaissance/strike drones. As a result, the already tense situation in the east of that country is further deteriorating." On 23 December 2021, he discussed regional security issues with his British counterpart Admiral Sir Tony Radakin, Chief of the Defence Staff. On 11 February 2022, Gerasimov met with Tony Radakin and denied that Russia was planning to invade Ukraine. However, Gerasimov was involved in the planning of the invasion. The sources say the decision to invade Ukraine was made by Putin and a small group of war hawks around him, including Gerasimov, Shoigu and national security adviser Nikolai Patrushev.

When the invasion started in February 2022, Gerasimov and the General Staff led the operation from the National Defense Management Center in Moscow. Unlike his U.S. counterpart, the Chairman of the Joint Chiefs of Staff, Gerasimov has operational command over the Russian Armed Forces. The Russian General Staff has a warfighting role, also unlike the U.S. Joint Chiefs of Staff. They initially did not form a separate command for the operation, even after a field commander in Ukraine was appointed in April 2022. U.S. military observers noted that the General Staff's decision may have been influenced by their study of U.S. and NATO operations in the Middle East and Yugoslavia, which were also run by strategic headquarters far away from the theater. The Moscow Times considered Gerasimov to have disappeared from public view since around 12 March, though he had a conversation with French Chief of the Defence Staff Thierry Burkhard on 4 March. Other senior siloviki disappeared around the same time.

On 27 April 2022, Ukrainian publication Defense Express claimed that Gerasimov arrived in Izium to personally command the Russian offensive in the region. According to the Ukrainian Independent Information Agency, Gerasimov was wounded on 1 May 2022 near Izium. Two U.S. officials confirmed Gerasimov had been in the region but a Ukrainian official denied Ukraine was specifically targeting Gerasimov and said that when the command post was attacked, Gerasimov had already set off to return to Russia. The U.S. reportedly prevented Ukraine from killing Gerasimov. Gerasimov discussed security issues with American counterpart General Mark Milley in a phone call on 19 May. During their conversation, Gerasimov warned Milley that the U.S. supplying Ukraine any weapons with a range of over 190 miles was a red line for Russia.

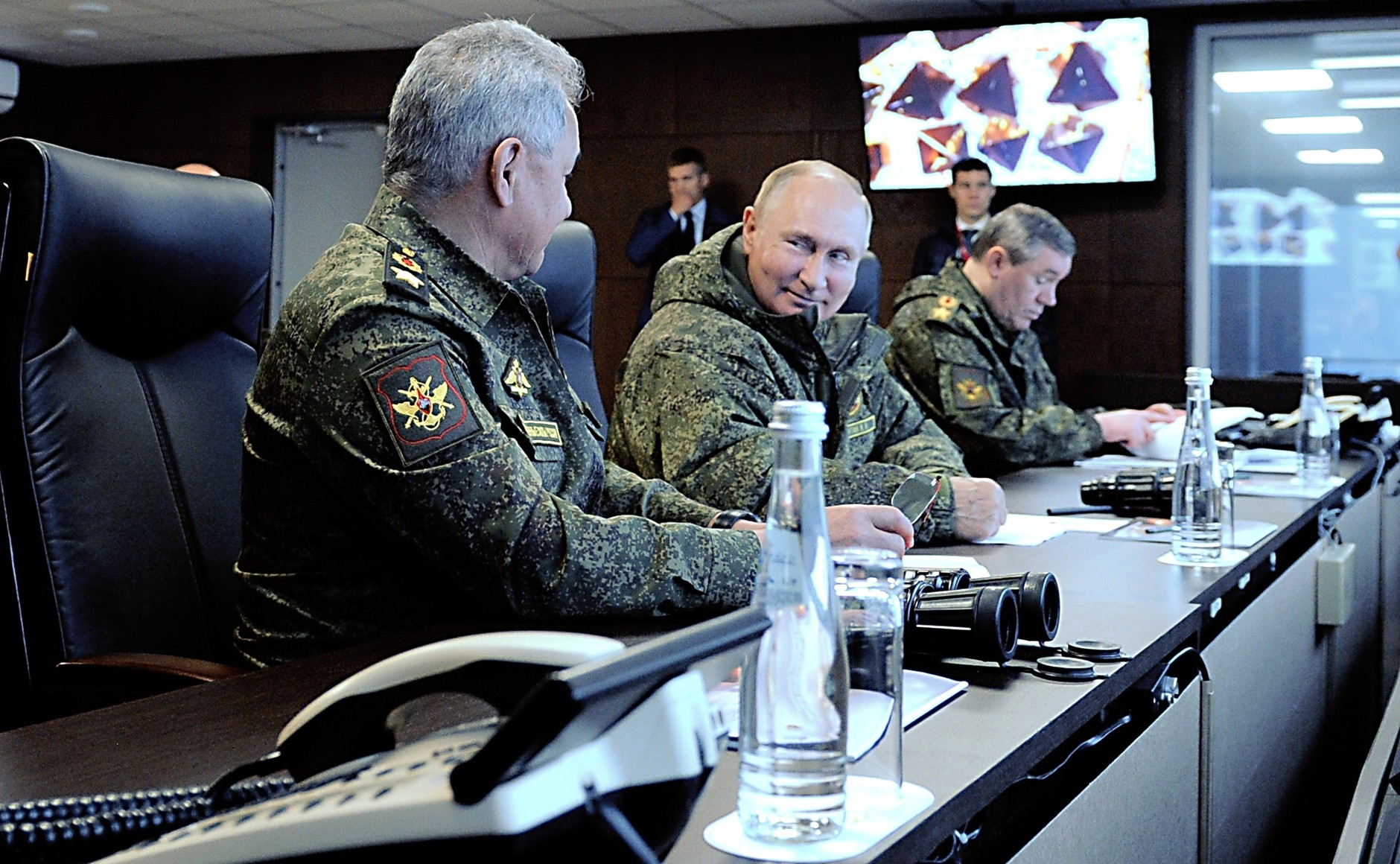
Putin, Shoigu and Gerasimov at the Vostok 2022 military exercise in the Russian Far East on 6 September 2022

Among the four groups of forces at the start of the invasion, only one, the Southern group, achieved its initial objectives, seizing the Kherson Oblast and the Zaporizhzhia Nuclear Power Plant, and concentrating firepower for the capture of Mariupol. The other three groups were removed or shifted southeast, to the Donbass and the Kharkiv Oblast. After the war of maneuver at the beginning, Russia transitioned to attrition warfare, as seen during the Donbass campaign. Russia initially attempted to fight the war with only its active-duty military during the spring and summer of 2022, but the losses became unsustainable, and as early as April 2022 Gerasimov and Shoigu pressured the government to call up reservists. In September 2022 a mobilization of members of the reserve took place for the first time since World War II. Also in September 2022, Gerasimov, Shoigu, and Putin attended the Vostok 2022 military exercises in the Russian Far East, which also included forces from China, India, Mongolia, Algeria and several post-Soviet states, among others. In December 2022 Gerasimov said that the front line was over 815 kilometers long and that the main focus of the Russian military was on "the completion of the liberation of the Donetsk People's Republic."

According to British author and policy analyst Anatol Lieven, "Not only did Shoigu and Gerasimov plan and conduct the invasion of Ukraine with monstrous incompetence, recklessness and indifference to civilian deaths and suffering, but since they have both held their present positions since 2012, they bear direct personal responsibility for the logistical chaos, lack of coordination, and generally lamentable condition of the Russian armed forces."

=== Commander of the Joint Group of Forces (2023–present) ===
On 11 January 2023, Russian Defence Minister Sergei Shoigu appointed Gerasimov in place of Sergey Surovikin as overall commander of war against Ukraine. Surovikin was made Gerasimov's deputy. Surovikin had been appointed the commander of the newly established Joint Group of Forces for the Special Military Operation, a separate command from the General Staff, in October 2022. However, U.S. military observers noted that in effect, Surovikin had already been serving as a deputy to Gerasimov. Gerasimov is believed to still spend much of his time in Moscow, instead of Rostov-on-Don, the site of the Joint Group of Forces headquarters. His first notable battle order after that was to deploy the Black Sea Fleet out of Port of Novorossiysk for parts unknown on 11 January.

The UK Ministry of Defence said in late January in an intelligence update that Gerasimov has been "attempting to clamp down on non-regulation uniform, travel in civilian vehicles, the use of mobile phones, and non-standard haircuts. The Russian force continues to endure operational deadlock and heavy casualties; Gerasimov's prioritization of largely minor regulations is likely to confirm the fears of his many skeptics in Russia." After the setbacks during the 2022 Kharkiv counteroffensive by Ukrainian forces, Surovikin had focused on building defensive positions, and this continued after Gerasimov took command, even after he launched offensives beginning in January 2023. In April 2023, American military analyst Michael Kofman said that Gerasimov is "exhausting the force with an ill-timed, feckless set of offensive operations, whose gains will not change the strategic picture for Russia, but could leave Russian forces more vulnerable." Gerasimov said in an interview around this time that "modern Russia has never before seen this level and intensity of military actions. Our country and its armed forces are being counteracted by practically the entire collective West."

In May 2023, Gerasimov and Shoigu were accused by Wagner Group chief Yevgeny Prigozhin of incompetence. On 5 May 2023, Prigozhin blamed them for "tens of thousands" of Wagner casualties, saying "Shoigu, Gerasimov, where … is the ammunition? They came here as volunteers and are dying so you can sit like fat cats in your luxury offices." On 23 June 2023, Prigozhin launched a short-lived Wagner Group rebellion, marching towards Moscow from Rostov-on-Don. On 8 July, milblogger Rybar reported that Gerasimov was replaced by Mikhail Teplinsky in command of the troops in Ukraine while remaining CGS. In July 2023, Major General Ivan Popov claimed that Gerasimov dismissed him because of his concerns about troops fighting without rest and criticism of Russian battlefield strategy. Popov indirectly accused Gerasimov and Shoigu of betraying Russian soldiers on the battlefield by failing to provide sufficient support and raised questions about "the lack of counter-battery combat, the absence of artillery reconnaissance stations and the mass deaths and injuries of [Russian soldiers] from enemy artillery."

Russia was successful against the 2023 Ukrainian counteroffensive, after which it regained the initiative in the war. In August 2023 Gerasimov's Joint Group of Forces moved the 76th Guards Air Assault Division to reinforce the Southern Group of Forces in its defense of the Zaporozhye Oblast. Gerasimov described the defeat of the counteroffensive as the main accomplishment of 2023 at the end of the year. In November 2023 Gerasimov's Joint Group of Forces moved the Central Group of Forces from Kreminna for the battle of Avdiivka. In February 2024, the battle became the Russian military's "second-most important victory after Mariupol," after which the Armed Forces of Ukraine were unable to hold back the advancing Central, Southern, or Eastern groups of forces.

In late May 2024, one of the deputy chiefs of the Russian General Staff, Lieutenant General Vadim Shamarin was arrested for corruption. This came after the arrest of Timur Ivanov shortly before the fifth inauguration of Vladimir Putin on 7 May and consequent shuffle of Shoigu, causing Newsweek to speculate on a purge in the military. On 25 June 2024, the International Criminal Court issued an arrest warrant for Gerasimov, on charges of alleged war crimes for missile strikes against Ukrainian energy infrastructure.

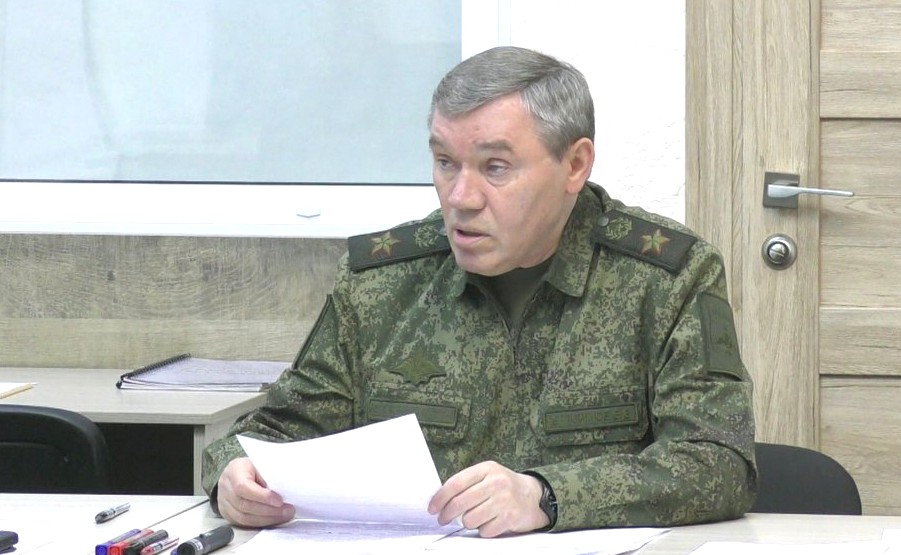
Gerasimov visiting the command center of the Kursk Group of Forces on 12 March 2025

Gerasimov reportedly ignored intelligence warnings that Ukrainian troops were massing near the Russia–Ukraine border ahead of a cross-border incursion into the Kursk region. On 7 August 2024, Gerasimov told Putin that about 1,000 Ukrainian soldiers took part in the attack and that their advance in the Kursk Oblast had been halted. Between July and November 2024, Russia's advance in eastern Ukraine accelerated to the fastest rate since 2022, with the main thrust taking place in the Donetsk region. On 26 April 2025, Gerasimov told Putin that the Kursk Oblast has been fully liberated with the recapture of the last settlement. He also praised the assistance provided by allied North Korean soldiers.

In September 2025, Gerasimov reached the mandatory retirement age of 70, but his term in office was likely extended by Putin, who in 2021 signed a law allowing presidential appointees to be exempt from the retirement age if they chose. That month he was also awarded the Order of Courage by Putin for "courage, bravery, and dedication displayed in the fulfilment of military duty."

== Dates of promotion ==
Rank	Branch	Date
Lieutenant general	Ground Forces	2002
Colonel general	Ground Forces	22 February 2005
General of the army	Ground Forces	20 February 2013

== Honours ==
Russia

- Hero of the Russian Federation (2016)
- Order of St. George
  - Third Class (2017)
  - Fourth Class (2015)
- Order "For Merit to the Fatherland"
  - First Class (2021)
  - Third Class with Swords (2014)
  - Fourth Class with Swords (2002)
- Order of Alexander Nevsky (2020)
- Order of Courage (2025)
- Order of Honour (2012)
- Order of Military Merit (2000)
- Third Class of the Order "For Service to the Homeland in the Armed Forces of the USSR"
- Medal "For Battle Merit"
- Jubilee Medal "60 Years of the Armed Forces of the USSR"
- Jubilee Medal "70 Years of the Armed Forces of the USSR"
- Medal "For Courage" 1st Class
- Medal "For strengthening of brotherhood in arms"
- Medal For "200 years to the Ministry of Defence"
- Medal For "20 Years of Impeccable Service"
- Medal For "15 Years of Impeccable Service"
- Medal For "10 Years of Impeccable Service"
- Honoured Military Specialist of the Russian Federation (2009)

House of Romanov

- Grand Cordon of the Order of Saint Nicholas the Wonderworker (2022)

Armenia

- Medal of Marshal Baghramyan (2015)

Azerbaijan

- Medal "For services in the field of military cooperation" (2014)
- Order of the Friendship of Peoples (2010)

Donetsk People's Republic

- Hero of the Donetsk People's Republic (2022)

Mongolia

- Order of the Red Banner (2021)

Myanmar

- Grand Officer of the Order of the Union of Burma

Nicaragua

- Grand Officer of the Order of Ruben Dario (2013)

Syria

- Military Commonwealth Medal (2016)

== Personal life ==
Gerasimov is married and has a son and a daughter. His son also became a military officer.

=== Sanctions ===
Gerasimov was sanctioned by the British government in 2014. In April 2014, Gerasimov was added to the list of persons against whom the European Union introduced sanctions "in respect of actions undermining or threatening the territorial integrity, sovereignty and independence of Ukraine". In May 2014, Canada, Liechtenstein, and Switzerland added Gerasimov to their sanctions listed because of Russian interference in Ukraine and his responsibility for the massive Russian troop deployment next to the Russia–Ukraine border and his inability to reduce the tensions with Ukraine which are associated with these Russian troop deployments. In September 2014, Australia placed Gerasimov on their Ukraine related sanctions list.

On 25 February 2022, the United States added Gerasimov to the Specially Designated Nationals and Blocked Persons List.

== See also ==
- List of Heroes of the Russian Federation

== Sources ==
- Blanc, Alexis A.; Demus, Alyssa; Evans, Sandra Kay; Grisé, Michelle; Hvizda, Mark; Kepe, Marta; Lander, Natasha; Marcinek, Krystyna (2023). "The Russian General Staff: Understanding the Military's Decisionmaking Role in a "Besieged Fortress"" (PDF). RAND Corporation.
- Donnelly, Ted; Ryan, Kevin; Butler, Tom; Hartman, Jeff; Gabel, Lee (March 2025). "How Russia Fights: A Compendium of Troika Observations on Russia's Special Military Operation" (PDF). United States Army Europe and Africa.

Military offices
Preceded by Vladimir Shamanov	Commander of the 58th Combined Arms Army; 2001–2003	Succeeded by Viktor Sobolev
Preceded by Igor Puzanov	Commander of the Leningrad Military District; 2007–2009	Succeeded by Nikolai Bogdanovsky
Preceded by Vladimir Bakin	Commander of the Moscow Military District; 2009–2010	Succeeded by Sergey Kuzovlev
Office established	Deputy Chief of the General Staff of the Armed Forces; 2010–2012; With: Oleg Salyukov	Succeeded by Aleksandr Postnikov
Preceded by Vladimir Chirkin	Commander of the Central Military District; 2012	Succeeded by Aleksandr Dvornikov
Preceded by Nikolai Makarov	Chief of the General Staff of the Armed Forces; 2012–present	Incumbent
Preceded by Sergey Surovikin	Commander of the Joint Group of Forces in the Special Military Operation; 2023–present	Incumbent
