= Medal "For Bravery" =

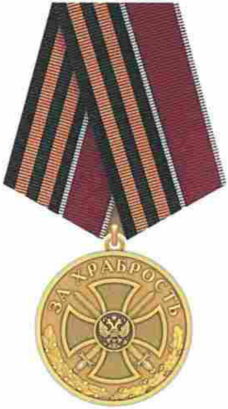
- Obverse of the Medal "For Bravery"
- Type: Honorary title
- Presented by: Russia (2020–present)
- Eligibility: Citizens of Russia
- Status: Being awarded
- Established: 9 August 2021

Precedence
- Next (higher): Medal "For Courage"
- Next (lower): Medal of Suvorov

The Medal "For Bravery" (Russian: Медаль «За храбрость») is a state award of the Russian Federation. Established by Decree of the President of the Russian Federation issued on March 23, 2023, No. 185 “On some issues of improving the state award system of the Russian Federation”.

== Criteria and regulation ==
The medal is awarded to citizens of the Russian Federation “for bravery and courage shown during combat and other operations to protect the Fatherland and state interests of the Russian Federation, as well as to maintain or restore international peace and security”. It is envisaged that the medal will be awarded to foreign citizens and stateless persons. Posthumous awarding of the medal is permitted.

The medal "For Bravery" has two degrees, the highest degree of the medal is I degree. The medal is awarded sequentially, from lowest to highest degree.

The medal is worn on the left side of the chest and is located after the Medal "For Courage". Those awarded medals of the 1st and 2nd degrees wear them in sequential order. For special occasions and possible everyday wear, a miniature copy of the medal “For Bravery” is worn, which is located after the miniature copy of the medal Medal "For Courage".

When wearing a ribbon of the "Medal For Bravery" on uniform, it is located on the bar after the ribbon of the medal “For Courage”.
