= Kazan Higher Tank Command School =

Military training establishment in Kazan, Tatarstan, Russia

Coordinates: 55.755°N 49.153°E

- Казанское высшее танковое командное училище
- Type: Higher military school
- Established: 1941
- Rector: Major general Vitaly Gerasimov
- Location: 420059, Orenburg tract, 6, Kazan, (Russia)
- Campus: Urban
- Website: https://kvtkku.mil.ru/

Kazan Higher Tank Command School (Russian: Казанское высшее танковое командное училище, romanized: Kazanskoye vyssheye tankovoye komandnoye uchilishche) is a Russian higher military school conducting commissioned officer programmes (specialitet). It is located in Kazan.

== History ==
The Kazan Tank School was founded in 1941 on the base of the former Kazan Infantry School. It was renamed the Kazan Higher Tank Command School in 1965.

In November 2022, several videos and photos of new T-14 Armata main battle tanks appeared on social media, apparently training at the same grounds as Russian military personnel who were mobilized. The videos were located to a training ground in Kazan, where the cadets of the Kazan Higher Tank Command School train.

== Educational programmes ==
The School prepares officers for the tank troops of the Ground Forces.

== Alumni ==
- Vladislav Achalov
- Valery Baranov
- Valery Gerasimov
- Fanil Sarvarov
- Gennady Troshev
