= Russian anti-corruption campaign =

Russian government initiative

The Russian anti-corruption campaign is an ongoing effort by the Russian government to curb corruption, which has been recognized as one of Russia's most serious problems. Central documents in the campaign include the National Anti-Corruption Plan, introduced by President Dmitry Medvedev in 2009, and the National Anti-Corruption Strategy, introduced in 2010. The central organization in the campaign is the Anti-Corruption Council, established in 2008. Medvedev has made fighting corruption one of the top agendas of his presidency. According to Transparency International, Russia's position in the Corruption Perception Index has improved thanks to the anti-corruption campaign.

== Background ==
Fighting corruption was one of the key areas of Dmitry Medvedev's presidency. On 19 May 2008, Medvedev signed a decree on anti-corruption measures, which included creation of an Anti-Corruption Council. In the first meeting of the council on 30 September 2008, Medvedev said:

"I will repeat one simple, but very painful thing. Corruption in our country has become rampant. It has become commonplace and characterises the life of the Russian society."

== Measures ==
=== Anti-Corruption plan ===
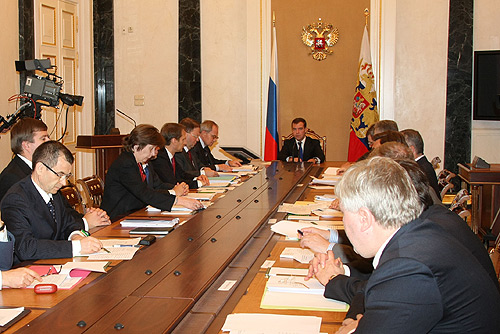
Medvedev chairing a meeting the Anti-Corruption Council on 30 September 2008

In July 2008, Medvedev's National Anti-Corruption Plan was published in the official Rossiyskaya Gazeta newspaper. It suggested measures aimed at making sanctions for corruption more severe, such as legislature to disqualify state and municipal officials who commit minor corruption offences and making it obligatory for officials to report corruption. The plan ordered the government to prepare anti-corruption legislation based on these suggestions. The bill that followed, called On Corruption Counteraction, was signed into law on 25 December 2008 as Federal Law N 273-FZ. According to Professor Richard Sakwa, "Russia now at last had serious, if flawed, legislation against corruption, which in the context was quite an achievement, although preliminary results were meagre."

=== Anti-corruption strategy ===
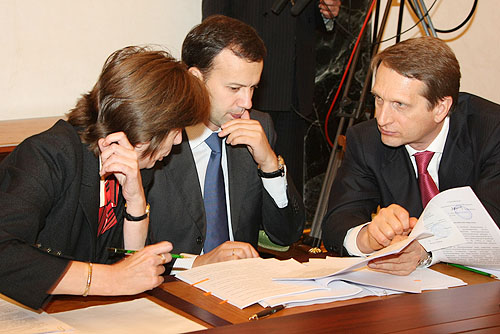
Arkady Dvorkovich, Sergey Naryshkin and Larisa Brychyova planning the government's anti-corruption efforts at a meeting of the Anti-Corruption Council

On 13 April 2010, Medvedev signed presidential decree No. 460 which introduced the National Anti-Corruption Strategy, a midterm government policy, while the plan is updated every two years. The new strategy calls corruption "a systemic threat" to the country and emphasises the need to get the public involved in fighting corruption. The strategy stipulates increases in fines for corruption, greater public oversight of government budgets and sociological research. The head of presidential administration Sergey Naryshkin gave Medvedev annual updates on progress regarding the strategy. According to Georgy Satarov, president of the Indem think tank, the introduction of the new strategy "probably reflected Medvedev's frustration with the fact that the 2008 plan had yielded little result."

=== Further measures ===
In January 2011, President Medvedev admitted that the government had so far failed in its anti-corruption measures.

On 4 May 2011, Medvedev continued his anti-corruption efforts by signing the Federal Law On Amendments to the Criminal Code and the Code of Administrative Offences of the Russian Federation to Improve State Anti-Corruption Management. The bill raised fines for corruption to up to 100 times the amount of the bribe given or received, with the maximum fine being 500 million rubles ($18.3 million).

== Implications ==
Russia's score in Corruption Perceptions Index rose from 2.1 in 2008 to 2.2 in 2009, which "could be interpreted as a mildly positive response to the newly-adopted package of anti-corruption legislation initiated and promoted by president Medvedev and passed by the Duma in December of 2008", according to Transparency International's CPI 2009 Regional Highlights report.

In 2011, Russia's position in the Corruption Perception Index improved by 11 places. According to Transparency International, the improvement was a result of the successful implementation of President Medvedev's anti-corruption campaign. The organisation especially highlighted implementation of anti-bribery legislation and signing the Organization for Economic Cooperation and Development's anti-bribery convention as anti-corruption measures that appear to be working.

== See also ==
- Combating Corruption
- List of people convicted of bribery in Russia
