= Vostok 2022 =

Russian military exercise

Vostok 2022 (Russian: Восток 2022, lit. 'East 2022') was a large-scale Russian military exercise held in the Russian Eastern Military District (encompassing Siberia and the country's Far East, including the Sea of Japan and the Sea of Okhotsk) from September 1 to September 7, 2022.

It was supervised by the Chief of the General Staff of the Russian Federation general Valery Gerasimov. A total of 13 countries took part in the exercise, which, in addition to Russia, included China, India, Belarus, Armenia, Algeria, Azerbaijan, Kazakhstan, Kyrgyzstan, Syria, Nicaragua, Laos, Mongolia and Tajikistan. The Chinese contingent was the second largest after the Russian one, and the most comprehensive contingent China ever sent to Russian exercises (it was the first time all three branches of Chinese military - the infantry, navy and air force -participated in a training activity in Russia). It was composed of approximately 2,000 soldiers, 300 vehicles, 21 planes and 3 ships from the Northern Theater Command. The Indian contingent was made up of elements of 7th and 8th Gorkha Rifles, estimated to be about 75 soldiers strong.

The Russian minister of defence Sergei Shoigu claimed that the exercise would involve over 300,000 soldiers which would make it Russia's biggest military exercise to date, but that estimate was said to be inflated. According to the Ministry of Defense of the Russian Federation, over 50,000 military personnel, more than 5,000 units of weapons and military equipment, including 140 aircraft, 60 warships, boats and support vessels were supposed to participate in the exercise. The exercise was smaller than the previous Vostok 2018.

Russian President Vladimir Putin observed the exercise.

Chinese participation in the drills have been said to reflect improved China–Russia relations, and a message to the West that Russia still has international military allies, despite its recent invasion of Ukraine. On the other hand, the drills have been said to worsen Japan-Russia relations as they included a naval exercise near the disputed islands of South Kuril, claimed by both Russia and Japan. India chose not to send its maritime units to the Vostok-2022 as it did not wish to jeopardize its relation with Japan.

Russian tactics displayed in the exercise have been criticized as obsolete.
