= Fanil Sarvarov =

Russian general (1969–2025)

- Фанил Фанисович Сарваров
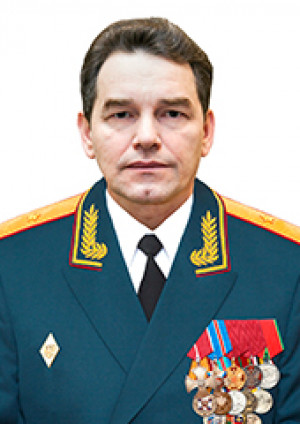
- Born: Fanil Fanisovich Sarvarov; 11 March 1969; Gremyachinsk, Russian SFSR, Soviet Union
- Died: 22 December 2025 (aged 56); Moscow, Russia
- Cause of death: Assassination
- Military career
- Allegiance: Russia
- Branch: Russian Ground Forces
- Service years: 1990–2025
- Rank: Lieutenant general
- Commands: Operational Training Directorate
- Conflicts: Chechen–Russian conflict; First Chechen War; Second Chechen War; East Prigorodny conflict; Syrian civil war; Russo-Ukrainian war; Russo-Ukrainian war (2022–present)
- Awards: Order of Courage; Medal of the Order "For Merit to the Fatherland"; Order of Military Merit; Medal of Suvorov

Fanil Fanisovich Sarvarov (Russian: Фанил Фанисович Сарваров; 11 March 1969 – 22 December 2025) was a Russian lieutenant general who served as chief of the Operational Training Directorate of the General Staff of the Russian Armed Forces. Sarvarov was part of combat operations in the East Prigorodny conflict and of the Second Chechen War in the late 1990s and early 2000s. He led the Russian operations in the Syrian civil war between 2015 and 2016.

Sarvarov was killed by a car bomb on Yasenevaya Street in Moscow on 22 December 2025.

== Early life and education ==
Sarvarov was born in Gremyachinsk, Perm Oblast, Russia, on 11 March 1969. An ethnic Tatar, he graduated from the Kazan Higher Tank Command Red Banner School in 1990. He later graduated from the Malinovsky Military Armored Forces Academy in 1999, and from the Military Academy of the General Staff in 2008.

== Military career ==
Sarvarov began his career as a military officer in the Russian Armed Forces. He fought in the East Prigorodny conflict and the Chechen wars from 1992 to 2003. From 2015 to 2016, he helped command Russia's intervention in the Syrian civil war. He became the chief of the General Staff's Operational Training Directorate in 2016, a role he held until his death in 2025. He took part in the Russo-Ukrainian war, overseeing the Russian military's combat readiness and training in Ukraine, and was promoted to lieutenant general on 2 May 2024 under presidential decree.

He was a recipient of several military awards, including the Order of Courage, the Medal of the Order "For Merit to the Fatherland" 1st and 2nd classes, the Order of Military Merit, and the Medal of Suvorov.

== Death ==
Sarvarov was killed in a car bombing on 22 December 2025 at the age of 56. At 6:55 am local time, a bomb placed under his Kia Sorento car exploded while he was driving out of a parking lot on Yaseneva Street, southern Moscow. The explosion damaged seven nearby cars. Sarvarov was injured in the explosion, receiving "multiple shrapnel injuries, closed fractures, leg injuries, and a fractured facial bone". He later died in the hospital.

The Russian Investigative Committee announced that it was investigating whether Ukrainian intelligence agencies were involved in the killing. It was also investigating illegal explosives trafficking that facilitated the bombing.

== See also ==
- List of Russian generals killed during the Russo-Ukrainian war (2022–present)
