= Yuriy Sadovenko =

Russian military officer (1969–2025)

Colonel General Yury Sadovenko
- Юрий Садовенко
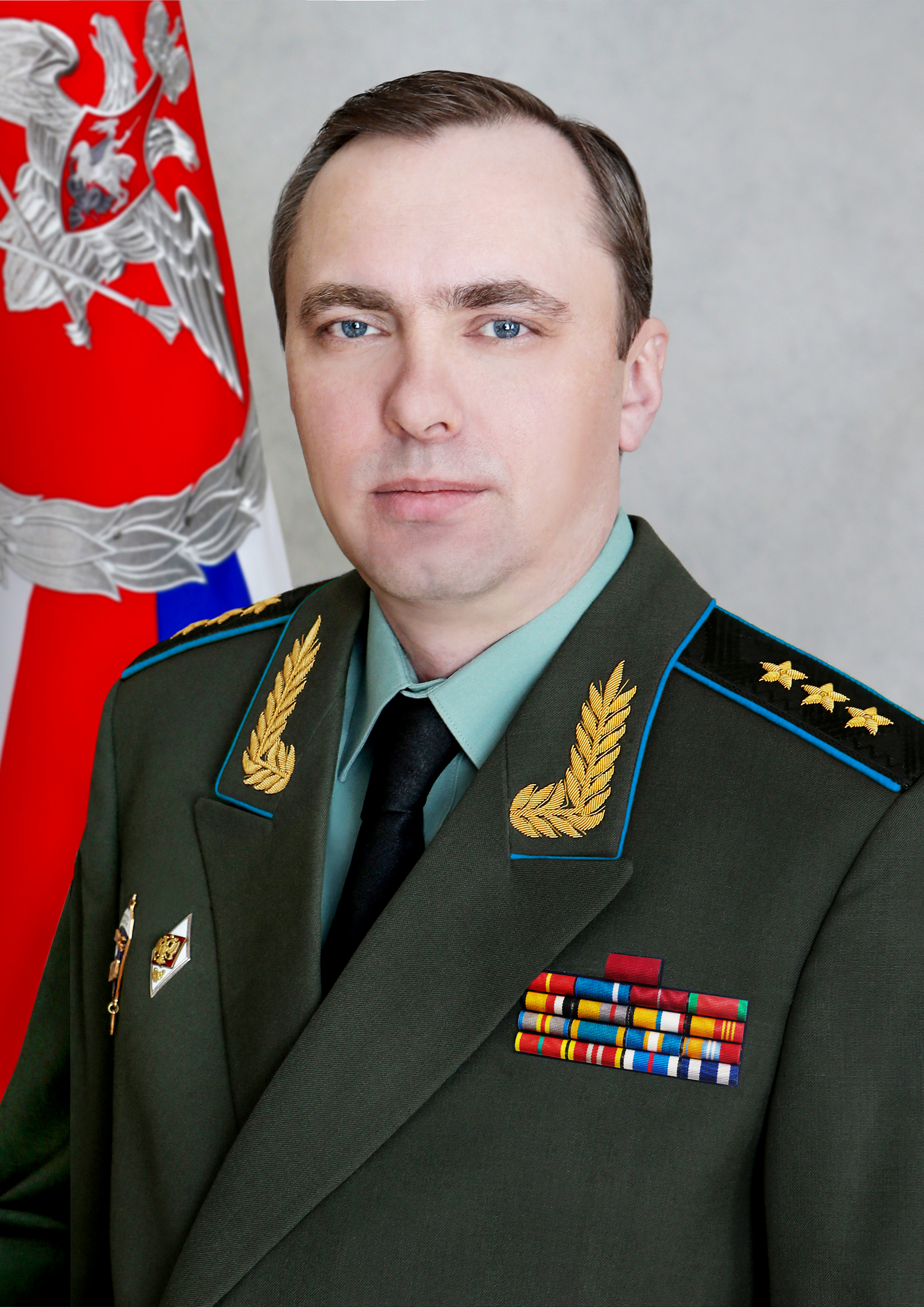
- Official portrait, 2014
- Born: 11 September 1969; Zhytomyr, Ukrainian SSR, Soviet Union
- Died: 25 December 2025 (aged 56)
- Military career
- Allegiance: Soviet Union; Russia
- Branch: Armed Forces of the Russian Federation
- Service years: 1985–2012; 2013–2024
- Rank: Colonel General
- Awards: Order of Military Merit; Order of Honour; Medal of the Order "For Merit to the Fatherland" (2nd grade); Medal of Suvorov

Yury Eduardovich Sadovenko (Russian: Юрий Эдуардович Садовенко; 11 September 1969 – 25 December 2025) was a Russian army officer who served as the Deputy Minister of Defence from 2013 to 2024. He was a recipient of Order of Military Merit and Medal of Suvorov.

== Biography ==
Sadovenko was born on 11 September 1969, in Zhytomyr, Ukrainian Soviet Socialist Republic. He graduated from Ryazan Higher Airborne Command School in 1990 and the same year began serving in the Russian Armed Forces where he was a participant in combat operations. Four years later he served at the Ministry of Emergency Situations where he used to rescue and provide humanitarian aid until 2002, and from that year until 2007.

From 2002 to 2007, he was an Assistant to the Minister in the same place. In 2007, he became Head of the Office there, and from May to November 2012 became the Head of the Executive Office of the Moscow Oblast. On 9 January 2013, Sadovenko was appointed a Head of the Office by Presidential Decree.

Sadovenko was dismissed on 20 May 2024. He died on 25 December 2025, at the age of 56.

== Sanctions ==
Sadovenko was included under US sanctions in July 2022.

He was sanctioned by the UK government in 2022 in relation to the Russo-Ukrainian War.
