= Vladislav Achalov =

Soviet general

Vladislav Alekseyevich Achalov
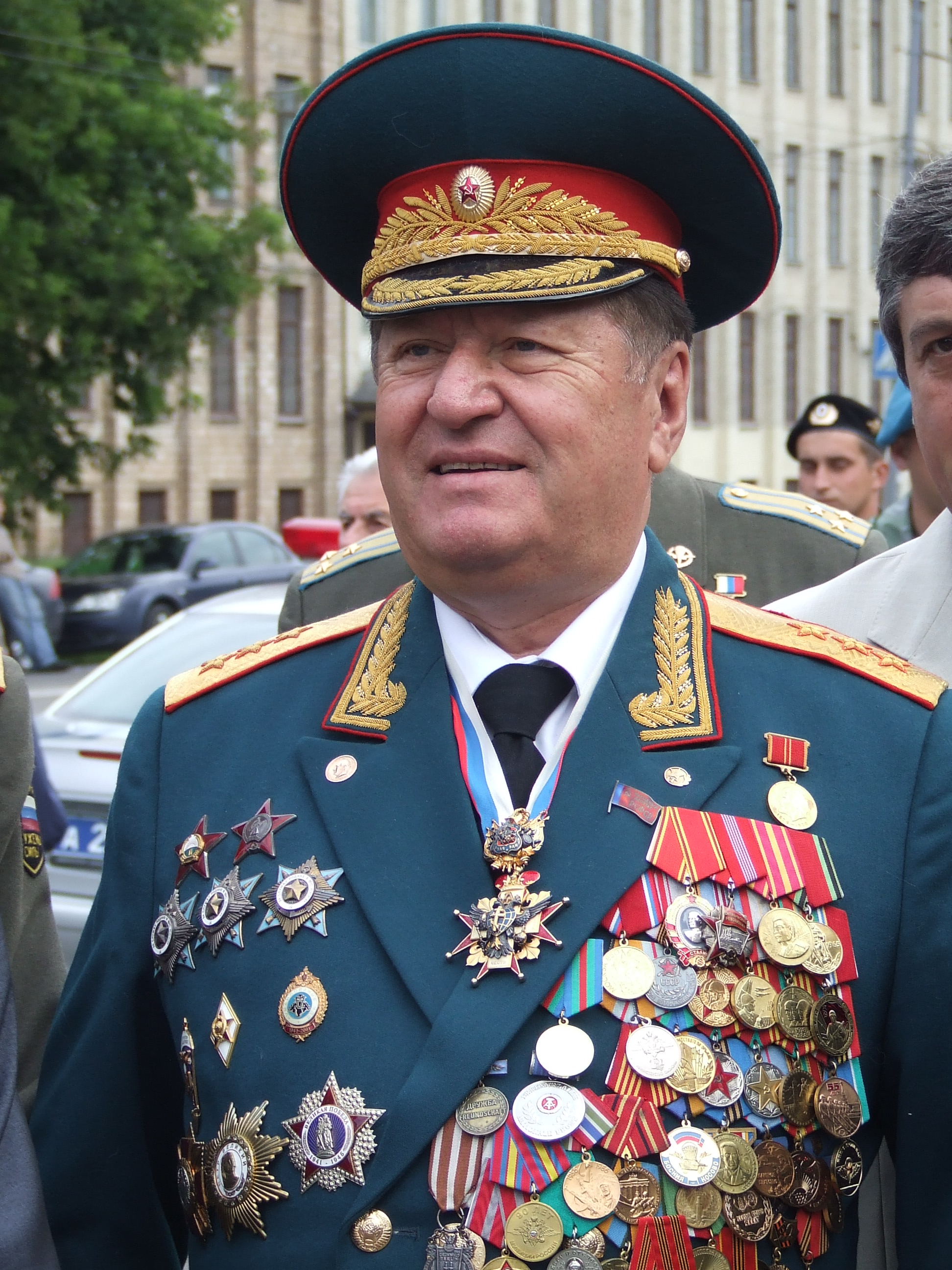
- Achalov in 2008
- Born: 19 November 1945; Arsky District, Tatar ASSR, Soviet Union
- Died: 23 June 2011 (aged 65) Moscow, Russia
- Allegiance: Soviet Union (1962–1991)
- Branch: Soviet Army, Soviet Airborne Forces
- Service years: 1966–1991
- Rank: Colonel General
- Commands: Soviet Airborne Forces
- Awards: Order for Service to the Homeland in the Armed Forces of the USSR - 1st, 2nd and 3rd class

Vladislav Alekseyevich Achalov (Russian: Владисла́в Алексе́евич Ача́лов; 19 November 1945 – 23 June 2011) was a Soviet general, politician and public figure. Achalov served as the 12th commander of the Soviet Airborne Forces and the deputy minister of defence (1990–1991).

== Biography ==
=== Early life and military career ===
Achalov was born on November 13, 1945, in the village of Atamash, Atninsky District, in the Tatar Autonomous Soviet Socialist Republic. Upon deciding to join the army, he attended the Kazan Tank School of the Red Army, from which he graduated in 1966. He started his career in the army as a commander of a platoon of tanks, and later he became the commander of a company of tanks. In 1973 he graduated from the Academy of Armoured Forces but transferred to the Airborne Forces in 1974, becoming commander of an artillery regiment. In 1975–77 he was a commander of an airborne regiment and later (1977–78) vice-commander of 98th Guards Airborne Division. From 1978 to 1982 he was commander of the 7th Guards Airborne Division.

In February 1981 he visited Warsaw and in September he participated in "Zapad-81" training exercise. After graduating from the Voroshilov General Staff Academy in 1984, he became the deputy commander of the 2nd Guards Tank Army and 1985 commander of the 8th Guards Army within the Group of Soviet Forces in Germany. In 1987–89 he was working in Leningrad as Chief of Staff, First Deputy Commander of the Leningrad Military District. From January 1989 to December 1990 he was commander of the Soviet Airborne Forces.

=== Political career and death ===
In December 1990, unexpectedly, "with no preliminary discussion, none of the usual procedures such as interviews with the Central Committee or the Poltburo," he was made a deputy minister of defence. This lasted until August 1991. After the August 1991 coup he was sent to a sanatorium, "the usual preliminary to enforced retirement." He was a member of Supreme Council of Russian Soviet Republic in 1990–1993.

A supporter of the failed coup attempts of 1991 and 1993, in his later years he led a union of veteran paratroopers and organised a large protest against Yeltsin's policies. Achalov died at a Moscow hospital on 23 June 2011, aged 65.

== Family ==
He was married in 1974 to Larisa Pavlovna Gudzi, and had a son and daughter.
