= Timur Ivanov =

Russian politician (born 1975)

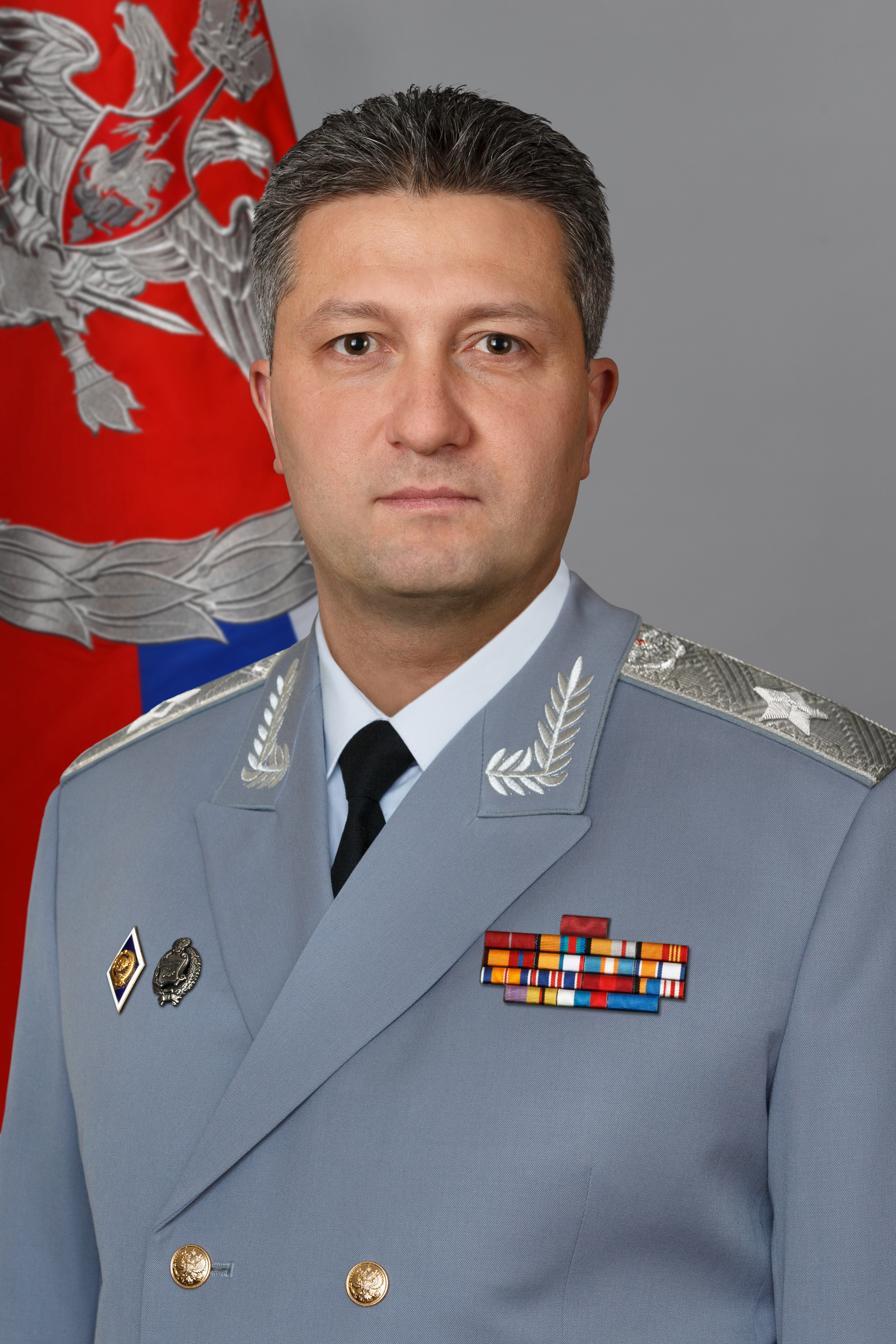
- Official portrait, 2016

Deputy Minister of Defense Russia
- In office 11 November 2016 – 24 April 2024
- Minister: Sergei Shoigu
- Preceded by: Aleksey Dyumin

Deputy prime minister of Moscow Oblast
- In office 5 November 2012 – 23 May 2016
- Governor: Sergei Shoigu; Alexey Vorobyov
- Preceded by: Aleksey Dyumin

Personal details
- Born: 15 August 1975 (age 50) Moscow, Soviet Union
- Spouse: Svetlana Zakharova
- Education: MSU Faculty of Computational Mathematics and Cybernetics

Timur Vadimovich Ivanov (Russian: Тимур Вадимович Иванов; born 15 August 1975) is a Russian politician who served as Deputy Defence Minister of Russia from 2016 to 2024.

He previously served as the Deputy Governor of the Moscow Oblast from 2012 to 2016. He has the federal state civilian service rank of 1st class Active State Councillor of the Russian Federation.

In April 2024, Ivanov was arrested by Russian federal authorities, accused of accepting bribes "on a particularly large scale" and sentenced to 13 years' imprisonment by the Moscow City Court for embezzlement in July 2025.

== Early life and education ==
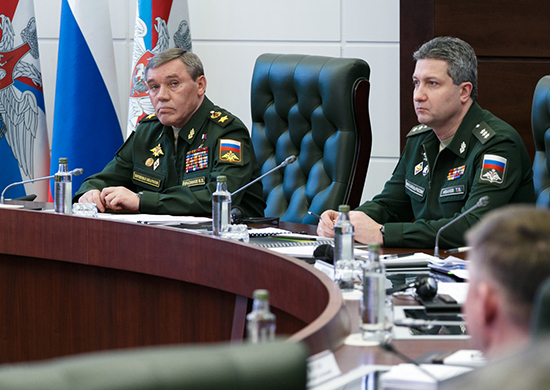
Timur Ivanov and Valery Gerasimov, 26 February 2018

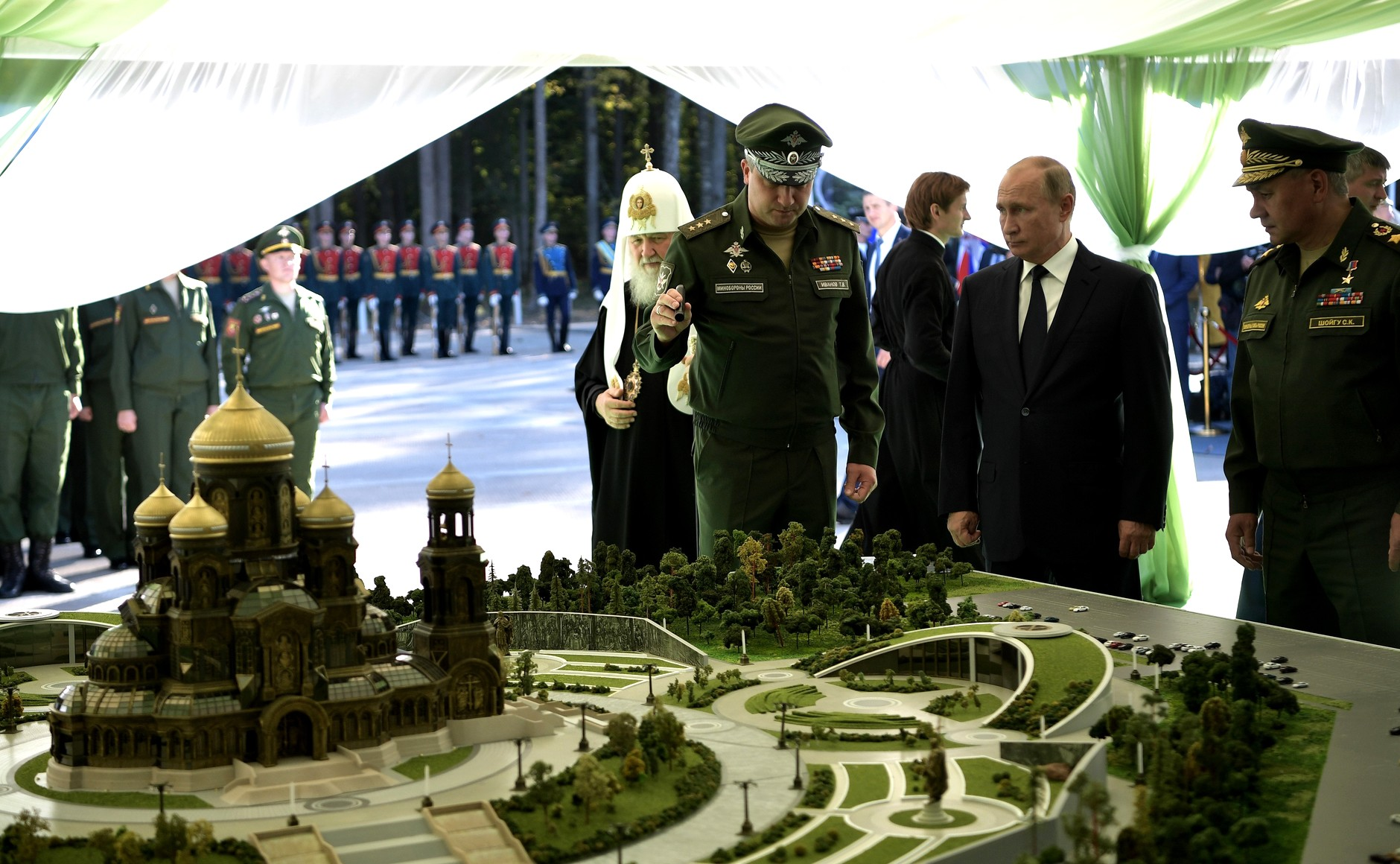
Ivanov, Russian President Vladimir Putin, Russian Defense Minister Sergei Shoigu and Patriarch Kirill at Patriot Park in Kubinka, 19 September 2018

Timur Ivanov was born on 15 August 1975 in Moscow. His father, Vadim Gennadyevich, is the general director of Crystal Development LLC since 2004, while his mother is of Lezgian descent, as she is originally from the Kurakhsky district of Dagestan.

In 1997, Ivanov graduated from the Faculty of Computational Mathematics and Cybernetics of Moscow State University. M.V. Lomonosov.

Ivanov holds a candidate of economic sciences degree for his dissertation "Financial and organizational models of NPP construction projects" under the direction of Aleksandr Karyakin was defended in Ivanovo in 2011.

== Career ==
From 1997 to 1999, Ivanov worked in various commercial organizations. From 1999 to 2012, he worked at enterprises of the fuel and energy complex of Russia.

=== Civil service (2012–2016) ===
From 2012 to 2016, he served as Deputy Governor of the Moscow Oblast, under governor Sergei Shoigu. From 2013 to 2016, he was the General Director of Oboronstroy JSC, a subordinate to the Russian Ministry of Defense.

=== Deputy Minister of Defence (2016–2024) ===
On 23 May 2016, Ivanov was appointed Deputy Minister of Defense of Russia, ending his tenure as Deputy Governor. He officially took office on 11 November by presidential decree, replacing Aleksey Dyumin. In the Ministry of Defense, he oversees issues related to property management and quartering of troops, housing, and medical support of the Armed Forces of the Russian Federation, and is responsible for the construction, reconstruction, and overhaul of facilities of the Russian Ministry of Defense and military mortgages.

During the COVID-19 pandemic in Russia in 2020, he supervised the construction of 16 multifunctional medical centers of the Ministry of Defense for the treatment of patients with COVID-19.

On 27 December 2021, following Yevgeny Zinichev's death, there were rumors that Ivanov would be the next official Minister of Emergency Situations.

On 23 April 2023, several dozen activists gathered at a rally, organized by opposition leader Alexei Navalny's team. Anti-Kremlin activists urged the EU to impose sanctions on his ex-wife Svetlana.

On 23 April 2024, the Russian government arrested Ivanov, charging him with accepting bribes. On 24 April, he was dismissed as deputy minister of defence by the order of Sergey Shoigu. According to other Russian sources, he was also been charged with "high treason". He has been linked to Oboronlogistics and the small fleet of vessels which transport material such as missiles and tanks for the AFRF.

In July 2024 Magomed Khandayev, who was subordinate to Ivanov in the ministry and had been implicated and arrested in the corruption scandal there, died suddenly and unexpectedly while in custody.

On 1 July 2025, Ivanov was convicted and sentenced to 13 years' imprisonment by the Moscow City Court for embezzlement.

== Family ==
Ivanov had married his second wife, Svetlana Aleksandrovna Maniovich (née Zakharova), born in Moscow on 19 September 1973. Svetlana is an entrepreneur and owns the Metropol Fashion Group. She is a former host of the program "Take it off immediately!" on STS. She is an Israeli citizen.

Her children from her first marriage with Mikhail Maniovich are daughter Aleksandra (born 1998) and son Mikhail (born 2003). The Anti-Corruption Foundation turned to the Italian Guardia di Finanza with a request to arrest the assets of Ivanov and members of his family. Svetlana Maniovich did not fall under EU sanctions, as she formally divorced, but continued to spend in Europe the money that her husband earned in the war in Ukraine. According to the investigation of the Navalny team, Ivanov and his wife Svetlana spent over a million euros on holidays, renting villas and yachts, as well as the purchase of jewelry and clothes, while Svetlana's personal accounts were paid by a company engaged by the Russian Ministry of Defence in the reconstruction of Mariupol.

The couple have two daughters, Darya (born in 2010), and Praskovya (born in 2018).

In 2018, Forbes Russia estimated Ivanov and his family's net worth at 136.7 million rubles ($1.5 million).

In June 2022, he divorced his spouse, Svetlana. Before the divorce, she changed her surname from Maniovich to Ivanova.

== Awards ==
In 2022, Ivanov was awarded the title Hero of the Luhansk People's Republic.

== Sanctions ==
In October 2022, the European Union introduced sanctions against Ivanov. According to the European Parliament, Ivanov is responsible for the Russian invasion of Ukraine.
