= On Counteracting Corruption =

"On Counteracting Corruption" is a Federal law of the Russian Federation that took effect on January 10, 2009. It established the legal and organizational frameworks for preventing and fighting corruption. The law also established criminal liability for acts of corruption, introduced fines on companies engaged in corrupt activities, and required the dismissal of public officials for violations of the legislation.

Corruption was defined by the legislation as a detriment to the lawful interests of the state and society arising from: an abuse of power or position of authority by public officials and corporate officers, giving or receiving a bribe to/from a foreign public official, engaging in commercial bribery, or facilitating a bribe.

The law requires civil servants to inform their employer, the prosecutor's office or other state bodies of all bribe attempts. In addition, civil servants are obliged to declare their income and wealth (the list of declared income and assets) and the income and property of the spouse and minor children. In order to prevent conflicts of interest, civil servants holding securities or shares (including participation interests) need to transfer them to trust management.

== See also ==
- Russian anti-corruption campaign
