= Yuri Sleptsov =

Mayor of Voskresensk (2003–2012), Moscow Oblast, Russia

Yuri Sleptsov (Russian: Слепцов, Юрий Фёдорович; October 8, 1960 – January 4 2025), Russian politician, former mayor of Voskresensk, Moscow Oblast, Russia.

He graduated from the Leningrad Suvorov Military School in 1977 and Kolomna Higher Artillery Command School. During 1984–1986 he took part in the Soviet–Afghan War.

In 2003 he was elected mayor of Voskresensk, Moscow Oblast

In 2012 he was convicted of bribery and sentenced for 18.1 million rouble fine for facilitating land leases in the city.

In February 2023 Sleptsov joined the Russian invasion of Ukraine.

== Awards ==
Sleptsov is a recipient of a number state and regional awards, including Order of the Red Banner ad Order of the Red Star.
