= Vadim Shamarin =

Russian military officer

- Вадим Анатольевич Шамарин
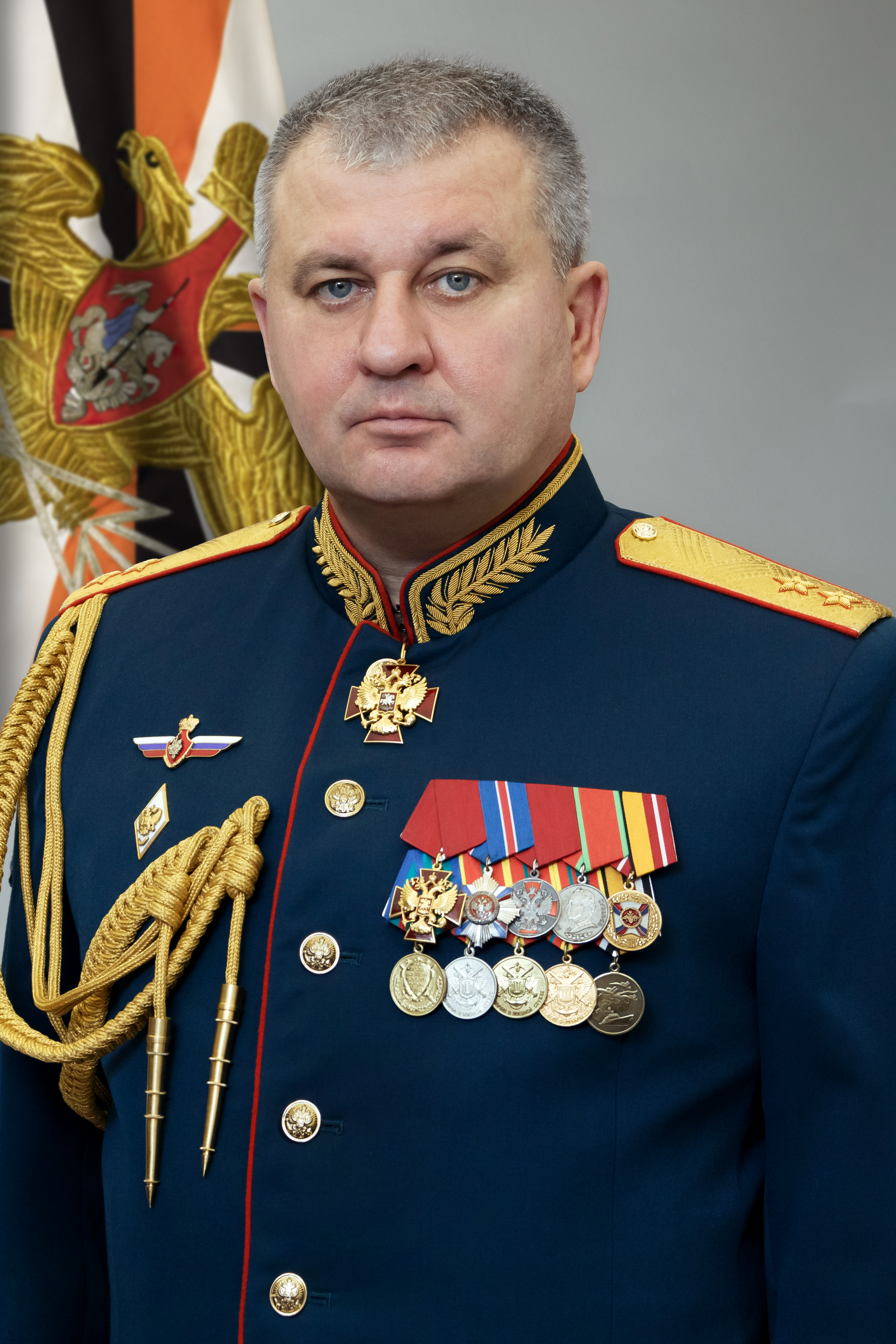
- Official portrait, 2023
- Born: June 10, 1971 (age 55); Taganrog, RSFSR
- Alma mater: Military Academy of Signal Corps
- Military career
- Allegiance: Russia
- Branch: Russian Armed Forces
- Service years: 1987–2025
- Rank: Lieutenant general
- Commands: Russian Signal Troops
- Awards: Order "For Merit to the Fatherland"; Order of Military Merit; Medal of the Order "For Merit to the Fatherland"; Medal of Suvorov

Vadim Anatolyevich Shamarin (Russian: Вадим Анатольевич Шамарин; born 10 June 1971 in Taganrog, RSFSR) is a former Russian military officer who served as head of the Main Communications Directorate of the Russian Armed Forces and deputy chief of the Russian General Staff until he was court martialed and convicted of bribery.

== Biography ==
He graduated from the Novocherkassk Higher Military Command School of Communications and the Military Academy of Communications

In 1992, he was the commander of the radio center's remote control platoon, and then rose to become the head of the communications center of the communications brigade.

In the early 2000s, he became commander of the communications brigade of the Eastern Military District.

In 2010, Shamarin became the head of communications of the Eastern Military District.

In 2020, he was appointed to the position of acting head of the Main Directorate of the Russian Armed Forces for Communications and Deputy Chief of the General Staff.

In 2021, the prefix "acting" was dropped with the corresponding presidential decree was signed by President Vladimir Putin. Shamarin served in this position until 2024. On May 23, 2024, Shamarin was detained by the Main Military Investigation Department of the Investigative Committee of Russia and later arrested by the court for two months as a suspect in committing a crime under Part 6 of Art. 290 of the Criminal Code of Russia ("Receiving a bribe on an especially large scale by an official"). Shamarin is suspected of receiving bribes (the so-called "kickback") totaling 36 million rubles from Alexey Vysokov, General Director of the Perm Telephone Plant Telta OJSC, and Elena Grishina, the chief accountant of the same company, who were arrested in 2023. In particular, according to the investigation, Shamarin assisted Vysokov and Grishina in obtaining government contracts with the Russian Ministry of Defense for a total amount of 442 million rubles

On 17 April 2025, Shamarin was convicted by a court-martial over the bribery charges and was sentenced to seven years' imprisonment.
