= Medal of Suvorov =

Russian military award

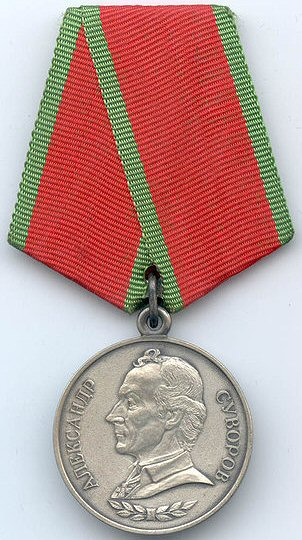
- Medal of Suvorov
- Type: State Decoration
- Awarded for: Bravery and courage displayed during ground combat
- Presented by: Russian Federation
- Eligibility: Russian Federation Soldiers
- Status: Active
- Established: March 2, 1994
- Ribbon of the Medal of Suvorov

Precedence
- Next (higher): Medal "For Bravery"
- Next (lower): Medal of Ushakov

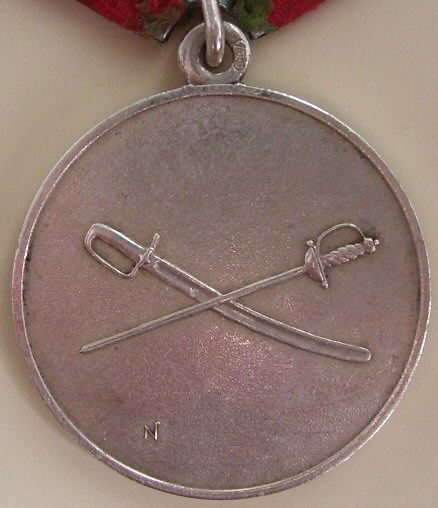
Reverse of the Medal of Suvorov

The "Medal of Suvorov" (Russian: «Медаль Суворова») is a state decoration of the Russian Federation awarded to ground troops for courage in combat. It is named in honour of Russian field marshal Count Alexander Suvorov (1729–1800).

== History ==
The Medal of Suvorov was established by Presidential Decree №442 of March 2, 1994. Its statute was modified on two occasions, by Presidential Decree №19 on January 6, 1999 and lastly by Presidential Decree № 1099 of September 7, 2010.

== Award statute ==
The Medal of Suvorov is awarded to soldiers for bravery and courage displayed during ground operations in the defence of the Fatherland and of the public interests of the Russian Federation, during the performance of combat service and combat duty, during exercises or manoeuvres, while on duty for the protection of the state borders of the Russian Federation, as well as for excellent performance in combat training and in maintaining military preparedness.

It is worn on the left breast with other medals and the order of precedence dictates it be placed immediately after the Medal for Courage.

== Award description ==
The Medal of Suvorov is a 32mm in diameter circular silver medal with raised rims on both the obverse and reverse. At the center of the obverse, the left profile of the bust of Field Marshal Alexander Suvorov. Below the bust near the bottom rim, two laurel leaves in relief. Along the left rim, the inscription in relief "ALEXANDER" (Russian: «АЛЕКСАНДР»), along the right rim, the inscription in relief "SUVOROV" (Russian «СУВОРОВ»). In the center of the reverse, a sword crossed with a sabre pointing down. Below the sword and sabre to the left, a relief "N" followed by the award serial number.

The medal is suspended to a standard Russian pentagonal mount by a ring through the medal's suspension loop. The mount is covered by an overlapping 24mm wide silk moiré red ribbon with 3mm wide green edge stripes.

== See also ==
- Awards and decorations of the Russian Federation
- Field Marshal Count Alexander Suvorov
