= Averinsky (rural locality) =

Averinsky (Russian: Аверинский; masculine), Averinskaya (Аверинская; feminine), or Averinskoye (Аверинское; neuter) is the name of several rural localities in Russia:

- Averinskaya, Vologda Oblast, rural locality (a village) in Dvinitskoye Rural Settlement, Syamzhensky District, Vologda Oblast
- Averinskaya, Yaroslavl Oblast, rural locality (a village) in Ilinskoye Rural Settlement, Uglichsky District, Yaroslavl Oblast
