= Andrey Bulyga =

Russian deputy minister of defence (born 1968)

- Андрей Михайлович Булыга
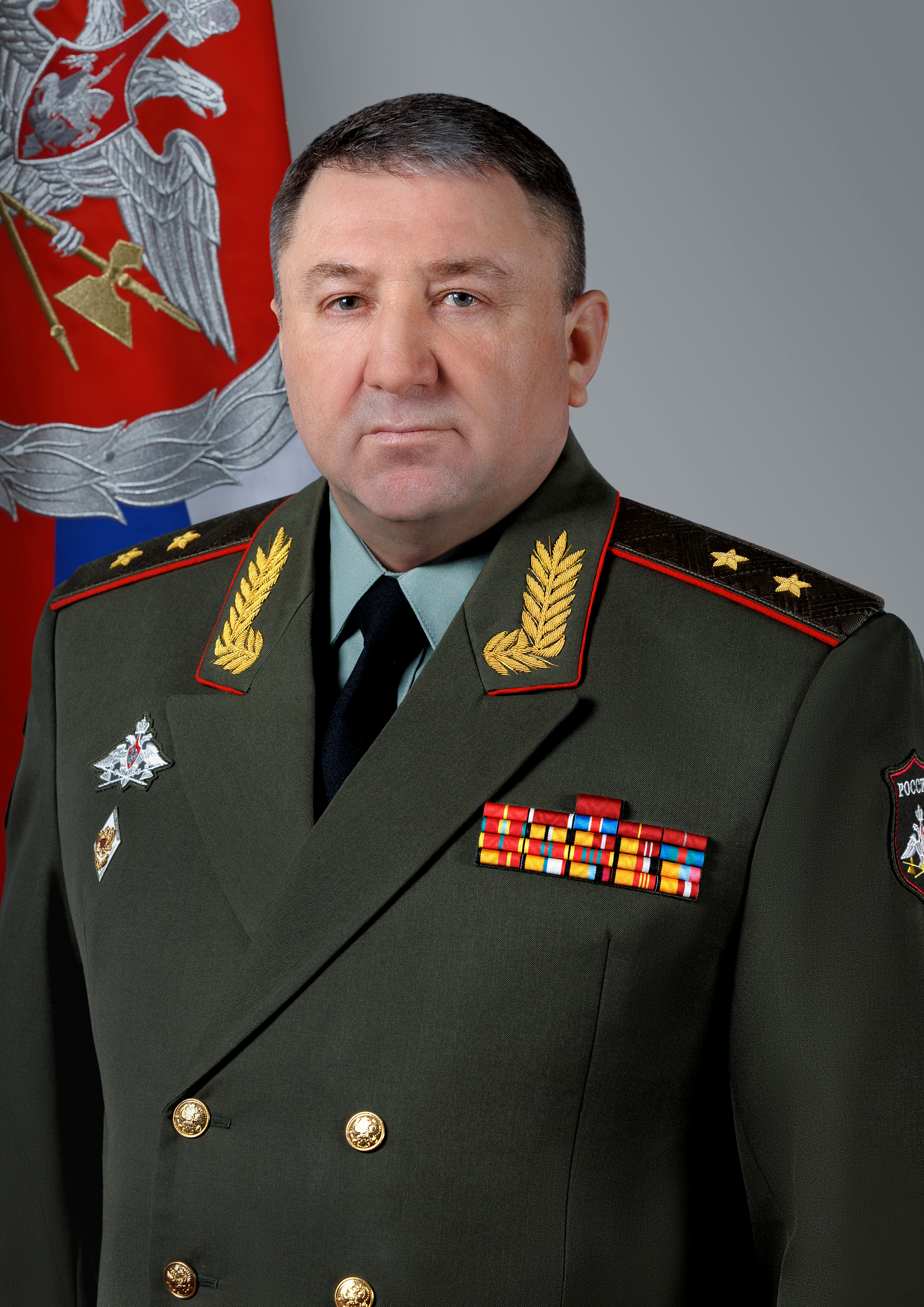
- Official portrait, 2024
- Born: March 11, 1968 (age 58); Sary-Ozek, KSSR
- Education: Military Logistics Academy; Military Academy of the Russian General Staff
- Military career
- Allegiance: Soviet Union; Russia
- Branch: Logistical Support of the Russian Armed Forces
- Service years: 1985–2025
- Rank: Colonel general
- Awards: Order "For Merit to the Fatherland", Order of Alexander Nevsky, Order of Courage, Order of Military Merit, Medal of the Order "For Merit to the Fatherland", Jubilee Medal "70 Years of the Armed Forces of the USSR", Medal "Participant of the military operation in Syria", Medal "For the Return of Crimea", Awards of the Russian Ministry of Defense

Andrey Mikhailovich Bulyga (Russian: Андрей Михайлович Булыга; born 13 October 1968, Sary-Ozek, Kazakh SSR) is a Russian Military officer who has been a deputy secretary of the Security Council of Russia since 2025. Between 11 March 2024 and 8 November 2025, he was a Deputy Minister of Defense of the Russian Federation for Logistics and director of the Logistical Support of the Russian Armed Forces. Since 2024 he holds the rank of Colonel General.

== Biography ==
Born on 13 October 1968 in the village of Sary-Ozek then part of Almaty Region in the Kazakh SSR.

In 1990, he graduated from the Ulyanovsk Higher Military Technical School, in 1999 from the Military Academy of Logistics and Transport, and in 2010 from the Military Academy of the General Staff.

He served in the Western Group of Forces, the Moscow, Far Eastern and Central Military Districts, and at the Logistics Command of the Armed Forces of the Russian Federation.

Since December 2012 he served as Deputy Commander of the Central Military District for Logistics, since February 2018 as Deputy Commander of the Western Military District for Logistics.

In 2014, he was awarded the military rank of major general. On February 20, 2016, he was awarded the military rank of lieutenant general.

On March 11, 2024, by decree of the President of Russia, he was appointed Deputy Minister of Defense of the Russian Federation for logistics of the Russian Armed Forces, replacing Alexey Kuzmenkov. In November 2025, he was relieved of this position.
