= Rear of the Russian Armed Forces =

Former support service of the Russian Armed Forces

Тыл Вооружëнных Сил Российской Федерации Rear of the Armed Forces of the Russian Federation
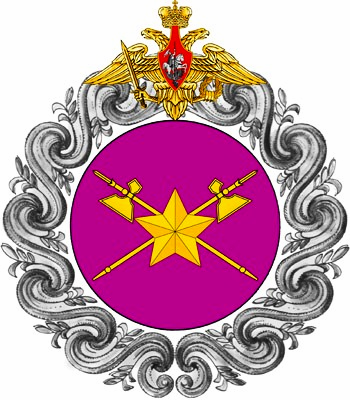
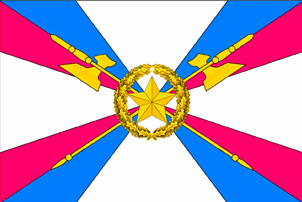
- RAFRF great emblem and flag
- Active: 1992–2010
- Country: Russian Federation
- Branch: Russian Armed Forces
- Role: Logistics and support
- Garrison/HQ: Moscow
- Anniversaries: 1 August

Commanders
- Current commander: Army General Dmitry Bulgakov (2008–2010)

The Rear of the Armed Forces of the Russian Federation (RAF-RF) (Russian: Тыл Вооружëнных Сил Российской Федерации, romanized: Tyl Vooruzhonnykh Sil Rossiyskoy Federatsii), often referred to in English as the rear services, was an organization of support services for the Russian Armed Forces until 2010 when it was transformed into Logistical Support of the Russian Armed Forces.

The Rear of the Armed Forces included an unusually diverse range of services, for example medical services, firefighters, logistical services, economic analysts, scientific units, and combat-ready formations for maintaining and protecting rear installations such as pipelines and railways. The Rear also had its own central staff organization.

In addition to the centrally controlled Rear of the Armed Forces, there were also separate rear services for each armed service, e.g. the Rear of the Soviet Ground Forces, Rear of the Strategic Rocket Forces, etc. In principle, these rear organizations were coordinated by the Rear of the Armed Forces.

== History ==
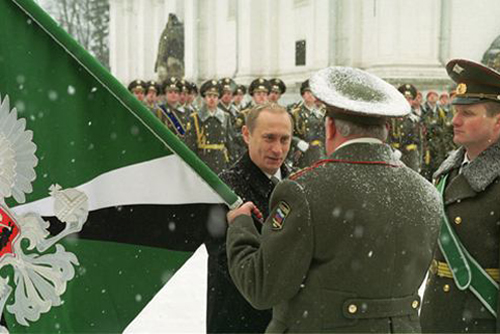
The Railway Troops are one of the best-known branches of the Rear of the Armed Forces. Russian President Vladimir Putin inspecting Railway Troops in Moscow Kremlin.

The formation of Russian rear services is commonly ascribed to the year 1700, when Peter I of Russia signed an order On Management of the Grain Supplies of All Military People to okolnichy Yazykov with Elevating Him to Commissary General After That, thus forming the first supply service (Proviantskiy Prikaz). In 1711 all military supply services were incorporated in the army. However the word "rear" (тыл) as a separate term appeared only in the Russo-Japanese War of 1904-1905. Shortly after the onset of Operation Barbarossa in 1941, the Russian rear services experienced severe difficulties, which were fixed after the order "On Organization of the Rear Services Management Office of the Red Army..." was enacted by the People's Commissar of Defence, Marshal of the Soviet Union Semyon Timoshenko. The Rear Services of the Armed Forces of the Soviet Union were renamed as the Rear Services of the Armed Forces of Russia in 1991.

In 2010 it was transformed into the Logistical Support of the Russian Armed Forces.

== Road Troops ==
The Road Troops (Russian: Дорожные войска) are a part of Material and Technical Support of the Armed Forces of the Russian Federation. They included road commandant units and formations, bridge, pontoon-bridge, as well as road units and subdivisions, designed to perform road maintenance tasks.

In Russia until 2017, there were also road construction units (since 1996 officially called road-building military formations), which were outside the size norms of the Armed Forces of the Russian Federation and included:

- from 1992 to 1997 - as part of one of the central authorities of the Ministry of Defence of the Russian Federation, and then the Central Road Construction Directorate of the Ministry of Defence of the Russian Federation (TsDSU), then the Federal Road Construction Administration (ru:Федеральное дорожно-строительное управление) of the Ministry of Defence;
- from 1997 to 2017 - the Federal Service for Special Construction of Russia, then Spetsstroy of Russia, which carried out defence-related road construction.

At present, the main composition of formations, units and subdivisions of the road troops, their institutions, institutions, enterprises and organizations, are part of the Armed Forces of the Russian Federation. Road-building formations are also part of the Military Construction Complex of the Ministry of Defence of the Russian Federation.

=== History of military road building ===
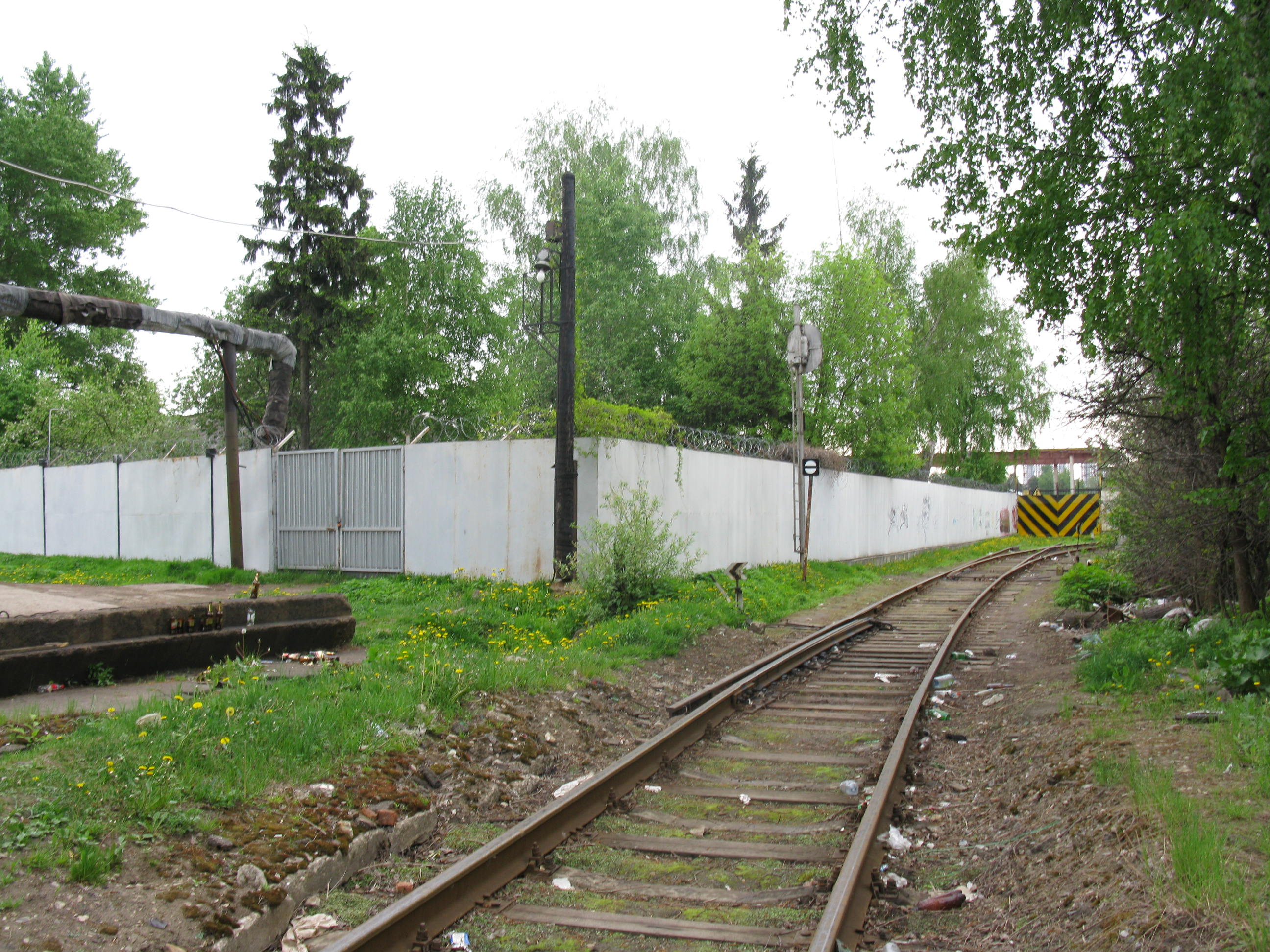
Former site of 46th Central Base of Material-Technical Support, Reutov, Moscow Oblast, photographed 2007

Road construction troops date back to Imperial Russia and even before.

In 1930, by the decision of Council of People's Commissars of the Soviet Union (the SNK USSR) and the Central Committee of the All-Union Communist Party of Bolsheviks, five automobile and road institutes were organized within the TsUDorTrans system of the People's Commissariat of Communication Routes of the Soviet Union. These five institutes were the Moscow Automobile and Road Institute, in Leningrad (LADI), in Saratov (at the Saratov State Technical University (SADI)), in Kharkov (HADI) and Omsk (SibADI) for the training of highly qualified engineers roads, bridges, mechanics and motorists. At the same time, the universities had to train within their military departments reserve officers for the Soviet Armed Forces, since the training profile of civilian specialists, who were trained in road institutes, completely coincided with their military specialties.

By the Decree of the Council of Labour and Defence of the USSR, dated December 11, 1933, the Department of Road Construction of Eastern Siberia and the Far East (Daldorstroy) was established in Khabarovsk, with the task of building strategic roads in Eastern Siberia and the Soviet Far East. Construction plans were announced at the 17th Congress of the All-Union Communist Party (Bolsheviks), held in Moscow from January 26 to February 10, 1934, when the Second Five Year Plan was adopted. In accordance with it, it was planned to build the Vladivostok-Khabarovsk highway, with a hard (gravel) surface, 600 kilometers long.

For Daldorstroy, the Red Army from December 1933 to January 1934 formed two brigades of road troops: the first - in the city of Rostov-on-Don, led by brigade commander N. M. Anisimov, and the second - in the city of Kiev (brigade commander - Lebedev), with a total number of personnel of about 15,000 people, and redeploy them to the Far East. The headquarters of the first brigade is the village of Dmitrievka, Primorsky Region, the second is the city of Khabarovsk. The first brigade was building from Vladivostok to Iman, and the second - from Iman to Khabarovsk. On November 4, 1935, the central press organ of the All-Union Communist Party of Bolsheviks, the newspaper Pravda published an article signed by the head of Daldorstroy, Comrade Yu.Apanasenko:

Starting to get acquainted with the affairs of the front and operational plans, Apanasenko discovered that along most of the Trans-Siberian Railway, with its dozens of bridges and tunnels, there is no reliable highway (Moskovsky Trakt) that would run parallel to the railway. This circumstance made the troops of the front extremely vulnerable, since the railway line sometimes passed very close to the border. It was enough for the Japanese to blow up several bridges or tunnels to deprive the armies of the front and freedom of maneuver, and reliable supplies. Apanasenko immediately ordered the construction of a reliable road with a length of almost a thousand kilometers, using not only the construction units of the front, but also the population of the surrounding areas. The deadline for this huge work was set as short as five months. ..Apanasenko's order was carried out, and the road from Khabarovsk to the station Kuibyshevka-Vostochnaya was built by September 1, 1941.

After the German invasion of the Soviet Union, which began on June 22, 1941, transport difficulties required emergency measures by the country's leadership. The State Defence Committee (GKO) adopted Decree No. 163 "On the organization of a road service on unpaved highways and the formation of motor transport battalions" on 15 July 1941. According to this decree, additional automobile and road units and formations are being formed, ten military highways (VAD) of the Headquarters of the Supreme High Command are being deployed. To manage motor transport and road support, an automobile and road administration of the Red Army was created, which was transferred from the Red Army General Staff to the Rear Services of the Red Army. The need for motor transport and road support for Red Army offensive operations required further reorganization. By GKO Decree No. 3544 of June 9, 1943, the Main Road Directorate of the Red Army was created, and the Motor Transport Directorate was included in the established Main Automobile Directorate of the Logistics of the Red Army with the corresponding structures in the fronts, armies and military districts. Not a single Second World War operation was possible without the motor transport and road services, and soldiers of automobile and road formations and units.

The GKO of the USSR decreed on 16 January 1942 that separate road construction battalions (odsb) with a strength of 477 people be formed: 8 odsb in the Moscow Military District; 6 odsb in the Volga Military District; Central Asian - eight odsb in the Central Asian Military District; 3 odsb in the Siberian Military District, 4 odsb in the South Ural Military District; six battalions in the Transcaucasian Military District, and separate bridge-building battalions (omostsb) with a personnel strength of 501 people : four in the Moscow MD, two bridge battalions in the Arkhangelsk MD, two bridge battalions in the Privolzhsky MD, two bridge battalions in the Central Asian MD, one bridge battalion in the Siberian MD, two bridge battalion in the Ural MD, one bridge building battalion in the South Ural Military District, and ten bridge building battalions in the Transcaucasian MD.

By order of the People's Commissar of Defence No. 310, the road troops emblem was introduced, consisting of symmetrically crossing axes and shovels (silver-plated for commanding officers, gilded for engineering and technical staff, brass for cadets of military schools [schools], as well as sergeants and privates). Subsequently, by order of the Minister of Defence of the Soviet Union No. 104 (23 June 1955), a common emblem was introduced for Automotive Troops and Road Troops (previously only the emblem of the Automotive Troops), and from that period it became a common emblem for these military branches until 1988.

By the middle of 1943, the road troops of the Soviet Armed Forces consisted of:

- 294 separate road battalions;
- 22 Military Highway (VAD) directorates with 110 road commandant areas (DKU);
- 7 military road departments (VDU) with 40 road detachments (DO);
- 194 horse transport companies;
- repair bases;
- bases for the production of bridge and road structures;
- educational and other institutions.

In total, there were 400,000 road warriors at the front. During the Great Patriotic War they restored, repaired and built about 100,000 kilometers of roads, more than a million running meters of bridges, harvested and transported for road construction over 20,000,000 cubic meters of sand and stone. The total length of the military highways maintained by the road troops was 359,000 kilometers. For exemplary performance, 59 units of the road troops were awarded orders, 27 of them received honorary titles, more than 21,000 soldiers were awarded orders and medals.

After the end of the war, it was decided to reduce the "road troops" of the Soviet Armed Forces. Of the reduced units and units in 1945, by the decision of the State Defense Committee, a road construction unit was created - the Special Road Construction Corps of the People's Commissariat of Internal Affairs (NKVD), consisting of four road construction divisions, for the construction and restoration of the Soviet road network destroyed during the war (main highways of national importance, roads of defense significance). The new NKVD road corps was to be formed on the basis of the disbanded Armed Forces road troops. Two divisions participated in the construction in the territories of Tsimlyansk hydroelectric complex, Kuibyshevskaya HPP, oil fields of Tatar Republic and Bashkiria, mica mines Transbaikalia, the third in Rostov-on-Don and the fourth in Kharkov, built the main roads of national importance Kharkov - Rostov-on-Don, Kharkov - Simferopol and other BP. Between 1946 and 1956, he built 3,244 km of paved roads, 17 km of bridges, and laid 2.7 km of reinforced concrete pipes.

By a Decree of the Central Committee of the CPSU and the Council of Ministers of the USSR, dated October 23, 1970, regarding Central Asia, separate road construction brigades (odsbr) were created in the Main Military Construction Directorate (GVSU) of the Ministry of Defence, which were deployed and began in 1970 construction and reconstruction along the M55 highway between Irkutsk and Chita in Transbaikalia. Financing of construction and reconstruction was carried out via monies allocated centrally once a year by the Council of Ministers of the RSFSR. The total length of the road from Irkutsk to Chita reached 1,172 km, of which 566 km were existing paved sections, and 606 km were to be rebuilt by three separate road construction teams. Work began in 1970 at three sites:

- Baikalsk - Posolskoye with a length of 178.5 km;
- Mukhorshibir - Glinka with a length of 178.5 km;
- Bludnaya River - Cheremkhovo with a length of 178.5 km

Emblem of the Road Troops, adopted in 1988

In total, 606 km of roads with asphalt concrete pavement were built and put into operation on the Irkutsk-Chita road in accordance with the standards of the 3rd technical category, while 207,000,000 rubles of capital investments (in estimated 1969 prices) were invested. A total of 103 capital bridges; 480 culverts; 12 complexes of buildings and structures of the road maintenance service; eight petrol stations; three bus stations; and two service stations (SRT) of cars and road vehicles were built.

As the work on their sections was completed, the road construction brigades shifted to work on the M58 highway between Chita and Khabarovsk.

Work on the construction and reconstruction of the "Irkutsk - Chita" road was basically completed in 1981. During the reconstruction and construction of the "Irkutsk - Chita" road (1970-1981) on the section of the river Bludna - Cheremkhovo, a number of large excavations was developed using powerful directed explosions with laying up to 400 tons of explosive per explosion.

The road construction brigades worked on the construction of the Chita-Khabarovsk road, the "Amur Wheel". Work started in 1977 on two sites:

- Chita - Nikolaevka - Znamenka in Chita Oblast;
- Pashkovo — Svobodny — in Amur Oblast

Later, it was decided to build, by the forces of three special brigades of the Main Military Construction Directorate, from two directions:

- one special brigade of the GVSU of the USSR Ministry of Defense launched construction on the Chita - Nikolaevka - Znamenka section from the western direction;
- one special brigade of the GVSU of the USSR Ministry of Defense launched construction on the eastern section of the road in the direction of Pashkovo - Arkhara - Zavitinsk;
- one special brigade of the GVSU of the USSR Ministry of Defense launched construction on the eastern section of the road in the direction of Zavitinsk - Belogorsk - Svobodny - Sivaki.

The total length of the AD (with entrances) reached 2283 km, of which the existing paved road was 370 km. It was necessary to build 1913 km of new capital road.

From the beginning of construction until 1992, 510 km of the road were built by the personnel of the Specialized Brigades, and more than 300,000,000 rubles of capital investments were disbursed (in estimated prices of 1969). From 1984 to 1992, the M58 built:

- more than 30 capital bridges and overpasss, including a large 750 metre bridge across the River Zeya;
- two complexes of buildings and structures of the road and motor transport services of the road;
- petrol stations;
- posts of the State Automobile Inspectorate and other objects

All these tasks were performed by the following Road Troops formations:

- 70th Separate road construction brigade;
- 146th Separate Road Construction Brigade;
- 159th Separate Road Construction Brigade;
- 160th separate road construction brigade.

In accordance with an Armed Forces General Staff directive, in 1969, under the Ministry of Construction and Maintenance of Roads of the Ukrainian SSR, the 60th Independent Road Construction Brigade was formed in Mukachevo. In the period from 1970 to 1980, military road builders built more than 70 kilometers of roads in the Mukachevo - Lviv direction, dozens of bridges in difficult mountainous conditions Karpaty. Having completed the tasks assigned to it, the 60th Independent Road Construction brigade, by decision of the Government of the USSR, at the end of 1980 was redeployed from Transcarpathia to Tyumen Oblast for the construction and reconstruction of roads to the facilities oil and gas complex of Western Siberia, the construction of artificial structures on them, as well as for the construction of industrial facilities. Parts of 60th Specialized Road Construction Brigade, were deployed in the settlements Surgut, Noyabrsk, Novy Urengoy, Nadym, Beloyarsky took part in the construction of roads, gas pipeline and Urengoy - Pomary - Uzhgorod, the arrangement of compressor stations, industrial and other facilities, produced industrial products for the needs of the region.

The Road Troops took part in the Soviet invasion of Afghanistan as part of the Limited Contingent of Soviet Forces in Afghanistan (OKSVA). They first deployed a separate road commandant battalion (army) and then with the 278th Separate Road Commandant Brigade (278 odkbr) at Chaugani in Baghlan Province, the operational maintenance of the army's highway from the Soviet-Afghan border at Hairatan to Kabul to Pul-i-Charkhi was carried out.

At different times, the Limited Contingent/40th Army (Soviet Union) included:

- 159th Separate Road Construction Brigade;
- 58th Separate Automotive Brigade;
- 59th Brigade of Material Support (Puli-Khumri 1988)

In accordance with the directive of the Minister of Defence of the USSR of June 1, 1988, the 307th Training Road Brigade (307 uchdbr) (V/Ch 32213) was established in Slutsk in the Belorussian Military District. The 29th Tank Division was also located in the town. Another road training brigade, the 308th, was located at Skala-Podolskaya in the Carpathian Military District.

=== Road Troops under the Russian Flag from 1992 ===
The Road troops of the Russian Federation today consist of separate road commandant and bridge brigades, separate road commandant, road, bridge, bridge preparation battalions, other units, institutions and organizations. Training of specialists for road troops is carried out at Military Academy of Logistics named after General of the Army A.V. Khrulev (St. Petersburg), at Military Departments (Faculties of Military Education, cycles) with seven civil higher educational institutions (university) of the Russian Federation.

The Road Troops of the North Caucasus Military District included in the Joint Group for the counter-terrorist operation, were very limited: parts of the road commandant's brigade, three road depots and road maintenance sections of the Ministry of Defense of the Russian Federation (Russian Ministry of Defense). In Chechenya, they restored bridges across the river (river) Terek in the area of the settlement Chervlyonnaya, r. Argun and r. Sunzha — in Petropavlovsk.

The Road Troops also reacted after floods damaged infrastructure. In 2002, road builders quickly restored bridges across the river Argun in Shatoi and across the river. Kuban on a federal highway in the city of Nevinnomyssk.

From October to December 2006, the 100th Separate Bridge Battalion, Central Automobile and Road Administration of the Russian Ministry of Defense assisted with transport infrastructure in Lebanon.

=== Soviet road building authorities ===
In various periods of the history of the Soviet Union, for one reason or another, in various government departments (sometimes simultaneously), there were various control bodies for road-building military formations:

- Central Directorate of highways and dirt roads, and motor transport (TSUDORTRANS) under the Council of People's Commissars of the Soviet Union (1933-1936);
- Main Directorate of Highways (GUSHOSDOR) Ministry of Internal Affairs of the USSR (1946-1953) from 1936 to 1946:
  - Main Directorate of Highways of the NKVD of the USSR;
- Central Automobile and Road Administration (TsDA) of the Ministry of Defense of the USSR (1987—1992) until 1987
  - Road Administration of the Ministry of Defense of the USSR (1969—1987);
  - Directorate of the Road Service Central Directorate of Military Communications (TsUP VOSO) Ministry of Defense of the USSR (1961-1969);
  - Department of the Road Service of the Ministry of Defence of the USSR (1959—1961)
  - Road department of the Headquarters Rear Services of the Armed Forces of the USSR (1946-1959)
  - Main Road Directorate of the Red Army (1943-1946)
  - Main Directorate of Motor Transport and Road Service of the Red Army (1942-1943)
  - Automobile and Road Administration of the Red Army (1941-1942)
  - 6th Department (Motor Transport and Road Service) Red Army General Staff (1938-1941);
- Central Road Construction Administration (TSDSU) of the Ministry of Defence of the USSR (1988-1992);
- Road Construction Department of the Main Military Construction Directorate of the USSR Ministry of Defence (GVSU) (1969—1992)
  - 1310th Construction Board (1989-1992)

== Current Agencies ==
The rear services of the Armed Forces of Russia included:

- Main Military Medical Department of the RF Defence Ministry
- Main Department of Military Transportation of the RF Defence Ministry
- Central Automobile Road Department of the RF Defence Ministry
- Central Department of Rocket and Other Fuel of the RF Defence Ministry
- Central Food Department of the RF Defence Ministry
- Central Clothing Department of the RF Defence Ministry
- Fire Rescue and Local Defence Service of the RF Armed Forces
- Veterinary and Sanitary Service of the RF Armed Forces
- Economic Security Department of the RF Armed Forces
- Main Trade Department of the RF Defence Ministry
- Main Department of Active Leisure of the RF Defence Ministry
- Agricultural Department of the RF Defence Ministry
- Military Science Committee of the RF Armed Forces Rear
- Secretariat of the Chief of the RF Armed Forces Rear
- Personnel Department of the RF Armed Forces Rear
- Signal Troops of the RF Armed Forces Rear
- Russian Railway Troops (since 5 October 2004)
- Russian Automobile Troops
- Russian Road Troops
- Russian Pipeline Troops

Aside from these, all the branches of the Russian Armed Forces maintain their respective rear services, which report to the Rear Services HQ.
