= Strategic direction =

The term strategic direction may refer to:

- strategic management
- strategic direction in the Soviet Army
