= Mikhail Mizintsev =

Russian military commander (born 1962)

- Михаил Мизинцев
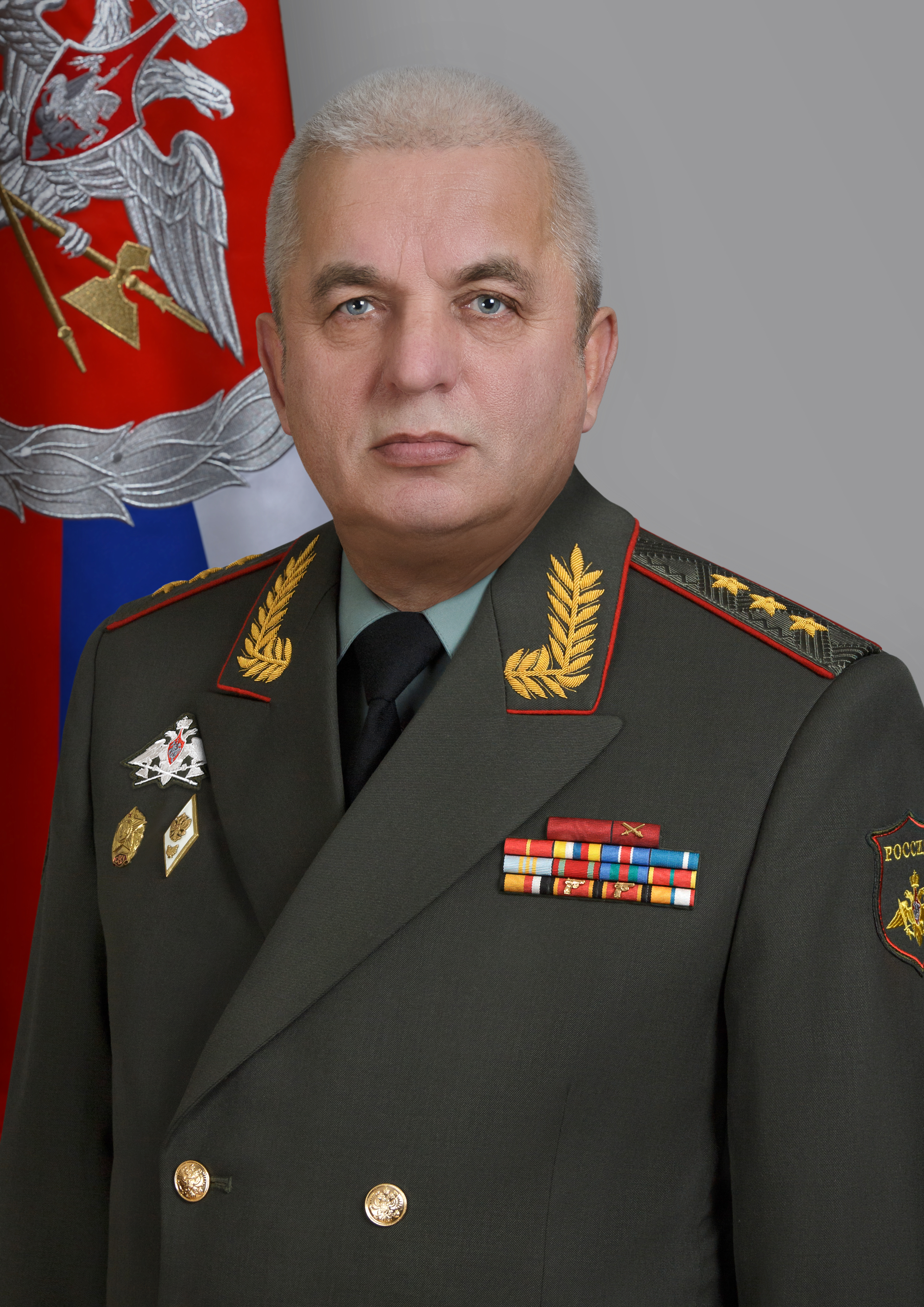
- Mizintsev in 2022

Deputy Minister of Defence
- In office 24 September 2022 – 27 April 2023
- Minister: Sergei Shoigu
- Preceded by: Dmitry Bulgakov
- Succeeded by: Alexey Kuzmenkov

Director of the National Defense Management Center
- In office 1 December 2014 – 24 September 2022
- Preceded by: Office established
- Succeeded by: Oleg Gorshenin

Director of the Central Command Post of the General Staff of the Armed Forces
- In office August 2012 – 1 December 2014
- Succeeded by: Office abolished

Personal details
- Born: 10 September 1962 (age 64) Averinskaya, Vologda Oblast, Soviet Union

Military service
- Allegiance: Soviet Union; Russia
- Years of service: 1980–present
- Rank: Colonel general
- Battles/wars: Syrian Civil War; Battle of Aleppo; Russo-Ukrainian War; Russian invasion of Ukraine; Siege of Mariupol

Mikhail Yevgenyevich Mizintsev (Russian: Михаил Евгеньевич Мизинцев; born 10 September 1962) is a Russian colonel general. He headed the National Defense Management Center of Russia, served as the deputy minister of defence of Russia for logistics from 24 September 2022 to 27 April 2023, and later in Wagner Group.

During the Russian invasion of Ukraine, Mizintsev commanded Russian forces during the siege of Mariupol. He commanded numerous attacks on civilians, including airstrikes on the city's theatre and hospital, which were denounced as war crimes and earned him the nickname of "Butcher of Mariupol".

== Military career ==
Mizintsev began his military career in 1980, under the Soviet Union, and continued serving in the Russian Ground Forces after its dissolution.

=== Syrian civil war ===
He allegedly orchestrated bombing campaigns during the Russian military intervention in the Syrian civil war, including at the battle of Aleppo. He was accused of arranging a brutal bombing campaign that annihilated Aleppo. He is a recipient of the "Participant of the military operation in Syria" Medal.

=== Russo–Ukraine War ===
During the 2022 Russian invasion of Ukraine, Mizintsev led troops during the siege of Mariupol, reportedly taking a personal role in directing the siege. He has been accused of war crimes by multiple people, including Ukrainian human rights lawyer Oleksandra Matviichuk, who stated that he should be held accountable for war crimes at the International Criminal Court in The Hague.

Mizintsev has denied these accusations, blaming Ukrainian forces for creating "a terrible humanitarian catastrophe", accusing the Azov Battalion of hiding inside the drama theatre and hospital, and claiming he will allow the "safe exit" of anyone in Mariupol who surrenders. His claims have been refuted by sources which assert refugees are being attacked and sent to filtration camps.

On 24 September 2022, Mizintsev was appointed deputy minister of defense of Russia and Chief of the Rear Services of the Armed Forces of Russia, replacing Dmitry Bulgakov.

On 27 April 2023, Russian military correspondent Alexander Sladkov confirmed via Telegram that Mizintsev was dismissed from his post as deputy defense minister for logistics.

On 5 May 2023, Reuters reported that Mizintsev was visible in two videos on Telegram posted by war correspondent Alexander Simonov wearing Wagner-branded combat gear. He was shown visiting a training camp and touring Russian positions in Bakhmut. In a video statement, Yevgeny Prigozhin praised Mizintsev but did not confirm or deny that he was hired by Wagner. Per a Polish Centre for Eastern Studies report detailing the fallout after Prigozhin's mutiny, Mizintsev's dismissal as deputy defense minister was indeed due to his collaboration with Prigozhin, and he was confirmed as a member of Wagner Group’s command structure before the Wagner Group rebellion in June 2023 and Prigozhin's subsequent death on 23 August. Mizintsev's subsequent whereabouts remain unknown. He was replaced in his ministerial post by Alexey Kuzmenkov.

== Sanctions ==
He has been sanctioned by the United Kingdom, Japan, New Zealand, the European Union, Canada, Switzerland, Australia, and Ukraine.

Military offices
Preceded by Position Created	Director of the National Defense Management Center; 2014–2022	Succeeded by Oleg Gorshenin
