= Logistical Support of the Russian Armed Forces =

Russian Armed Forces' unified technical and logistical support service

- Материально-техническое обеспечение Вооружённых сил Российской Федерации
- Middle Emblem
- Founded: 2010
- Country: Russian Federation
- Branch: Russian Armed Forces
- Part of: Ministry of Defence
- Garrison/HQ: Moscow
- Patron: Joseph Volotsky
- Motto: "Никто лучше нас!'' (Nobody is better than us!)
- Anniversaries: 1 August
- Engagements: Russian military intervention in the Syrian civil war Russian invasion of Ukraine
- Website: https://mto.ric.mil.ru/

Commanders
- Current commander: Colonel General Valery Solodchuk

Insignia
- Flag

- Great Emblem

Logistical Support of the Russian Armed Forces (Russian: Материально-техническое обеспечение Вооружённых сил Российской Федерации, literally Materiel-Technical Support) or MTO are a unified system of command and control bodies, institutions and other military organizations that provide technical and logistical support for all branches of the Russian Armed Forces. The MTO system of the Russian Armed Forces combines 2 previously independent types of comprehensive support: technical and logistical, both of which existed in the structure of the Rear of the Russian Armed Forces up until it was dissolved in 2010. The management of Logistical Support is entrusted to the central bodies of military command, subordinate to the Deputy Minister of Defence.

Deputy Defence Minister for logistics Army General Dmitry Bulgakov, in post 2010-2022, was replaced by Colonel-General Mikhail Mizintsev, the previous head of the MoD's National Defence Management Center.

Mizintsev was then replaced during the Russian invasion of Ukraine. He left the Armed Forces for the Wagner PMC. Colonel General Alexey Kuzmenkov was appointed deputy minister of defence for logistics, Western media sources reported on 30 April 2023. On 11 March 2024, Lieutenant General Andrey Bulyga was appointed as Deputy Minister of Defense of the Russian Federation for Logistics and director of the service. On 8 November 2025, Colonel General Aleksandr Sanchik was appointed as Deputy Minister of Defense of the Russian Federation and director of the service.

== Composition ==
The structure of the Central Office of the Logistics Department of the Armed Forces of Russia:

- Logistics Headquarters of the Armed Forces of the Russian Federation
- Department of Transport Support of the Ministry of Defence
- Department of Operational Maintenance and Provision of Utilities for Military Units and Organizations of the Ministry of Defence
- Food Directorate of the Ministry of Defence
- Main Agency of Automobiles and Tanks of the Ministry of Defense of the Russian Federation
- Main Missile and Artillery Directorate
- Main Directorate of the Chief of the Railway Troops
- Meteorology Department of the Russian Armed Forces

=== Educational institutions ===
The training of MTO specialists is carried out by the Military Logistics Academy.

=== Current agencies ===
The agencies under the MTO include:

- Road Troops
- Railway Troops
- Pipeline Troops

=== Regional units and formations ===
- 1060th Centre for Material-Technical Support (Moscow Military District)
- 1061st Centre for Material-Technical Support (Southern Military District)
- Centres for Materiel-Technical Support in the Central and Eastern Military Districts
- Twelve independent Materiel-Technical Support brigades (ru:Бригада материально-технического обеспечения)
- Railway brigades

== See also ==
- Belarusian Transport Troops
- United States Army Logistics Branch
- ru:Строительные войска - Soviet and Russian Construction Troops
