= Formations of the Soviet Army =

Organizations and formations within the Soviet Armed Forces

Formations of the Soviet Army were organizational groups used to divide the armed forces of the Soviet Union after 1945. The largest organizational groups were teatr voennykh deistvii, ("theatres of military operations", TMOs, or Strategic Directions), which comprised large areas of the world. During war time, forces in these TVDs could be organised into various fronts (similar to army groups in other militaries), or armies during peacetime. Domestically, Soviet Army forces were assigned to various Military Districts. Lesser organizational groups include corps and divisions.

== Formations ==
=== Theatre of Military Operations ===
These theatres were the area of operations for military operations in a large geographic area. During and after the Second World War, six strategic direction headquarters existed as part of the Stavka, the Soviet military high command:

Strategic Directions of the Soviet Army During WWII
Command	Commander	Years in operation	Successor
Main Command of Forces along the Western Direction		1941–1942	Stavaka Representative Role
Main Command of Forces along the Northwestern Direction	Kliment Voroshilov	1941–1942	Stavaka Representative Role
Chief Command of the troops of the North Caucasus Direction	Semyon Budyonny	1941– 19 May 1942	North Caucasus Front
Main Command of Forces along the South Western Direction	Semyon Budyonny	1941–1942	Stavaka Representative Role
Central Headquarters of the Partisan Movement		30 May 1942–1945	
Chief command of the Soviet troops in the Far East		1949–1953	

The Chief Command of the troops of the North Caucasus Direction included the Crimean Front; the Sevastopol defensive area; the North Caucasus Military District; the Black Sea Fleet; the Azov Flotilla, two rifle divisions, two rifle brigades, and a cavalry corps of four cavalry divisions. Marshal Semyon Budyonny was appointed as the commander-in-chief. On 19 May 1942 the Stavka dissolved both the North Caucasus High Command and the Crimean Front, and a North Caucasus Front was formed in their place.

In 1979, new headquarters in the theatres of military operations were established:

- In their most modern form, High Commands for the TMOs were first re-established in February 1979 for the Far East. Harrison wrote in the 2020s that the new command encompassed the Far East Military District and the Transbaikal Military District. An official military encyclopedia published after the dissolution of the Soviet Union stated, said Harrison, that the Soviet Pacific Fleet, an air army, and an air defence corps were also operationally subordinated to the new formation; and that the high command "coordinated" with the armies of Vietnam, Laos, Cambodia, and Mongolia. The headquarters was set up at Ulan-Ude, near Lake Baikal. The RAND Corporation said in 1984 that the Soviet air and ground forces in Mongolia [subordinate to the Transbaikal Military District] and elements of the Mongolian Ground Forces and Mongolian Air Force were also at its disposal.
- In September 1984 three more High Commands were established: the Western (HQ Legnica, Military Unit Number 30172), South-Western (HQ Kishinev), and Southern (HQ Baku). The experience of creating the main commands of the troops of directorates during the Great Patriotic War, when their improvised creation, as a rule, did not improve, and often worsened the leadership of the troops, was critically considered. The main task was to create a workable control system both in peacetime and in wartime. Despite the widespread reporting that the new High Commands would control both Soviet and allied forces, in a 1993 article Colonel General M.N. Tereschenko (ru:Терещенко, Михаил Никитович), chief of staff and first deputy commander-in-chief of the Western High Command 1984–88, wrote that the Western High Command was "only for Soviet forces." The new system was tested in the course of the Soyuz-83 operational-strategic exercises, when for the first time the headquarters of the main command in the Western theater of operations was expanded to its full staff. On 1 July 1991 the Western High Command moved to Smolensk. General of the Army Yuri Maksimov was appointed Commander-in-Chief of the Forces of the Southern High Command from September 1984 to July 1985. The Southern Direction's forces in total included the North Caucasus, Transcaucasus, and Turkestan MDs, five armies, five army corps (12th, 31st, 34th, 36th, and 42nd), the Caspian Flotilla, and the 12th and 19th Armies of the Soviet Air Defence Forces. Army General Mikhail Zaitsev was commander-in-chief of the Southern High Command from 1985 to 1989, by which time he was thus supervising the Limited Contingent of Soviet Forces in Afghanistan (40th Army; air forces; forces of the Rear Services and special troops; and Border and KGB forces) as well.
- In 1986 the U.S. Department of Defense's Soviet Military Power identified ten continental and four oceanic TVDs, possibly better translated in modern terms as Theatres of Strategic Military Action. However most were merely geographical areas without forces or headquarters: North American, South American, African, Australian, Antarctic, Arctic Ocean, Atlantic, Indian Ocean, and Pacific. Plans appears to have existed to form a Northwestern TVD headquarters on the basis of the Staff of the Leningrad Military District.

=== Military districts ===
Military districts of the Soviet Union in 1991

Military districts (MDs) were under the direct control of the Ministry of Defence. They existed primarily to "train and mobilise troops so as to ensure a high level of combat readiness." Had a war broken out, many of the districts were likely slotted for service under one of the four existing TMOs at the time, with a fifth being contemplated if necessary. The Moscow, Volga and Urals Military Districts would have likely formed the Wartime Central Reserve.

The most combat-ready formations within any MD would conduct operations in adjacent theatres under the direction of the appropriate TMO headquarters, while the MD itself would continue to form, equip, and train new military formations for subsequent service abroad while also maintaining domestic political and economic order and conducting local defence.

=== Group of Forces ===
These peacetime administrative units would provide support to between one and six fronts during wartime. Groups of forces in Eastern Europe included the Central Group of Forces (Czechoslovakia), the Group of Soviet Forces in Germany, the Northern Group of Forces (Poland), and the Southern Group of Forces (Balkans initially, then Hungary).

=== Front ===
Fronts were the largest wartime field formation, equivalent to an army group in many other forces. The Imperial Russian Army designated "fronts" in World War I; the Soviets used the concept from the Russian Civil War of 1917–1922 onwards. A frontal Air Army was "ordinarily assigned to each Front (Army Group) of the ground forces, to provide cover, support, interdiction, and reconnaissance for the appropriate sector of the front. In peacetime, those military districts designated for activation, as fronts in wartime are generally each assigned a tactical air army."

=== Army ===
Armies were the largest peacetime field formation. Each army was designated a combined arms army or a tank army. During World War II, the Fortified Region usually corresponded to an Army frontage formation. See Karelian Fortified Region and Kiev Fortified Region.

=== Corps ===
Corps were large, specialised groups that included Rifle, Cavalry, Artillery, Mechanised, Tank, and Airborne Corps. There were also corps as part of the Soviet Air Forces and the Soviet Air Defence Forces. The 64th Fighter Aviation Corps was formed to fight in the Korean War, 1950–53.

- Rifle Corps: formations that existed in the pre-Revolutionary Imperial Russian Army were inherited by the Red Army.
- The formation of large mechanised or tank formations in the Soviet Union was first suggested based on development of doctrine for publication as PU-36, the field regulations of 1936, largely authored by Marshal Mikhail Tukhachevsky. The Red Army put the concept into practice where "In the attack tanks must be employed in mass", envisaged as "Strategic cavalry". Although the name of "mechanised" may seem to the modern reader as referring to the infantry components of the Corps, in 1936 the term referred to armoured vehicles only with the word "motorised" referring to the units equipped with trucks.

=== Divisions ===
Divisions were a smaller formation, and originally only included rifle or cavalry divisions, but later evolved to include motor-rifle, tank, artillery, aviation, sapper or airborne divisions. By the mid-1980s, the Ground Forces contained at least 210 manoeuvre divisions. About three-quarters were motor rifle divisions and the remainder tank divisions.

The first iteration of the Red Army's tank divisions, as part of the Mechanised Corps which began to form in the late 1930s, were in 1940 organized under Shtat (Table of Organisation and Equipment) 010/10; their tank regiments under Shtat 010/16; and their mechanised regiments under Shtat 010/15. The Mechanised Corps Headquarters was organised in accordance with Shtat 010/20. The motorized divisions of the corps were organized by Shtat 05/70, Division Headquarters; Shtat 05/71, Motorized Rifle Regiment, Shtat 05/72 Artillery Regiment and Shtat 05/73, Tank Regiment.

== Administrative groupings ==
"For administrative purposes, the Soviet ground forces comprise[d] three categories: combat arms branches (troops), special troops, and services."

From the 1950s to the 1980s the branches ("rods") of the Ground Forces included the Motor Rifle Troops; the Soviet Airborne Forces, from April 1956 to March 1964; Air Assault Troops (ru:Airborne Assault Formations of the Ground Forces of the USSR, from 1968 to August 1990); the Tank Troops; the Rocket Forces and Artillery (ru:Ракетные войска и артиллерия СССР, from 1961, including artillery observation units); Army Aviation, until December 1990; Signals Troops; the Engineer Troops; the Air Defence Troops of the Ground Forces (see Air Defence Troops of the Russian Ground Forces and ru:Войска противовоздушной обороны Сухопутных войск СССР); the Chemical Troops; and the Rear of the Ground Forces. The last frontline cavalry units disappeared in the 1950s (seemingly 1955). </ref>

The special troops (ru:Специальные войска) - Engineer (but see above); Signal - Communication Troops of the Ministry of Defense of the Soviet Union; Russian Signal Troops); Chemical (but see above); Motor Transport; Railroad, and Road Troops "provide[d] combat support to the combined arms field forces of the ground forces. They also support the other components of the armed forces. For this reason, they are administered centrally from directorates in the MOD."

Services included Medical Troops; veterinary; topographical survey (военно-топографическую службу); finance, military justice; band (Military Band Service Directorate (or Directorate of Military Music) in the MOD); intendance (quartermaster); and administrative.

Rear services (logistics) included a variety of Specialised Troops; Automotive Troops, which provided drivers and mechanics, and the construction components, including the Railway Troops (see Russian Railway Troops and including armoured trains); the Road Troops (ru:Дорожные войска); and the Pipeline Troops; plus army dogs and veterinary troops.

The Commandant's Service was the only rough equivalent to Western military police. Their principal tasks were garrison security and traffic control.

Other branches might have included smoke troops; army propaganda troops; fortification engineers and fortification signals; and mobilisation processing personnel (including Voenkomats, Military commissariats).

== See also ==
- ru:Главные командования войск направлений – High Command of Forces
