= Mikhail Zaitsev =

Soviet general (1923–2009)

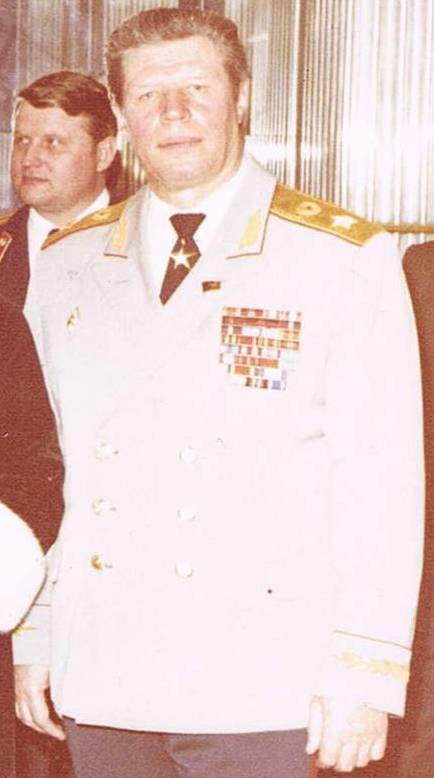

Personal details
- Born: Mikhail Zaitsev; 23 November 1923 Zadowski Chutor, Tula Oblast, Russian SFSR, Soviet Union
- Died: 22 January 2009 (aged 85) Moscow, Russia
- Party: Communist Party of the Soviet Union
- Profession: Soldier
- Awards: Hero of the Soviet Union; Order of Lenin (2)

Military service
- Allegiance: Soviet Union
- Branch/service: Soviet Army
- Years of service: 1941–1992
- Rank: Army General
- Commands: Group of Soviet Forces in Germany
- Battles/wars: Great Patriotic War; Soviet–Afghan War

Mikhail Mitrofanovich Zaitsev (Russian: Михаи́л Митрофа́нович За́йцев; 23 November 1923 – 22 January 2009) was a general of the Soviet Army. Zaitsev's principal commands were the Group of Soviet Forces in Germany and the southern military districts of the Soviet Union.

== Second World War ==
Zaitsev was born in 1923 and attended middle school before volunteering for the Soviet Army in 1941. In May 1942, Zaitsev was transferred to the combat arms and served as a staff officer in the 113th Tank Brigade and later the 7th Guards Tank Corps. He was transferred to the headquarters of the 6th Guards Tank Corps. Zaitsev took part in the battles of Kursk and Berlin, as well as major Soviet operations such as Lvov-Sandomierz, Vistula-Oder, and the drive on Prague. Zaitsev ended his wartime service assigned to the 1st Ukrainian Front.

== Postwar ==
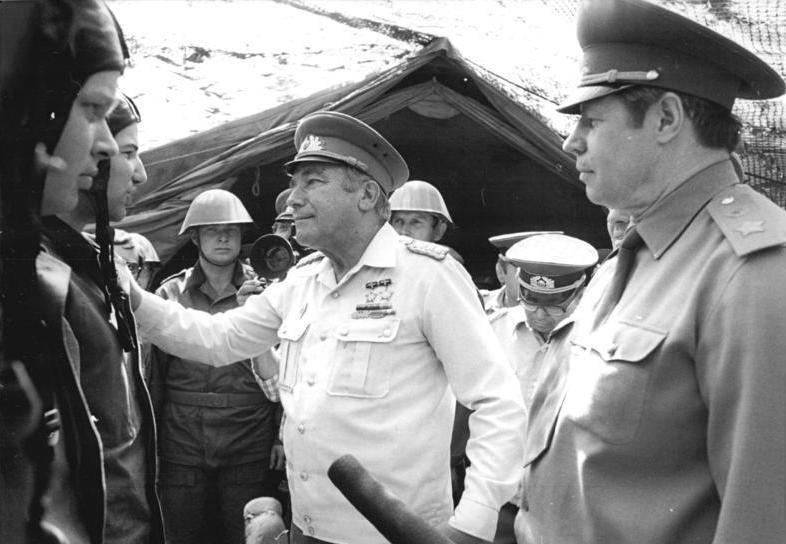
General Zaitsev, on right, during a visit to East German troops in June 1981.

Following the war, Zaitsev served in a variety of staff assignments that built upon his expertise with armored forces and warfare. He commanded the 17th Guards Tank Division from August 1965 to January 1967 and the 120th Guards Motor Rifle Division from January 1967 to 12 November 1968. Zaitsev served as chief of staff of the 7th Tank Army from 12 November 1968 to 2 December 1969, rising to command the 5th Guards Tank Army on 2 December 1969. Zaitsev became first deputy commander of the Belorussian Military District on 11 August 1972, rising to command of the district itself on 28 May 1976.

Zaitsev was transferred to East Germany and became commander of the Group of Soviet Forces in Germany (GSFG) on 25 November 1980, a position he held until 6 July 1985. Zaitsev was made a Hero of the Soviet Union on 22 November 1983. Zaitsev's priorities for GSFG included training that stressed the use of individual initiative by junior officers.

During his tour of command of GSFG, a crisis with the United States broke out because of the shooting of Arthur D. Nicholson, a U.S. officer assigned to the U.S. Military Liaison Mission in East Germany. Zaitsev subsequently had a tense meeting with General Glenn K. Otis, the commander of U.S. Army Europe, in which Zaitsev stated the Soviet forces had not acted improperly when Nicholson was shot.

From 6 July 1985 until 5 January 1989, Zaitsev commanded the Southern Strategic Direction (three southern military districts of the Soviet Union, including the Turkestan Military District, see Formations of the Soviet Army) and thus supervised the Limited Contingent of Soviet Forces in Afghanistan, mostly made up of troops of the 40th Army and the Air Force's 34th Composite Aviation Corps, plus Border and KGB Troops. From 1989 until his retirement in 1992, Zaitsev was assigned to the Group of Inspectors General of the Soviet Ministry of Defense.

In 1981, he was a member of the Central Committee of the Communist Party, and from 1979 until 1989 he was a member of the Supreme Soviet.

In retirement, he lived in Moscow until his death on 22 January 2009. General Mikhail Zaitsev is interred in Troyekurovskoye Cemetery.

== Dates of rank ==
- Major General of Tank Troops (23 February 1967)
- Lieutenant General of Tank Troops (29 April 1970)
- Colonel General of Tank Troops (28 October 1976)
- Army General (4 November 1980)
