= Dmitry Bulgakov =

Russian military logistician (born 1954)

- Дмитрий Витальевич Булгаков
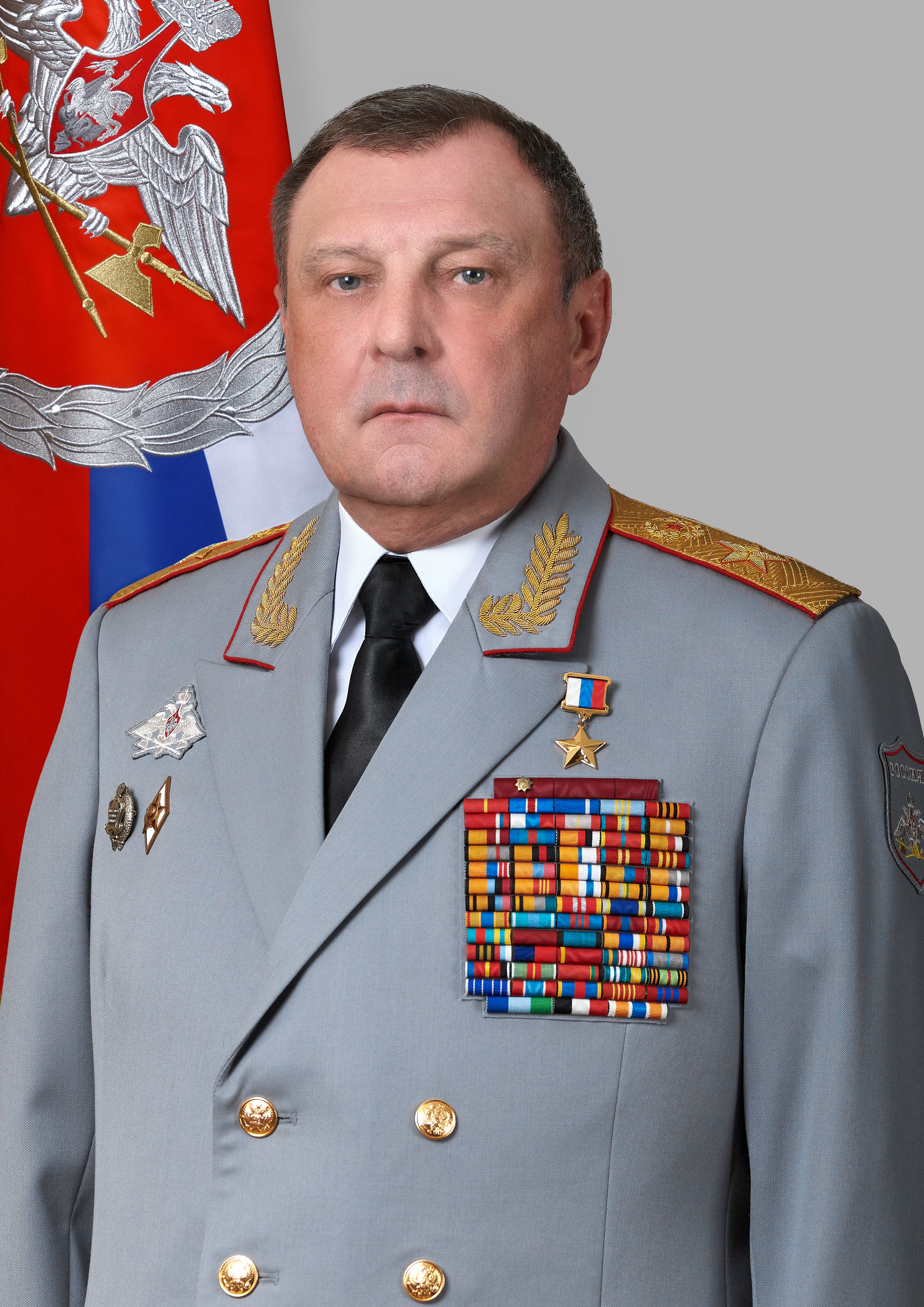
- Born: Dmitry Vitalyevich Bulgakov; 20 October 1954 (age 71); Verkhneye Gurovo, Kursk Oblast, Russian SSR, Soviet Union
- Military career
- Allegiance: Soviet Union; Russia
- Branch: Soviet Army; Russian Ground Forces
- Service years: 1972–2022
- Rank: Army General
- Awards: Hero of the Russian Federation

Dmitry Vitalyevich Bulgakov (Russian: Дмитрий Витальевич Булгаков; born 20 October 1954) is a former Russian Ground Forces officer, a specialist in the field of logistic support of the armed forces. He was Deputy Minister of Defense of the Russian Federation from 2 December 2008. He was a general of the army as of 2011, and was awarded the title Hero of the Russian Federation in 2016.

In September 2022, due to the Russian army's widespread logistical problems in the invasion of Ukraine, he was dismissed and replaced by colonel general Mikhail Mizintsev.

== Biography ==
Dmitry Bulgakov was born on 20 October 1954.

Bulgakov joined the army in 1972 and studied the Volsk Higher Military School of Logistics named after the Lenin Red Banner Komsomol between 1972 and 1976. He graduated from the Military Academy of Logistics and Transport between 1982 and 1984. In 1992, he became a Major General. Bulgakov also studied from the Military Academy of the General Staff of the Armed Forces of Russia between 1994 and 1996. In 1996, he was promoted to lieutenant general.

Between 1996 and 1997, he served as chief of a food warehouse, chief of a storage department, a deputy commander of a separate communications regiment for logistics, deputy brigade commander for logistics, deputy commander of a motorized rifle division for logistics, deputy chief of logistics of the Trans-Baikal Military District, and chief of the logistics staff of the Moscow Military District.

From 1997 to 2008, he was the chief of staff of Logistics of the Armed Forces of Russia. Bulgakov became a colonel general in 2008. From 2 December 2008 to 27 July 2010, Bulgakov became the Chief of Logistics of the Armed Forces, and the Deputy Minister of Defense. Since 27 July 2010, he was promoted as the Deputy Minister of Defense. Bulgakov supervises the Logistical Support of the Russian Armed Forces. On 23 February 2011, Bulgakov was given the military rank of Army General by the Decree of the President of Russia.

From 2015 to 2017, Bulgakov was in charge of issues related to the construction of a railway line bypassing Ukraine. Since the beginning of the Russian military operation in Syria in September 2015, he is in charge of the supply of Russian troops stationed in Syria.

For courage and heroism shown in the performance of military duty, in May 2016, Bulgakov was awarded the title of Hero of the Russian Federation. In 2019, Bulgakov led the Operational Group of the Russian Ministry of Defense for extinguishing forest fires in the Krasnoyarsk Krai, Irkutsk Oblast, Buryatia, Zabaykalsky Krai, and Yakutia. On 7 October 2020, as part of the SPM crew, he personally entered the territory of a burning ammunition warehouse in the Ryazan Oblast.

On 24 September 2022, the Russian defence ministry announced Bulgakov's dismissal from the post of deputy defence minister in charge of logistics, a move widely seen as punishment for failures in the Russian invasion of Ukraine.

On 26 July 2024 Bulgakov was arrested on charges of corruption by the FSB and sent to Lefortovo prison in Moscow.

=== Sanctions ===
In September 2015, Bulgakov was included in the sanctions list during the military involvement of Ukraine.

He was sanctioned by the UK government in 2022 in relation to the Russo-Ukrainian War.

== Awards ==
- Hero of the Russian Federation (2016)
- Doctor of Economic Sciences

== Education ==
He is a member of the Academy of Military Science of Russia, the Corresponding Member of the Academy of Humanities, and a professor of the Academy of Security, Defense and Law Enforcement Problems.

== See also ==
- List of Heroes of the Russian Federation
