= Alexey Kuzmenkov =

Russian military commander

Colonel General Alexey Kuzmenkov
- Алексей Михайлович Кузьменков
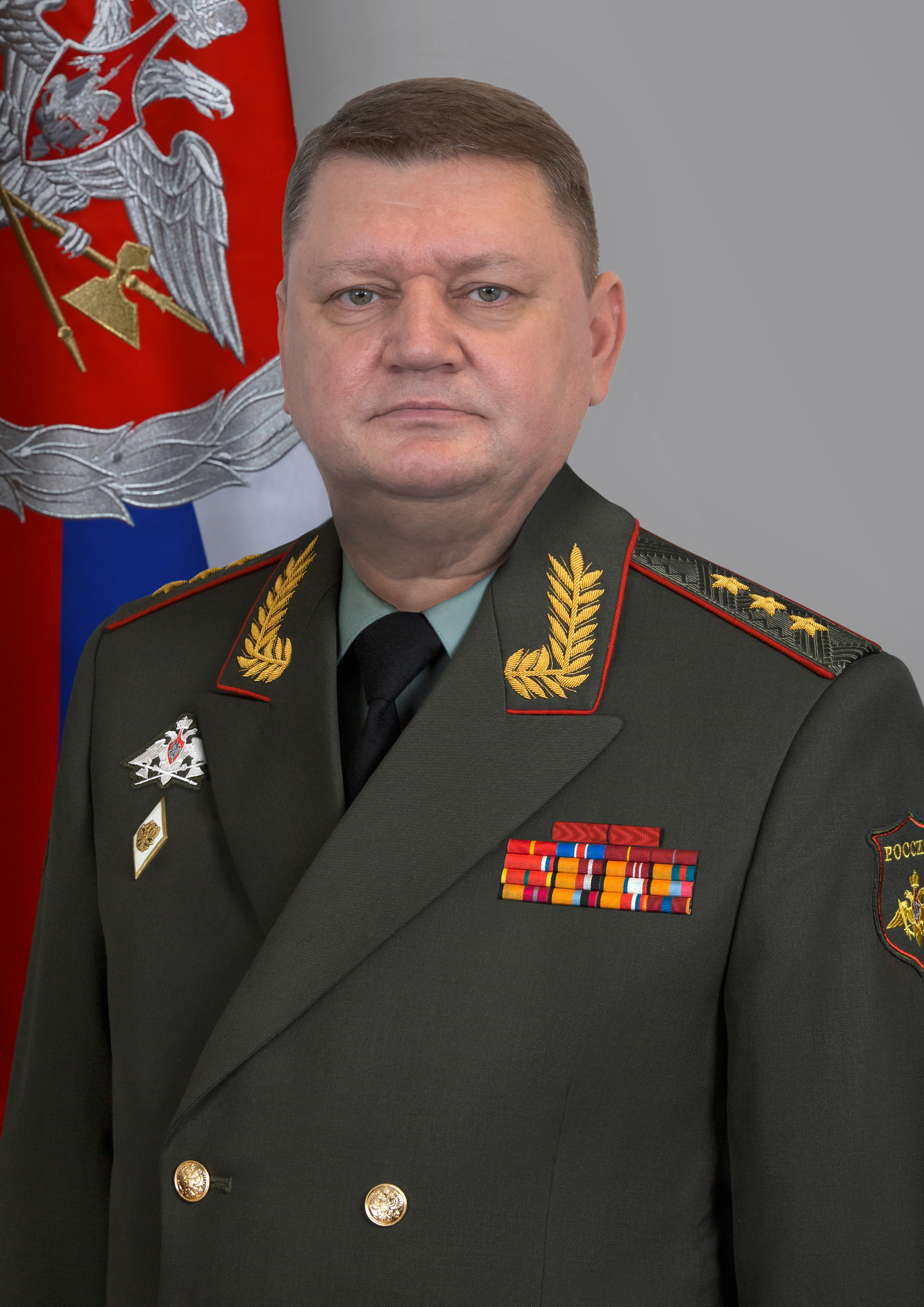
- Born: 10 June 1971 (age 55); Horlivka, Donetsk Oblast, Ukrainian Soviet Socialist Republic, Soviet Union (now Ukraine)
- Military career
- Allegiance: Russia
- Service years: 1998–present (Russia)
- Rank: Colonel general

Alexey Mikhailovich Kuzmenkov (Russian: Алексей Михайлович Кузьменков; born 10 June 1971) is a Russian colonel general who was appointed the deputy minister of defence of Russia for logistics on 30 April 2023. Prior to this, he was deputy director of the National Guard of Russia (Rosgvardia).

== Military career ==
Kuzmenkov was born 10 June 1971 in Horlivka, Donetsk Oblast in what was then the Ukrainian Soviet Socialist Republic of the Soviet Union. He began his military career in 1998, joining the Russian Ground Forces, and graduated from the Volsk Higher School of Logistics.

In 2011, he was appointed Deputy Head of the Resource Support Department in the Ministry of Defence. The following year he was appointed Head of the ministry's Planning and Logistics Coordination Department.

In 2014, he was appointed Chief of the Logistics Staff of the Russian Armed Forces.

He was named Deputy Commander of the Forces of the Southern Military District for Material and Technical Supply in 2018.

Kuzmenkov became deputy director of the National Guard of Russia in September 2019.

On 30 April 2023, Western media sources reported that Kuzmenkov had been appointed deputy minister of defence for logistics, replacing Colonel General Mikhail Mizintsev. He thus headed the Materiel-Technical Support of the Armed Forces.

== Awards ==
Kuzmenkov has been awarded the Order "For Merit to the Fatherland", 4th class; the Order of Alexander Nevsky; the medal of the Order "For Merit to the Fatherland", 1st class; and the medal of the Order "For Merit to the Fatherland", 2nd class.

== Sanctions ==
The European Union sanctioned Kuzmenkov on 21 July 2022 for his role in the Russian invasion of Ukraine.

Belgium sanctioned Kuzmenkov on 21 July 2022 for his role in the Russian invasion of Ukraine.

France sanctioned Kuzmenkov on 21 July 2022 for his role in the Russian invasion of Ukraine.

Switzerland sanctioned Kuzmenkov on 29 July 2022 for his role in the Russian invasion of Ukraine.

Japan sanctioned Kuzmenkov on 7 October 2022 for his role in the Russian invasion of Ukraine.

New Zealand sanctioned Kuzmenkov on 31 March 2023 for his role in the Russian invasion of Ukraine.
