= Semyon Kurkotkin =

Marshal of the Soviet Union (1917–1990)

Semyon Konstantinovich Kurkotkin
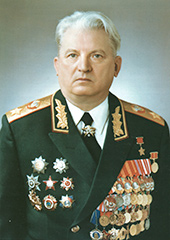
- Kurkotkin in 1972
- Born: 13 February 1917; Zaprudnaya near Ramenskoye, Bronnitsky Uyezd, Moscow Governorate, Russian Empire
- Died: 16 September 1990 (aged 73); Moscow, Russian SFSR, Soviet Union
- Burial place: Novodevichy Cemetery
- Military career
- Allegiance: Soviet Union
- Branch: Red Army (Soviet Army from 1946)
- Service years: 1937–1990
- Rank: Marshal of the Soviet Union
- Commands: 5th Guards Tank Army; 2nd Guards Tank Army; 3rd Army; Transcaucasian Military District; Group of Soviet Forces in Germany; Rear Services of the Soviet Armed Forces
- Conflicts: World War II
- Awards: Hero of the Soviet Union

Semyon Konstantinovich Kurkotkin (Russian: Семё́н Константи́нович Курко́ткин; 13 February 1917 – 16 September 1990) was a Soviet military commander and a Marshal of the Soviet Union.

Born near Moscow, Kurkotkin attended a technical college in the capital before joining the Red Army in 1937. He graduated from a tank school and began his career as a political officer in armored units. After political officers were stripped of command responsibility in late 1942 Kurkotkin became a battalion commander, rising to second-in-command of a brigade in late 1943. After his superior was killed, he became acting commander of a brigade of the 4th Guards Tank Corps, which he led in the fighting in western Ukraine during the winter of 1943–1944. As a result of his performance, Kurkotkin was selected for permanent brigade command in late 1944, leading another brigade of the corps in the advance into Germany in 1945.

After the war Kurkotkin graduated from the Military Academy for Armored and Mechanized Forces and became a tank division commander in 1951. He graduated from the Military Academy of the General Staff in 1958, and a succession of corps and army commands followed before Kurkotkin became first deputy commander-in-chief of the Group of Soviet Forces in Germany, and commander-in-chief of the Transcaucasus Military District and the Group of Soviet Forces in Germany during the late 1960s and early 1970s. Kurkotkin was appointed chief of the Rear Services of the Soviet Armed Forces in 1972, a position he held until his retirement in 1988. He received the title Hero of the Soviet Union in 1981 and became a Marshal of the Soviet Union in 1983.

== Early life and prewar service ==
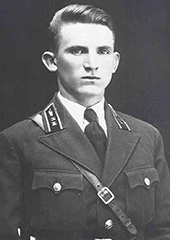
Kurkotkin, c. 1940

Kurkotkin was born on 13 February 1917 to a peasant family in the village of Zaprudnaya, Sofinskoy volost, Bronnitsky Uyezd, Moscow Governorate. He graduated from the Moscow Industrial-Pedagogical Technical College in 1936. Kurkotkin joined the Red Army in 1937, becoming a cadet at the Oryol Tank School in September of that year. Upon his graduation in 1939, he served at the school as a company political officer, and in July 1940 was sent to serve in the same position with the 50th Light Tank Brigade in the Transbaikal Military District. In 1941, he graduated from the Military-Political School in Chita.

== World War II ==
After the beginning of Operation Barbarossa in June 1941, Kurkotkin was appointed political instructor of a tank company of the 148th Separate Reconnaissance Battalion of the 114th Rifle Division in the Transbaikal District in August. In September his unit wes sent west to serve with the 7th Separate Army on the Svir River, fighting against Finnish troops in the Continuation War. In early 1942 Kurkotkin was sent to study at the Retraining Courses for Military Commissars of Tank Units in Gorky, and after completing the course became military commissar of the 475th Separate Heavy Tank Battalion of the Voronezh Front in May 1942. He became commander of the battalion in October after political officers were stripped of command responsibility and in December transferred to serve as the deputy commander of the 262nd Separate Breakthrough Tank Regiment. He graduated from Academic Officer Improvement Courses at the Military Academy of Mechanization and Motorization in 1943 and in October of that year became deputy commander of the 14th Guards Tank Brigade of the 4th Guards Tank Corps of the 1st Ukrainian Front, fighting in the Battle of the Dnieper.

When the brigade commander was killed in fighting for the city of Malin, Kurkotkin took command and for two days held a defensive line on the outskirts of the city in the area of the Chepovichi station, repulsing German attacks. During the Zhitomir–Berdichev Offensive in December, Kurkotkin led the brigade in the advance to Volodarsk and distinguished himself in the defeat of the German troops around Zhitomir. In the subsequent Rovno–Lutsk Offensive in February 1944, Kurkotkin continued as acting brigade commander in the fighting for the city of Shepetovka, in which it broke through the German defenses in conjunction with the infantry of the 18th Rifle Corps, isolating the city garrison, and prevented the German reserves from relieving the garrison. For his leadership of the brigade, Kurkotkin, by then a major, was awarded the Order of the Patriotic War, 1st class, on 18 May 1944.

After Lieutenant Colonel Alexander Skidanov arrived to take command of the brigade, Kurkotkin continued serving as its deputy commander, participating in the Proskurov–Chernovitsy Offensive and the Lvov–Sandomierz Offensive. After the end of the latter, Skidanov recommended Kurkotin for the award of the Order of the Red Banner, which the latter received on 7 October, noting that Kurkotin "directly supervised combat training" in preparation for the Lvov–Sandomierz Offensive and in the offensive "proved himself to be a brave, courageous, and resourceful commander" by "directly organizing the fulfillment of orders."

Kurkotkin became commander of the 13th Guards Tank Brigade of the corps in November, leading it in the Lower Silesian, Upper Silesian, Berlin, and Prague Offensives in the final months of the war in 1945. For his "skillful command" of the brigade, Kurkotkin, by then a lieutenant colonel, was awarded the Order of Kutuzov, 2nd class, on 6 April, and the Order of Bogdan Khmelnitsky, 2nd class, on 6 May.

== Cold War ==
After the end of the war, Kurkotkin continued to command the brigade, which was reorganized as the 13th Guards Tank Regiment when the corps became the 4th Guards Tank Division in May 1945. After graduating from the Military Academy for Armored and Mechanized Forces in 1951, Kurkotkin, promoted to colonel on 20 April 1950, became deputy commander of the 10th Guards Tank Division in May of that year. He became commander of the division before studying at the Special Faculty of the Military Academy of the General Staff. After graduating from the latter in October 1958, Kurkotkin, promoted to major general of tank forces on 3 May 1955, was appointed commander of the 6th Army Corps of the North Caucasus Military District. After becoming commander of the 5th Guards Tank Army of the Belorussian Military District in June 1960, Kurkotkin, promoted to lieutenant general of tank forces on 22 February 1963, was sent to the Group of Soviet Forces in Germany (GSFG) to command the 2nd Guards Tank Army, and became commander of the 3rd Army of the GSFG in July 1965.

Kurkotkin continued to hold increasingly senior command positions, becoming first deputy commander-in-chief of the GSFG in July 1965 and commander-in-chief of the forces of the Transcaucasian Military District in April 1968. He was promoted to colonel general on 24 February 1967. After graduating from Higher Academic Courses at the Military Academy of the General Staff in 1970, he became commander-in-chief of the GSFG in September 1971, and Chief of the Rear Services of the Soviet Armed Forces in July 1972. In the latter capacity, he also served as a deputy minister of defense, and was soon promoted to army general on 3 November 1972. In recognition of his "contributions to the training and combat readiness of forces" and "personal courage and bravery" during World War II, Kurkotkin was made a Hero of the Soviet Union on 18 February 1981. Promoted to the rank of Marshal of the Soviet union on 25 March 1983, he became a general-inspector of the Group of Inspectors General, a retirement position for senior officers, on 3 May 1988. Kurkotkin died in Moscow on 16 September 1990. He is buried at the Novodevichy Cemetery.

== Honours and awards ==
Kurkotkin was a recipient of the following Soviet awards and decorations:

- Hero of the Soviet Union (18 February 1981)
- Order of Lenin (31 October 1967, 11 February 1977, 18 February 1981, 19 February 1986)
- Order of the October Revolution (May 1972)
- Order of Red Banner (19 February 1942, 31 January 1943, 7 October 1944)
- Order of Kutuzov, 2nd class (April 1945)
- Order of Bogdan Khmelnitsky, 2nd class (May 1945)
- Order of the Patriotic War, 1st class (18 May 1944, 6 April 1985)
- Order of the Red Star (20 April 1953)
- Order for Service to the Homeland in the Armed Forces of the USSR, 3rd class
- Medal "For Distinction in Guarding the State Border of the USSR"
- Medal "For the Liberation of Prague"
- Medal "For Strengthening Military Cooperation"

Foreign awards

- Order of Sukhbaatar (Mongolia)
- Order of the Red Banner (Mongolia)
- Patriotic Order of Merit, 1st class (GDR)
- Commander of the Order of Polonia Restituta (Poland)
- Cross of Valour (Poland)
- Czechoslovak Order of the Red Banner
- Scharnhorst Order, twice (GDR)
- Order of Tudor Vladimirescu, 1st class (Romania)

Kurkotkin was a member of the Central Committee of the Communist Party of the Soviet Union between 1976 and 1989, a deputy of the Soviet of Nationalities from its 8th to 11th convocations, and a delegate of the 22nd, 23rd, 24th, and 25th party congresses.
