= Rear services =

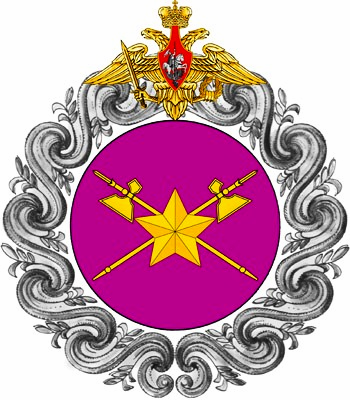
The great emblem of the Rear Services of the Russian Armed Forces instituted on December 31, 2004.

Rear services were those agencies in Warsaw Pact and Soviet style military forces concerned with military logistics and support. The Rear Services supplied the armed forces with ammunition, fuel, spare parts, food, clothing, and other material. They included the Central Military Medical Administration. Usually a deputy minister of defence served as chief of Rear Services for the armed forces. Rear Services encompasses mainly the Rear Services' Staff, several main and central departments and other services.

== Structure ==
Major departments were:

1. Military Transportation which was the primary traffic management organization for the armed forces and was responsible for coordinating and planning supply movements by all means of transport.
2. Food Supply which both procured food from civilian agricultural enterprises and operated a military state farm system to supply troops, particularly those serving in remote areas.
3. Clothing Supply usually had its own clothing factories to manufacture uniforms and specialized gear.
4. The main and central directorates operated post exchange, health care, and recreational facilities for military personnel. The Rear Services also provided financial reports on armed forces activities to party and government organs.
5. The chief of the Rear Services commanded the Railway Troops, Road Troops (ru:Дорожные войска), Pipeline Troops, and Automotive Troops. The mission of these supporting service was to construct and maintain the military transport infrastructure. Automotive Troops trained and provided the drivers and mechanics needed to maintain and drive cargo trucks loaded with supplies from railheads to operational units in the field. Railway Troops, Road Troops, and Pipeline Troops built permanent rail lines, roads, and pipelines between the supply points and units in the field.
6. Formerly divided among independent maintenance, medical, and motor transport companies, the provision of rear services in Soviet and some Warsaw Pact regiments had become the responsibility of unified matériel support units. As in most armies, these matériel support units were subordinate to operational commanders, although they worked with the next highest chief of rear services on technical matters.
7. Traffic Regulators, were generally non-military police military personnel who directed traffic through temporary traffic control zones using signs or flags. They were responsible for maintaining the safety and efficiency of traffic, as well as the safety of road workers, while allowing construction, accident recovery or other tasks to proceed. They used signal flags, hand signals, signalling batons, traffic cones, and warning signs to control traffic movement.

In 1984 main components included food supply, fuel supply, Central Military Medical Administration, Clothing Supply, Main Administration of Trade (Voyentorg, military stores & military post exchanges), Rear Cadres (personnel), Railway Troops, Pipeline Troops, Central Administration of Military Communications (VOSO), veterinarian, Motortransport Service (provides vehicles while Automotive Troops provides drivers), Highway Directorate, Chief, Tourism and Excursion Administration, and the Tyl Political Section. The last five departments were all headed by general-majors. Later the agricultural department was separated from food supply. The Rear Services also included the Topographic Troops (ru:Трубопроводные войска).

On the dissolution of the Soviet Union much of the former Soviet component became the Rear Services of the Armed Forces of Russia.

== Chiefs of the Rear Services ==
1941-1951	General of the Army	Andrey Khrulyov
1951-1958	Colonel General	Vasili Vinogradov
1958-1968	Marshal of the Soviet Union	Ivan Bagramyan
1968-1972	General of the Army	Sergei Maryakhin (ru:Маряхин, Сергей Степанович)
1972-1988	Marshal of the Soviet Union	Semyon Kurkotkin
1988-1991	General of the Army	Vladimir Arkhipov
07.12.1991—18.07.1992	Colonel General	Ivan Fuzhenko (ru:Фуженко,_Иван_Васильевич)
18.07.1992—16.06.1997	Colonel General	Vladimir Churanov (ru:Чуранов, Владимир Тимофеевич) (first full-term Russian Tyl Chief)
