= Limited Contingent of Soviet Forces in Afghanistan =

- Ограниченный контингент советских войск в Афганистан
- Active: 1979–1989
- Country: Soviet Union
- Branch: Soviet Armed Forces
- Type: Group of forces
- Size: 120,000 people (at height)
- Part of: Turkestan Military District
- Garrison/HQ: Democratic Republic of Afghanistan
- Engagements: Soviet–Afghan War

The Limited Contingent of Soviet Forces in Afghanistan (Russian: Ограниченный контингент советских войск в Афганистане) was the official name of the group of the Soviet Armed Forces in the Democratic Republic of Afghanistan from 1979–1989 during the Soviet–Afghan War. It was subordinated to the Turkestan Military District based in Tashkent, Uzbek SSR. The Limited Contingent of Soviet Troops in Afghanistan was formed on the basis of the Army Headquarters of the 40th Army of the Soviet Ground Forces.

== Number of personnel involved ==
Year	Total number	Including military personnel
1980	65,471	63,997
1981	81,894	79,828
1982	87,694	85,697
1983	90 936	88,900
1984	92,983	90 703
1985	99 904	97,344
1986	108,789	105,977
1987	101,900	99,069
1988	102 187	99 233
1989	66,742	64,716

== Composition ==
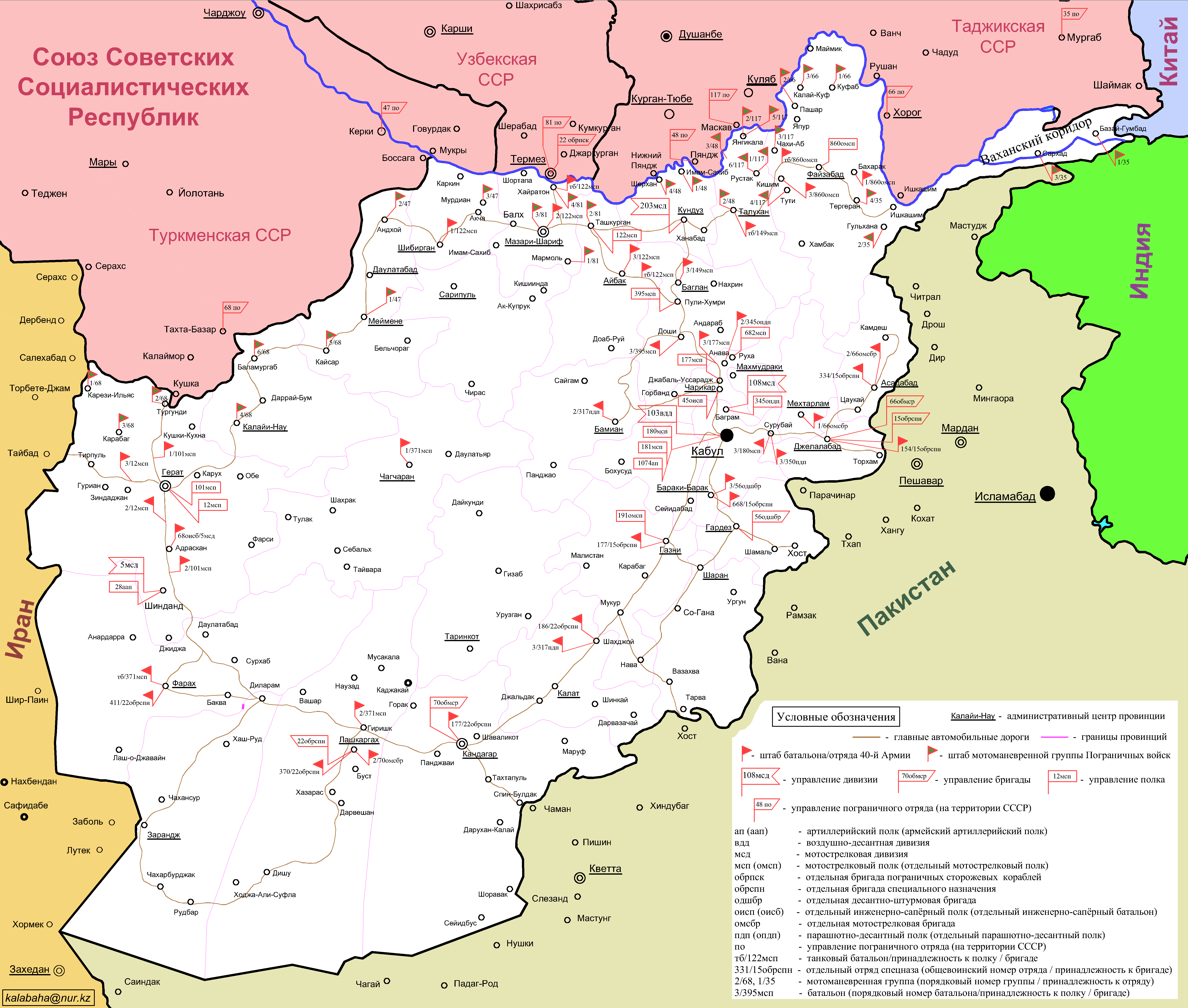
Garrisons of the Limited Contingent of Soviet Forces in Afghanistan as of early 1987.

=== Ministry of Defense ===
- Operational Group of the Ministry of Defense
- Office of the Chief Military Advisor

==== 40th Army of the Turkestan Military District ====
===== Independent Units =====
- 5th Guards Motor Rifle Zimovniki Division in Kushka
  - 101st Motor Rifle Regiment
  - 12th Guard Motor Rifle Regiment
  - 371st Guards Motor Rifle Regiment
  - 373rd Guards Motor Rifle Regiment
  - 24th Guards Tank Regiment
  - 1060th Artillery Regiment
  - 1008th Anti-Aircraft Artillery Regiment
  - 1122nd Anti-Aircraft Rocket Regiment
- 108th Motor Rifle Nevel Division in Termez
  - 177th Motor Rifle Dvina Regiment
  - 180th Motor Rifle Regiment
  - 181st Motor Rifle Regiment
  - 186th Motor Rifle Regiment
  - 285th Tank Regiment
  - 682nd Motor Rifle Regiment
  - 1074th Artillery Regiment
  - 1049th Artillery Regiment
  - 1415th Missile Regiment
- 353rd Gun Artillery Brigade
- 2nd Anti-Aircraft Missile Brigade
- 56th Guards Air Assault Brigade
- 103rd Communications Regiment
- 28th Rocket Artillery Regiment
- 58th Motor Rifle Division (reserve)
- 103rd Guards Airborne Division
  - 317th Airborne Regiment
  - 350th Airborne Regiment
  - 357th Airborne Regiment
  - 1179th Artillery Regiment
- 345th Independent Guards Airborne Regiment

===== Army Air Force =====
The army's air forces were represented by the 34th Mixed Aviation Corps (Russian: 34-го смешанного авиакорпуса), later renamed the Air Force of the 40th Combined Arms Army .

===== Specialized units (combat support) =====
- 103rd Separate Communications Regiment
- 1996th Separate Radiotechnical Air Defense Battalion
- 254th Separate Special Purpose Radiotechnical Regiment
- 45th Separate Engineer-Sapper Regiment
  - 19th Separate Engineer Battalion
  - 92nd Separate Engineering Road Battalion
  - 1117th Separate Special Mining Engineering Battalion
  - 2088th Separate Engineering Obstruction Battalion

===== Specialized units (logistical support) =====
- 692nd Separate Road Battalion
- 159th Road Construction Brigade
- 58th Automotive Brigade
- 59th Logistics Brigade
- 14th Separate Pipeline Battalion
- 276th Pipeline Brigade
- 1461st Separate Pipeline Battalion
- 278th Road Commandant Brigade, Road Troops
  - 692nd Separate Road Commandant Battalion
  - 1083rd Separate Road Commandant Battalion
  - 1084th Separate Road Commandant Battalion
- 194th Guards Military Transport Aviation Regiment
- 128th Guards Military Transport Aviation Regiment
- 930th Military Transport Aviation Regiment
- 50th Separate Mixed Aviation Regiment
- 111th Separate Mixed Aviation Regiment
- 342nd Engineering Directorate
  - 2017th Separate Construction and Assembly Battalion
  - 2018th Separate Construction and Assembly Battalion
  - 2137th Separate Construction and Assembly Battalion
  - 1110th Separate Military Construction Battalion
  - 1112th Separate Military Construction Battalion
  - 1630th Separate Military Construction Battalion
  - 1705th Separate Military Construction Battalion
  - 1707th Separate Military Construction Battalion
  - 1708th Separate Military Construction Battalion
  - 773rd Separate Military Construction Company
  - 774th Separate Military Construction Company
- 3704th Artillery Warehouse

=== KGB of the USSR ===
- Central Asian Border District Operational Group

==== Special units ====
- Special Purpose Group "Zenit-1"
- Special Purpose Group "Zenit-2"
- Special Purpose Group "Thunder"
- Operational Reconnaissance Combat Detachment "Cascade"
- Afghanistan Training Center (Detachment "Omega")
- Alpha Group

==== Government Communications Troops ====
- 311th Separate Linear Station Battalion

==== Border Troops of the KGB ====
===== Ground forces =====
- Maneuverable Groups and Airborne Assault Maneuver Groups of the Central Asian Border District
- Maneuverable Groups and Airborne Assault Maneuver Groups of the Eastern Border District
- Separate Special Commandant's Office
  - Separate Commandant's Company

Stationed in Kabul and tasked with protecting the embassy and all Soviet missions and institutions. It was the only KGB Border Troops unit within the OKSVA that was not located in the border zone of responsibility.

===== Aviation units =====
- 10th Separate Border Aviation Regiment, Eastern Border District (Burundai, Kazakh SSR)
- 17th Separate Border Aviation Regiment, Central Asian Border District (Mary, Turkmen SSR)
- 23rd Separate Border Aviation Regiment, Central Asian Border District (Usharal, Tajik SSR)
- 22nd Separate Border Aviation Regiment, Eastern Border District (Burundai, Kazakh SSR)

===== River units =====
- 45th Separate Patrol Ship Division

=== Ministry of Internal Affairs ===
- Special Forces Unit "Cobalt"

== Leadership ==
=== Leaders of the Operational Group of the Ministry of Defense ===
- Marshal of the Soviet Union Sergei Sokolov (1979–1985)
- General of the Army Valentin Varennikov (1985–1989)

=== Chief Military Advisors and Senior Military Specialist Group Leaders in the Afghan Armed Forces ===
- Lieutenant General Lev Gorelov (1975-1979)
- Colonel General Saltan Magometov (1979-1980)
- Army General Alexander Mayorov (1980-1981)
- Army General Mikhail Sorokin (1981 - 1984)
- Army General Grigory Salmanov (1984 - 1986)
- Colonel General Vladimir Vostrov (1986 - 1988)
- Colonel General Mikhail Sotskov (1988 - 1989)
- Army General Makhmut Gareev (military adviser to Mohammad Najibullah) (1989-1990)
- Colonel General Boris Shein (1989-1990)
- Army General Nikolai Grachev (1990 - 1991)
- Lieutenant General Boris Perfilyev (1991 - 1992)

=== Commanders of the 40th Army ===
- Lieutenant General Yuri Tukharinov (May 1979 – 23 September 1980)
- Lieutenant General Boris Tkach (23 September 1980 – 7 May 1982)
- Lieutenant General Viktor Ermakov (7 May 1982 – 4 November 1983)
- Lieutenant General Leonid Generalov (4 November 1983 – 19 April 1985)
- Lieutenant General Igor Rodionov (19 April 1985 – 30 April 1986)
- Lieutenant General Viktor Dubynin (30 April 1986 – 1 June 1987)
- Lieutenant General Boris Gromov (1 June 1987 – 15 February 1989)

== See also ==
- International Security Assistance Force
- Group of Soviet Forces in Germany
