= Averinskaya, Yaroslavl Oblast =

Averinskaya Аверинская
- Selo
- Location within Yaroslavl Oblast Location within Russia
- Coordinates: 57.2591°N 38.3339°E
- Country: Russia
- Region: Yaroslavl Oblast
- District: Uglichsky District
- Time zone: UTC+3:00

Averinskaya (Russian: Аве́ринская) is a rural locality (a village) in Ilinskoye Rural Settlement of Uglichsky District, in Yaroslavl Oblast, Russia. Population: 5 (2010 census); 3 (2002 census);
