= Road Troops =

- Дорожные войска России; Dorozhnye voyska Rossii
- Emblem

Agency overview
- Formed: 23 September 1812
- Headquarters: Moscow
- Agency executive: Director
- Parent agency: Logistical Support of the Russian Armed Forces
- Website: Ministry of Defense Website

Road Troops of Russia (Russian: Дорожные войска России) are special troops within the Logistical Support of the Russian Armed Forces (until 2010, within the Rear of the Russian Armed Forces), including road commandant units and formations, bridge, pontoon-bridge, as well as road units and subdivisions designed to perform road support tasks.

In Russia, until 2017, there were also road construction units (since 1996, officially called road construction military formations), which were outside the norms for the number of members of the Russian Armed Forces, and were part of:

- From 1992 to 1997 - one of the central governing bodies of the Ministry of Defense of the Russian Federation, and then a state institution under this ministry (TsDSU of the Ministry of Defense of Russia, then FDSU under the Ministry of Defense of Russia);
- From 1997 to 2017 - part of federal executive bodies that carried out activities in the field of road construction, in the interests of defense and security of the state (Rospetsstroy, then Spetsstroy of Russia).

Currently, the main composition of the formations, units and subdivisions of the road troops, their institutions, establishments, enterprises and organizations are part of the Russian Armed Forces. Also, road construction military units are part of the Military Construction Complex of the Ministry of Defense of the Russian Federation (MCC of the Ministry of Defense of Russia).

In peacetime, road troops construct and restore highways, bridges over large water obstacles, protection, security and defence of road facilities, as well as are tasked to eliminate the consequences of emergency situations. The professional holiday "Day of Military Road Workers" in Russia is September 23. This is the day of the creation of five pioneer companies and a mounted team to carry out military road work in the interests of the active army during the French Invasion of Russia on September 23, 1812, according to the order of the Commander-in-Chief of the troops, Field Marshal Mikhail Kutuzov. This order marked the beginning of the creation of the road service as a separate structure in the Imperial Russian Army.

== History ==
=== Russian Empire ===
They appeared in the Imperial Russian Army at the beginning of the 18th century to provide road support for troops. In 1724, in Saint Petersburg, on the basis of the United Engineering School, the training of specialists in road and bridge works was started. Due to the weak development of the AD network, in 1884 the construction of automobile (highway) roads was entrusted to the Ministry of War. Thanks to its efforts, from 1885 to 1900, the highways Saint Petersburg - Pskov - Warsaw with branches to Riga and Mariupol, Moscow - Brest - Warsaw with branches to Kalisz and Poznań, Kyiv - Brest, the Pskov - Kyiv and some others were built.

On March 8, 1915, in order to improve road support for troops in defensive operations, the Supreme Commander-in-Chief issued an order to form military road detachments and rear detachments of military road works. Initially, they were formed only for the armies of the Southwestern Front, one military road detachment for each army, and 18 rear detachments of military road works to carry out military road works in the rear of the front. Military road and rear detachments of military road works were headed by military engineers and divided into working companies. Later, other units were formed.

=== Soviet period ===
In 1930, by resolution of the Council of People's Commissars of the Soviet Union and the Central Committee of the Communist Party of the Soviet Union, automobile and road institutes were organized in five cities of the Soviet Union in the TsUDorTrans NKPS USSR system: in Moscow (MADI), Leningrad (LADI), Saratov (SADI), Kharkov (KhaDI) and Omsk (SibADI) to train highly qualified road engineers, bridge builders, mechanics and motorists. At the same time, the universities had to solve an equally important task, to prepare reserve officers for the special forces of the Soviet Armed Forces at their military departments, since the profiles of training civilian specialists, according to which training was carried out in the road institutes, completely coincided with their military registration specialties.

By the Decree of the Council of Labor and Defense of December 11, 1933, the Directorate of Road Construction of Eastern Siberia and the Far East (Daldorstroy) was created in the city of Khabarovsk, with the task of constructing strategic highways according to the list of the government of the USSR, in the regions of Eastern Siberia and the Far East of the USSR. The construction plans were announced at the 17th Congress of the All-Union Communist Party (Bolsheviks), held in Moscow from January 26 to February 10, 1934, when the second five-year plan for the development of the Soviet Union was adopted. In accordance with it, it was planned to build a Vladivostok-Khabarovsk highway, with a hard (gravel) surface, 600 kilometers long. For Daldorstroy, the Red Army formed two brigades of road troops from December 1933 to January 1934: the first in the city of Rostov-on-Don, headed by brigade commander N. M. Anisimov, and the second in the city of Kyiv (brigade commander Lebedev), with a total number of personnel of about 15,000 people, and redeployed them to the Russian Far East. The headquarters of the first brigade was the village of Dmitrievka in the Primorsky Krai, the second in the city of Khabarovsk. The first brigade carried out construction from Vladivostok to Iman, and the second from Iman to Khabarovsk.

==== World War II ====
The difficulties associated with transport support for military operations in the initial period of the war required the country's leadership to take emergency measures. On July 15, 1941, the State Defense Committee adopted Resolution No. 163 "On the organization of road service on highways and dirt roads and the formation of motor transport battalions." According to this resolution, additional automobile and road units and formations were formed, ten military automobile roads (MAD) of the Supreme Highway Headquarters were deployed. To manage the motor transport and road support, the Automobile and Road Directorate of the Red Army was created, which was transferred from the General Staff to the jurisdiction of the Red Army Rear. The further strengthening of the role of motor transport and road support in the offensive operations of the Red Army determined the need to reorganize the Main Directorate of Motor Transport and Road Service. By the State Defense Committee Resolution No. 3544 of June 9, 1943, the Main Road Directorate of the Red Army was created, and the motor transport department was included in the created Main Automobile Directorate of the Rear of the Red Army with the corresponding structures in the fronts, armies and military districts. Not a single operation during the Great Patriotic War was prepared or carried out without the participation of specialists from the motor transport and road services, soldiers of the motor and road formations and units. According to the decree of the State Defense Committee of the USSR dated January 16, 1942, it was prescribed to form separate road-construction battalions (RDB) with a personnel strength of 477 people in the Military districts of the Soviet Union: Moscow - 8 RDB, Volga - 6 RDB, Central Asian - 8 RDB, Siberian - 3 RDB, Ural - 4 RDB, South Ural - 3 RDB, Transcaucasian - 6 RDB, and separate bridge-building battalions (OBB) with a personnel strength of 501 people in the military districts: Moscow - 4 RDB, Arkhangelsk - 2 RDB, Volga - 2 RDB, Central Asian - 2 RDB, Siberian - 1 RDB, Ural - 2 RDB, South Ural - 1st Motorized Infantry Brigade, Transcaucasian - 10th Motorized Infantry Brigade.

On November 12, 1943, by Order of the People's Commissariat of Defense of the Soviet Union No. 310, an emblem of the road troops was introduced, consisting of a symmetrically intersecting axe and shovel (for the command staff - silver-plated, for the engineering and technical staff - gilded, for cadets of military schools, as well as sergeants and privates - brass). Subsequently, on June 23, 1955, by Order of the Minister of Defense of the USSR No. 104, a common emblem was introduced for the automobile and road troops (previously the emblem of only the automobile troops), and from that period it became a common emblem for these branches of the armed forces until 1988.

In total, there were 400,000 road troops at the front. During the Great Patriotic War, they restored, repaired and built about 100,000 kilometers of roads, over 1,000,000 linear meters of bridges, prepared and delivered over 20,000,000 cubic meters of sand and stone for road construction. The total length of military roads maintained by road troops was 359,000 kilometers. For exemplary performance of command assignments, 59 road troops units were awarded orders, 27 of them received honorary titles, over 21,000 soldiers were awarded orders and medals.

==== Post-war ====
After the end of the war, a decision was made to reduce the road troops of the Soviet Armed Forces. In 1945, by decision of the State Defense Committee, a road construction unit was created from the reduced formations and units — the Special Road Construction Corps of the NKVD of the USSR, consisting of four road construction divisions, for the construction and restoration of the network of the USSR AD (main highways of national importance, roads of defense importance) destroyed during the war; the basis of the corps was the road troops subject to disbandment. Two divisions participated in the construction in the territories of the Tsimlyansk hydroelectric complex, the Kuibyshev hydroelectric power station, the oil fields of Tatar ASSR and Bashkir ASSR, the mica mines of Transbaikal, the third in Rostov-on-Don and the fourth in Kharkov, built the main roads of national importance Kharkov — Rostov-on-Don, Kharkov — Simferopol and other AD. Between 1946 and 1956, he built 3,244 km of paved roads, 17 km of bridges, and laid 2.7 km of reinforced concrete pipes.

By the Resolution of the Central Committee of the CPSU and the Council of Ministers of the Soviet Union of October 23, 1970 No. 878-301 "On the construction and reconstruction of border highways in the regions of Eastern Siberia, the Far East and Central Asia" separate road construction brigades (odsbr) were created in the Main Military Construction Directorate (GVSU) of the Soviet Ministry of Defense, which were deployed and began in 1970 on sections of the construction and reconstruction of the Irkutsk-Chita road (M55) in the Transbaikal regions. Financing for the construction and reconstruction was carried out through capital investments allocated centrally once a year for these purposes by the Council of Ministers of the RSFSR. The total length of the road from Irkutsk to Chita reached 1,172 km, of which 566 km were existing sections with hard surfaces, and 606 km were to be built anew by three separate road construction brigades. Work began in 1970 on three sections:

- Baykalsk - Posolskoye, 178.5 km long;
- Mukhorshibir - Glinka, 178.5 km long;
- Bludnaya River - Cheremkhovo, 178.5 km long.

In total, 606 km of road with asphalt concrete pavement according to the standards of the 3rd technical category were built and put into operation on the Irkutsk - Chita road, while 207,000,000 rubles of capital investments were spent (in estimated prices of 1969).

The construction and reconstruction work on the Irkutsk-Chita Highway was mostly completed in 1981. During the reconstruction and construction of the Irkutsk-Chita Highway (1970-1981), on the Bludnaya River-Cheremkhovo section, a number of large excavations were developed using powerful directional blasts with up to 400 tons of explosives (HE) per blast.

Separate road construction brigades of the Main Military Construction Directorate (GVSU) of the Soviet Ministry of Defense began work on the construction of the Chita-Khabarovsk highway (Amurskaya Kolesukha) in 1977 on two sections:

- Chita-Nikolaevka-Znamenka in Zabaykalsky Krai;
- Pashkovo-Svobodny in the Amur Oblast.

Later, a decision was made to build, using three separate road construction brigades of the GVSU of the Soviet Ministry of Defense, from two directions:

- One separate road construction brigade of the GVSU of the USSR Ministry of Defense began construction on the Chita-Nikolaevka-Znamenka section from the western direction;
- One separate road construction brigade of the GVSU of the USSR Ministry of Defense began construction on the eastern section of the road in the direction of Pashkovo-Arkhara-Zavitinsk;
- One separate road construction brigade of the GVSU of the USSR Ministry of Defense began construction on the eastern section of the road in the direction of Zavitinsk-Belogorsk-Svobodny-Sivaki.
- The total length of the highway (with approaches) reached 2,283 km, of which the existing hard-surface road was 370 km. It was necessary to build 1,913 km of new capital road.

=== Russian Federation ===
Currently, the road troops of the Russian Federation consist of road commandant, road, bridge, bridge-preparing battalions of the logistics brigades, other units, institutions and organizations. Training of specialists for the road troops is carried out at the Military Logistics Academy, at military departments at seven civilian higher educational institutions of the Russian Federation.

The Road Troops of the Russian Federation performed tasks during local conflicts and counter-terrorist operations, including during the Chechen Wars. The road troops of the North Caucasus Military District, where the forces and means of the road troops included in the Joint Group for conducting the counter-terrorist operation, were very limited: units of the road commandant brigade, three road depots and road maintenance sections of the Ministry of Defense of Russia. In Chechnya, the personnel restored bridges across the Terek River in the area of the settlement of Chervlennaya, the Argun River and the Sunzha River in Petropavlovsk.

Road Troops took an active part in eliminating the consequences of floods. In 2002, road workers in the shortest possible time restored bridges across the Argun River in Shatoy and across the Kuban River on the federal highway in the city of Nevinnomyssk.

Following the 2006 Lebanon War, from October to December 2006 the 100th separate bridge battalion of the Central Air Defense Command of the Russian Ministry of Defense restored transport infrastructure in Lebanon.
