= Averinskaya, Vologda Oblast =

Averinskaya Аверинская
- Village
- Location within Vologda Oblast Location within Russia
- Coordinates: 60°12′N 41°41′E
- Country: Russia
- Region: Vologda Oblast
- District: Syamzhensky District
- Time zone: UTC+3:00

Averinskaya (Russian: Аверинская) is a rural locality (a village) in Dvinitskoye Rural Settlement, Syamzhensky District, Vologda Oblast, Russia. The population was 67 as of 2002.

== Geography ==
Averinskaya is located 60 km northeast of Syamzha (the district's administrative centre) by road. Zakharovskaya is the nearest rural locality.
