= Military Logistics Academy =

Military academy

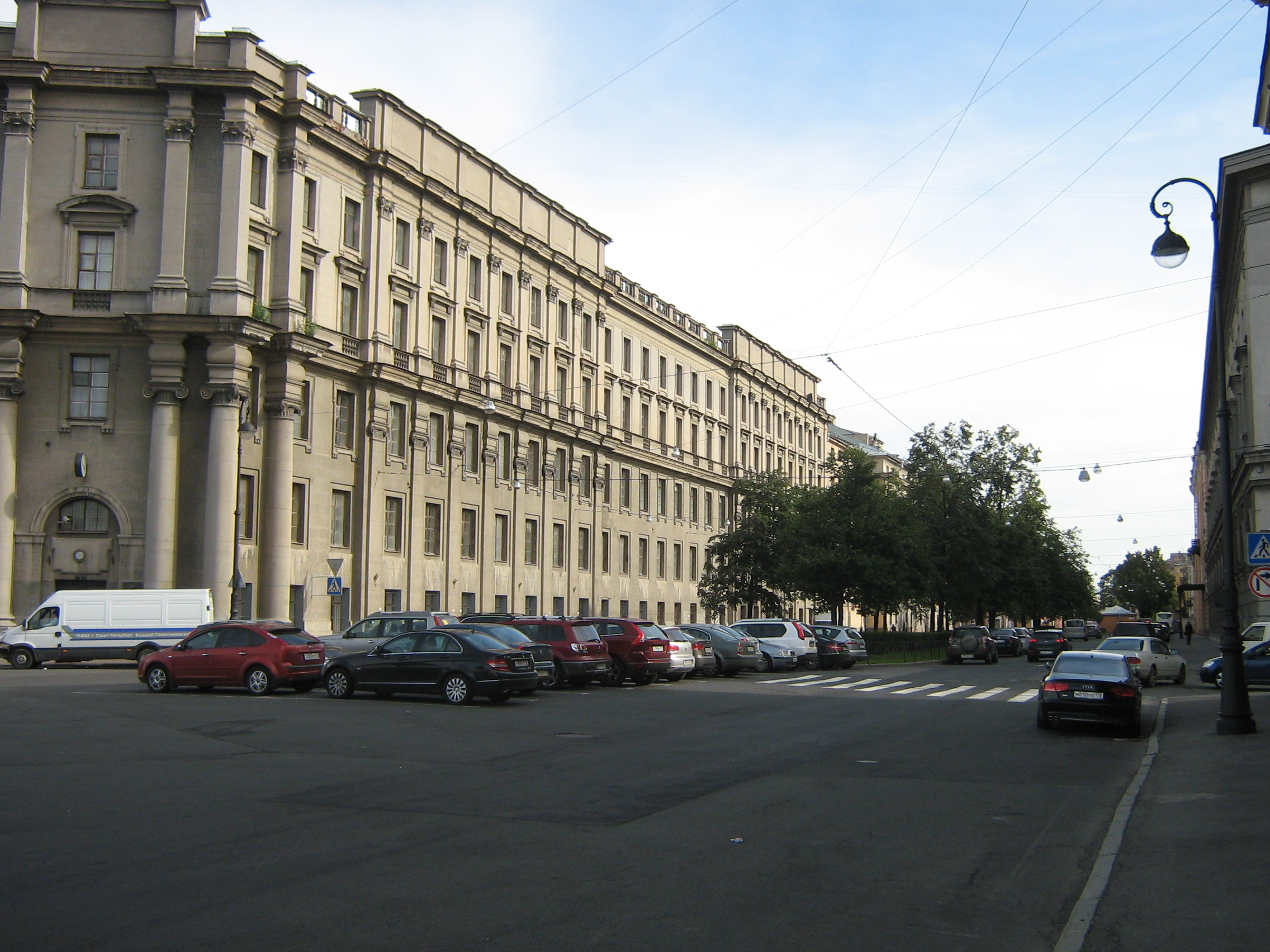
- Type: Military academy
- Established: 1918
- Location: 8 Naberezhnaya Makarova, Saint Petersburg, Russia; 59.9452301°N 30.2964209°E

The Military Logistics Academy, officially known as the Military Academy of Logistical Support "General of the Army A. V. Khrulyov" (Note: Russian: Военная академия материально-технического обеспечения имени А. В. Хрулёва, romanized: Voyennaya akademiya materialno-tekhicheskogo obespecheniya imeni A. V. Khrulyova) a subordinate school of the Russian Ground Forces, is located in the northern city Saint Petersburg. It was created in 1918. It trains officers and NCO's for the rear services and the Transportation Forces. It is currently led by Lieutenant General Andrey Toporov.

== History ==
It traces its history from the Quartermaster Course of the Imperial Russian Army, formed on 31 March 1900, when Emperor Nicholas II approved the "Regulations on the Quartermaster Course" in Petrograd. In 1918, it was reorganized into the Military Administrative Academy of the Red Army. Over 1,000 students of the academy took part in the Russian Civil War, with many serving in positions in the Eastern, Turkestan and other fronts. By the time the Great Patriotic War began, more than 13,000 qualified logistic specialists were by the academy. In early 1938, the academy was relocated to Leningrad. In 1956, it was merged with the Military Academy of Logistics and Supply into the Military Academy of Logistics and Transport. In 1998, the academy on the rights of its branches includes the Volsk Higher School of Logistics and the Ulyanovsk Higher Military Technical School. In 2008, the Volga Higher Military School of Logistics, the Ulyanovsk Higher Military Technical School of Logistics (Military Institute), and the Military Transport University of Railway Troops and Military Communications were attached to the academy as a branch.

== Structure ==
The academy has the following organization:

- Military Institute (Railway troops and military communications) of the Military Academy of Logistics
- Military Engineering University
- Volsk Branch
- Omsk Branch
- Penza Branch

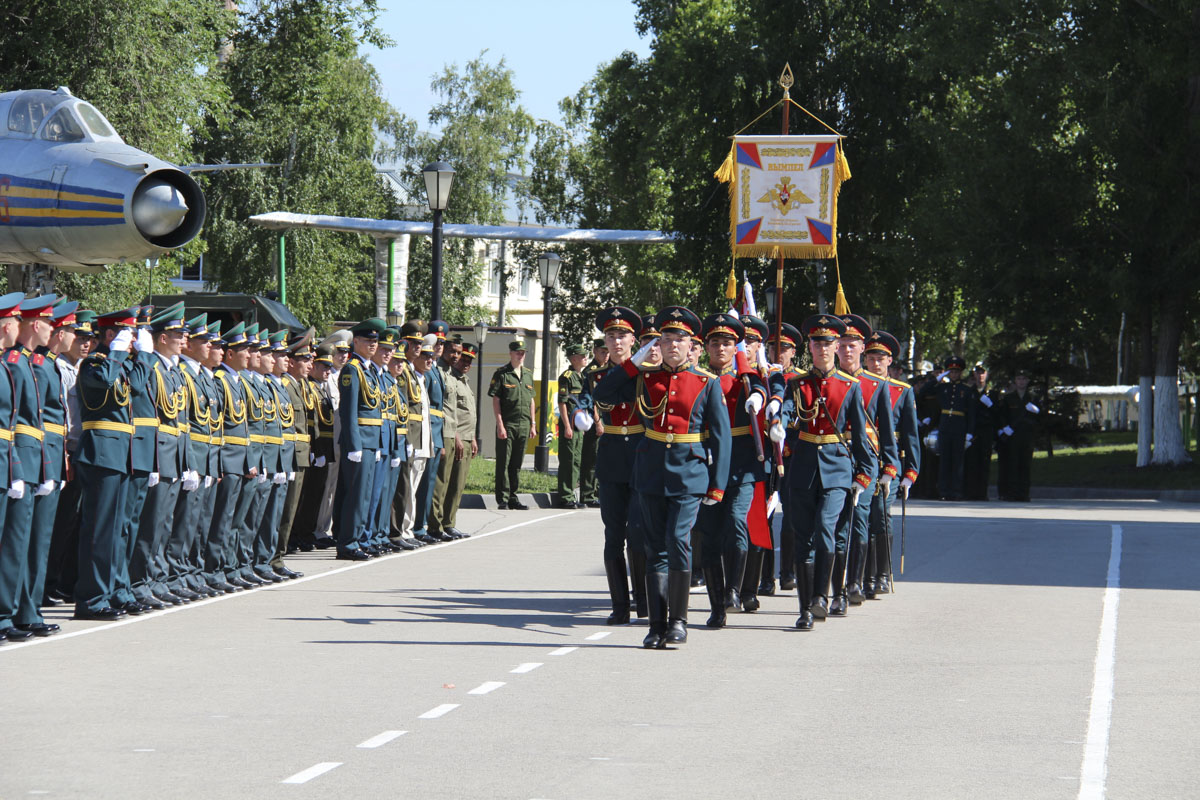
A graduation of officers in the Volsky branch in 2018.

The academy sports the following departments:

- Department of Logistical Organization
- Department of Command and Control
- Department of Logistics
- Department of the Material and Technical Organization of the Navy
- Department of Military Communications
- Department of Tactics and Operations
- Department of Railway Troops
- Department of the Construction of Military Bridges and Tunnels
- Department of Road Service
- Department of Humanitarian and Socio-economic Disciplines
- Department of General Scientific and Technical Disciplines
- Department of Physical Fitness
- Rear Department of the National Guard of Russia
- Department of Logistics of the Border Service of the Federal Security Service

== Student life ==
There are currently 1,400 students at the academy.

=== Traditions ===
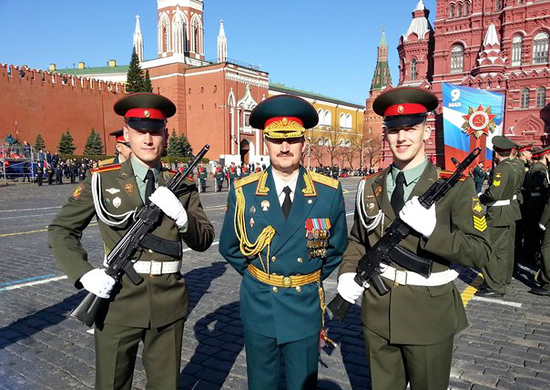
General Vladimir Ivanovsky with two academy cadets on Red Square.

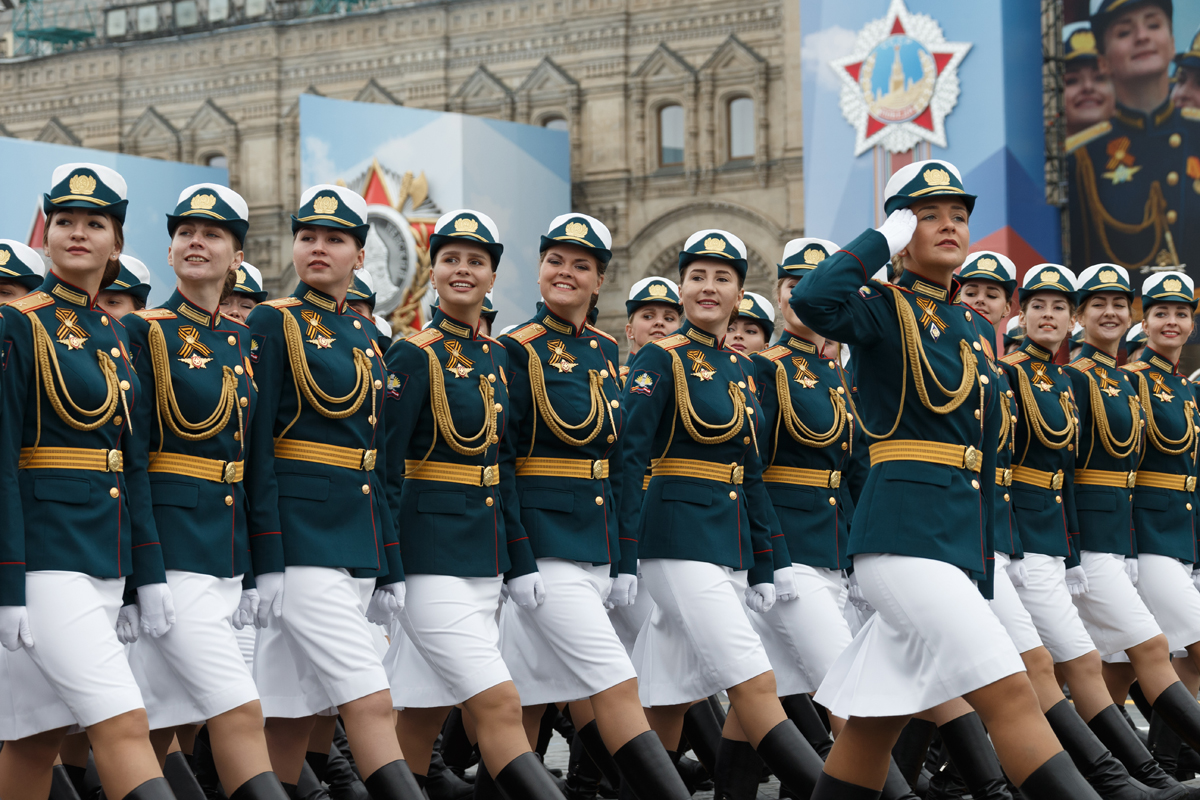
Female cadets from the Military Logistics Academy on parade.

==== Parades ====
It is an annual participant in the Moscow Victory Day Parade on Red Square. The 2016 parade, for the very first time, featured women officers and other ranks from the academy and the Military University of the Ministry of Defence of the Russian Federation. They have marched in the parade since then. During the 2020 edition of the parade, cadets led by academy commandant Andrey Toporov were dressed in the historical part of the parade in the uniforms of participants in the Moscow Victory Parade of 1945. In addition, over 100 cadets take part in the Victory Day Parade on Saint Petersburg's Palace Square, as well as similar events held in the Volsk, Penza and Omsk.

==== Namesake ====
The school is named after Army General Andrey Khrulyov, who is known well for developing the Red Army logistic system. He is also one of the few men with his rank to be buried in the Kremlin Wall Necropolis. The decision to give the honorific to the academy was made in 2003. By resolution of academy commandant, the year 2017 was declared as the year of "the great intendant General of the Army Andrey Vasilyevich Khrulyov". This was done In connection with the 125th birthday of Khrulyov. That year, a number of commemorative events were organized at the academy.

=== Cadet band ===
The military band of the academy was founded in 1943 of the Higher Officers' Artillery and Technical School in Tula. It is an integral part of the academy's Penza branch, with the military band being attached to it. It provides support to events in the Penza Oblast. The band has often been awarded for its performances and everyday service.

== Awards ==
- Order of Kutuzov
- Order of Lenin
- Order of the Red Banner
- Order of the Red Banner (Afghanistan)
- Order of the Red Banner (People's Republic of Mongolia)
- Order of the Red Banner (People's Republic of Bulgaria)
- Order of the People's Republic of Bulgaria
- Order of the Red Banner (Czechoslovakia)
- Order of Merit of the Republic of Poland
- Jubilee Badge of Honor to Commemorate the 50th Anniversary of the Formation of the USSR
- Battle Order "For Merit to the People and the Fatherland" (German Democratic Republic)

== Heads ==
- Lieutenant General Nikolai Solovyov (1900–1907)
- Infantry General Vladimir Bukholts
- Major General Pyotr Yakubinsky (1918–1919)
- Major General Georgy Livadin (1920)
- Mikhail Lezgintsev (1920)
- Nikolai Suleiman (1920–1921)
- Nikolai Deutsch (1922–1925)
- Commissar 2nd rank Alexander Shifres (1936–1937)
- Corps Commander Semyon Pugachev (1932–1938)
- Lieutenant General of Technical Troops Viktor Filichkin (1937–1946)
- Lieutenant General Pyotr Davydov (1937–1945)
- Colonel General Vladimir Vostrukhov (1946–1949)
- Lieutenant General Alexander Chernyakov (1950–1956)
- Colonel General Mikhail Milovsky (1956–1965)
- Colonel General Konstantin Abramov (1965–1986)
- Colonel General Gennady Pastukhovsky (February 1986 – September 1991)
- Colonel General Anatoly Ermakov (May 1991 – April 2000)
- Lieutenant General Valery Moskovchenko (April 2000 – 2009)
- Major General Alexander Tselykovskikh (June 2010 – 2012)
- Lieutenant General Vladimir Ivanovsky (September 2012 – August 2016)
- Lieutenant General Andrey Toporov (August 2016 – present)

== Notable graduates ==
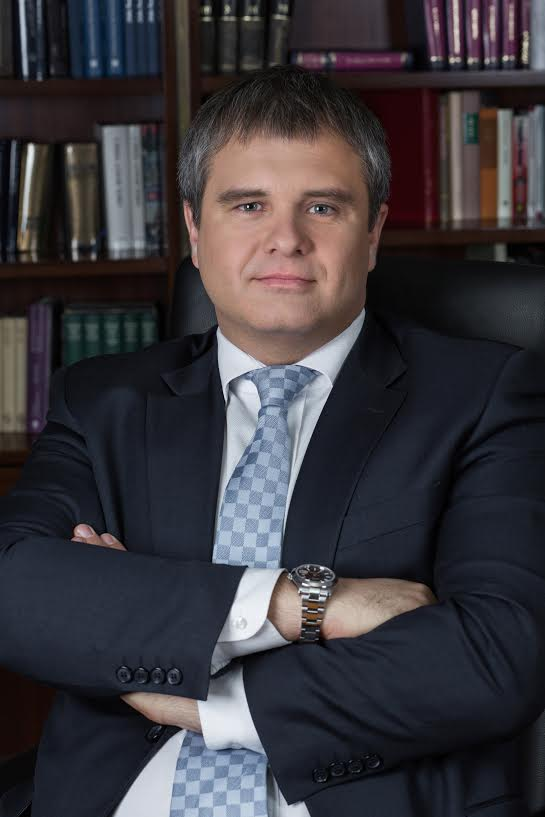
Roman Putin

Among the notable graduates are 15 people with the title of Hero of the Soviet Union and another 15 who are recipients of the Hero of Socialist Labor. Other graduates include:

- Igor Levitin, former Russian Minister of Transport.
- Mammadrafi Mammadov, 9th Minister of Defense of Azerbaijan
- Mikhail Mikhin
- Alexander Pylcyn
- Roman Putin, great-nephew of Russian President Vladimir Putin.

== See also ==
- Army Logistics University
