= Krasna Poliana =

Krasna Poliana (Ukrainian: Красна Поляна) may refer to several settlements in Ukraine:

- The former name of Nova Karakuba, Donetsk Oblast
- Krasna Poliana, Kharkiv Oblast
- Krasna Poliana, Chornomorske Raion, Crimea
- Krasna Poliana, Krasnohvardiiske Raion, Crimea
