= Zmiev Uyezd =

Zmiev uyezd
- Former subdivision of the Russian Empire
- 1797–1923
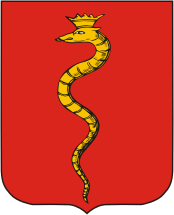
- Coat of arms

- Capital: Zmiev
- Population
  - (1897): 231 491
- History
  - Established: 1797
  - Disestablished: 1923

Zmiev uyezd was an uezd (district) in the Kharkov Governorate of the Russian Empire.

== History ==
This uyezd was created on 1796 - 1802. The administrative centre of uyezd was small town Zmiev. Since 1797 Zmiev got city rights and its own coat of arms.

The uyezd had two towns (Zmiev and Chuguev) and consisted of 24 volosts.

In January 1897, according to the Russian Empire Census, the population of the uyezd was 231 491 people.

In 1918 it became part of Donets-Krivoy Rog Soviet Republic.

By the Soviet administrative reform of 1923, uyezd was transformed into Zmiiv Raion.

== Sources ==
- Змиев // Энциклопедический словарь Брокгауза и Ефрона : в 86 т. (82 т. и 4 доп.). T. 12A — СПб., 1894.
- History of Zmievland
