= Krasnohvardiiske =

Krasnohvardiiske Красногвардійське
- Urban-type settlement
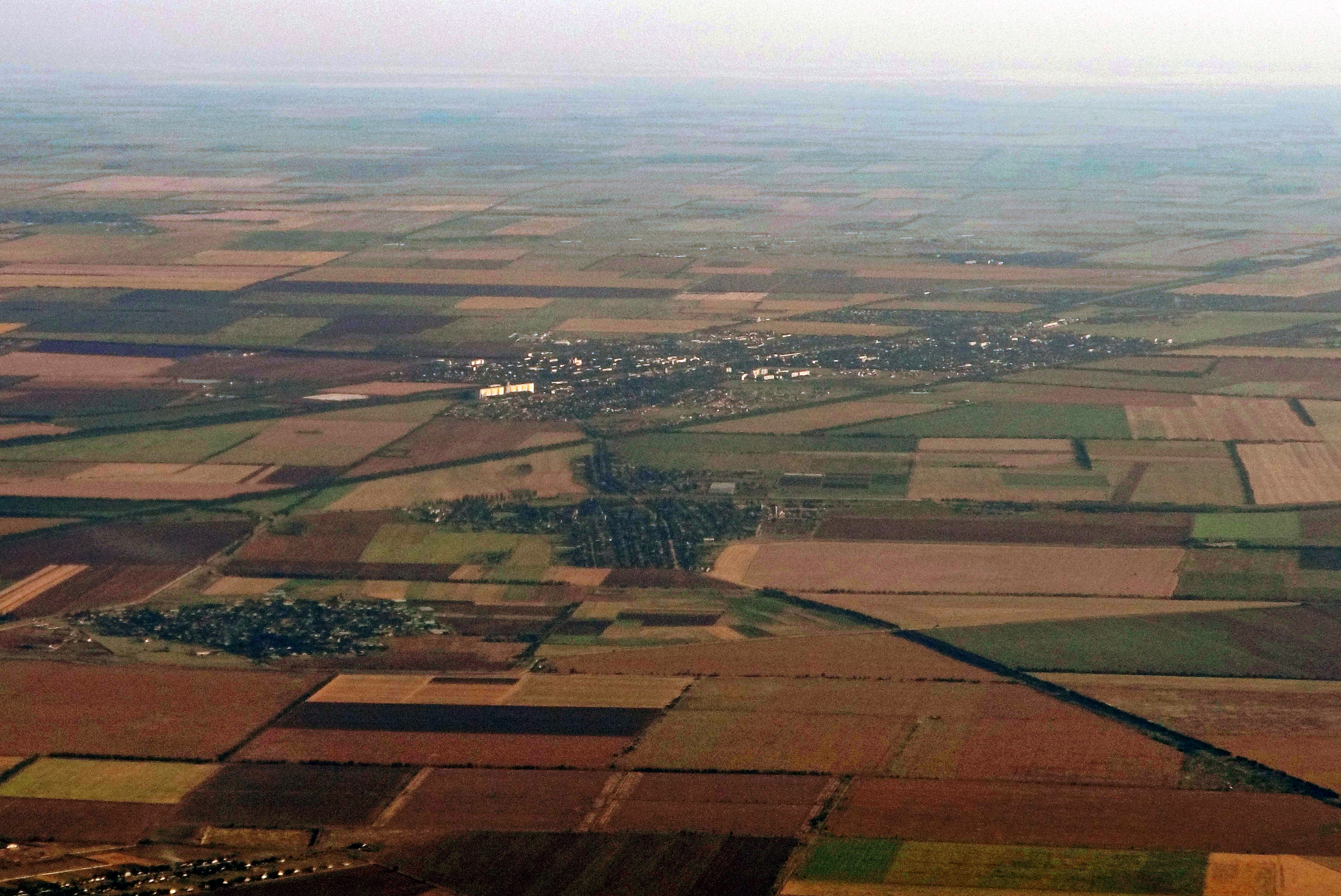
- Krasnohvardiiske from the air from the south, Maryanivka is at the foreground

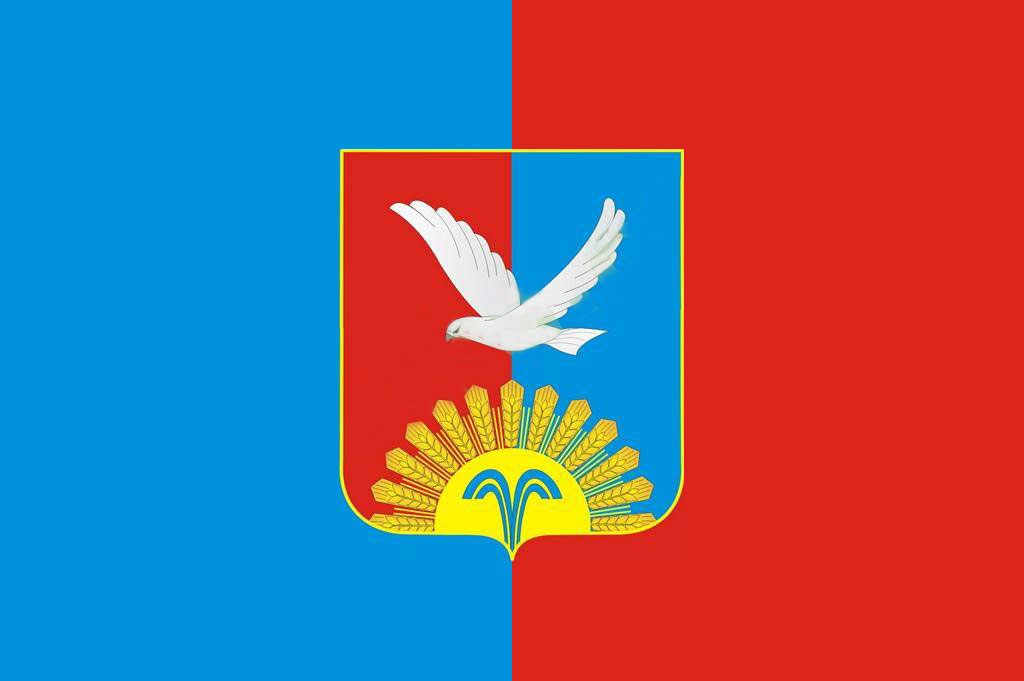
- Flag
- Interactive map of Krasnohvardiiske
- Location of Krasnohvardiiske in Crimea
- Coordinates: 45°29′41″N 34°17′41″E
- Country: Ukraine (occupied by Russia)
- Crimea: Crimea (de jure)
- Raion: Kurman Raion (de jure)
- Federal subject: Crimea (de facto)
- District: Krasnohvardiiske District (de facto)
- Town status: 1957

Government
  - Town Head: Viktor Kozytskyi
- Elevation: 46 m (151 ft)

Population (2014)
  - Total: 11,134
- Time zone: UTC+4 (MSK)
- Postal code: 97000
- Area code: +380 6556

Krasnohvardiiske, (Note: Ukrainian: Красногвардійське) also known as Krasnogvardeyskoye (Note: Variously also spelled Krasnogvardeyskoe and Krasnogvardeiskoe, all from Russian: Красногвардейское) or Kurman, (Note: Ukrainian and Russian: Курман; Crimean Tatar: Qurman) is an urban-type settlement in the Crimea, a territory recognized by a majority of countries as part of Ukraine and annexed by Russia. The town also serves as the administrative center of Krasnohvardiiske Raion (district) - also known as Kurman Raion - and houses the district's local administration buildings. Its population is 11,134 (2014 Census).

The former Veseloye air base is located nearby.

== History ==
=== Early history ===
The exact date of foundation of the settlement is unknown. It is first mentioned in written sources in 1865 under its original name, Kurman-Kemelchi (Ukrainian: Курман-Кемельчі; Russian: Курман-Кемельчи). This name, which comes from a Crimean Tatar-language phrase literally meaning "not-drying", is a reference to the swampy, wet conditions of the area around the village. At this time, it was part of Perekopsky Uyezd of Taurida Governorate of the Russian Empire.

In the 1870s, a railway station was built nearby, spurring the growth of the village and making it a hub for wheat sales. In 1905, Kurman-Kemelchi had a population of 48 people, all of whom were Crimean Tatars, the indigenous people of Crimea. In 1908, a church was built in the village. By 1913, the population had grown to 72.

=== Soviet period ===
During the Russian Civil War that began in 1918, Kurman-Kemelchi changed hands between the warring sides multiple times. In 1921, the village was designated a selyshche (rural-type settlement), and became the center of Kurman Raion within the Crimean ASSR. In 1926, Kurman-Kemelchi had a population of 811 people, of whom 617 were Russians, 74 Jews, 61 Germans, 24 Ukrainians, eight Armenians, five Crimean Tatars, and five Greeks. In 1935, Kurman-Kemelchi became the center of a national raion for the ethnic German minority, named after Ernst Thalmann. By 1939, the village had a population of 1,754 people.

During World War II, Kurman-Kemelchi was occupied by Nazi Germany. In either 1941 or 1942, around 60 Jews from Kurman-Kemelchi and surrounding villages were imprisoned in a building in the village by the Nazis for days, before being murdered at a brickworks by a yet-unidentified Nazi SS unit. On 21 August 1945, after the end of fighting in Crimea, the village was renamed Krasnohvardiiske by the Soviet government. That same year, the German national raion it was in was renamed to Krasnohvardiiske Raion. By 1946, the population had fallen to 1,612 people.

Krasnohvardiiske received urban-type settlement status in September 1957. The population had grown rapidly, reaching around 4,200 by 1959. It continued to grow throughout the remainder of the 20th century, reaching 7,600 by 1970 and 9,100 people by 1979.

=== 21st century ===
In 2014, Russia invaded and annexed the entire Crimean peninsula from Ukraine, including Krasnohvardiiske, beginning an ongoing occupation. Krasnohvardiiske has been the site of repressions against Jehovah's Witnesses, a religious minority group that is persecuted in Russia.

During the full-scale Russian invasion of Ukraine that began in 2022, Ukraine has retaliated by repeatedly attacking Russian assets in Crimea. On 22 July 2023, Russia-installed governor of Crimea Sergey Aksyonov reported there had been an explosion at an ammunition depot in Krasnohvardiiske, attributing it to a Ukrainian drone strike. The authorities evacuated all civilians in a 3 kilometres (1.9 mi) radius and briefly paused traffic on the Crimean Bridge.

In September 2023 a law enacted by the Verkhovna Rada of Ukraine came into effect restoring the historic name Kurman in Ukrainian law as part of decommunization in Ukraine. Russia, which has occupied the peninsula since 2014, continues to refer to the town as Krasnogvardeyskoye.

== Demographics ==
Population history

Year	Pop.	±%
1905	48	—
1913	72	+50.0%
1926	811	+1026.4%
1939	1,754	+116.3%
1946	1,612	−8.1%
1959	4,200	+160.5%

Year	Pop.	±%
1970	7,600	+81.0%
1979	9,100	+19.7%
1989	11,448	+25.8%
2001	11,112	−2.9%
2014	11,134	+0.2%

As of the 2001 Ukrainian census, its population was 11,112. In terms of self-reported ethnic background, 58% of residents were Russians, 24.9% were Ukrainians, and 16.6 were Crimean Tatars. By 2014, the population had stayed mostly the same, at 11,134.

The town has multiple religious communities: There are followers of the Ukrainian Orthodox Church (Moscow Patriarchate), Islam, Jehovah's Witnesses, the Seventh-day Adventist Church, and the Evangelical Baptist Union of Ukraine.

== See also ==
- Oktiabrske, the other urban-type settlement in Krasnohvardiiske Raion of Crimea
