= Trial of the Sixteen (disambiguation) =

The Trial of the Sixteen was a staged trial of 16 leaders of the Polish Secret State held by the Soviet Union in Moscow in 1945.

Trial of the Sixteen may also refer to:

- Trial of the Sixteen (1880), a trial of sixteen members of the Narodnaya volya in the Russian Empire
- Trial of the Sixteen (2011–2015), a trial of sixteen Jehovah's Witnesses in the Russian Federation
- Trial of the Sixteen, the first of the Moscow Trials during the Great Purge in the USSR
