= Veseloye (air base) =

Veseloye
- Krasnohvardiiske, Krasnohvardiiske Raion, Crimea in Ukraine
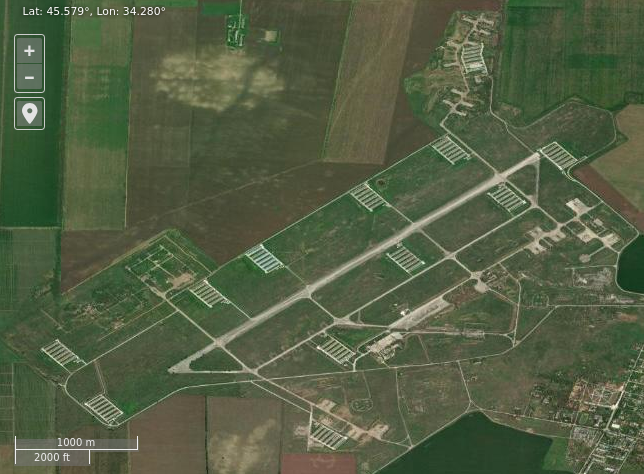
- Satellite imagery of Veseloye airbase

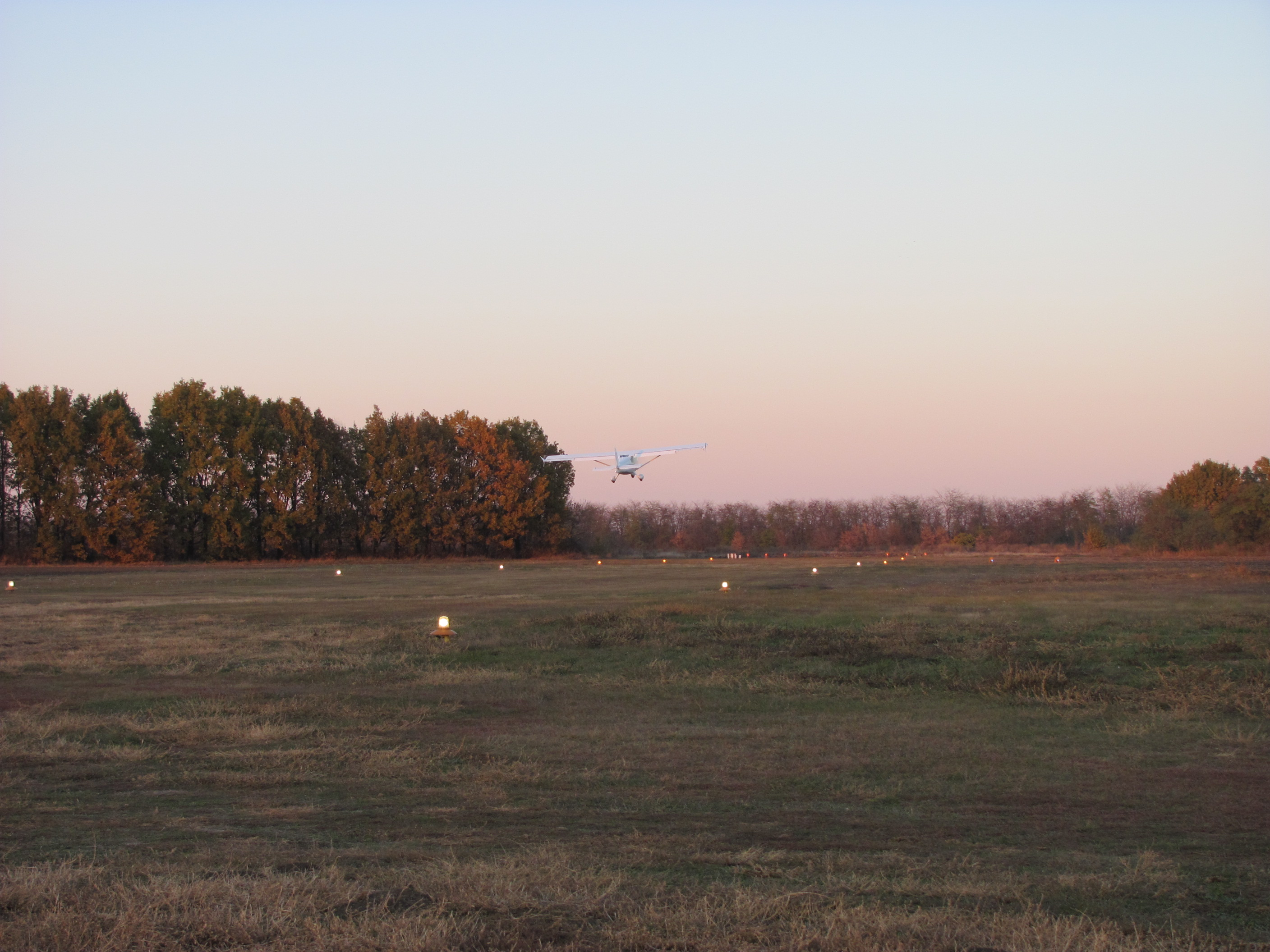
- Veseloye airbase

Site information
- Type: Air Base
- Operator: Russian Navy – Russian Naval Aviation
- Controlled by: Black Sea Fleet

Location
- Shown within Ukraine
- Coordinates: 45°34′44″N 34°16′49″E

Site history
- In use: -present

Airfield information
- Elevation: 50 metres (164 ft) AMSL
Runways
Direction	Length and surface
05/23	3,240 metres (10,630 ft) Concrete

Veseloye is a former Russian Navy Black Sea Fleet airbase located near Krasnohvardiiske, Krasnohvardiiske Raion, Crimea, Ukraine

The base was used by the following units:

- HQ of 2nd Guards Maritime Missile Aviation Division (1952-57)
- 5th Guards Maritime Missile Aviation Regiment (1960-94)
- 981st Maritime Torpedo Aviation Regiment (1952-60)
