= Zakhar Slyusarenko =

Soviet tankman

- Захар Слюсаренко
- Born: 16 September [O.S. 3 September] 1907; Zmiyov, Kharkov Governorate, Russian Empire
- Died: 6 April 1987 (aged 79); Kiev, Ukrainian SSR, Soviet Union
- Military career
- Allegiance: Soviet Union
- Branch: Red Army
- Service years: 1932–1965
- Rank: General-lieutenant
- Conflicts: World War II
- Awards: Hero of the Soviet Union (twice)

Zakhar Karpovich Slyusarenko (Russian: Захар Карпович Слюсаренко; Ukrainian: Захар Карпович Слюсаренко, romanized: Zakhar Karpovych Sliusarenko; 16 September [O.S. 3 September] 1907 – 6 April 1987) was a Soviet tank officer who rose from battalion commander to brigade commander during World War II. He was twice awarded the title of Hero of the Soviet Union.

== Early life ==
Slyusarenko was born on 16 September [O.S. 3 September] 1907 to a large Ukrainian peasant family in Zmiiv. His family moved to Merefa in 1909, where he completed school and began working at a glass factory in 1923. Initially a member of the Komsomol, he became a member of the Communist Party in 1929. From that year until 1931 he was the secretary of the Komsomol committee of the factory, since he went on to join the party committee in 1931. The next year he graduated from a trade school in Kharkhiv before entering the Red Army in June. After graduating from the Oryol Armored School in 1934, he commanded a tank platoon in the 4th Heavy Tank Regiment, and in November 1935, he transferred to another unit. In April he took command of a training platoon before being made chief of staff of the 57th Tank Battalion. In that capacity, he participated in the Soviet invasion of Poland, including the annexation of Lviv. In March 1940, he became a battalion commander within 19th Tank Regiment.

== World War II ==
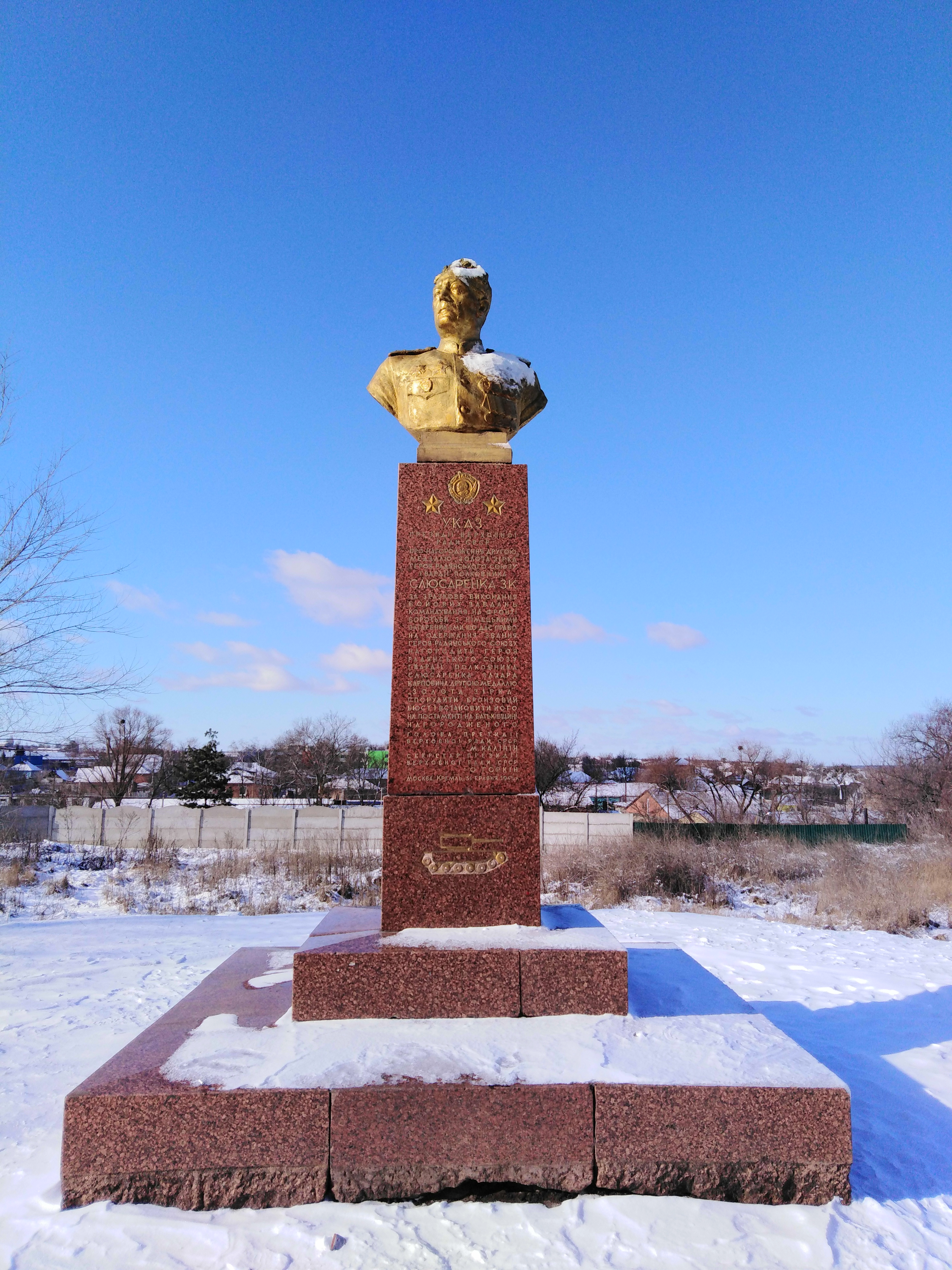
Monument twice to the Hero of the Soviet Union Zakhar Slyusarenko. Zmiiv (Ukraine)

At the time of the start of the German invasion of the Soviet Union, Slyusarenko was a battalion commander in the 10th Tank Division. His baptism by fire occurred on 22 June 1941, in the battles for the border areas of Western Ukraine. In the ensuing fighting he became surrounded near Berdichev and Uman, but broke out of the encirclement both times. After the breakthrough he became commander of a battalion in the 133rd Tank Brigade in September 1941, and in May 1942 he was promoted to deputy commander of the 168th Armored Brigade. Several months later he was given command of the 49th Separate Guards Tank Regiment, where he gained breakthroughs on the Leningrad Front.

In February 1944, he became the commander of the 56th Guards Tank Brigade, a position where he led in multiple major breakthroughs of enemy lines that resulted in his gold stars. During the Lvov-Sandomierz Offensive the unit went on to take control of enemy-held territory in Poland, including an important bridgehead on the left bank Vistula. Despite facing multiple counterattacks they managed to expand their control of the Sandomierz bridgehead. For his actions in that operation he was awarded the title Hero of the Soviet Union on 23 September 1944. He then went on to fight in the Vistula-Oder, Silesia, Berlin, and Prague campaigns. His second gold star was awarded after the end of the war on 31 May 1945 for the crossing of the flooded Telt Canal on the southern outskirts of Berlin; during the battle his brigade advanced through heavily defended enemy territory, taking out 48 tanks, two trains, two warehouses, taking over 400 prisoners, and killing over 600 enemy combatants. He was wounded six times in the war, but only hospitalized twice.

== Postwar ==
After the war he remained in command of his brigade until August; due to reorganization of the military he was made commander of the 56th Guards Tank Regiment, which became downgraded to a battalion in December 1946. In 1947 he was promoted to deputy commander of the 180th Guards Mechanized Division, but left at the end of 1948 to attend officer training, which he graduated from in 1949. From 1950 to 1956, he commanded the 3rd Armored Division, during which was promoted to major-general in 1953, and in 1957 he graduated from the Military Academy of General Staff. In 1960, he became the deputy commander-in-chief for combat training of the Northern Group of Forces and was promoted to lieutenant-general in 1963, but retired in 1965. He died in Kyiv on 6 April 1987, and was buried in the Baikove cemetery.

== Awards ==
Soviet

- Twice Hero of the Soviet Union
- Two Order of Lenin
- Order of the Red Banner
- Order of Suvorov 2nd class
- Order of the Patriotic War 1st and 2nd class
- Order of the Red Star
- Medal "For Battle Merit"
- campaign and jubilee medals

Foreign

- Poland - Silver Cross of the Virtuti Militari
- Poland - Medal of Victory and Freedom
- Poland - Medal "For Oder, Neisse, and the Baltics"
- Czechoslovakia - Czechoslovak War Cross

== See also ==
- Aleksandr Golovachev
- David Dragunsky
- Stepan Shutov
