= Zmiiv =

City in Kharkiv Oblast, Ukraine

Zmiiv Зміїв
- City
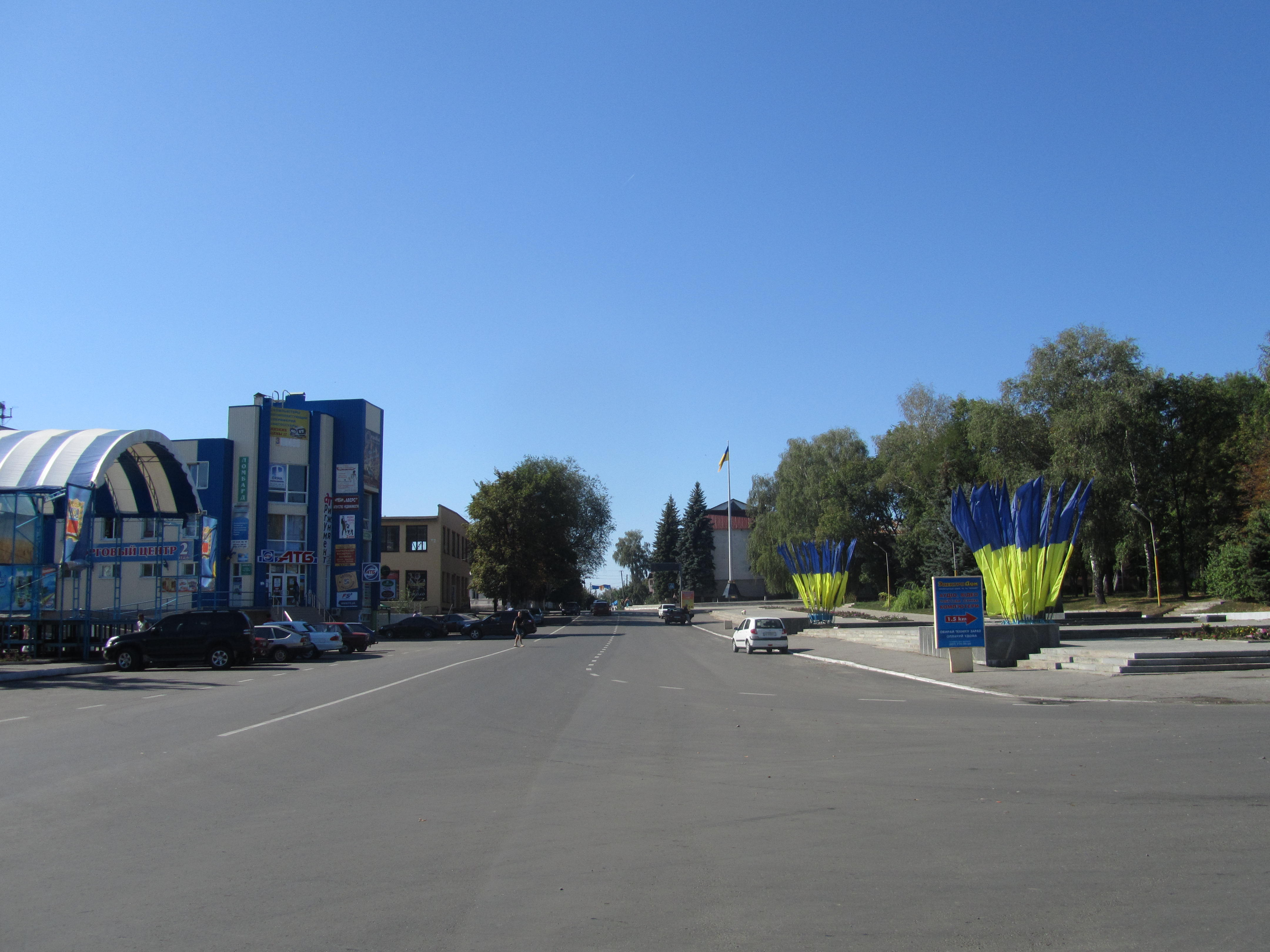
- Downtown Zmiiv

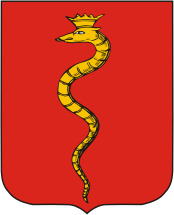
- Coat of arms
- Interactive map of Zmiiv
- Location within Kharkiv Oblast Location within Ukraine
- Coordinates: 49°41′40″N 36°21′33″E
- Country: Ukraine
- Oblast: Kharkiv Oblast
- Raion: Chuhuiv Raion
- Hromada: Zmiiv urban hromada
- Founded: 1640
- City rights: 1797

Area
  - Total: 55.77 km^{2} (21.53 sq mi)

Population (2022)
  - Total: ▲13,737
- Time zone: UTC+2 (EET)
  - Summer (DST): UTC+3 (EEST)
- Postal code: 63409
- Licence plate: AX, KX, ХА (old), 21 (old)

Zmiiv or Zmiyiv (Ukrainian: Зміїв) from 1976 to 1990, is a city in Chuhuiv Raion, Kharkiv, Ukraine. It hosts the administration of Zmiiv urban hromada, one of the hromadas of Ukraine. The population in 2001 was 17,063, falling to 13,737 (2022 estimate).

The town is located 42 kilometres (26 mi) from Kharkiv. In 1976-1990, the city was called Gotwald (Ukrainian: Готвальд) in honor of the Czechoslovak communist and politician Klement Gottwald.

Until 2020, Zmiiv was the administrative centre of Zmiiv Raion, before it was merged into Chuhuiv Raion as part of that year's administrative reform.

== Toponyms ==
The name Zmiiv or Zmiyiv is almost certainly derived from the Ukrainian word for snakes (Ukrainian: змії, romanized: zmiji). In addition, there are at least five potential origins for the source of the name Zmiiv or Zmiev:

1. There is an old legend that in the dense forests and impenetrable swamps surrounding the town, there lived a winged many-headed serpent, the Zmii Horynych, who was harnessed to a large plough by Nikita Kozhemyak, and the Zmiiv ramparts were formed from the dump of this plough;
2. The river flowing into the Mozh was winding and resembled a snake;
3. A large number of reptiles lived in the surrounding swamps and forests;
4. Not far from the current Zmiiv was the capital of the Polovtsy - Sharukan, which was called змиевой in Russian, which somewhat translates to "city of the serpent" in English.
5. The so-called Serpent's Wall, the remains of ancient defensive structures originating in the 10th century to protect middle Dnieper Ukraine from pecheneg and cuman raids. In the area of Zmiiv, transport highways are laid along some ramparts.

The town's name is linked to the place names "Zmiiv kurhan" and "Zmiieve horodyshche", recorded in Russian documents of 1571 and 1627.

== History ==
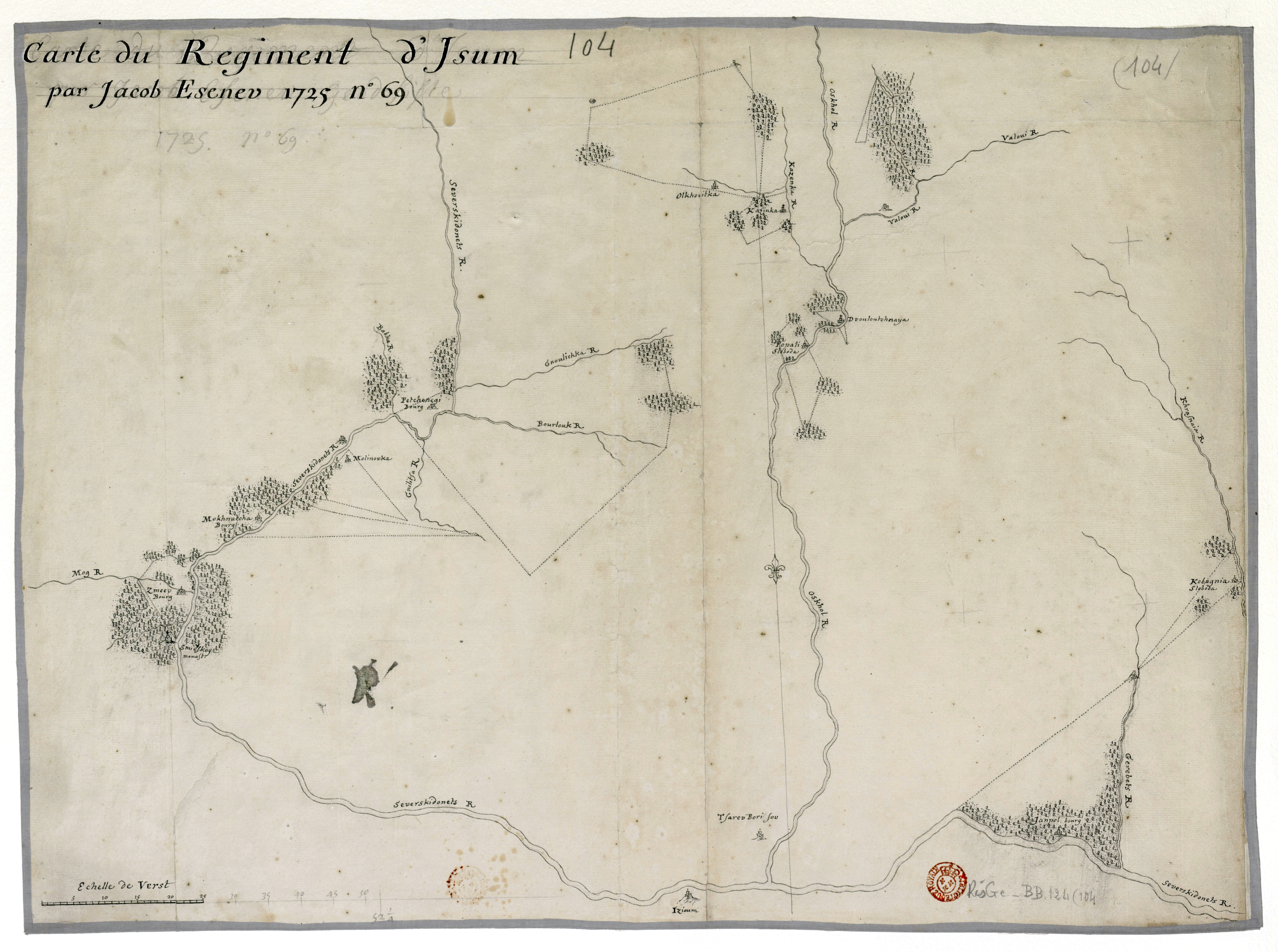
Zmiiv on the map of Izium Cossack Regiment (surveyor Yakia Yseniev), 1725.

The oldest settlement at the location of modern-day Zmiiv dates back to the 1st millennium BC. The area around Zmiiv saw numerous different people groups during its history, such as the Scythians, Sarmatians, Goths, Huns, Alans, Avars, Polovtsians, Pechenegs, Tatars, and Slavs.

Igor Svyatoslavich, prince of Novgorod-Seversky, waged wars with the Polovtsy, the Zmiiv settlement founded in 1180-1185 on the Donets at the mouth of the river Mozh.

In the mid-1500s an outpost was built there, and in the 1650s the Cossacks built a fort there to defend the vicinity against the Tatars. Zmiiv was a company town of the Kharkiv regiment from 1669 to 1765. It was ravaged by the Tatars in 1688, 1689, and 1692. Its Cossacks took part in the uprisings led by Ivan Dzykovksy (1670) and Kodratii Bulavin (1707–9).

The new wave of settlement of the Wild Field lands, and in particular the lands of the Slobozhanshchina, dates back to the 1630-50s, when thousands of Ukrainians were forced to flee from massacre after unsuccessful revolts against the Polish authorities. 1640 is the official date of foundation of the city. According to the Encyclopedia of the History of Ukraine, this date is based on legendary accounts, and the town was founded in 1655 by settlers from the Hetmanate. But in the same year, the Tatars seized the city, which was captured by Cossacks Kondratii Sulima. In the 1650s, to the south of the Zmiiv appeared the Zmiiv Nikolaev Cossack Monastery, which was the castle of the old, wounded and other Cossacks. It is believed that the monastery was a treasure chest; it had 6,000 acres of land and numerous buildings. In 1656, Yakov Khitrovo was appointed as governor of Zmiiv by Tsar Alexei Mikhailovich.

At the end of 17th century, the Zmiiv was already a large enough settlement, surrounded by posts: Zamost, Zidki, and Sands. And if for some time he was a part of the Chuguev uyezd, then from 1657 he became the center of the newly created Zmiev uyezd. Sources also mention the weapons of the local fortress: in 1668 it had 7 large cast iron guns, 290 cores and a lot of gunpowder, with 2 shafts surrounding it and a system of underground passages. In 1688, 1692 and 1736, Tatar attacks were carried out on the city.

The presence of settlements in Slobozhana under the rule of the Russian tsar and the strong oppression on the part of the church and the Cossack elders did not best reflect the mood of the freedom-loving settlers. Thus, in 1668, a rebellion broke out in a number of towns and cities in Slobozhanshchyna, which was headed by Ivan Sirko. During the fighting against government forces, the insurgents burned down the Zmiiv. In several clashes the rebels were defeated, many fled to the Right-bank Ukraine. 2 years later, in 1670, some towns in the Slobozhanshchina supported the rebels under the leadership of Stepan Razin, in particular, there were detachments of Zaporizhzhya and Don Cossacks commanded by Stenka Razin associate, Alexei Khromy. And the Zmiiv became the center of rebellion on the local lands. After the tsarist forces managed to suppress the rebellion, several dozen people were hanged on local roads. According to lord-colonel of Kharkiv cossacks regiment Kvitka, the Tatars' raids have stopped since 1736.

In 1788, the Zmiiv Monastery was destroyed by order of Tsarina Catherine II. Between 1797 and 1920 the city was an administrative centre of Zmiev uyezd in Kharkov Governorate of Russian Empire. From 1891 to 1893, Zmiiv Paper Mill was built here.

During the Ukrainian War of Independence, from 1917 to 1920, it passed between various factions. Afterwards it was administratively part of the Kharkiv Governorate of Ukraine.

A local newspaper is published in the city since November 1930. Across 1932 and 1933, 559 victims of the Holodomor genocide in Ukraine were identified in Zmiiv and neighbouring Zamostya, which has since been absorbed into the city.

During World War II, Zmiiv was occupied by the German army from 22 October 1941 to 17–18 August 1943.

In 1956, a machine-building plant was established here. Between 1976 and 1990, the town was renamed to Gotwald (Ukrainian: Готвальд) after Klement Gottwald, a Czechoslovak politician.

Zmiiv was the administrative centre of Zmiiv Raion, until 18 July 2020, when the raion was abolished as part of the as part of the administrative reform of Ukraine, which reduced the number of raions of Kharkiv Oblast to seven. The area of Zmiivk Raion was merged into Chuhuiv Raion.

== Demographics ==
Historical populations
Year	Pop.	±%
1926	6,000	—
1971	16,600	+176.7%
1989	20,031	+20.7%
2001	17,063	−14.8%
2013	15,211	−10.9%
2022	13,737	−9.7%

=== Ethnic groups and spoken languages ===
Like the rest of the region, the city is ethnically overwhelmingly Ukrainian, but also hosts a sizeable minority of people, who claim to have Russian ancestry. In terms of spoken languages, most people are Ukrainophone, while 16% speak Russian as their first language. The exact ethnic and linguistic as of 2001 was as follows:

Ethnic groups in Zmiiv
Ukrainians	84.20%
Russians	14.63%
Belarusians	0.44%
Armenians	0.09%
Georgians	0.08%
Jews	0.07%

Native languages in Zmiiv
	percent
Ukrainian	83.7%
Russian	15.9%
Belarusian	0.2%
others	0.2%

== Symbols ==
The current coat of arms of the Zmiiv may have been around as long as 220 years, used since at least the second half of the eighteenth century, if not as far back as 1803. The coat of arms is an example of a canting arms, as it depicts a serpent (Ukrainian: змій) with a golden crown on its head.

On 21 September 1781, the coat of arms of the city was not officially approved by the Senate of the Russian Empire and Catherine II in one day with all the coat of arms of the county cities and the provincial centre of Kharkiv and Voronezh governorships, because the Zmiiv was not then a county town.

The coat of arms is "old", that is, historical, and made long before its approval. A distinctive feature of the "old" coats of arms was the only field of the shield - with the coat of arms of the city itself (without the coat of arms of the governorate / provincial center at the top). It was officially approved on 21 September 1803 personally by Tsar Alexander I.

The red box of the coat of arms depicts a "golden serpent twisting upwards and a crown worn on its head" showing the name of the city and the abundance of snakes in the vicinity.

In 1863 K Kene drafted the emblem of the city: On a red shield a golden serpent twisting in a pillar; in the free part of the shield the coat of arms of Kharkiv province; the shield is topped with a silver tower crown and surrounded by gold spikes connected by an Alexander ribbon.

On the coat of arms of the city of the 18th century, the artist depicted a creeping snake, unlike the coat of arms of the beginning of the 19th century, which depicts a standing snake. The modern coat of arms was approved by the City Council in the 1990s. It, like the coat of arms of the early 19th century, depicts a snake standing.

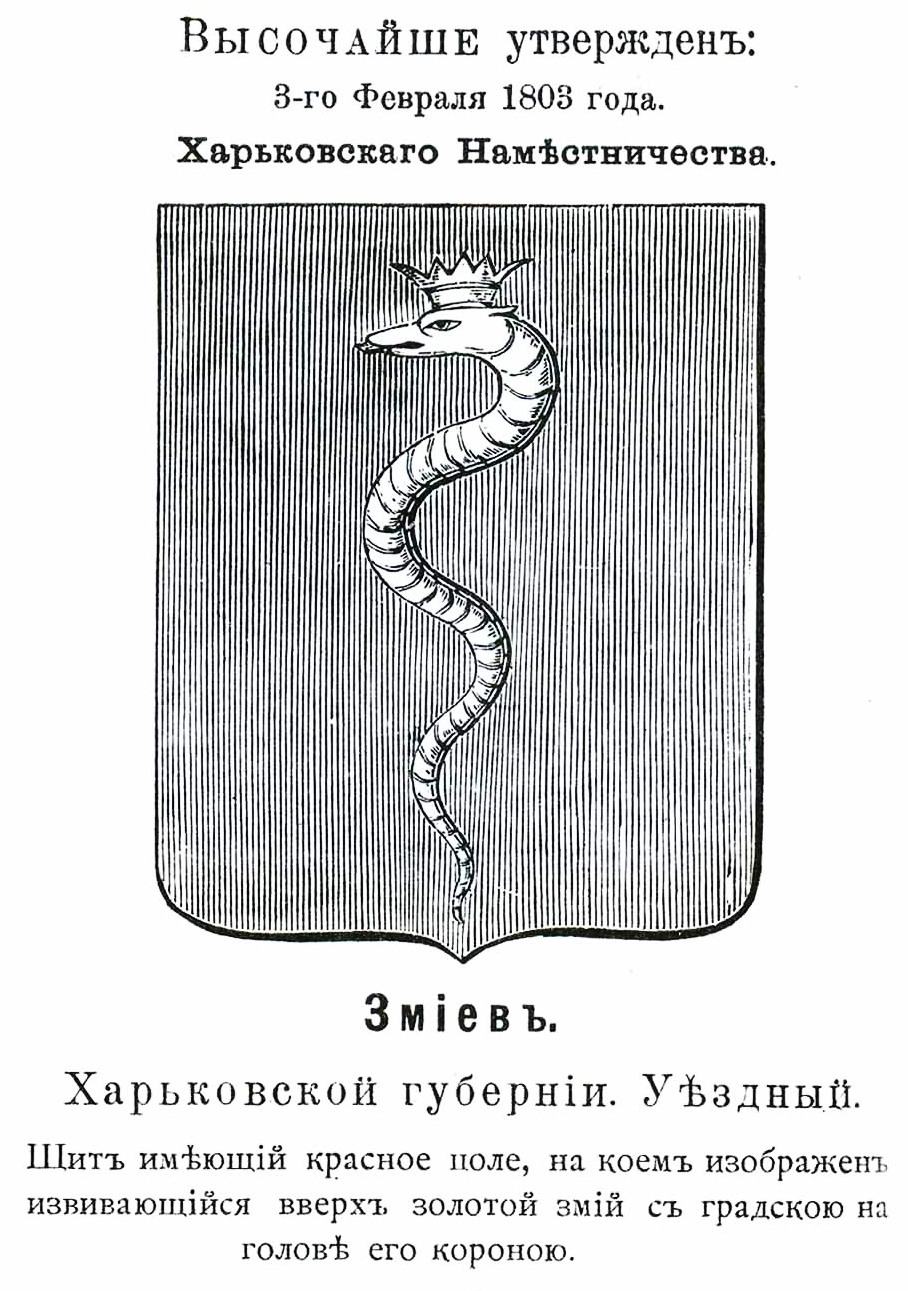
Coat of Arms with official description of 1803

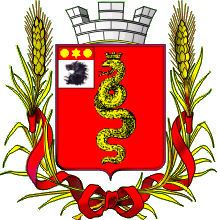
1863 Coat of Arms.
The B.Ken Project

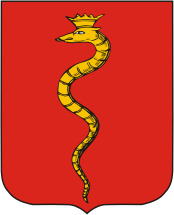
Modern coat of arms

== Geography ==
Zmiiv is situated on the right bank of the Siverskyi Donets River at the confluence of the right-hand tributary of the Mozh. It belongs to the historical region of Sloboda Ukraine.

== Economy ==
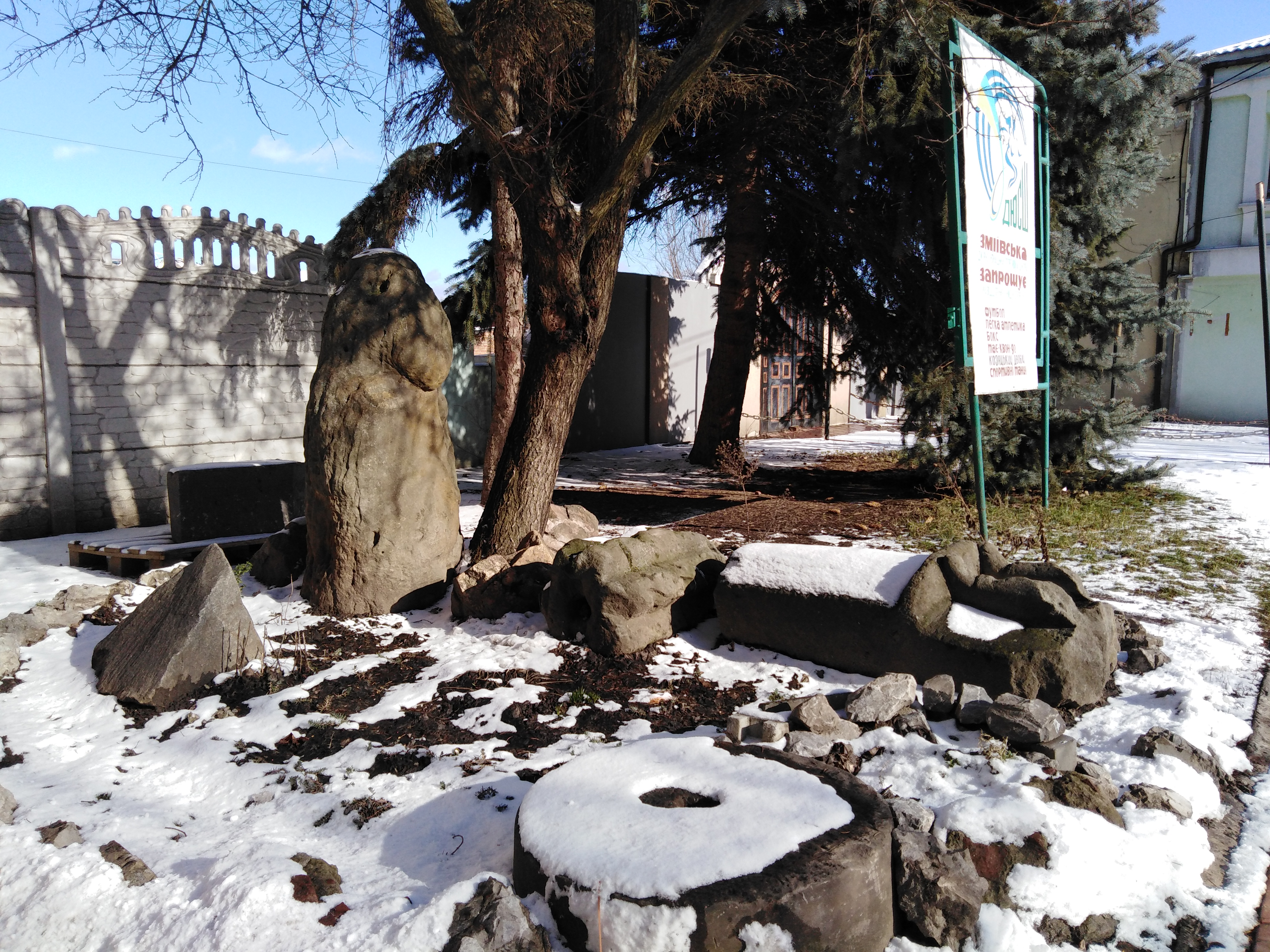
Archeology monuments near the entrance to the museum

The Zmiiv Machine-Building Plant is the largest company in town. Zmiiv also has a paper mill, packaging works, construction materials plant, publishing company, and some repair shops. It also has a large agricultural sector with a dairy plant, food-processing plant, as well as several dairy and pig farms.

The "Mayak" enterprise, which produces heating boilers, was founded in 1991.

== Transportation ==
Zmiiv is served by the Zmiiv station, which opened in 1910 on Ukraine's Southern Railway. The station is served by a commuter rail known as elektrichka, connecting Kharkiv, Merefa, and Izium with intermediate stops.

Zmiiv has a bus station, which serves as a terminus for local bus routes. Zmiiv also has a regular bus connection with Kharkiv.

== Sports ==
Zmiiv has one football club playing in the Kharkiv Oblast Premier League, FC Mashynobudivnyk Zmiiv.

== Points of interest ==
- Ionospheric Observatory of the Institute of ionosphere (49°40′37″N 36°17′32″E)

== Monuments ==
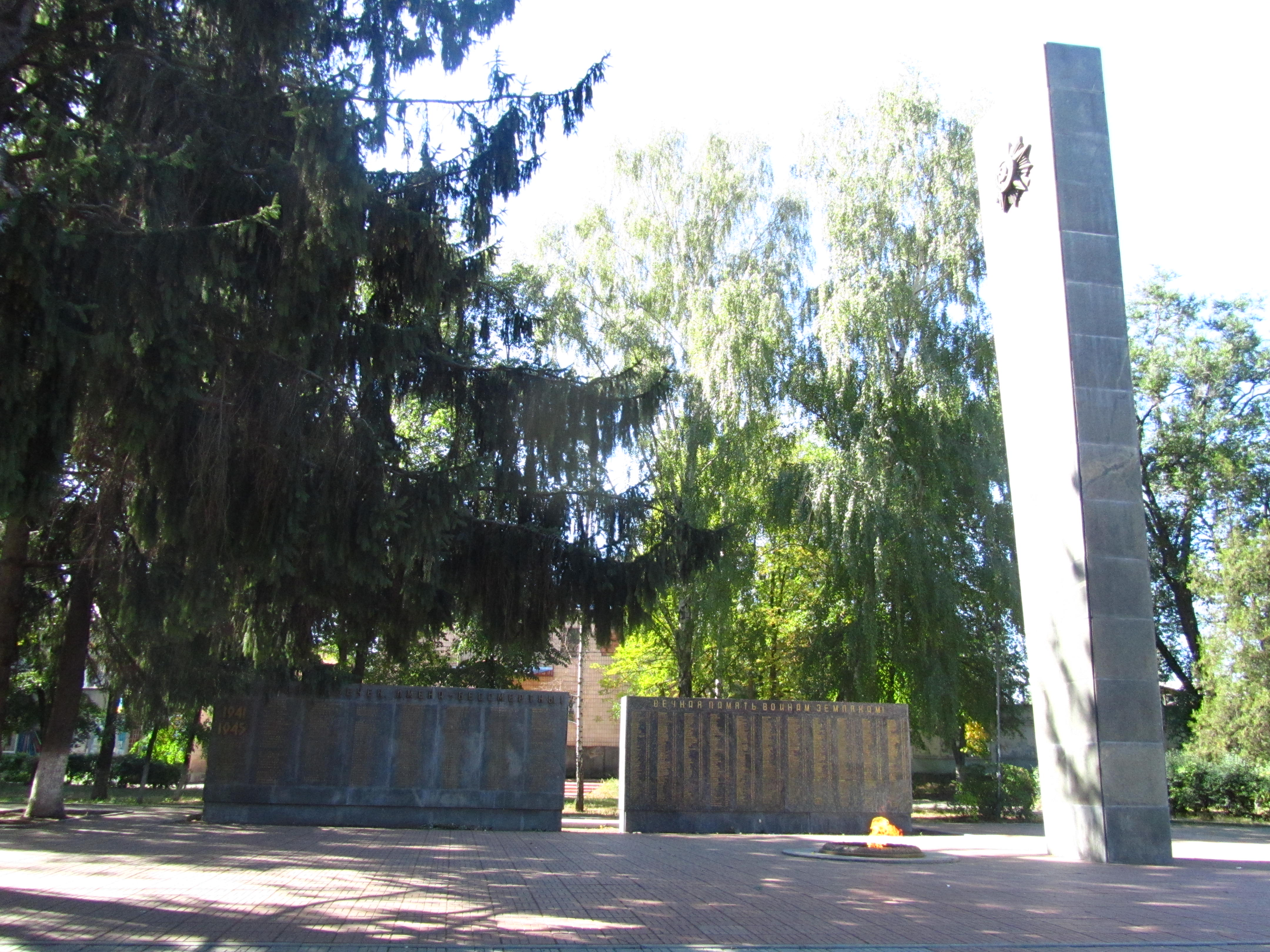
Memorial to the soldiers who died in World War II

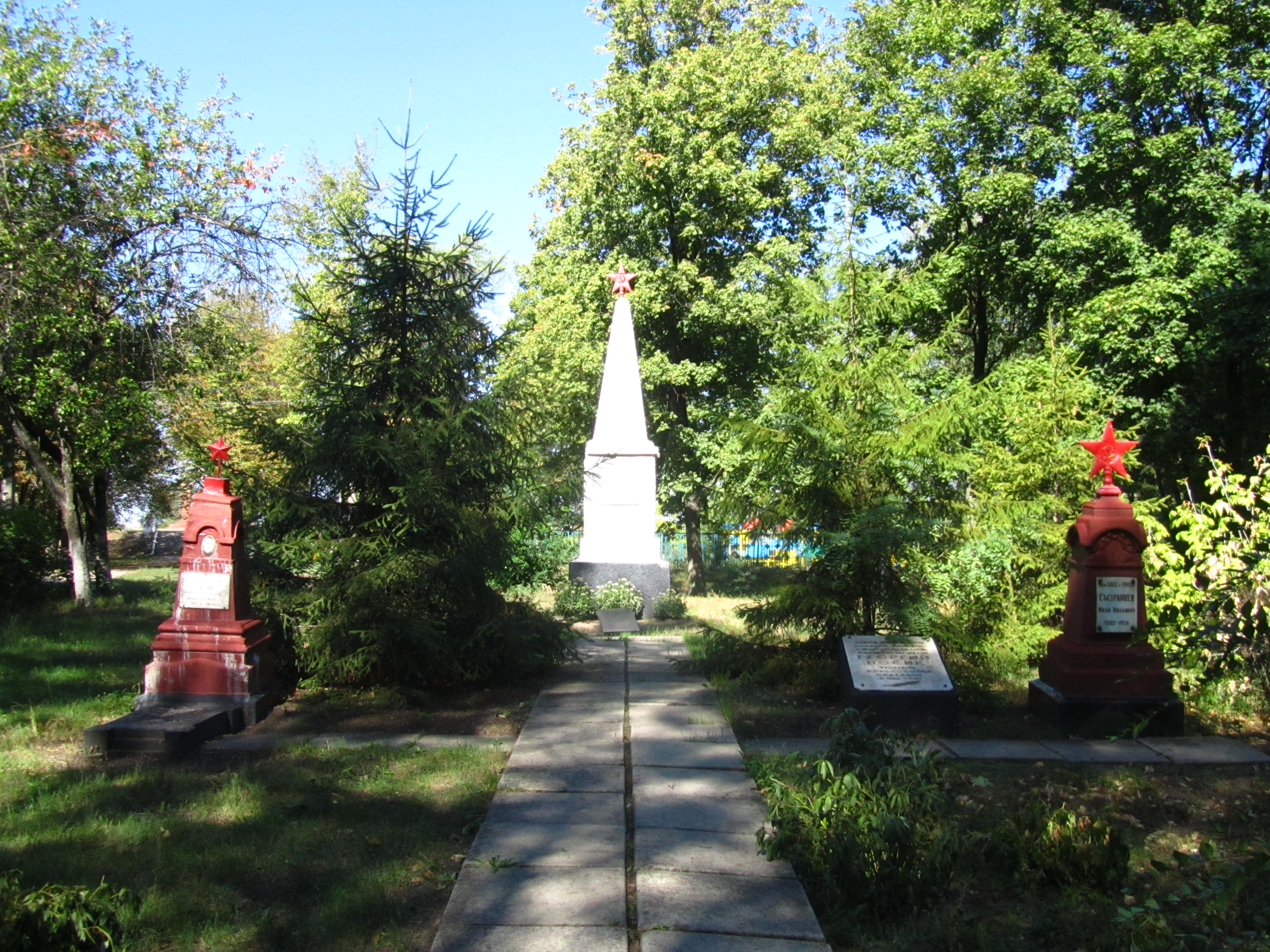
Memorial to the Red Army killed in 1918–1921, 1924

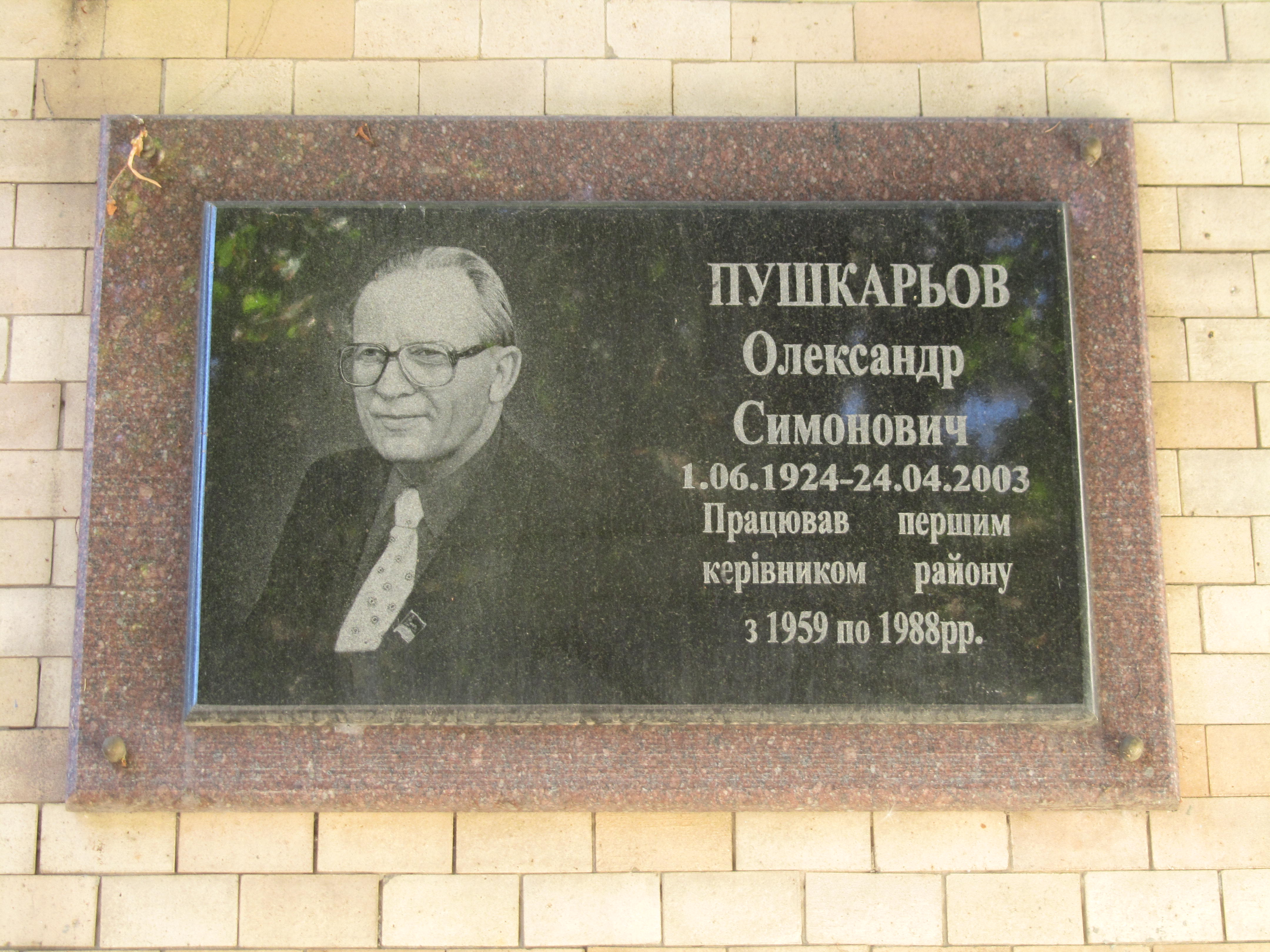
Commemorative plaque of Pushkarev

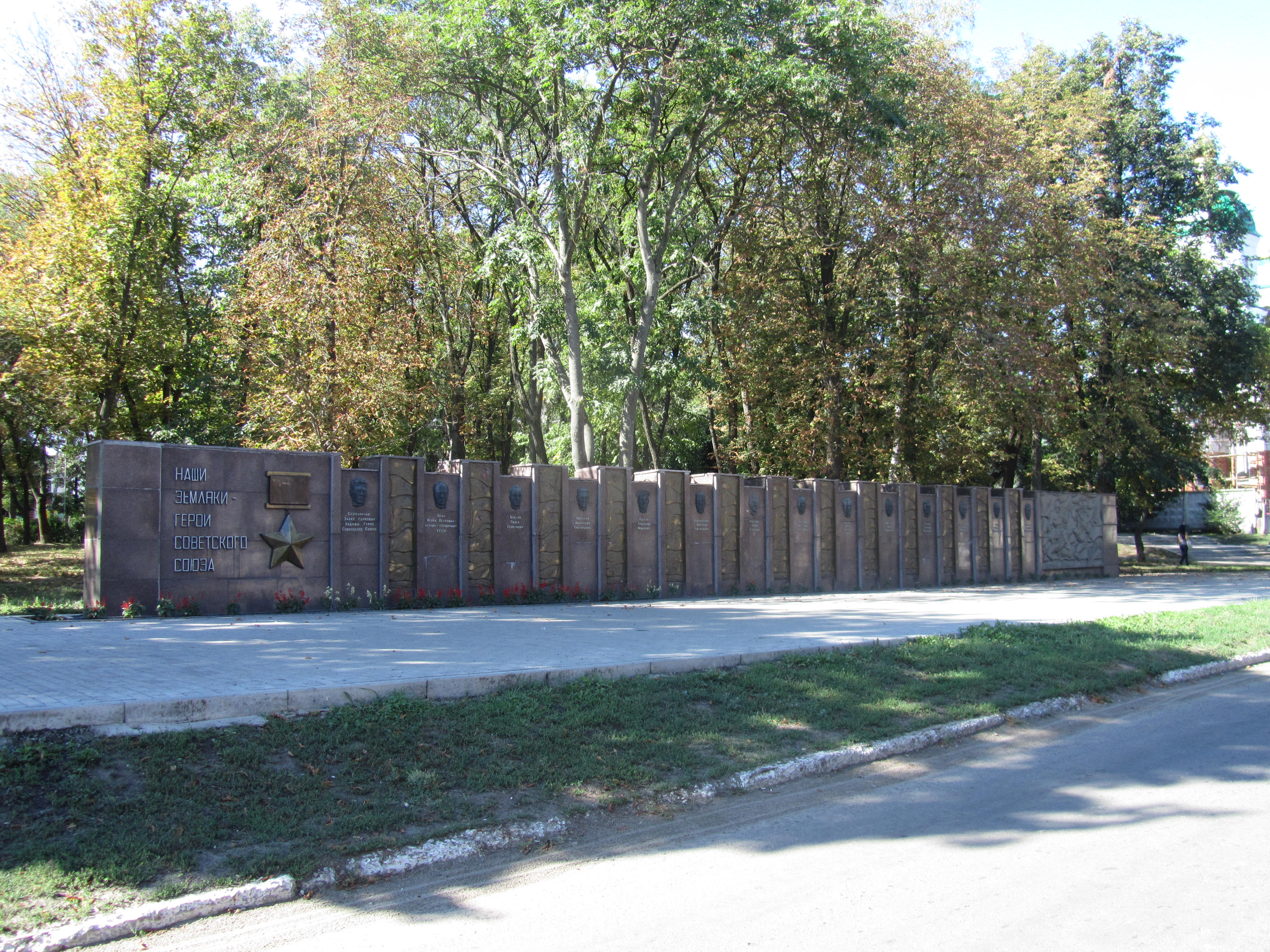
Monument to fellow countrymen of the heroes of the Soviet Union

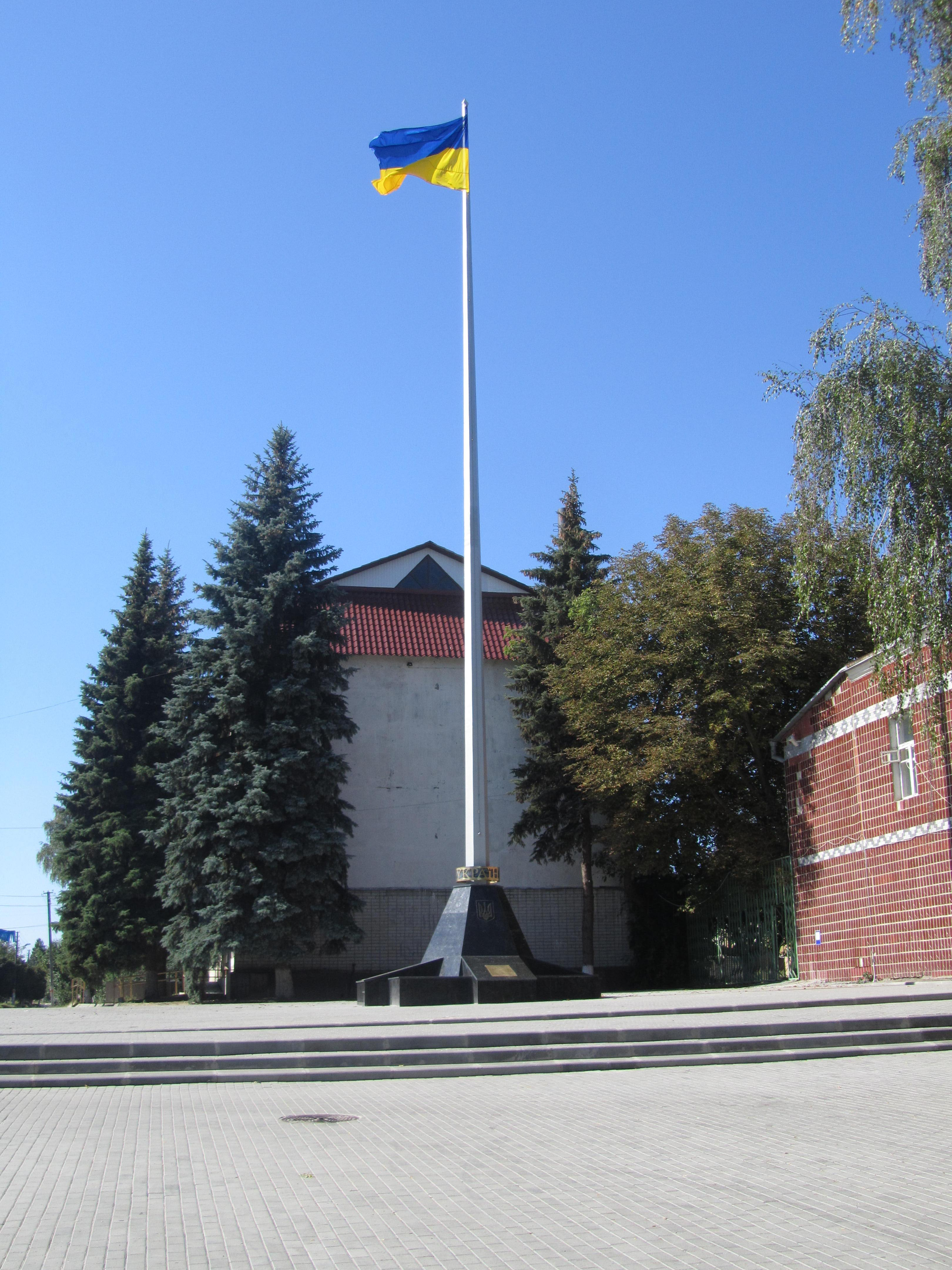
State flag of Ukraine in honor of the 20th anniversary of independence

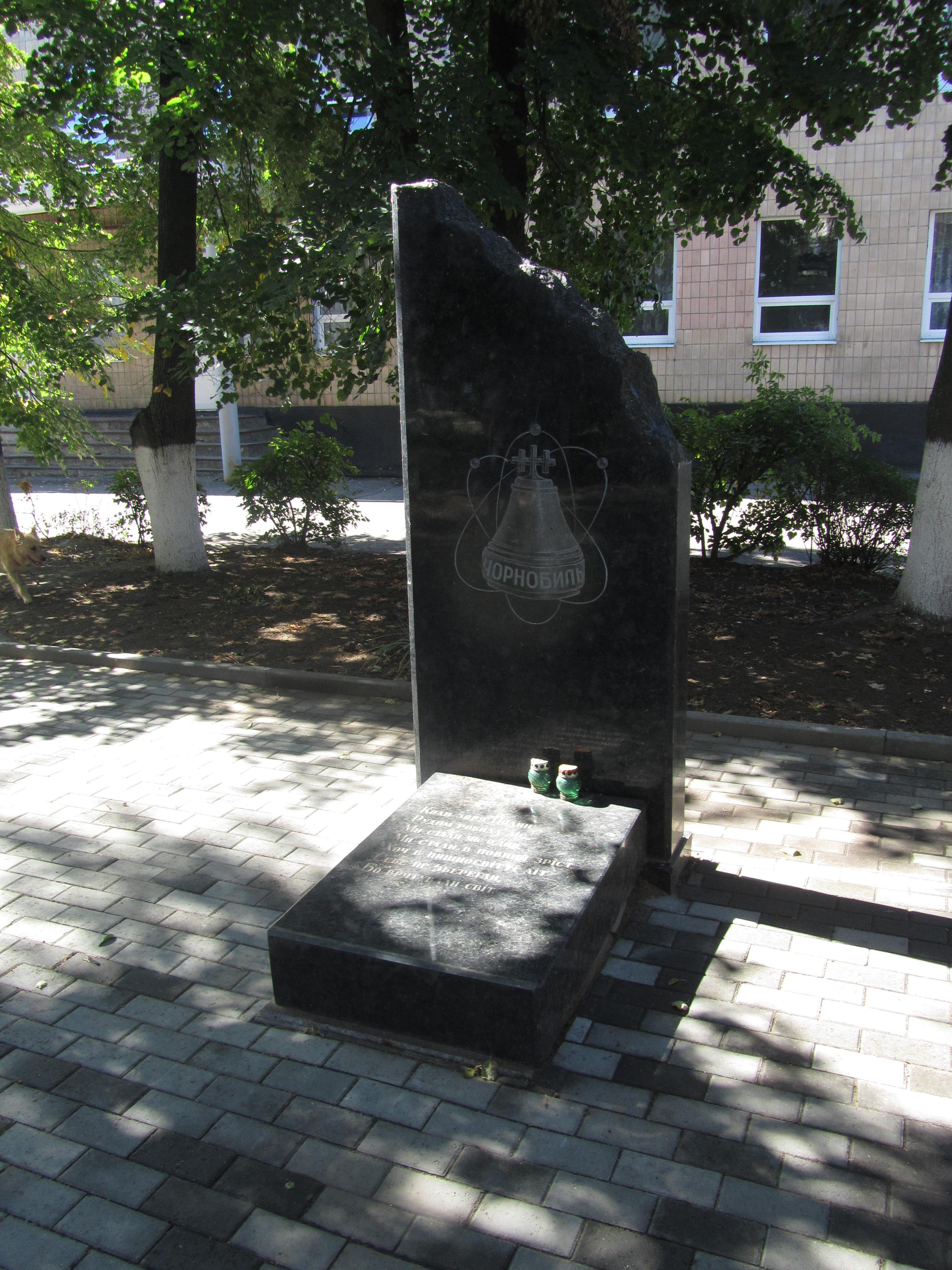
A commemorative sign of the Chernobyl tragedy

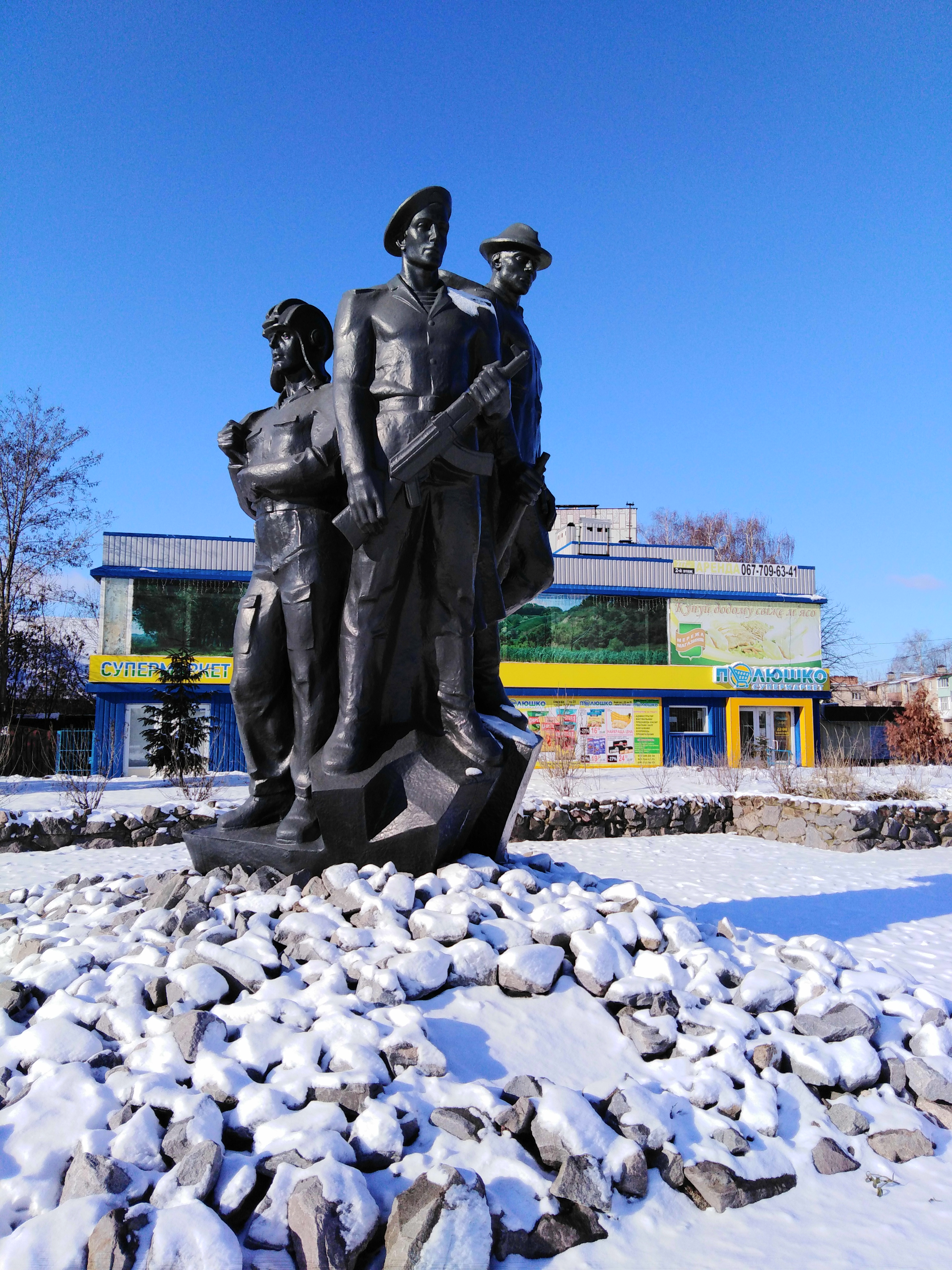
Monument to soldiers-internationalists who participated in the Soviet-Afghan war

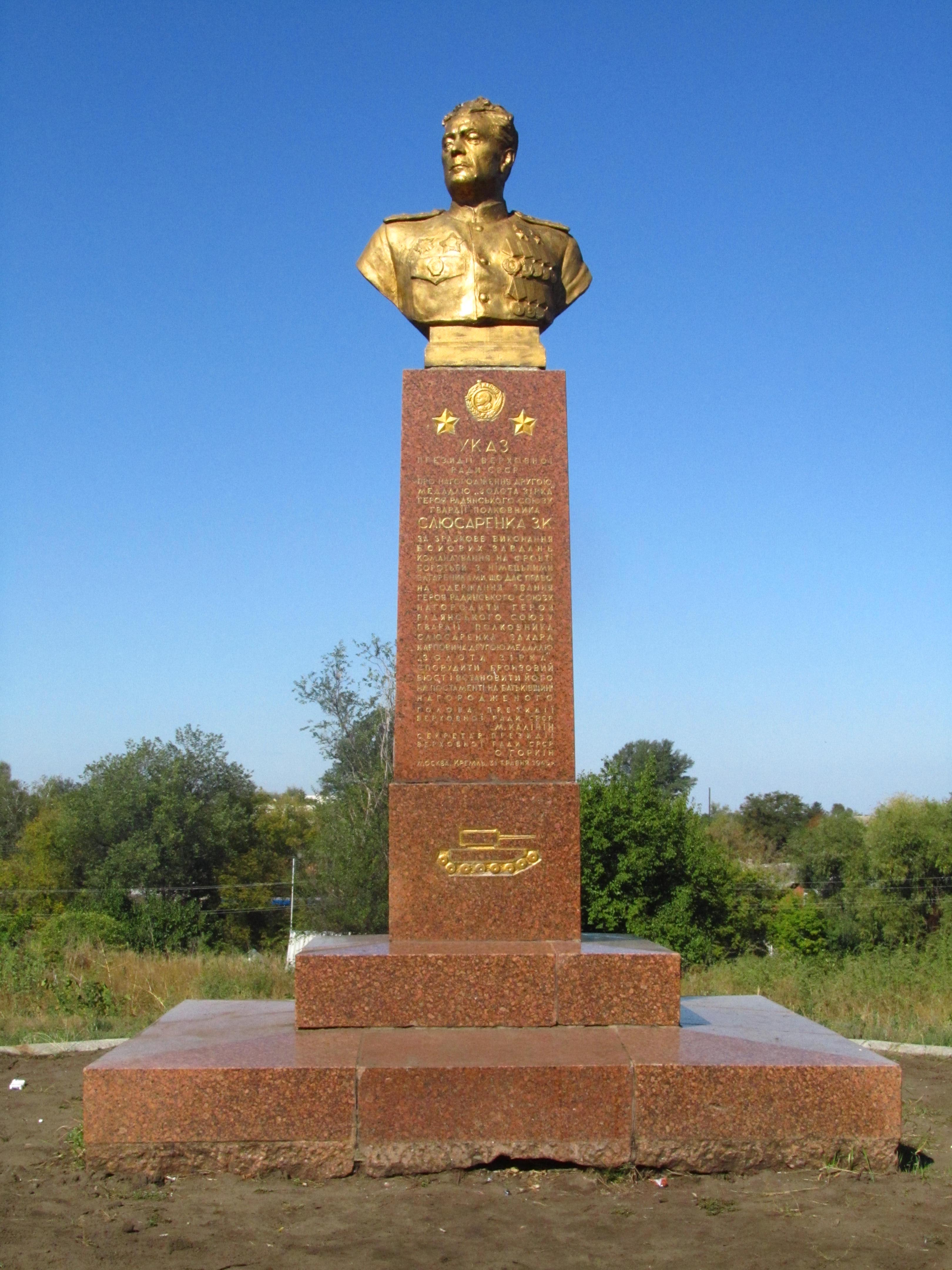
Monument twice to the Hero of the Soviet Union Zakhar Slyusarenko

== Gallery ==
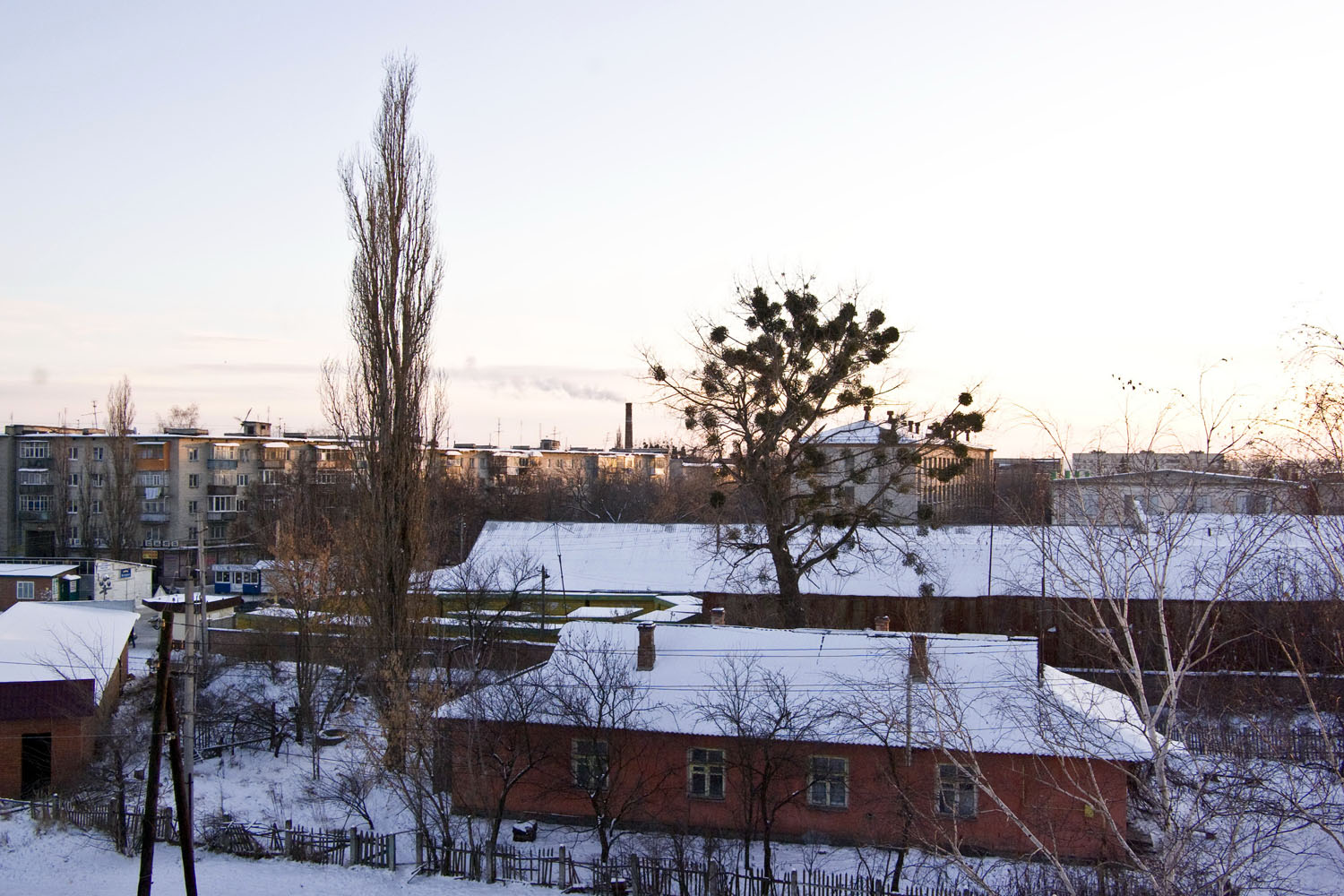
Zmijiv skyline

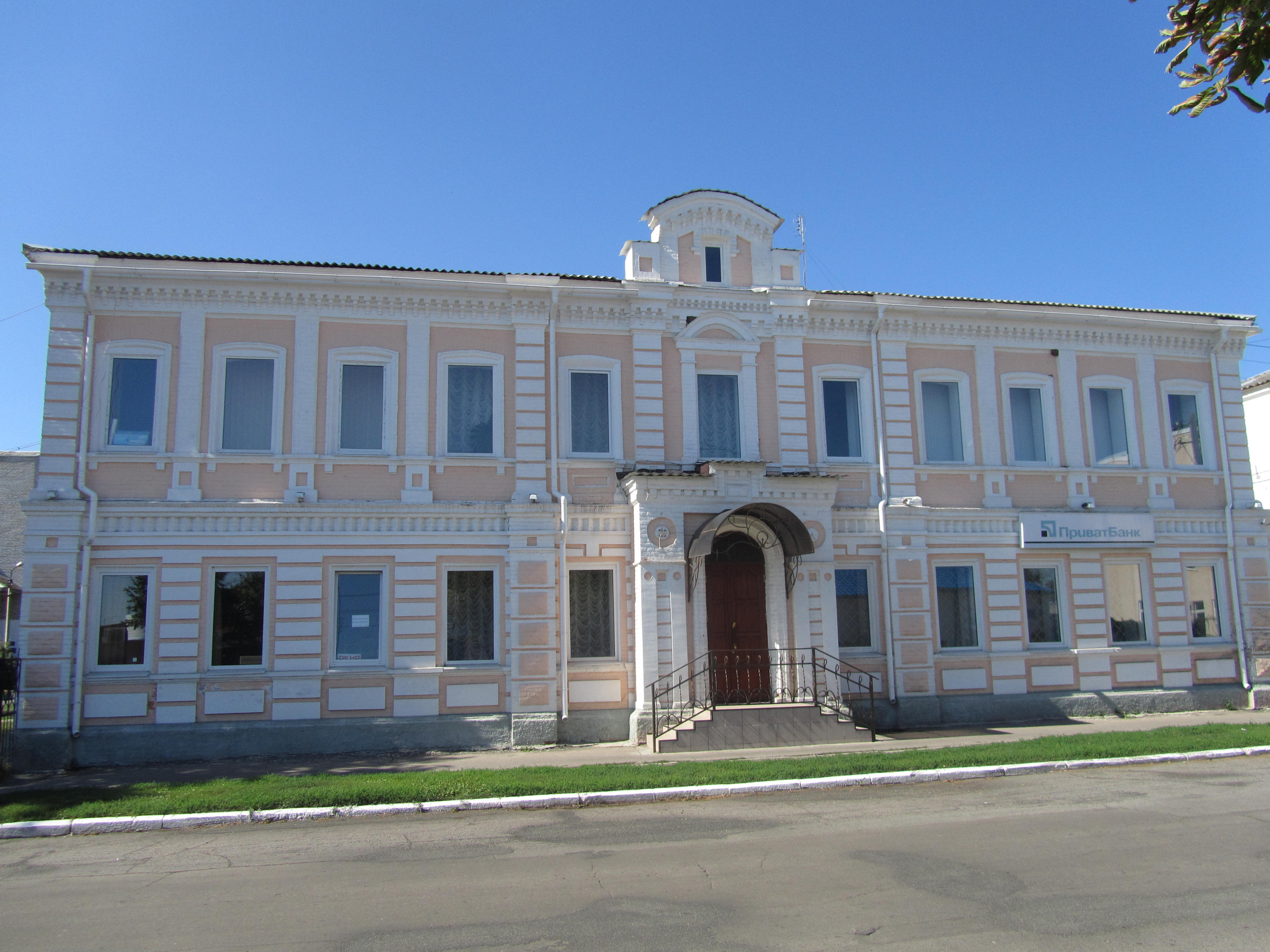
Old building

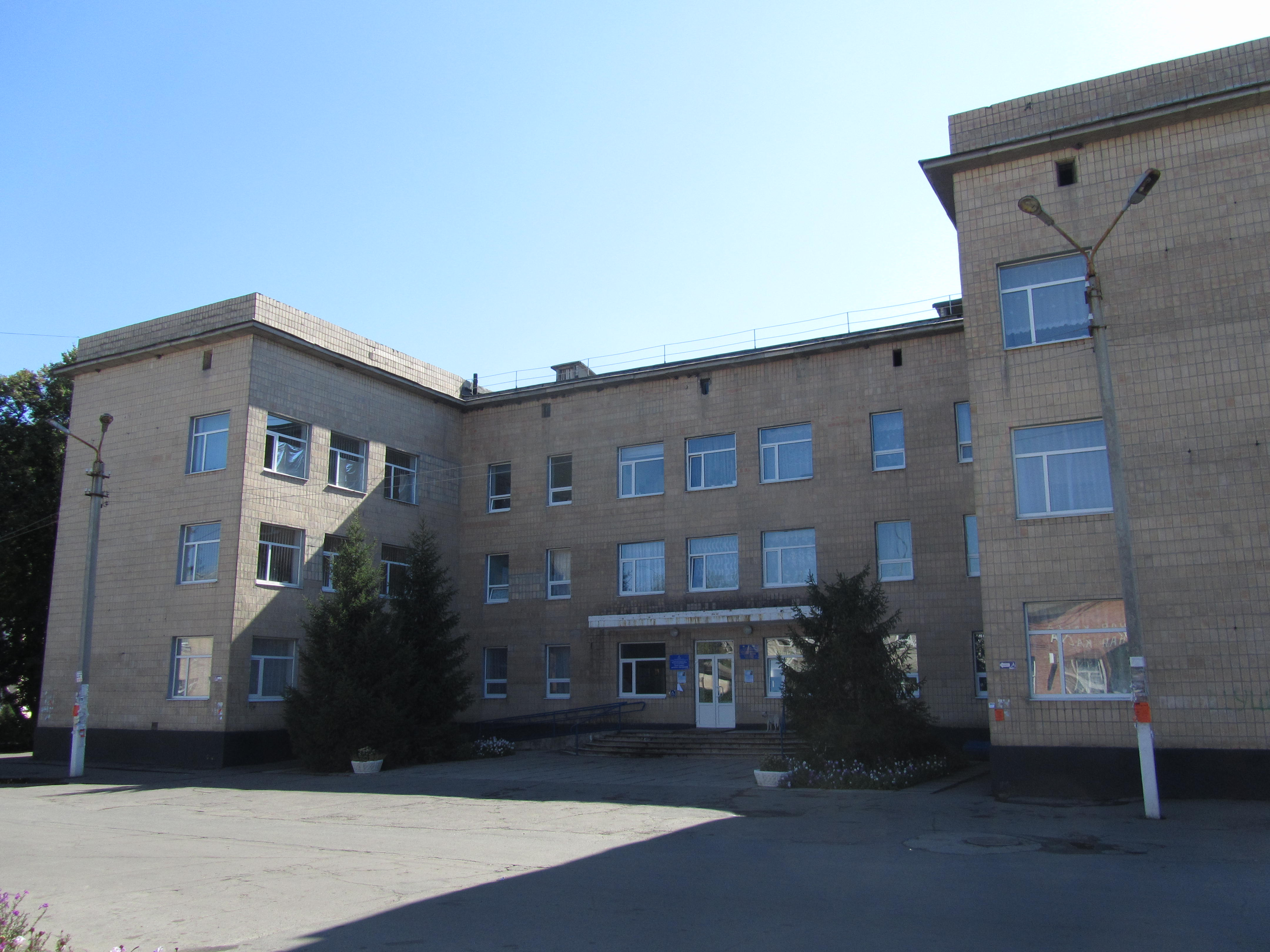
Zmiiv central hospital

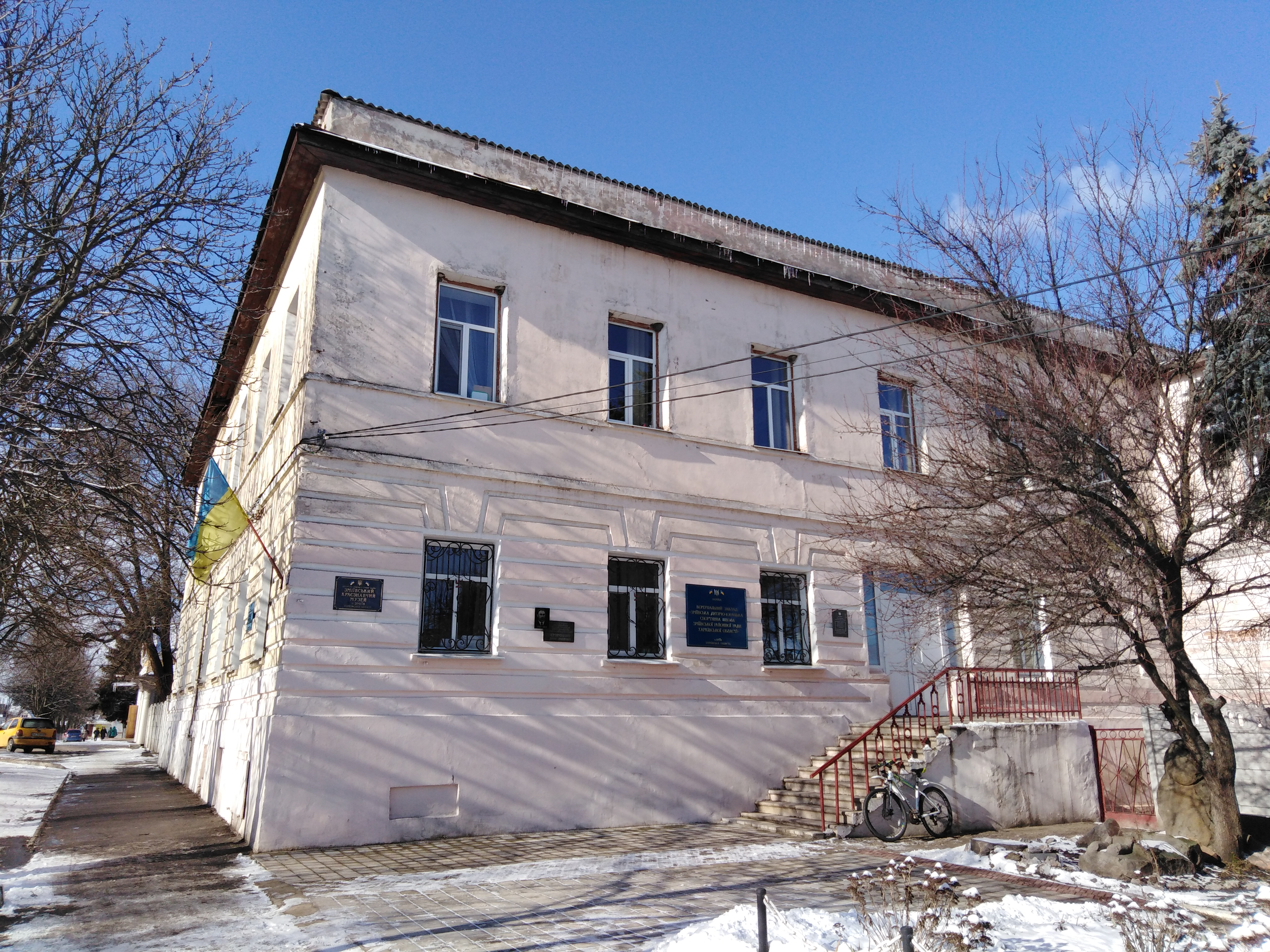
Zmiiv Museum of Local Lore

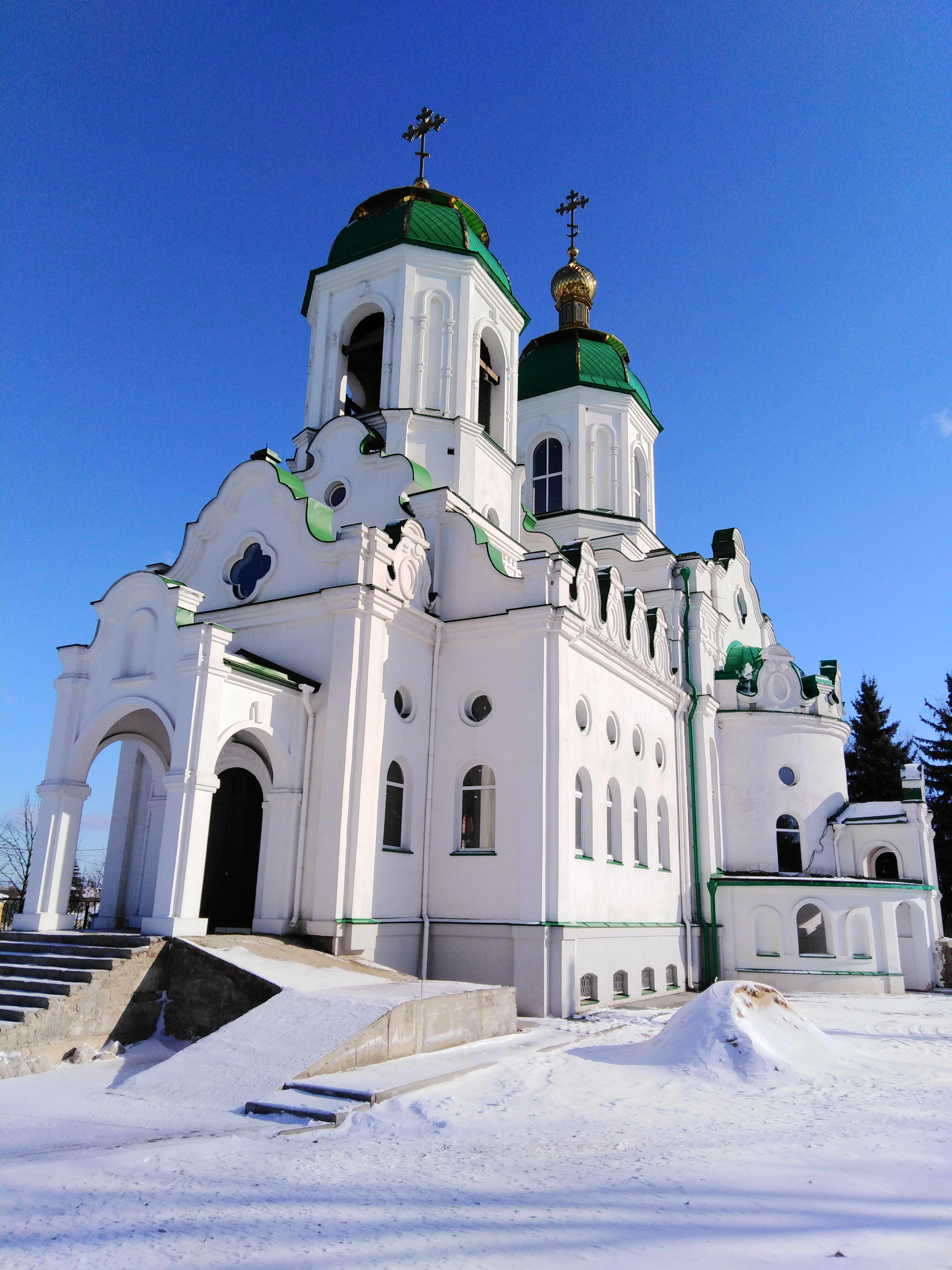
Church of the Holy Trinity

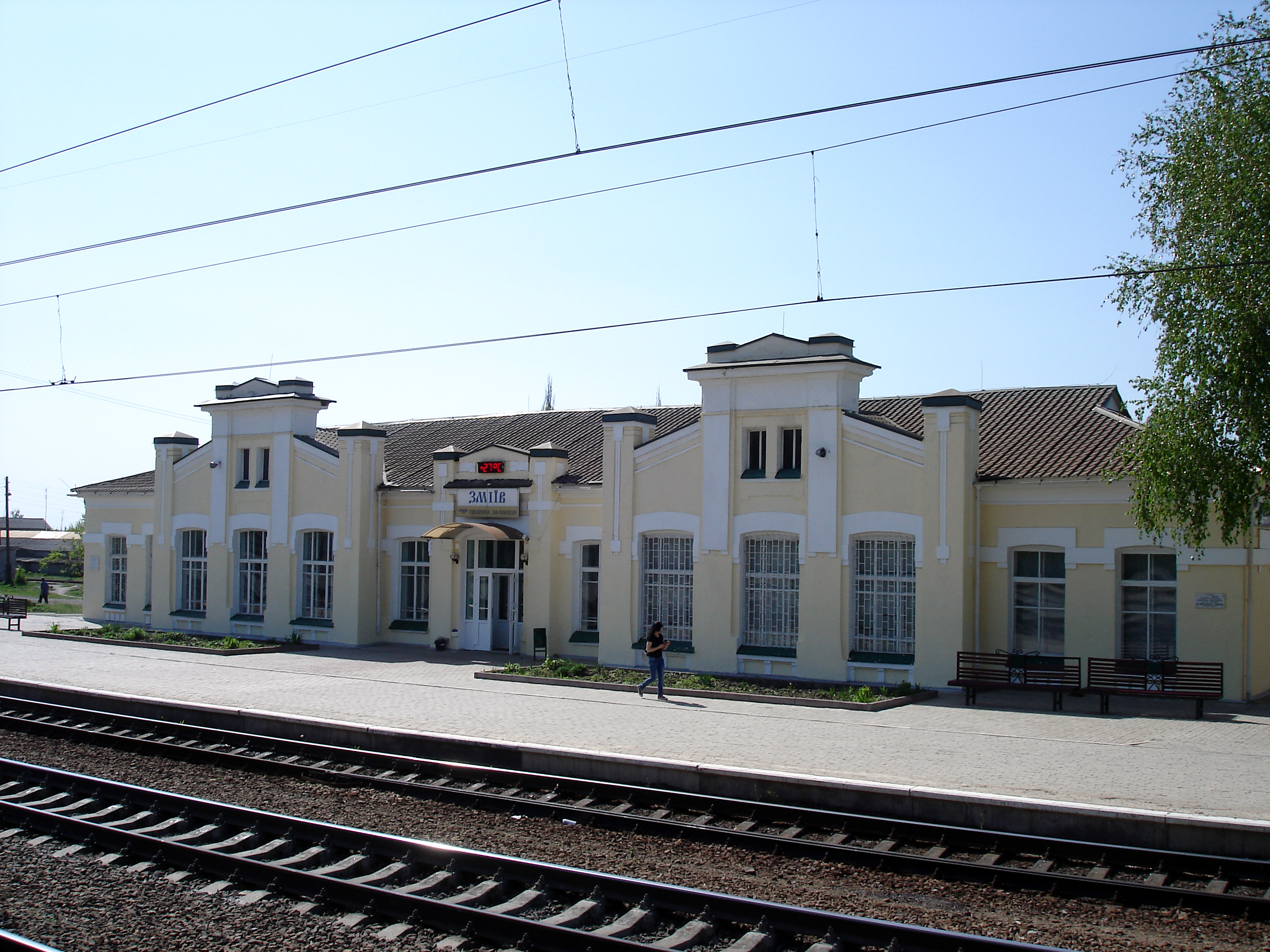
Zmiiv railway station

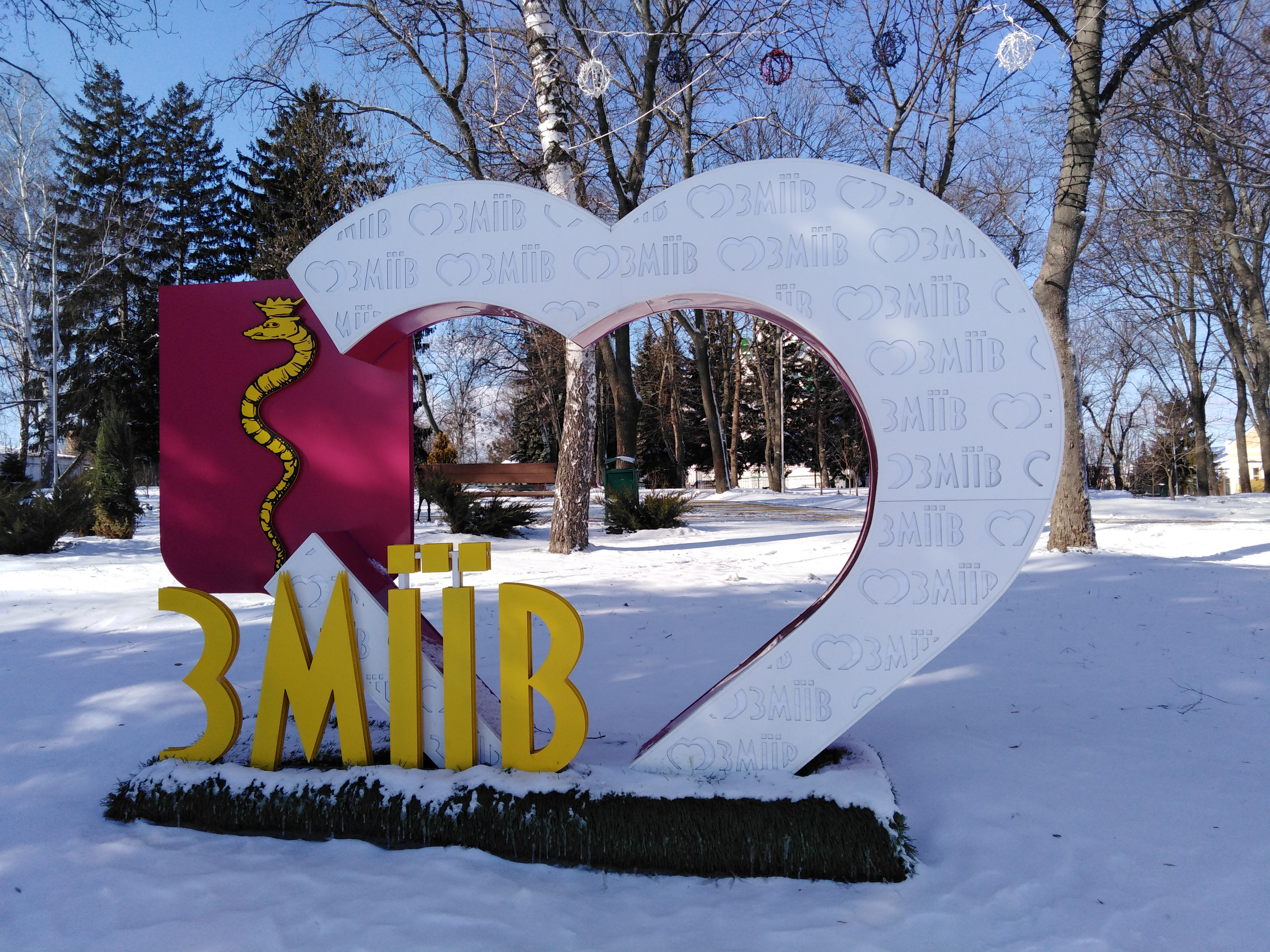
Installation "I love Zmiiv"

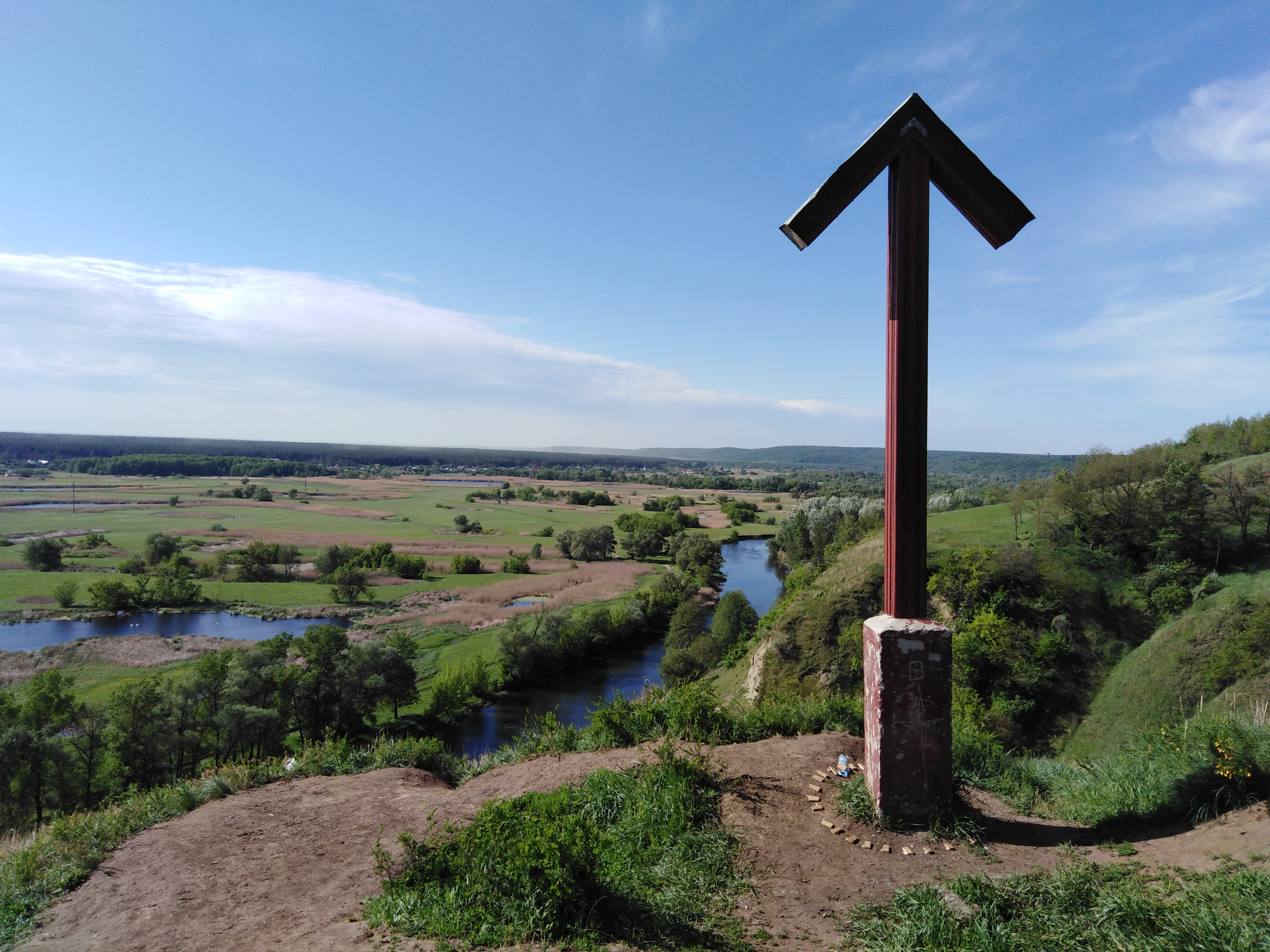
Zmiiv cliffs

== Notable residents ==
- Zakhar Slyusarenko, Soviet Army
- Igor Volk, cosmonaut and test pilot
- Ruslan Polovinko, helicopter pilot and lieutenant, awarded the title of National Hero of Azerbaijan
- Ivan Deriuhin, Soviet modern pentathlete and Olympic Champion
- Serhiy Pylypchuk, footballer
- Yevhen Murayev, is a pro-Russian Ukrainian politician and media owner. He is the current leader of the political party Nashi.
