= Persecution of Jehovah's Witnesses in Russia =

The persecution of Jehovah's Witnesses in Russia refers to the Russian government's persecution of the Jehovah's Witnesses religious group. Following the collapse of the Soviet Union in 1991, Jehovah's Witnesses became legal after a long period of being banned, though have still faced widespread government interference in their activities. Jehovah's Witnesses were deported en masse to Siberia in 1951 under Stalin via Operation North. In 2009, the Supreme Court of Russia upheld a ruling that declared 34 pieces of Jehovah's Witness literature extremist, and in 2015, customs authorities seized a shipment of their Bibles.

== Recent persecution ==
Russian anti-extremism laws were extended to non-violent groups in 2007 and Jehovah's Witnesses were banned in the port city of Taganrog in 2009 after a local court ruled the organization guilty of inciting religious hatred by "propagating the exclusivity and supremacy" of their religious beliefs. On December 8, 2009, the Supreme Court of Russia upheld the ruling of the lower courts which pronounced 34 pieces of Jehovah's Witness literature extremist, including their magazine The Watchtower. Jehovah's Witnesses claim this ruling affirms a misapplication of a federal law on anti-extremism. The ruling upheld the confiscation of property of Jehovah's Witnesses in Taganrog. The chairman of the presiding committee of the Administrative Center of Jehovah's Witnesses in Russia, Vasily Kalin, said, "I am very concerned that this decision will open a new era of opposition against Jehovah's Witnesses, whose right to meet in peace, to access religious literature and to share the Christian hope contained in the Gospels, is more and more limited." On December 1, 2015, a Rostov Regional Court convicted 16 Jehovah's Witnesses of practicing extremism in Taganrog, with five given 5 1/2-year suspended sentences and the remainder were issued fines they were not required to pay.

On May 5, 2015, customs authorities in Russia seized a shipment containing Bibles published by Jehovah's Witnesses. Russian customs officials in Vyborg held up a shipment of 2,013 Bibles on July 13, 2015. Customs authorities confiscated three of the Bibles, sent them to an expert to study the Bibles to determine whether they contained extremist language, and impounded the rest of the shipment. On July 21, 2015, the Russian Federation Ministry of Justice added Jehovah's Witnesses' official website to the Federal List of Extremist Materials, making it a criminal offense to promote the website from within the country and requiring internet providers throughout Russia to block access to the site.

=== 2017 ban and arrests ===
In 2017, Jehovah's Witnesses were banned in Russia due to "extremist" activities. On April 4, 2017, UN Special Rapporteur on Freedom of Opinion and Expression David Kaye, UN Special Rapporteur on Freedoms of Peaceful Assembly and Association Maina Kiai, and UN Special Rapporteur on Freedom of Religion and Belief Ahmed Shaheed condemned Russia's desire to ban Jehovah's Witnesses. On April 20, 2017, the Supreme Court of Russia issued a verdict upholding the claim from the country's Justice Ministry that Jehovah's Witnesses' activity violated laws on "extremism". The ruling liquidated the group's Russian headquarters in Saint Petersburg and all of its 395 local religious organizations, banning their activity and ordering their property to be seized by the state. According to the human rights organization Forum 18, this is the first time a court has ruled a registered national centralized religious organization as "extremist". Many countries and international organizations have spoken out against Russia's religious abuses of Jehovah's Witnesses. An article in Newsweek stated, "Russia's decision to ban Jehovah's Witnesses in the country shows the 'paranoia' of Vladimir Putin's government, according to the chair of the United States Commission on International Religious Freedom (USCIRF)." The United States Holocaust Memorial Museum also expressed deep concern over Russia's treatment of Jehovah's Witnesses. In May 2017, armed Federal Security Services (FSB) officers arrested Dennis Christensen, a 46-year-old Danish citizen, at a hall in Oryol on charges related to extremism. On February 6, 2019, he was found guilty and sentenced to six years in prison.

In at least two instances, arrests have involved torture: in Surgut in 2019, and in Irkutsk (by OMON officers) in 2021. On February 24, 2021, a Russian court in the Republic of Khakassia sentenced 69-year-old Valentina Baranovskaya to two years in prison for taking part in religious activities that have been banned in Russia. She is the first female member of the denomination to be imprisoned in Russia since their activities were banned in 2017. Her 46-year-old son Roman Baranovsky was also sentenced to six years in prison. According to the Watch Tower Society, the Supreme Court denied their appeal on May 24, 2021, and added restrictions to be imposed on them after their release. Commenting on the sentence, the USCIRF tweeted that the sentencing of an elderly woman in poor health marks a "new low in Russia's brutal campaign against religious freedom."

=== European Court of Human Rights cases ===
In June 2010, the European Court of Human Rights finished the case of Jehovah's Witnesses of Moscow and Others v. Russia when Russia didn't allow re-registering of their organization, and stated that Russia violated Article 9 (freedom of thought, conscience, and religion), Article 11 (freedom of assembly and association), and Article 6 § 1 (right to a fair trial within a reasonable time) of the European Convention on Human Rights.

In February 2022, the European Court of Human Rights finished two cases - Cheprunovy and Others v. Russia, regarding home and church centre searches by the FSB - and Zharinova v. Russia, regarding door-to-door preaching and subsequent actions of the police. ECHR holds that Russia violated articles 5 (right to liberty and security) and 9 (freedom of thought, conscience, and religion) of the European Convention on Human Rights. In June 2022, the European Court of Human Rights finished the case Taganrog LRO and Others v. Russia and stated that Russia violated articles 5 (right to liberty and security), 9 (freedom of thought, conscience, and religion), 10 (freedom of expression), and 11 (freedom of assembly and association) of the European Convention on Human Rights, and also Article 5 (right to liberty and security) and Article 1 of Protocol No. 1 (protection of property).

== See also ==
- Trial of the Sixteen (2011–2015)
- Persecution of Jehovah's Witnesses
- Jehovah's Witnesses and governments
- Supreme Court cases involving Jehovah's Witnesses by country
- List of Wikipedia pages banned in Russia
