= Karpivka, Crimea =

Village in Crimea

Karpivka Карпівка
- Village
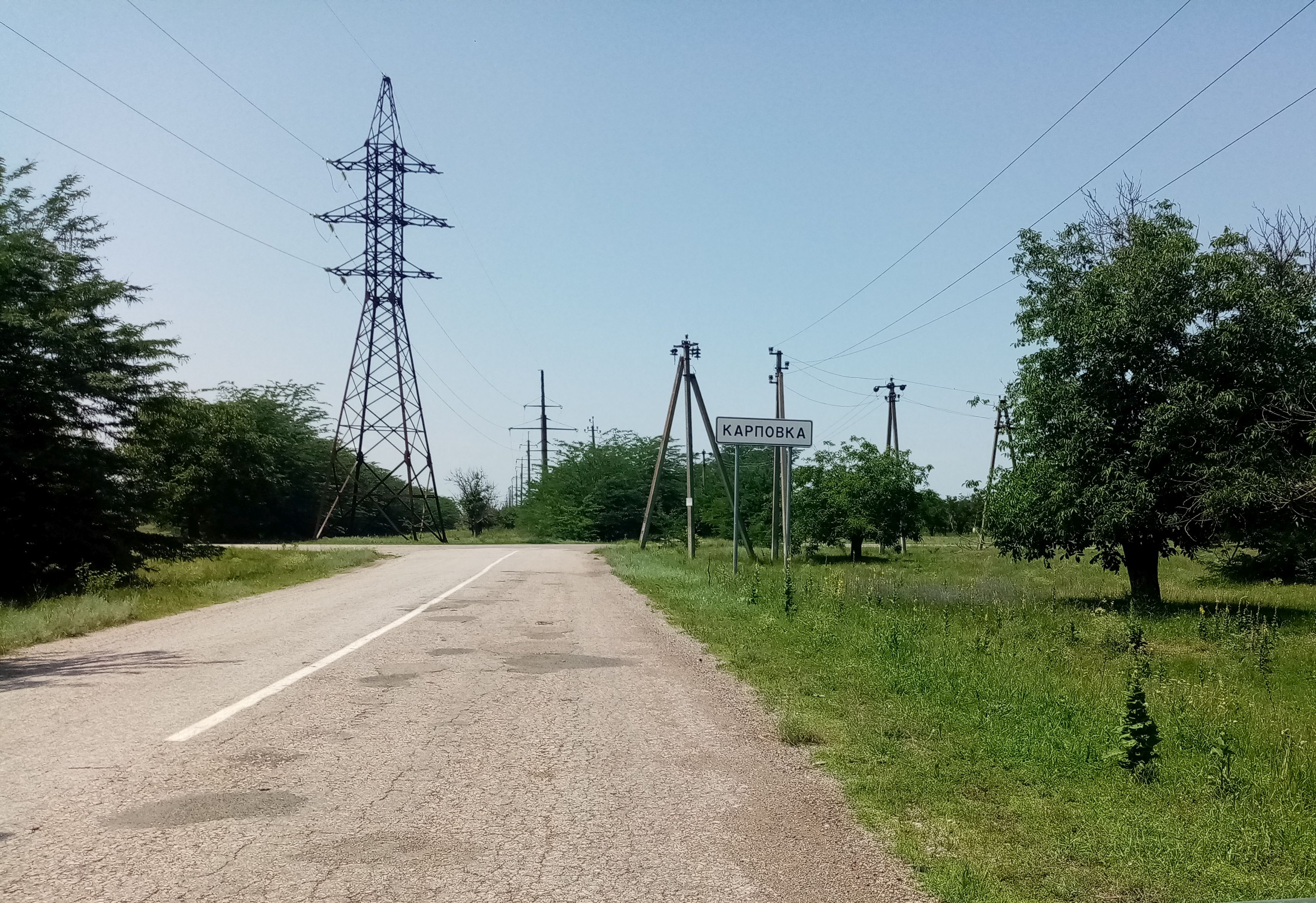
- Interactive map of Karpivka
- Karpivka in Crimea
- Coordinates: 45°31′21″N 34°04′26″E
- Country: Disputed: Ukraine (de jure); Russia (de facto)
- Oblast: (Autonomous Republic of Crimea) Crimea^{1}
- Raion: Krasnohvardiiske Raion
- Elevation: 34 m (112 ft)

Population (2014)
  - Total: 867
- Time zone: UTC+4 (MSK)
- Postal code: 97011
- Area code: +380 6556
- ^{1} Autonomous Republic of Crimea (de jure) or Republic of Crimea (de facto), depending on jurisdiction.

Karpivka (Ukrainian: Карпівка; Russian: Карповка; Crimean Tatar: Qaravul Canğara) is a village in Krasnohvardiiske Raion, Crimea. Population: 867 (2014 Census).
