= Krasna Poliana, Kharkiv Oblast =

Krasna Poliana Красна Поляна
- Village
- Location within Kharkiv Oblast Location within Ukraine
- Country: Ukraine
- Oblast: Kharkiv Oblast
- Raion: Chuhuiv Raion
- Hromada: Zmiiv urban hromada

Population (2001)
  - Total: 426
- Postal code: 63411

Krasna Poliana (Ukrainian: Красна Поляна) is a village in northeastern Ukraine, located in Zmiiv urban hromada, Chuhuiv Raion, Kharkiv Oblast.

== History ==
As a result of the Holodomor, a manmade famine in Soviet Ukraine from 1932 to 1933, the number of documented victims in Krasna Poliana (as well as Vodiane and Kostiantynivka) was 246 people.

On 12 June 2020, by an edict of the Ukrainian parliament, the village became part of Zmiiv urban hromada. On 17 July the same year, Krasna Poliana, as well as the rest of the hromada, was reassigned from Zmiiv Raion which was abolished, to the Chuhuiv Raion.
