= Krasna Poliana, Krasnohvardiiske Raion, Crimea =

Village in Crimea, Ukraine

Coordinates: 45°28′25″N 34°07′37″E

Krasna Poliana (Ukrainian: Красна Поляна; Russian: Кра́сная Поля́на), known as Kara-Chakmak (Crimean Tatar: Qara Çaqmaq, Къара Чакъмакъ) before 1948, is a village in Krasnohvardiiske Raion, Crimea.

== Demographics ==
According to the 2001 Ukrainian census, the native languages of the population were 64.26% Russian, 20.8 Crimean Tatar, 13.7% Ukrainian, and 0.87% other languages.

== History ==
Since 21 March 2014, it, along with the rest of Crimea, has been occupied by Russia.
