= Krasnohvardiiske Raion =

Coordinates: 45°29′41″N 34°17′41″E

Krasnohvardiiske Raion: Красногвардійський район (Ukrainian); Красногвардейский район (Russian); Krasnogvardeysky District; Къурман районы (Crimean Tatar); Qurman rayonı (Latin)
- Raion
- Kurman Raion; Курманський район (Ukrainian)
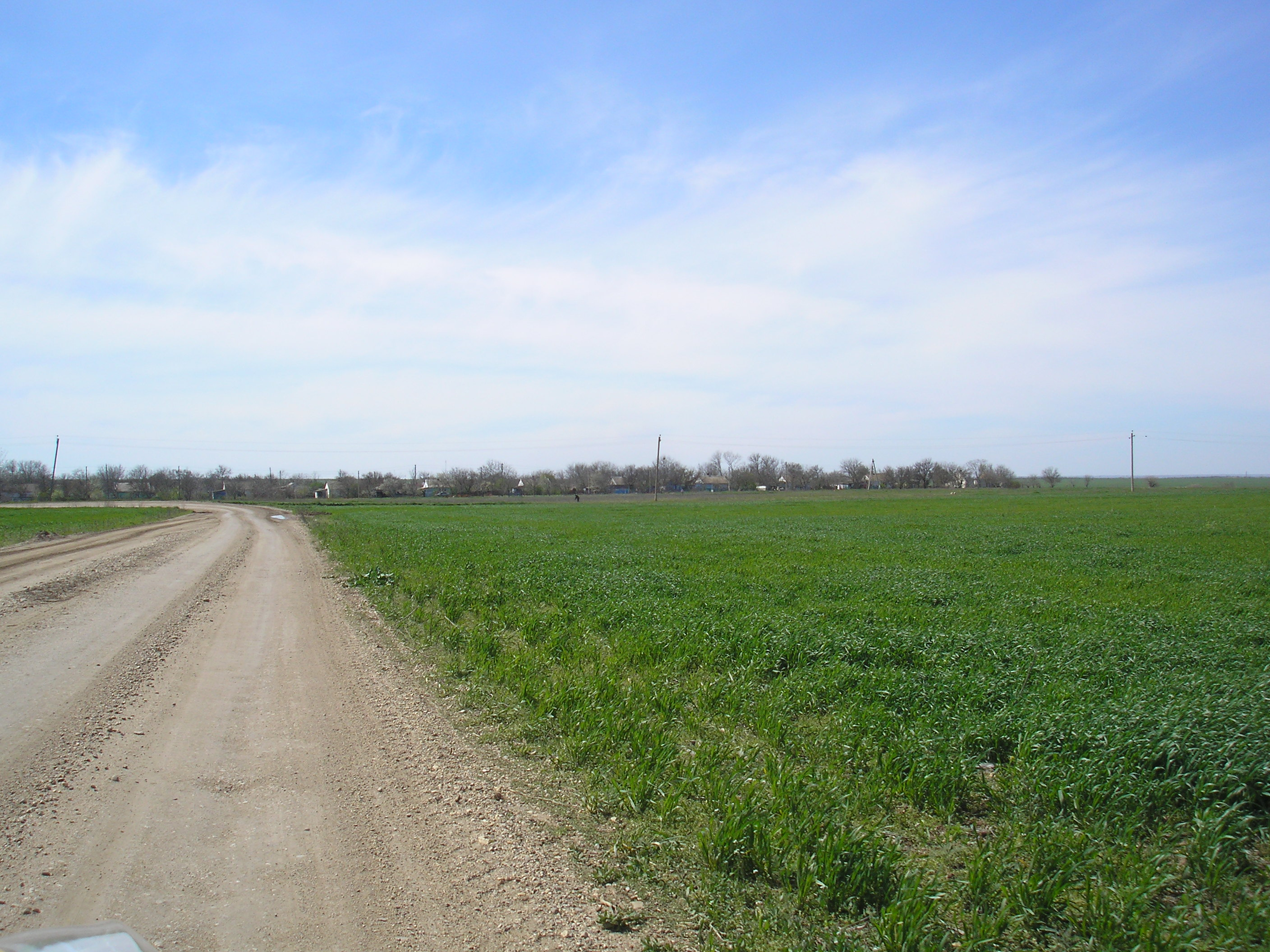
- Village Hryhoriivka, Krasnohvardiiske District

- Flag Coat of arms
- Raion location within Crimea
- Republic: Crimea
- Capital: Krasnohvardiiske
- Subdivisions: List: 0 cities; 2 towns; 82 villages

Area
  - Total: 1,766 km^{2} (682 sq mi)

Population (2014)
  - Total: 83,135
  - Density: 47.08/km^{2} (121.9/sq mi)
- Time zone: UTC+2
  - Summer (DST): +3
- Dialing code: +380-6556

The Krasnohvardiiske Raion (Ukrainian: Красногвардійський район), also known as the Krasnogvardeysky District (Russian: Красногвардейский район), now named by the Ukrainian government as the Kurman Raion (Ukrainian: Курманський район; Crimean Tatar: Къурман районы, Qurman rayonı) (Note: The renaming has been effected by Ukraine's decommunization laws, but as Crimea is outside of Ukrainian control, this decision has had little practical effect.), is one of the 25 regions of the Autonomous Republic of Crimea, Ukraine, occupied by Russia as the Republic of Crimea. The administrative centre of the raion is the urban-type settlement of Krasnohvardiiske. Krasnohvardiiske Raion is located in the central part of Crimea. The raion has a population of 83,135 (2014 Census).

== Demographics ==
As of the Ukrainian national census in 2001, the raion had a population of 93,782 inhabitants. The population of the raion is diverse. People with an ethnic Russian background make up the largest group (48.7%), followed by ethnic Ukrainians (29.3%) and Crimean Tatars (16.7%). Other notable groups are Belarusians, Armenians, Germans and Tatars. The exact ethnic composition was as follows:

Ethnic groups (2001)
	percent
Russians	48.7%
Ukrainians	29.3%
Crimean Tatars	16.7%
Belarusians	2.2%
Tatars	1.1%
Armenians	0.4%
Koreans	0.3%
Germans	0.3%
Gypsies	0.3%
Uzbeks	0.3%
Poles	0.2%
Azerbaijanis	0.2%
others	1.1%

=== Settlements ===
The raion contains two urban-type settlements: Krasnohvardiiske and Oktiabrske, and eighty-two villages, including:

- Kalinine
- Karpivka
- Krasna Poliana

== History ==
=== Russian annexation of Crimea ===
In 2014, Russia unilaterally and illegally annexed Crimea from Ukraine. This has not been recognized by the international community, but Russia has continued to occupy the peninsula.

=== 2020 Ukrainian administrative reform ===
In July 2020, Ukraine conducted an administrative reform throughout its de jure territory. This included Crimea, which was still occupied by Russia. Crimea was reorganized from 14 raions and 11 municipalities into 10 raions, with municipalities abolished altogether. The territory of Kurman Raion was expanded to also include the territories of Pervomaiske Raion, but has not yet been implemented due to the ongoing Russian occupation.
