= Trial of the Sixteen (2011–2015) =

2011-2015 trial of Jehovah's Witnesses in Taganrog, Rostov Oblast, Russia

The Trial of the Sixteen was a 2011–2015 trial of Jehovah's Witnesses in the city of Taganrog, Russia. Sixteen Jehovah's Witnesses were arrested and charged with organising a criminal group and participating in extremist activities involving minors.

As a result of the first trial, lasting from 2011 to 2014, seven of the sixteen were found guilty and sentenced. In August 2014, both the defence and prosecution appealed, and on 12 December 2014, the original verdict was discarded. On 26 December 2014, the case was sent to retrial, and ended with another verdict on 30 November 2015 finding all sixteen defendants guilty. On 18 March 2016, the sentence was confirmed by Russia's Judicial Collegium.

== Prelude ==
On 11 June 2009, the prosecutor's office of Rostov Oblast demanded that the Rostov Oblast Court ban the Taganrog chapter of the Jehovah's Witnesses (JW), claiming the organisation was extremist. Additional demands by the prosecutor's office included the banning of JW activities in Taganrog and the Neklinovsky and Matveyevo-Kurgansky districts, the seizure of JW property by government authorities, and the inclusion of JW materials on the Federal List of Extremist Materials.

As justification for banning the organisation, the prosecutor's office stated that Jehovah's Witnesses refuse medical care for religious reasons, refuse civic obligations (such as conscription), noted the involvement of minors in the organisation's activities, and claimed that they were responsible for the destruction of family order. Additionally, the prosecutor's office accused JW of degrading human dignity and inciting inter-religious hatred by promoting the supremacy of Christianity.

Prior to the prosecutor's office requesting a ban on the Taganrog Jehovah's Witnesses, the latter had on 31 October 2007 been issued a warning about extremist activity, which was not appealed nor cancelled. By the next year, they had already resumed the publishing of religious material. According to the prosecutor's office, this material contained extremists. The prosecutor's office also stated that the Taganrog JW had been operating in the Neklinovsky and Matveyevo-Kurgansky districts, outside the city of Taganrog, where they were allowed to operate per their charter as a local religious organisation (LRO).

On 11 September 2009, the Rostov Oblast Court acquiesced, agreeing to some of the requests of the prosecutor's office. The property of the Taganrog JW was seized, and 34 of 68 publications the prosecutor's office had requested a ban on were outlawed. Among the banned publications were selected issues of the magazines Awake! and The Watchtower, as well as the book What Does the Bible Really Teach? and the brochures Should You Believe in the Trinity? and Blood to Save Your Life?.

The Taganrog JW at first responded by filing a complaint directly to the Supreme Court of Russia. However, on 8 December 2009, the Supreme Court dismissed the complaint, allowing the partial ban to go ahead. Subsequently, the Taganrog JW appealed to the European Court of Human Rights against the Supreme Court's decision on 1 June 2010. On 7 September 2010, the Supreme Court refused to satisfy a complaint from the German publishing house Wachtturm Bibel- und Traktat-Gesellschaft der Zeugen Jehovas challenging the Rostov Oblast Court's ban on 34 JW publications.

== First trial (2011–2014) ==
On 5 August 2011, a criminal case was opened against unidentified persons. On the basis of this case, the homes of 19 Jehovah's Witnesses in Taganrog and the nearby area were searched on 25 August 2011. On 20 February 2012, an edict was issued banning the leader of the Taganrog JW, Nikolay Trotsyuk, from travelling. In the days after, similar edicts were issued against other members of the community. On 4 February 2012, a second criminal case was initiated against the defendants, who were accused of participating in an extremist group. Both cases were later merged into one proceeding.

In August 2011, Ivan Bondarenko, senior investigator for the Ministry of Internal Affairs in the Southern Federal District, challenged the choice of lawyers by the Taganrog JW, a decision subsequently appealed to the Taganrog City Court. In October 2012, the challenge against the JW lawyers was declared unlawful. As a result, the procedure for bringing charges against Jehovah's Witnesses in May and June 2012, as well as subsequent investigative actions, was void. The next month, the Taganrog JW was charged once again. The Rostov Oblast Court upheld the decision of the Taganrog City Court to charge the Taganrog JW on 11 and 19 December 2012.

On 12 April 2013, sixteen members of the Taganrog JW community were indicted. Of the indicted, the four most senior members of the defendants' congregation (Note: Nikolay Trotsyuk, Alexander Skvortsov, Alexei Koptev and Yuri Baklushin.) were charged under Section 1 of Article 282.2 (Note: Organising the activities of an extremist organisation.) and Section 4 of Article 150 (Note: Involving a minor in the committing of a crime.) of the Criminal Code of Russia, while the twelve other defendants (Note: Sergey Trotsyuk, Roman Voloshchuk, Andrey Goncharov, Oksana Goncharova, Vyacheslav Shchekalev, Karen Minasyan, Kiril Chetverikov, Vladimir Kozhukhov, Vladislav Kruglikov, Tatyana Kravchenko, Vladimir Moiseyenko and Kiril Kravchenko.) were charged under Section 2 of Article 282.2 (Note: Participation in the activities of an extremist organisation.) of the Criminal Code. According to an investigation by state authorities, the defendants continued to participate in the organisation of JW activity in Taganrog despite the ban. In fact, in spite of the Taganrog JW's ban, membership increased to 200.

Per the state investigation, the defendants held meetings at which they expressed ideas mocking the dignity of religion, incited hatred for the "Christian world", promoted the supremacy of their religion over others, encouraged conscientious objection and the refusal of medical treatment to others, and involved minors in the activities of a recognised extremist organisation.

According to the Sova Center, as of 2013 the Trial of the Sixteen was the largest anti-extremist case in Russia in terms of the number of defendants. At the time, two other cases in Taganrog were also being pursued against Jehovah's Witnesses, with a total of five other defendants. All three cases were handled by the same investigator, Ivan Bondarenko. According to the Ministry of Internal Affairs, the cause for the separation of the cases was that each case concerned different congregations of Jehovah's Witnesses.

=== Hearings ===
The first hearings took place on 13 and 20 May 2013. According to a state investigation, the defendants continued the activities of the community in Taganrog, despite its ban. The accusation was based on results from a hidden camera installed by special services in the area where Taganrog JW services were held - a violation of the law, as the LRO charter had been declared null. The argument from the defence was that the nullification of the LRO charter did not deny them their constitutional right to freedom of religion, and the law's permitting of joint practice of religion without a charter.

The prosecutor's office pushed for a sentence of six years in a penal colony and a fine of ₽100,000 for the four senior witnesses, as well as fines ranging from ₽20,000 to ₽70,000 for the other defendants. The prosecution's presentation of evidence ended on 24 March 2014, and was followed by the defence's presentation of evidence and arguments. On 16 July 2014, the defendants delivered their last word, with none pleading guilty.

The announcement of the verdict was originally scheduled for 28 July 2014, but was later moved back a day. That day, however, the judge did not have enough time to announce the verdict in full, and so it was once again moved back a day, to 30 July 2014.

On 30 July 2014, the verdict was announced in full. Seven defendants were found guilty. The four senior members of the congregation were found guilty of "organisation of the activities of an extremist organisation," and "involving a minor in the committing of a crime," and given a suspended sentence of 5 to 5.5 years, in addition to a fine of ₽100,000, though they were not required to be paid due to the expiration of the statute of limitations. The three other defendants found guilty were convicted of "participation in the activities of an extremist organisation," and sentenced from fines ranging from ₽50,000 to ₽60,000, though they were not required to be paid due to the expiration of the statute of limitations. The remaining nine defendants were acquitted.

== Second trial (2014–2015) ==
On 8 August 2014, all sixteen defendants appealed the ruling of the Taganrog City Court, including those acquitted. They disagreed with the rationale of the court's decision. The same day, the Rostov Oblast prosecutor's office also appealed the ruling. On 12 December 2014, the Rostov Oblast Court overturned the trial's verdict. On 26 December 2014, the case was again submitted to the Taganrog City Court for retrial by judge Aleksey Vasyutchenko. Preliminary hearings were held on 12 January 2015, and the first hearing on 22 January. The first consideration of the case took place on 3 March 2015.

As a result of the retrial, the sentences of the defendants were toughened. On 30 November 2015, the trial ended with all sixteen defendants being found guilty. Of the four senior congregants, three were given a suspended sentence of five years and six months, while one was given a suspended sentence of five years and three months. All defendants were given fines between ₽20,000 and ₽100,000, though they were not required to be paid due to the expiration of the statute of limitations. The defendants' lawyers announced their intention to appeal the verdict, but on 17 March 2016, the Rostov Oblast Court upheld the verdict.

== Reactions ==
=== Outside Russia ===
- United States: The Embassy of the United States in Moscow expressed "deep regret" regarding the trial, expressing the view that Russia "denies the rights of minority religious groups," and criticised the vague wording of Russia's anti-extremism laws.
