= Zmiiv Raion =

Former subdivision of Kharkiv Oblast, Ukraine

Zmiiv Raion Зміївський район
- Raion
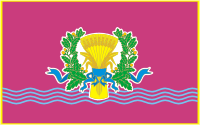
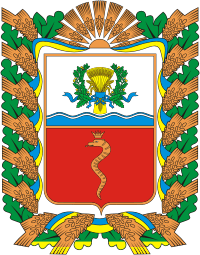
- Flag Coat of arms

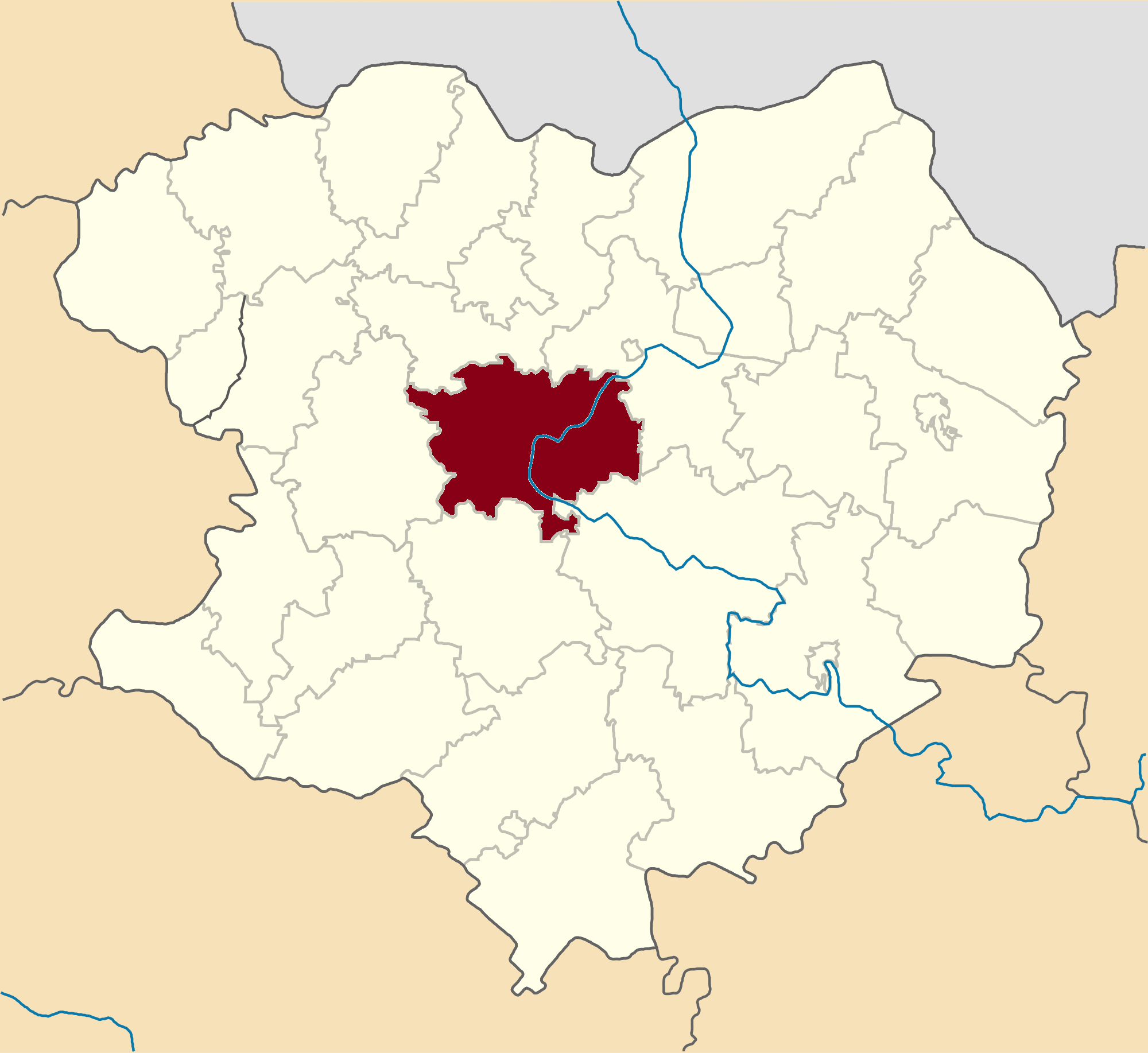
- Raion location in Kharkiv Oblast
- Coordinates: 49°39′36.471″N 36°21′41.832″E
- Country: Ukraine
- Oblast: Kharkiv Oblast
- Disestablished: 18 July 2020
- Admin. center: Zmiiv

Area
  - Total: 1,364.65 km^{2} (526.89 sq mi)

Population (2020)
  - Total: 69,135
  - Density: 50.661/km^{2} (131.21/sq mi)
- Time zone: UTC+2 (EET)
  - Summer (DST): UTC+3 (EEST)
- Website: https://web.archive.org/web/20120623113248/http://zmiivrda.gov.ua/

Zmiiv Raion (Ukrainian: Зміївський район) was a raion (district) in Kharkiv Oblast of Ukraine. Its administrative center was the town of Zmiiv. The raion was abolished on 18 July 2020 as part of the administrative reform of Ukraine, which reduced the number of raions of Kharkiv Oblast to seven. The area of Zmiiv Raion was, together with Pechenihy and Vovchansk Raions, merged into Chuhuiv Raion. The last estimate of the raion population was 69,135 (2017 est.)

At the time of disestablishment, the raion consisted of two hromada:

- Slobozhanske settlement hromada with the administration in the urban-type settlement of Slobozhanske;
- Zmiiv urban hromada with the administration in Zmiiv.
