= Borova, Izium Raion, Kharkiv Oblast =

Rural locality in Kharkiv Oblast, Ukraine

Borova Борова
- Rural settlement
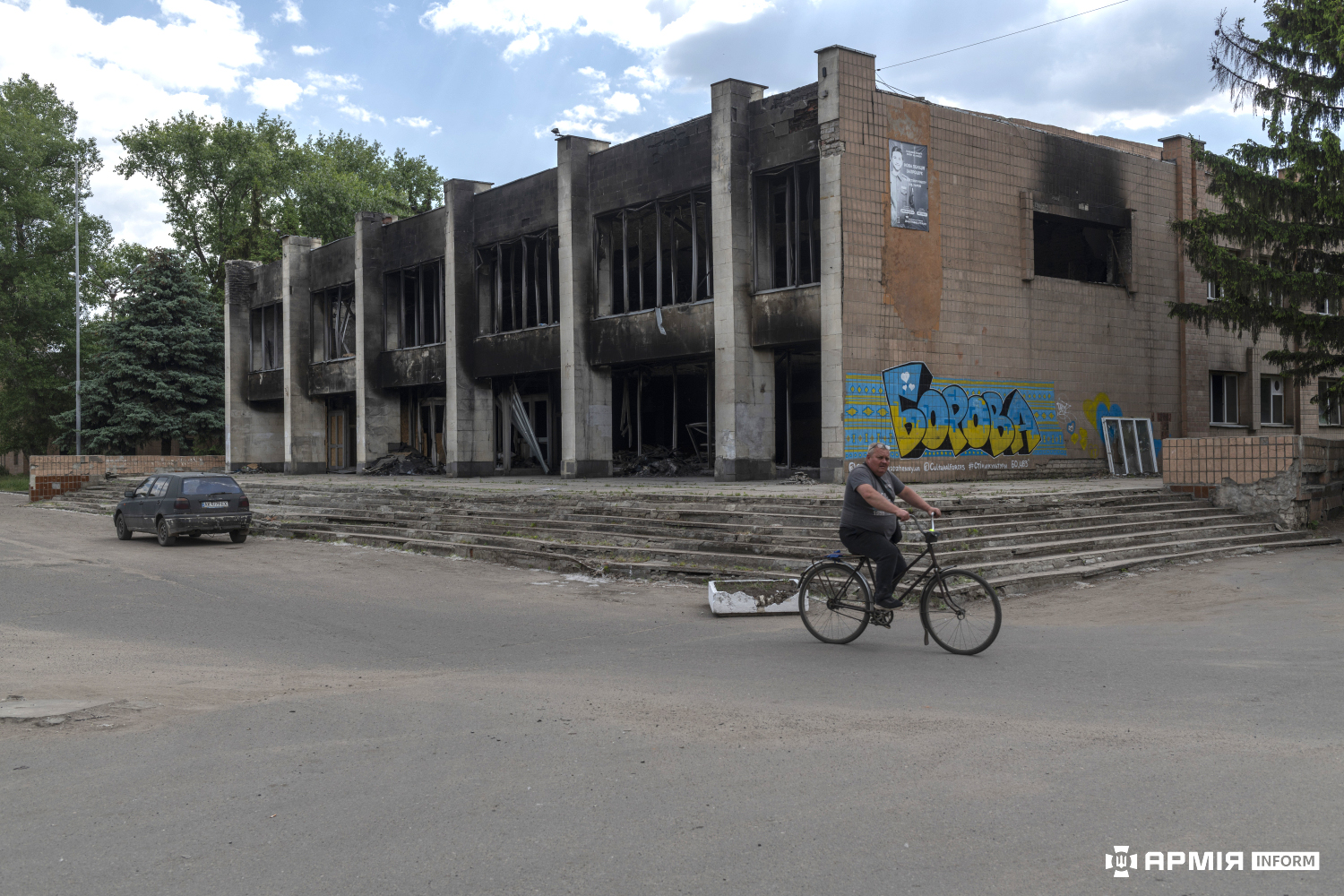
- House of culture in Borova after Russian drone attacks and bombings in 2023-2024.

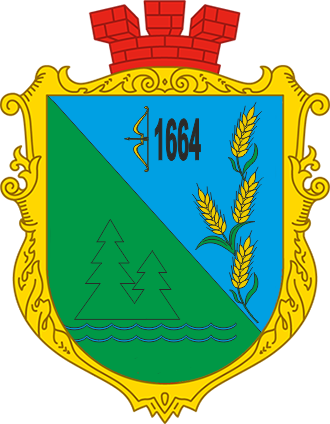
- Coat of arms
- Interactive map of Borova
- Location of Borova within Ukraine Borova (Ukraine)
- Coordinates: 49°22′54″N 37°38′27″E
- Country: Ukraine
- Oblast: Kharkiv Oblast
- Raion: Izium Raion
- Hromada: Borova settlement hromada

Population (2022)
  - Total: 5,055
- Time zone: UTC+2 (EET)
  - Summer (DST): UTC+3 (EEST)
- Postal code 1: 63800
- Postal code 2: 63807
- KATOTTH: UA63040050010023832
- Website: bor-selrada.gov.ua

Borova (Ukrainian: Борова, Russian: Боровая) is a rural settlement in Izium Raion, Kharkiv Oblast, Ukraine. It hosts the administration of Borova settlement hromada, one of the hromadas of Ukraine. Population: 5,055 (2022 estimate). Borova is located to the southeast of Kharkiv.

== Geography ==
Borova is situated on the eastern bank of Oskil Reservoir of the Oskil at the confluence of the small river Borovaya. The village stretches along the river for ~8 km. The village is separated from the reservoir by a small forest (pine).

Distance from Kharkiv via the railway 193 km, by the road 165 km. The core railway station namely Pereddonbasivska (approx. 1,5 km). Boyni and Pydliman are the nearest villages. The distance from Borova to Pydliman is about 2 km.

== History ==
=== Early history ===
The first mention of the Borova farm dates back to 1664. The village arose from the farmstead and settlement of Borova. The name comes from the name of the left tributary of the Oskil river Borovaya, which flows through the village, and the river is named in connection with the pine forest on the bank of Oskol, which stretches along the river for 20 km. In 1670, the Gorokhovatskaya Mother of God Hermitage was moved to the Borova farm. In 1794, the monastery church Nativity of the Blessed Virgin Mary was moved to a new location for the newly formed settlement of Borovaya.

The “Atlas of the Sloboda-Ukraine Governorate” compiled in 1797, indicates that the Borovaya settlement was formed on the left side of the Borovaya river from farms belonging to the Gorohovatka settlement. It had 918 inhabitants. It was part of the Gorokhovatsky volost Kupyansky Uyezd, Voronezh Governorate (for some time - part of the Izyumsky Uyezd of the Kharkov Governorate), since 1796 - the same district Sloboda Ukraine Governorate (since 1835 - Kharkov Governorate). The population of Borovaya was mainly engaged in agriculture and animal husbandry. Gardening and beekeeping were also developed. In winter, women spun flax, wool, and wove linen and cloth. Agricultural products and handicrafts were intended primarily to satisfy their own needs, but some of them went to the market. Military inhabitants paid a poll tax to the state. In their position they stood close to the state peasants. A small part of the population consisted of state peasants and single-lords.

In 1813, 21 people received permission to travel to the Caucasus to join the linear Cossacks there. In 1838, 206 men and their families went there. In 1864, there were 174 households and 1,400 residents in Borovaya. In 1897, the village had 2839 inhabitants. Since 1908, it became the volost center of the Kupyansky Uyezd in the Kharkov Governorate of the Russian Empire.

=== Soviet period ===
Soviet power was established here in January 1918. In 1934, publication of the local newspaper "Trudovaya Slava" (Labor Glory) began. During World War II, it was under German occupation from July 1942 to February 1943.

During the Great Patriotic War from July 8, 1942 to February 1, 1943, the village was occupied; during the German occupation, an underground district committee of the CP(b)U operated here. During the war, at least 935 residents fought on the front lines in the ranks of the Red Army and the Soviet Army; of these, 376 soldiers died; 935 (all) were awarded and medals of the USSR. Citizen of Borova, corporal Vasily S. Kolesnik repeated the feat of Aleksandr Matrosov in 1945, covering a pillbox embrasure with his body, for which he was posthumously awarded the title Hero of the Soviet Union.

In 1957, when the Krasnooskol Reservoir filled, the original historic farmstead of Borovaya, or Slobodka, was flooded; the population relocated to Borovaya on the western outskirts. In 1966, the population was 4,276; there were three schools, a clinic, a 100-bed hospital, a tuberculosis dispensary, a sanitary station, a bathhouse, a mill, an oil mill, an incubator station, and the Lenin collective farm with 4,500 hectares of land, 17 tractors, and 16 combines.

In 1968, Borovaya received the status of an urban-type settlement. In 1976, the population was 4,905. As of early 1978, the settlement boasted a creamery, a food processing plant, a brick factory, a poultry hatchery, a consumer services center, three comprehensive schools, three medical facilities, a community center, a club, and three libraries. In January 1989 the population was 7,396 people with 3,427 men and 3,969 women.

After Ukrainian independence, in May 1995, the Cabinet of Ministers of Ukraine approved the decision to privatize the feed mill located here In January 2013 the population was 5740 people. Until 18 July 2020, Borova was the administrative center of Borova Raion. The raion was abolished in July 2020 as part of the administrative reform of Ukraine, which reduced the number of raions of Kharkiv Oblast to seven. The area of Borova Raion was merged into Izium Raion.

=== Russo-Ukrainian War ===
==== Russian invasion of Ukraine ====
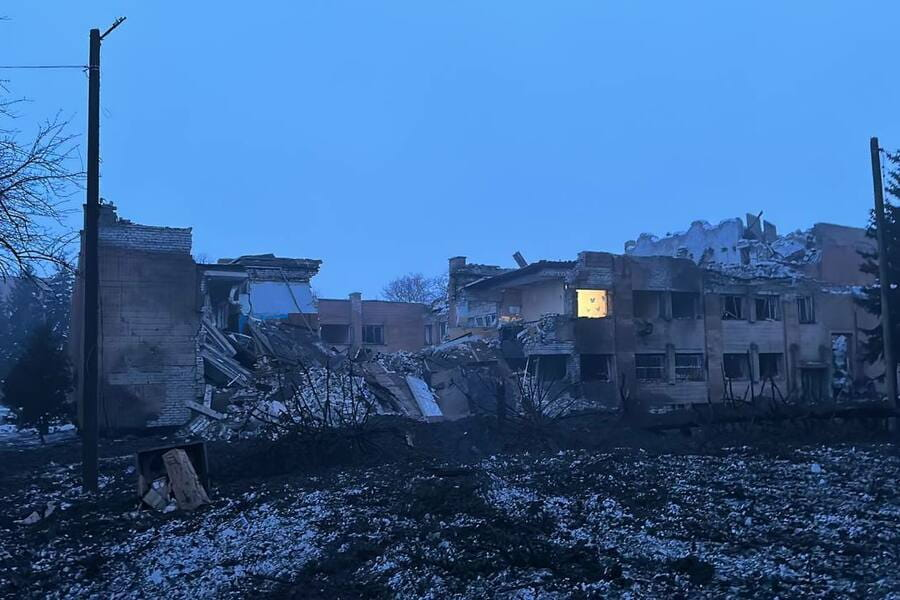
Borova house of culture after Russian strikes in 2024.

In March 2022, the settlement was occupied by Russian forces. On 3 October 2022, Russian forces fled allowing Ukrainian authorities to subsequently regain control of the settlement during the Kharkiv counteroffensive.

On 26 January 2024, a new law entered into force in Ukraine which abolished the status of urban-type settlement, so that Borova became a rural settlement. By 16 May 2026, Russian forces, claimed control over the village and gained territory around.

== Economy ==
=== Transportation ===
The distance to Kharkiv by rail is 193 km, and by road – 165 km. The central bus station links villages and cities via the P-78 and P-79 roads. Borova is on the P-79 road which connects Krasnohrad via Izium with Kupiansk and further crosses into Russia. There are local roads as well.

Borova railway station is on the railway connecting Izium and Sloviansk with Kupiansk where it has further access to Kharkiv and to Valuyki and Liski in Russia.

=== Production ===
- Borovskaya District Printing House, a municipal enterprise
- Borovskaya Food Flavoring Factory.
- Borovskaya Foodstuffs Plant, LLC.
- Borovskaya Inter-Farm Feed Mill, LLC.
- Borovskaya Dairy Plant, CJSC.
- Borovskaya Grain Elevator.
- There are several health camps around the village.

== Social sphere ==
- Borovskaya Gymnasium
- School
- Music School
- Pioneer House
- District Community Center
- District Library
- Children's Library
- District Sports Complex
- Palace of Culture

== Demographics ==
As of the Ukrainian census in 2001, Borova had a population of 6,806 inhabitants. The native language composition was as follows:

First languages (2001)
	percent
Ukrainian	90.5%
Russian	9.0%
Armenian	0.2%
Belarusian	0.1%
others	0.2%

== Attractions ==
- Near the village is the Popovye Mogila burial mound.
- The village is home to a mass grave containing the remains of fallen defenders of Borova during the Great Patriotic War of 1941–1945.
- A monument to natives of the district, Heroes of the Soviet Union Yegor Iosifovich Shutko and Vasily Stepanovich Kolesnik, has been erected in Borovaya.

== Notable people ==
- Yegor Iosifovich Shutko (Hero of the Soviet Union)
- Vasily Stepanovich Kolesnik (Hero of the Soviet Union)
- Irina Viktorovna Sokolova (pianist, Honored Worker of Culture of the Russian Federation)
