= Velykyi Burluk =

Rural locality in Kharkiv Oblast, Ukraine

Velykyi Burluk Великий Бурлук
- Rural settlement
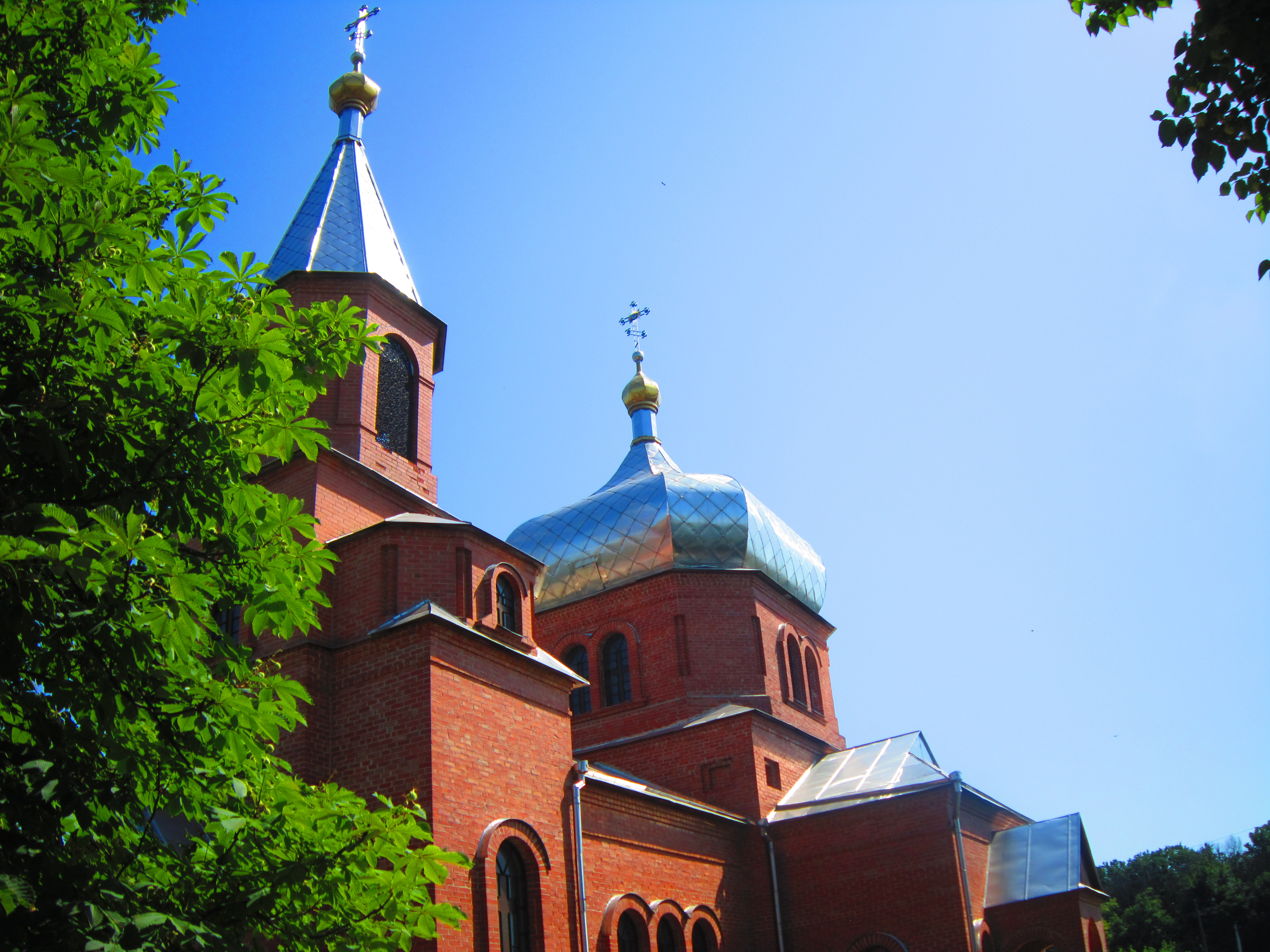
- Church of the Transfiguration.

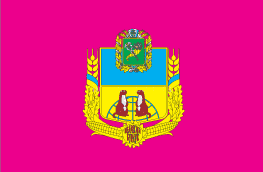
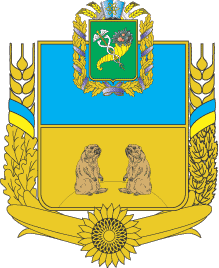
- Flag Coat of arms

- Location within Ukraine Location within Kharkiv Oblast
- Coordinates: 50°02′59″N 37°23′18″E
- Country: Ukraine
- Oblast: Kharkiv Oblast
- Raion: Kupiansk Raion
- Hromada: Velykyi Burluk settlement hromada
- Founded: 1656

Area
  - Total: 2.7 km^{2} (1.0 sq mi)

Population (2022)
  - Total: 3,614
  - Density: 1,300/km^{2} (3,500/sq mi)
- Demonym: Velikoburlutsk (Ukrainian: Великобурлуцька)
- Time zone: UTC+2 (EET)
  - Summer (DST): UTC+3 (EEST)
- ZIP Code: 62606
- Area code: +380 5752
- Website: vlb-gromada.gov.ua

Velykyi Burluk (Ukrainian: Великий Бурлук, lit. 'Great Swamp', Russian: Большой Бурлу́к) is a rural settlement in Ukraine, in Kupiansk Raion of Kharkiv Oblast. It hosts the administration of Velykyi Burluk settlement hromada, one of the hromadas of Ukraine. The population of the settlement is 3,614 (2022 estimate). The settlement was controlled by the Russian military between 24 February 2022 and 10 September 2022.

== Geography ==
Velykyi Burluk is located 108 km from Kharkiv on the left bank of the Velykyi Burluk river Upstream are the villages of Zamost and Buryakovka, downstream are the villages of Ploskoye and Balka, and on the opposite bank is the village of Goryanoye. The village is adjacent to the Nerub tract (oak) forest area.

== Etymology ==
Burluk means "big mud", "swamp" or "buruluk" in the Tatar language. The name likely originated in the 16th-18th century from the local Polovtsians or during raids by the Crimean Tatars.

== History ==
=== Pre-revolutionary years ===
The village was first mentioned in written sources in 1675 under the name of Shevelivka as a fortified point on the border of the Russian state, built to protect against raids of the Crimean Tatars. Around 1680, the lands around the settlement were transferred to the estate of Colonel Konstantin Grigorievich Donets-Zakharzhevsky of the Kharkiv Sloboda Cossack Regiment and confirmed for his sons by a royal charter in 1693 as a reward: "for the many services of their grandfather, Colonel Grigory Donets, and for the service and death of their father, Konstantin Donets," who was killed in battle with the Azov Tatars.

In 1698, the village was destroyed by the Crimean Tatars, but in 1699–1700 it was rebuilt and incorporated into the Izyum Slobodskoy Regiment, no longer the Kharkov Regiment. In 1732, the Burluk "owner's settlement" contained 159 households and 755 male souls. It was a village in Volchansk uyezd of the Sloboda Ukraine.

In 1839, a church dedicated to the Transfiguration of the Lord was consecrated in Burluk. It was built by landowner Andrei Yakovlevich Dontsy-Zakharzhevsky in the St. Petersburg Empire style, designed by Vasily P. Stasov. Two years later, after Andrei Yakovlevich's death, the estate passed to his son-in-law Voin Dmitrievich Zadonsky, who was married to the deceased's daughter. In 1864, an elementary school was opened in the village.

In 1891, the village of Velykyi Burluk was the administrative center of the Velykyi Burluk volost Volchansky Uyezd, Kharkov Governorate, Russian Empire; it had 3,600 residents and 572 households, a school, a hospital, three inns, three shops, and an Orthodox church, and regular fairs were held there.

At the very beginning of the 20th century, a railway line from Belgorod to Kupyansk was built through Velykyi Burluk, which contributed to the village's development. The peasants of Velykyi Burluk took part in the First Russian Revolution. In November 1905, they staged the Burlutsk Uprising; they sacked several landowners' estates; on November 27, they seized and divided 100,000 poods of grain among themselves. The uprising was brutally suppressed.

=== Soviet period ===
On 8 January 1918, Soviet power was established in Bolshoy Burluk, but in April 1918, the village was occupied by advancing Austro-German troops. Later, during the Russian Civil War, power changed hands several times. In December 1918, bandits led by the anarchist Sakharov attacked the Zadonsky estate in Velikiy Burluk and killed the entire Zadonsky family, Prince Vadbolsky, his wife, and daughter. Ekaterina Vasilyevna Zadonskaya (Neklyudova) also died at the age of 84.

According to the account of Yuri Petrovich Mirolyubov, here, on the Zadonsky estate, in the summer of 1919, Colonel Volunteer Army of the Armed Forces of South Russia Ali Izenbek allegedly found wooden tablets covered with incomprehensible writing (the "Veles Book", which modern historical scholarship considers a forgery by Mirolyubov). In December 1919, Soviet power was restored; in 1922 the agricultural artel "Trud" and the commune named after G. I. Petrovsky were established. In the spring of 1923, a small Burlutsky District was created from parts of the Burlutsky and Shipovatsky Volosts of the Volchansky Uyezd of the Kharkov Governorate of the Ukrainian SSR. It was later renamed the Velikoburluksky District; it was part of the Kupyansky Okrug; while part of the Burlutsky Volost was transferred to the Shipovatsky District.

In 1926, a machine and tractor station was organized here; by 1941, it had 95 tractors and 26 combines. A local newspaper has been published here since August 1931. In 1936, a power plant was built. Before the Great Patriotic War, in Velykyi Burluk, located on both banks of the Bolshoy Burluk River, there were 1,270 households, a machine and tractor station, a forestry area, a flour mill, a post office, a district council, and a windmill.

During World War II, it was under German occupation from June 1942 to February 1943. During the Great Patriotic War, after the Barvenkovo Pocket on June 14, 1942, the village was occupied by advancing German troops. However, it was liberated by units of the 303rd Rifle Division (2nd Formation) of the Red Army on February 3-4, 1943. Subsequently, in accordance with the Fourth Five-Year Plan for the Restoration and Development of the National Economy of the USSR, the village was restored. A working youth school was opened in 1950. On October 7, 1963, the village was granted the status of urban-type settlement.

In 1966, the population was 9,500; there were 13 schools with 1,548 students, a Culture Center, two central libraries, and a civilian airport. In 1977, a state nature reserve was established in the area of the village. In 1978, the butter factory, a district agricultural machinery plant, a consumer services plant, four comprehensive schools, a music school, a hospital, a cinema and four libraries were operating here. In January 1989, the population was 5,224 people.

=== Russo-Ukrainian War ===
Until 18 July 2020, Velykyi Burluk was the administrative center of Velykyi Burluk Raion. The raion was abolished in July 2020 as part of the administrative reform of Ukraine, which reduced the number of raions of Kharkiv Oblast to seven. The area of Velykyi Burluk Raion was merged into Kupiansk Raion.

The town was occupied by the Russian military on 24 February 2022, the first day of the Russian invasion of Ukraine. According to local residents, bombardment of the area began at 05:00, and the first Russian tanks entered the town around 08:00. There was no attempt to defend the town, and there were no Ukrainian forces in the area at the time of the invasion. In July 2022, the pro-Russian leader of the area was reportedly killed by a car bomb by Ukrainian partisans. On 11 September 2022, the town was retaken by Ukrainian forces during the autumn counteroffensive.

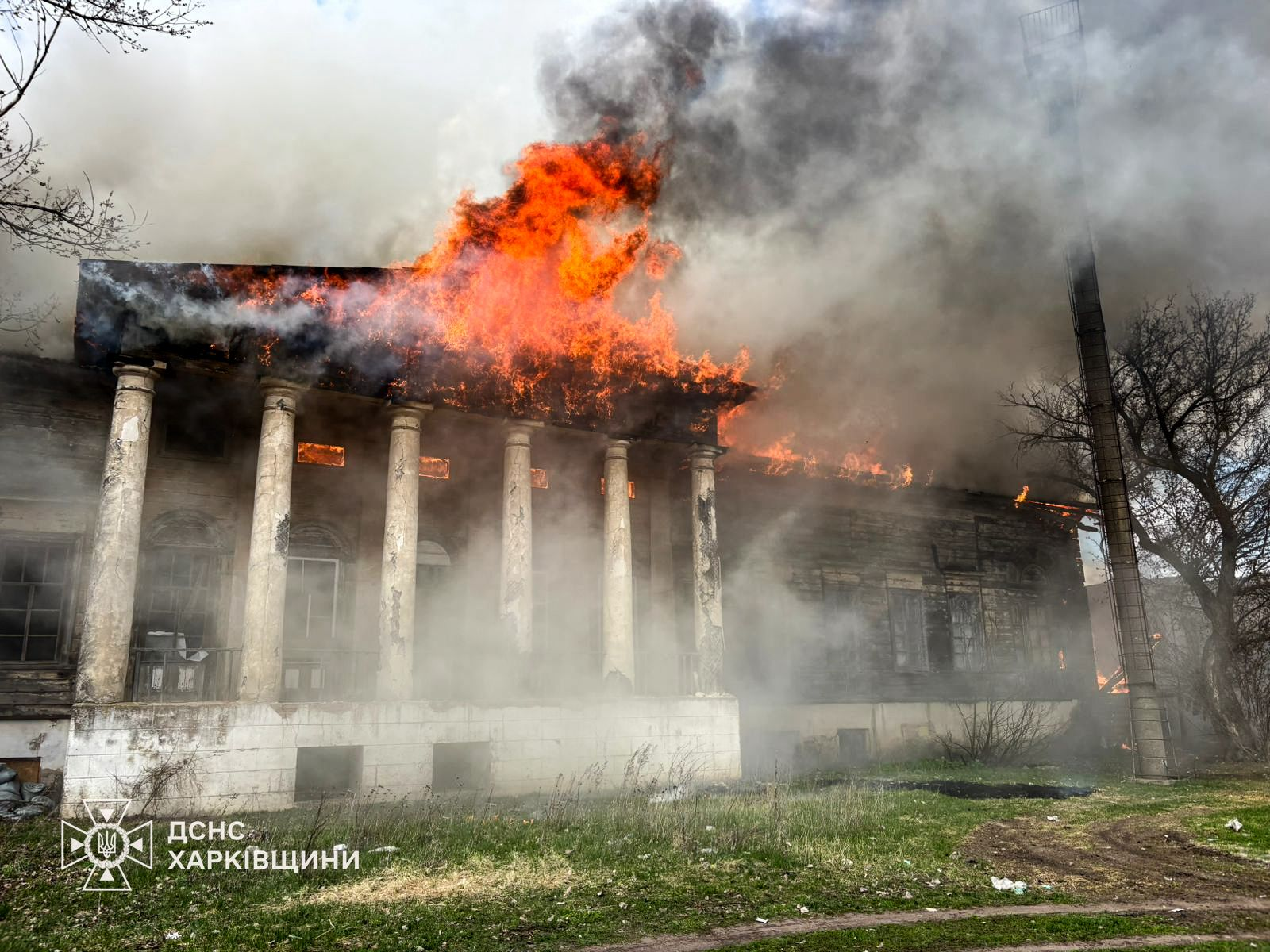
Manor in Velykyi Burluk (1835) after drone attack in 2026.

Later Velykyi Burluk was attacked by Russian forces many times. In particular, on 31 January 2024, guided air-dropped bombs hit local hospital. Until 26 January 2024, Velykyi Burluk was designated urban-type settlement. On this day, a new law entered into force which abolished this status, and Velykyi Burluk became a rural settlement.

On 7 April 2026, a drone strike destroyed a local architectural monument, the manor of the Donets-Zakharzhevsky family (1835). An administrative building in the town was damaged on 23 September 2026.

== Economy ==
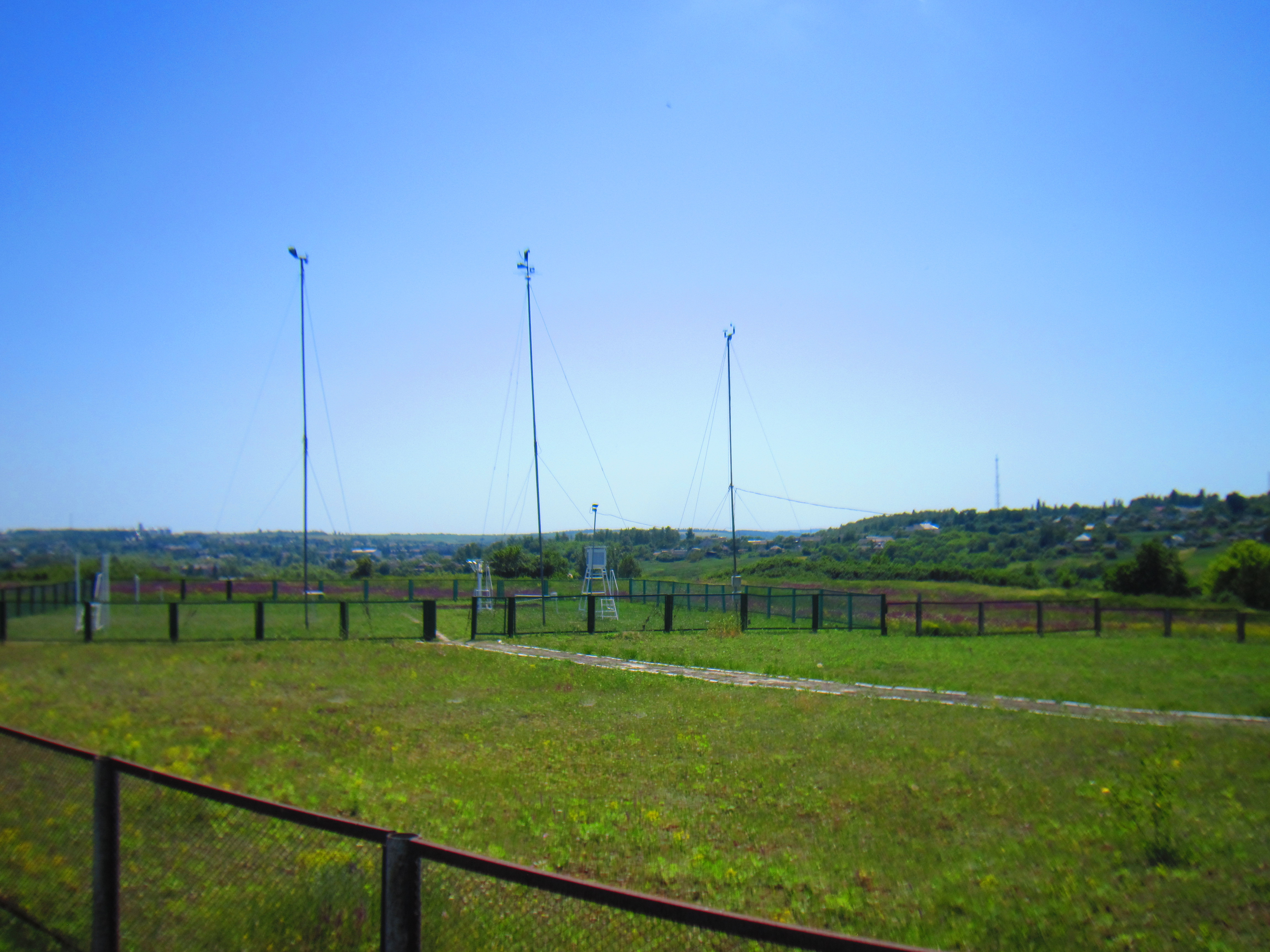
Weather station in the village.

=== Industry ===
- Velikoburluk Cheese Factory OJSC;
- Several machine and tractor workshops;
- Velikoburluk Bakery of the Velikoburluk District Consumer Union;
- Velikoburluk District Printing House.

=== Transportation ===
The village has two train stations: Burluk (on the Belgorod-Kupyansk line) and Poselochnaya. The distance to Kharkiv by train is 189 km.

== Social sphere ==
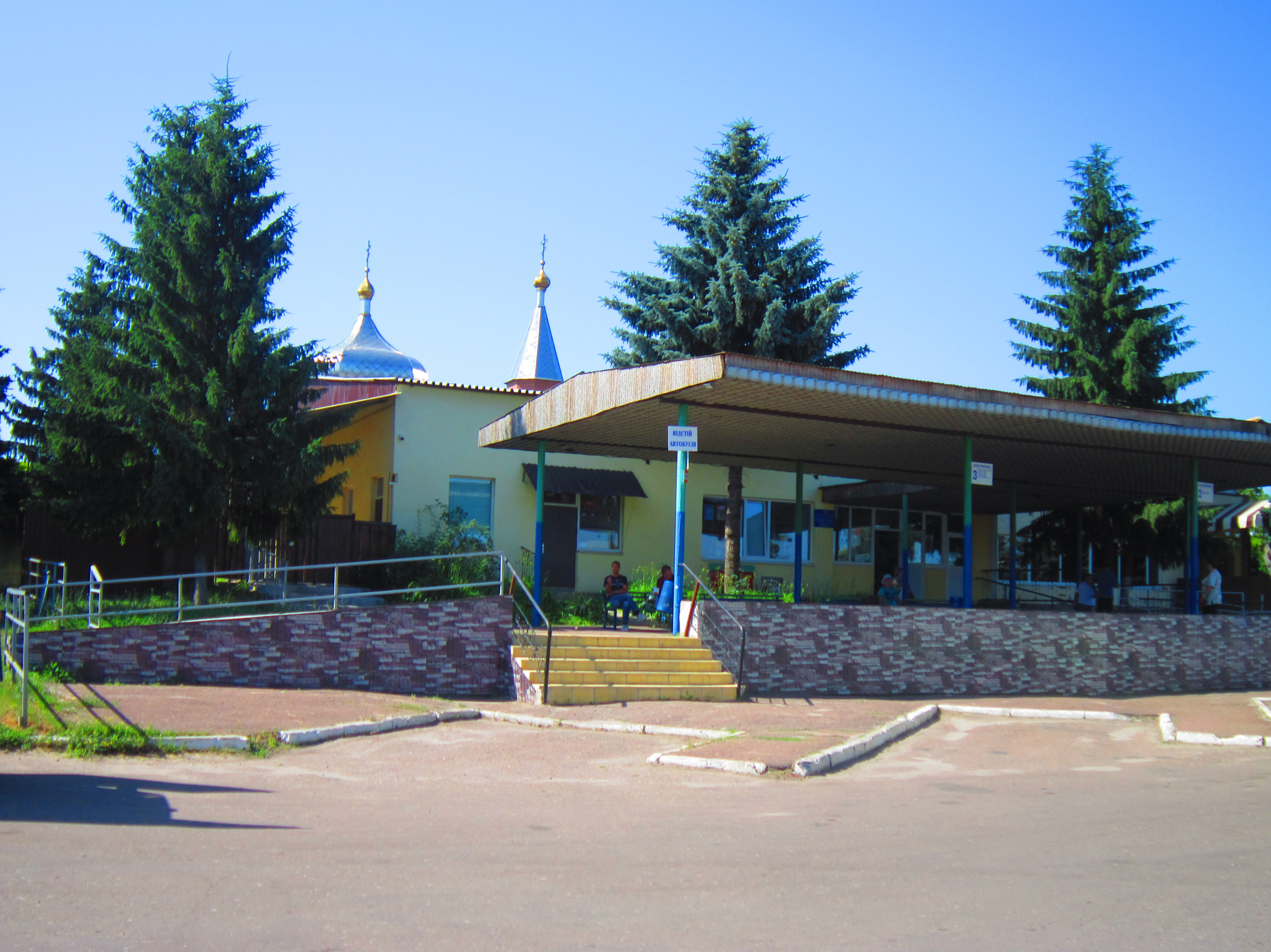
Central Bus station.

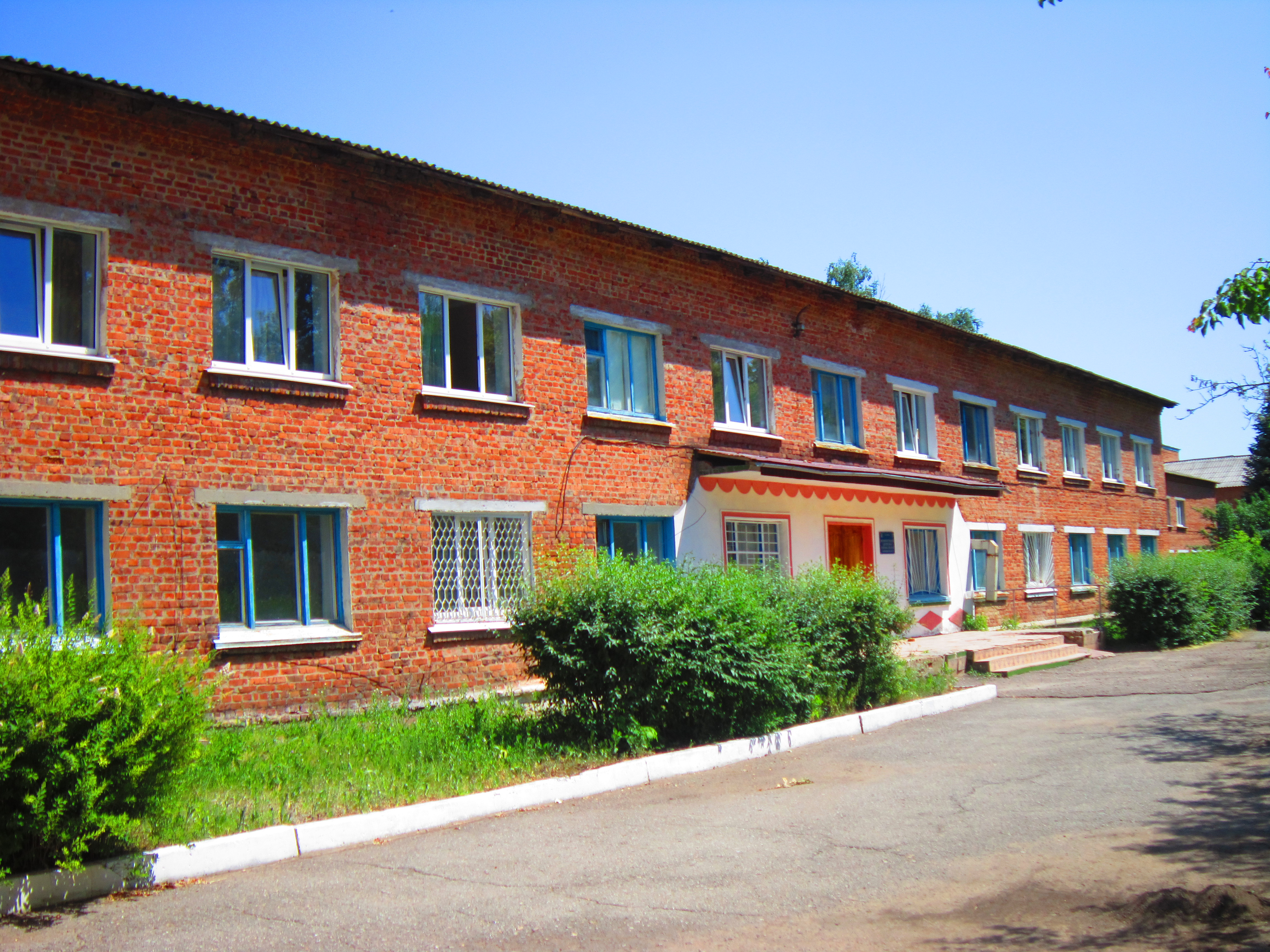
Central Raion hospital.

- Velikoburluk Lyceum;
- Velikoburluk Children's and Youth Sports School;
- Velikoburluk Children's Music School;
- Community Center;
- Museum;
- Hospital;
- Velikoburluk Veterinary Clinic;
- Velikoburluk IRC.

== Climate ==
Climate data for Velykyi Burluk (1981–2010)
Month	Jan	Feb	Mar	Apr	May	Jun	Jul	Aug	Sep	Oct	Nov	Dec	Year
Mean daily maximum °C (°F)	−3.0 (26.6)	−2.5 (27.5)	3.5 (38.3)	13.9 (57.0)	20.9 (69.6)	24.4 (75.9)	26.5 (79.7)	25.9 (78.6)	19.6 (67.3)	11.8 (53.2)	3.1 (37.6)	−2.3 (27.9)	11.8 (53.2)
Daily mean °C (°F)	−5.5 (22.1)	−5.6 (21.9)	−0.2 (31.6)	8.5 (47.3)	15.0 (59.0)	18.5 (65.3)	20.5 (68.9)	19.5 (67.1)	13.8 (56.8)	7.2 (45.0)	0.2 (32.4)	−4.4 (24.1)	7.3 (45.1)
Mean daily minimum °C (°F)	−8.2 (17.2)	−8.8 (16.2)	−3.6 (25.5)	3.5 (38.3)	9.1 (48.4)	13.1 (55.6)	15.1 (59.2)	13.6 (56.5)	8.8 (47.8)	3.4 (38.1)	−2.3 (27.9)	−7.1 (19.2)	3.1 (37.6)
Average precipitation mm (inches)	44.1 (1.74)	38.1 (1.50)	34.9 (1.37)	36.6 (1.44)	51.8 (2.04)	70.3 (2.77)	59.1 (2.33)	46.2 (1.82)	48.1 (1.89)	46.8 (1.84)	45.3 (1.78)	44.5 (1.75)	565.8 (22.28)
Average precipitation days (≥ 1.0 mm)	9.9	9.0	8.1	7.0	6.8	9.1	7.7	5.3	6.8	6.8	7.9	9.5	93.9
Average relative humidity (%)	86.6	84.3	79.7	67.4	62.8	69.0	69.7	66.9	72.4	79.6	86.6	87.2	76.0
Source: World Meteorological Organization

== Demographics ==
As of the 2001 Ukrainian census, Velykyi Burluk had a population of 4,937 inhabitants. In January 2013 the population was 4,053 people. In 2001, the linguistic composition of the population was:

Native languages in Velykyi Burluk
	percent
Ukrainian	87.9%
Russian	11.6%
Belarusian	0.3%
Armenian	0.1%
others	0.2%

== Attractions ==
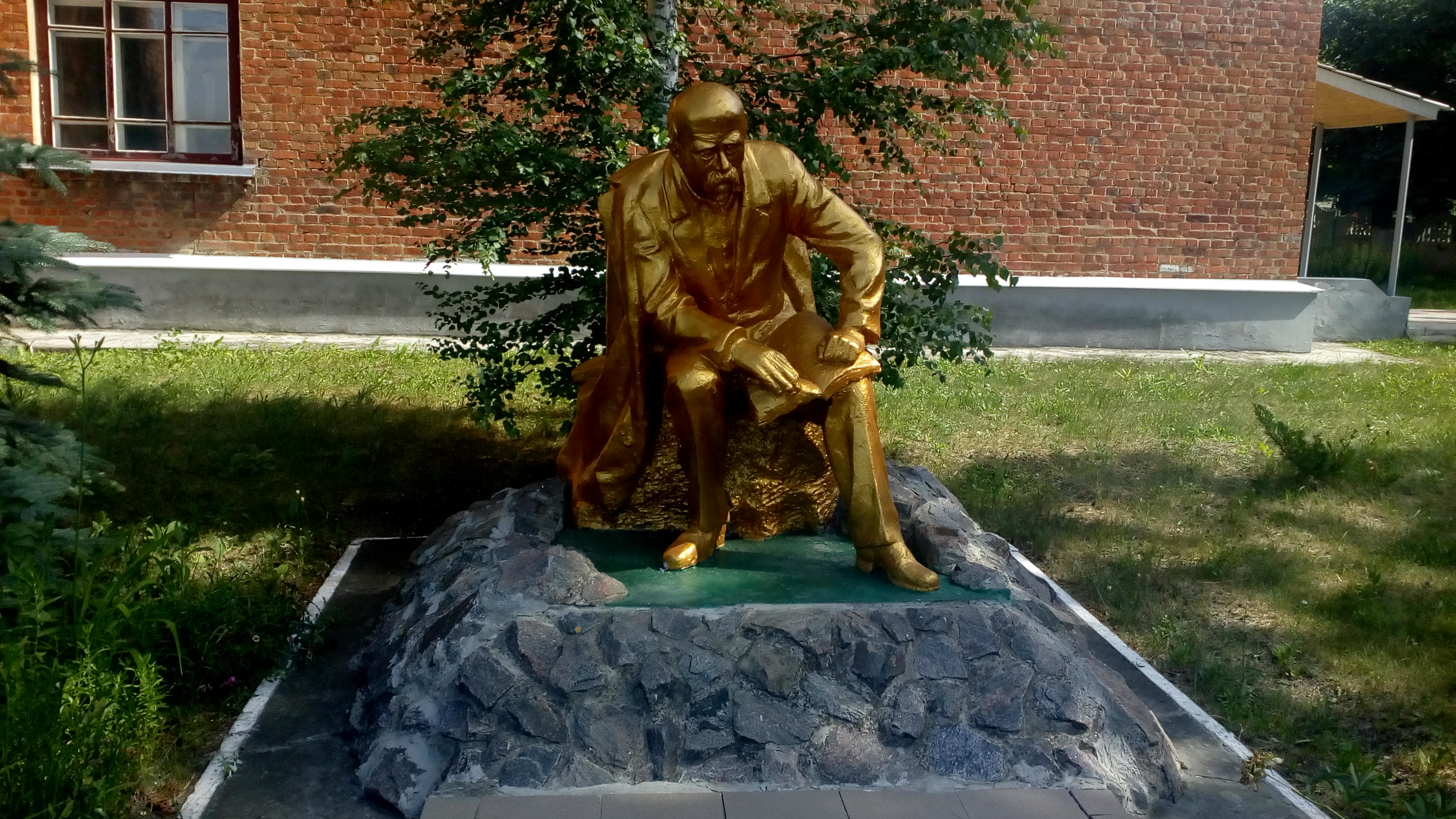
Statue of Taras Shevchenko.

- Orthodox church built in the 1830s (architectural monument).
- Regional landscape park "Velikoburlukskaya Steppe". Area: 2,042.6 hectares. Located on the territory of the town Velikiy Burluk and the villages Katerinovka, Chervonaya Khvyly, Andreevka, Goryanoye, Shipovatoe and Ploskoye.
- The wooden manor house of Zadonsky (an architectural monument from 1835), which for a long time housed a communal apartment; in a deplorable state.
The Zadonsky estate in pre-revolutionary photographs

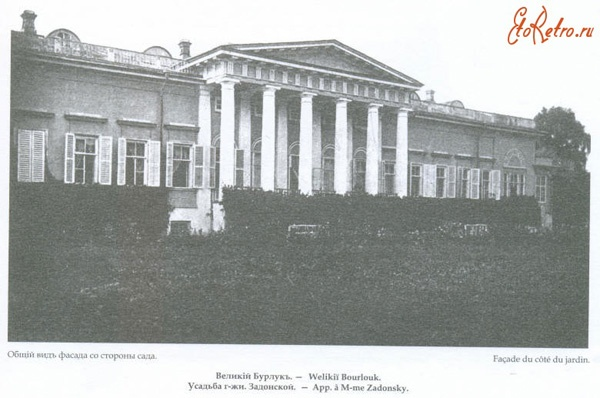

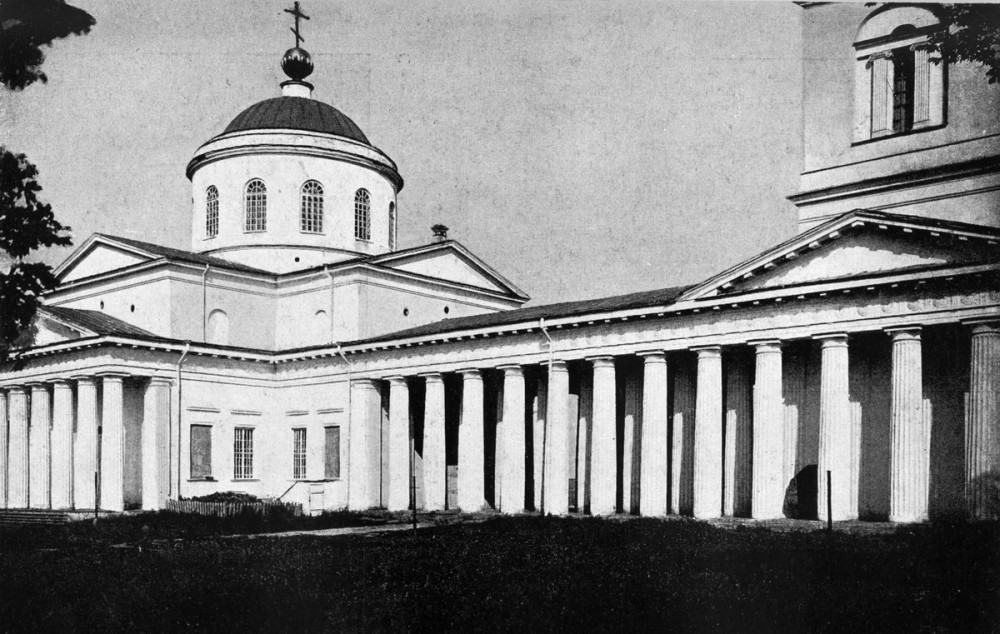

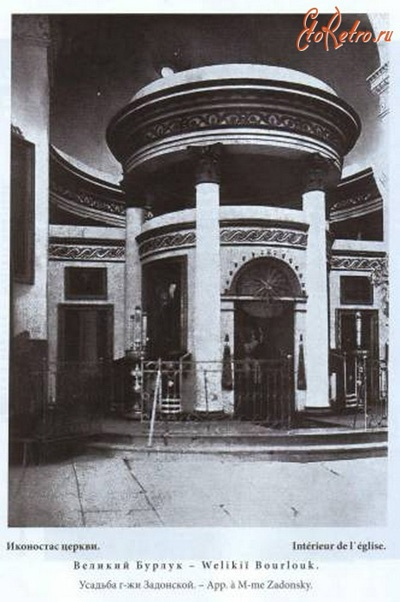

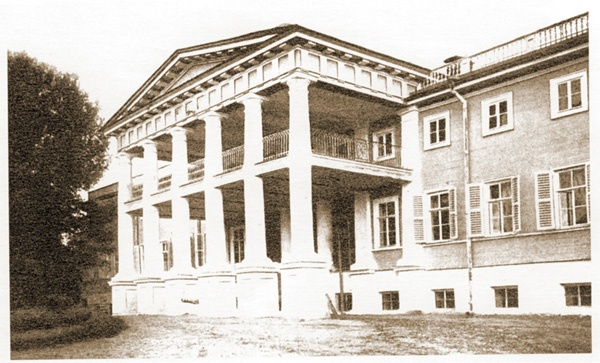

== Notable people ==
- Aleksandr Voinovich Zadonsky (1834–1912), born in the village of Velikiy Burluk, lieutenant general of the Russian Imperial Army.
- Ivan Afanasyevich Kaliberda (1920–2020), born in the village of Velikiy Burluk, Hero of the Soviet Union.
- Leonid Alekseevich Protsenko (1911–1943), born in the village of Velykyi Burluk, Hero of the Soviet Union, Red Army soldier.
- Fyodor Vasilyevich Chaika (1918–1974), graduated from eighth grade in the regional center of Velykyi Burluk, Hero of the Soviet Union.
