= Dmitry Loza =

Soviet military officer

Dmitry Federovich Loza
- Native name: Дмитрий Фёдорович Лоза
- Born: 14 April 1922; Kolesnikovka village, Kupyansky Uyezd, Kharkov Governorate, RSFSR
- Died: 22 May 2001 (aged 79) Moscow, Russia
- Buried: Troyekurovskoye Cemetery
- Allegiance: Soviet Union
- Branch: Red Army
- Service years: 1940-1967
- Rank: Colonel
- Conflicts: World War II; Vienna Offensive; Manchurian Operation
- Awards: Hero of the Soviet Union
- Other work: Associate Professor

Dmitry Fedorovich Loza (Russian: Дмитрий Фёдорович Лоза; 14 April 1922 – 22 May 2001) was a Ukrainian Red Army Colonel and Hero of the Soviet Union. He served as an Armor officer during World War II, fighting in the Vienna Offensive and in the Manchurian Strategic Offensive Operation. Loza was awarded the title Hero of the Soviet Union for his leadership of a tank battalion in the Vienna Offensive. Postwar, he was a senior lecturer at the Frunze Military Academy before retiring from the Soviet Army in 1967.

== Early life ==
Dmitry Loza was born on 14 April 1922 in the village of Kolesnikovka in Kupyansky Uyezd of the Kharkov Governorate to a peasant family. He completed secondary school. In 1940, he was drafted into the Red Army.

== World War II ==
Loza graduated from the Saratov Tank School in 1942. From 1 June 1943, he fought on the Western Front as commander of the 2nd Tank Company of the 1st Tank Battalion of the 233rd Tank Brigade of the 5th Mechanized Corps. Loza distinguished himself in the battle for the village of Latyshi, Smolensk Oblast, on 14 August, leading the company into the attack three times. His tank crew was credited with destroying three anti-tank guns and one tank, in addition to running over a machine gun and its crew. Wounded when his tank was damaged by a Tiger tank, Loza was evacuated to a hospital. He was awarded the Order of the Patriotic War 2nd class on 13 September for this action. After leaving the hospital in November, he was appointed chief of armaments of the 233rd Tank Brigade's 1st Battalion. In late January 1944, he fought in the Korsun-Shevchenkovsky Offensive. Loza received the Order of the Red Star on 22 April 1944. He was awarded the Order of Alexander Nevsky on 23 February 1945. By 1945, he was a captain commanding the 1st Tank Battalion of the 46th Guards Tank Brigade, equipped with the M4 Sherman. His tank battalion was reported to have captured trains loaded with ammunition, two warehouses and an artillery workshop with 14 guns, as well as 4 Panther tanks on railway platforms on 23 March on the way to Veszprém. On the same day, the battalion fought an action against a German tank column, reportedly knocking out 29 tanks and self-propelled guns, capturing 20 and destroying 10 vehicles. It also reportedly killed 250 German soldiers. After advancing 100 kilometers, the battalion broke through to Vienna on 9 April, holding there for a day before the arrival of the rest of the brigade. After the end of the war against Germany, the brigade was transferred to the Transbaikal Front. In August 1945, Loza fought in the Soviet invasion of Manchuria. On 30 September 1945, he received the Order of the Red Banner. He was awarded the title Hero of the Soviet Union and the Order of Lenin on 15 May 1946 for his actions during the Vienna Offensive.

== Postwar ==
In 1950, Loza graduated from the Frunze Military Academy. He graduated from its postgraduate academy in 1956 and became a senior lecturer there. On 30 September 1956, Loza was awarded his second Order of the Red Star. After his retirement in 1967, he worked as a senior fellow at the Research Institute and was an associate professor, as well as a Candidate of Military Sciences. Loza was awarded the Order of the Patriotic War, 1st class in 1985 because he was a surviving veteran. He died on 22 May 2001 and is buried in Troyekurovskoye Cemetery.
