= Merefa =

City in Kharkiv Oblast, Ukraine

Merefa Мерефа
- City
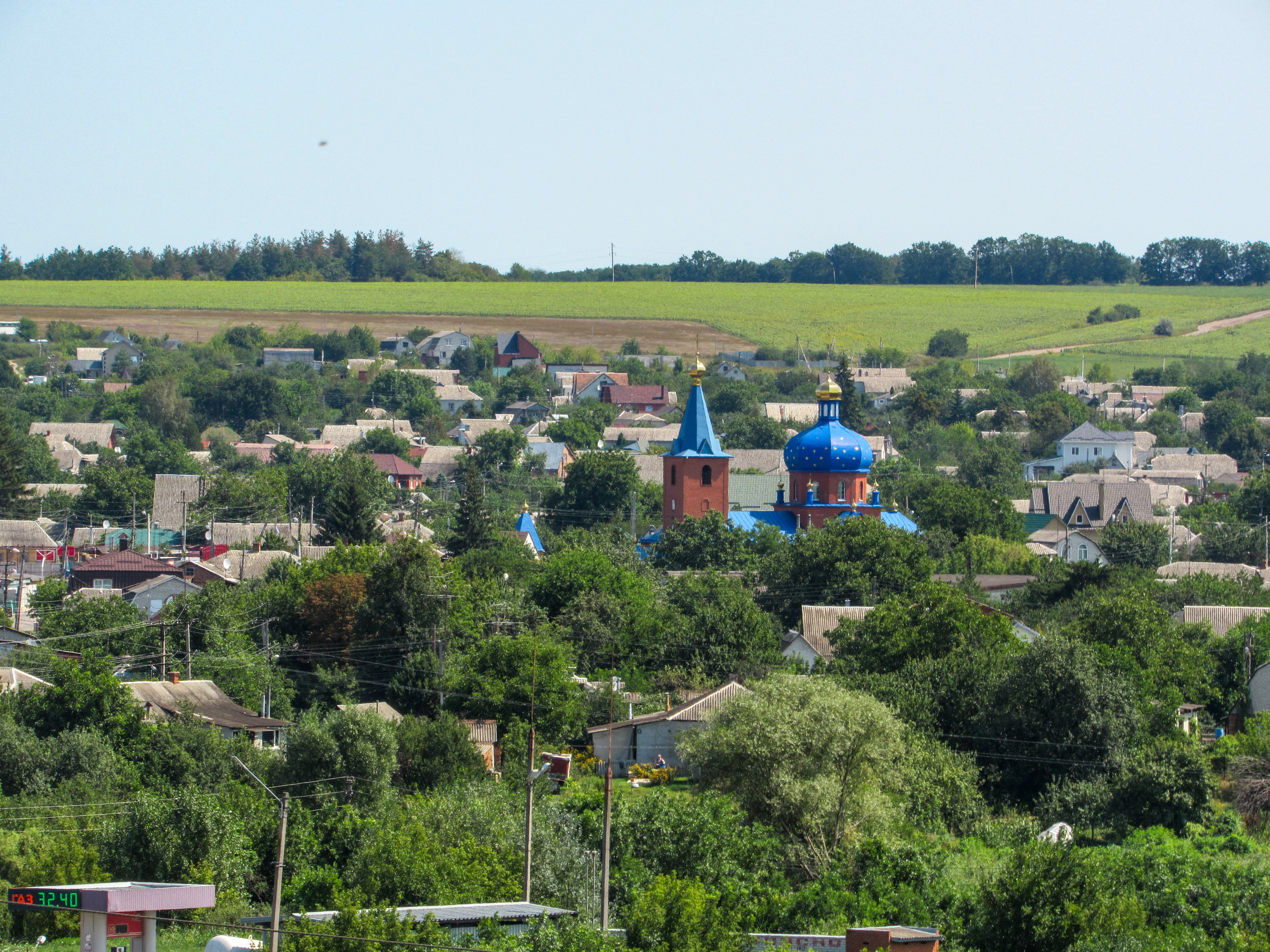

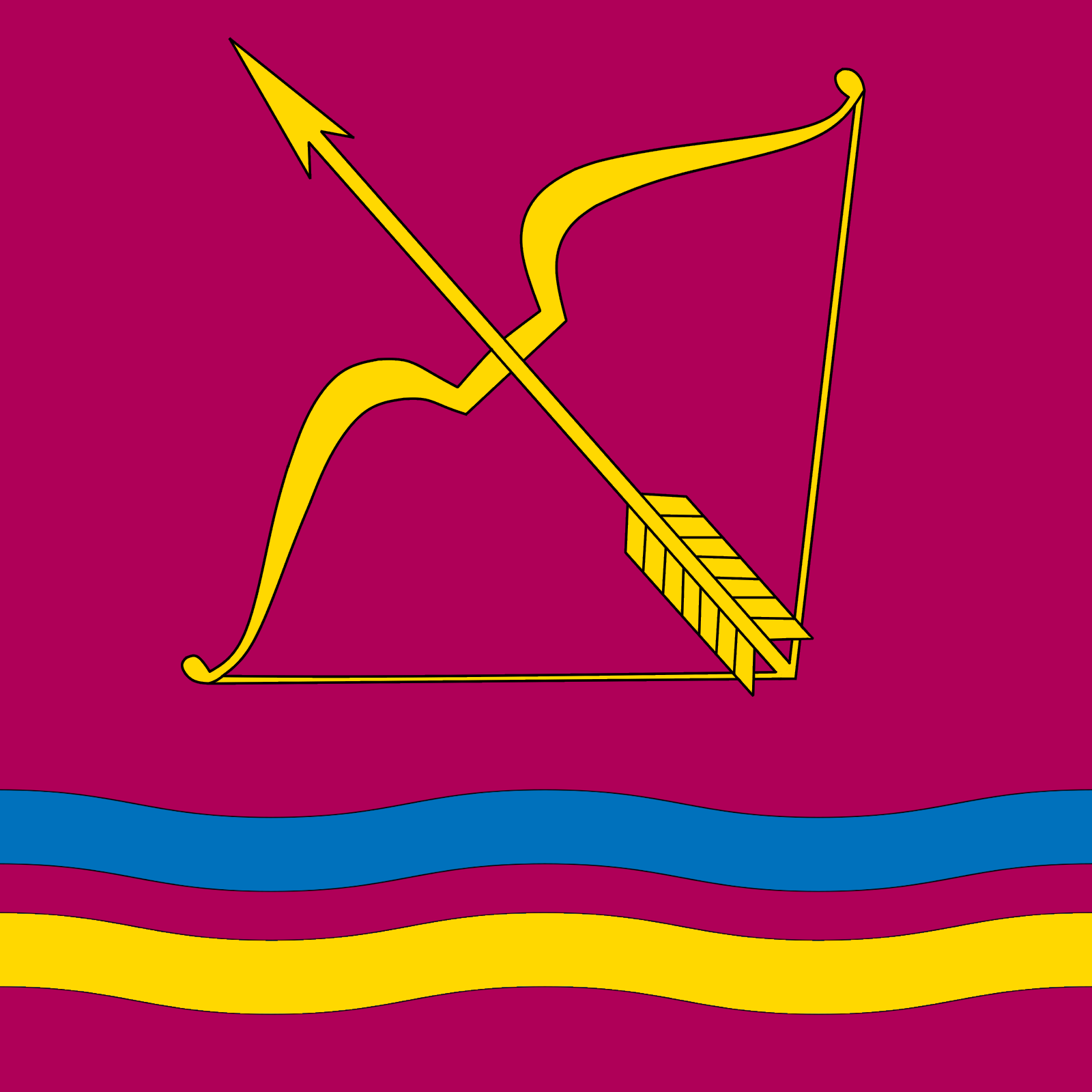
- Flag Coat of arms
- Interactive map of Merefa
- Location within Kharkiv Oblast Location within Ukraine
- Coordinates: 49°49′N 36°03′E
- Country: Ukraine
- Oblast: Kharkiv Oblast
- Raion: Kharkiv Raion
- Hromada: Merefa urban hromada

Population (2022)
  - Total: 21,202
- Time zone: UTC+2 (EET)
  - Summer (DST): UTC+3 (EEST)

Merefa (Ukrainian: Мeрeфa, IPA: [meˈrɛfɐ]) is a city in Kharkiv Raion, Kharkiv Oblast, in eastern Ukraine. Merefa hosts the administration of Merefa urban hromada, one of the hromadas of Ukraine. Population: 21,202 (2022 estimate).

== Name ==
Etymologists have not reached a final conclusion, but it is believed that the name originated from the Old Slavic "mьrRs" (to fade), which is derived from the Ukrainian merekhtyty (to flicker; barely visible). Another version is a hydronymic from "merecha" (Ukrainian for forest thicket; dense shrubbery in a swampy lowland), which is based on the Proto-Slavic "merRja" (Ukrainian for swampy place). Among the analogies is also merechytysia (to be seen), which is related to the root mereka ("delusion, ghost") derived from the Proto-Slavic morkъ (морок).

== History ==
It was a village in Kharkovsky Uyezd of Kharkov Governorate of the Russian Empire.

During the Ukrainian War of Independence, from 1917 to 1920, it passed between various factions. Afterwards it was administratively part of the Kharkiv Governorate of Ukraine.

City since 1938.

In January 1989 the population was 28,952 people. In 1992-1996, the Avangard football club of Merefa played in the national championship of Ukraine (third and second league in 1996/97) as a team that won the Kharkiv Oblast Football Championship (4 times in a row) and won prizes in transitional tournaments.

In January 2013 the population was 22,280 people.

On March 17, 2022, at about 3:30 am, Russian servicemen shelled the town of Merefa, Kharkiv district, destroying a secondary school and a house of culture. 15 people were killed. 25 people were injured, 10 of them in serious condition.

== Demographics ==
Distribution of the population by ethnicity according to the 2001 census:

Ethnic groups in Merefa
	percent
Ukrainians	85.20%
Russians	12.65%
Gypsies	0.62%
Belarusians	0.25%
Armenians	0.20%
Georgians	0.14%
Tatars	0.10%
Azerbaijanis	0.06%

== Transport ==
- a railway station

== Gallery ==
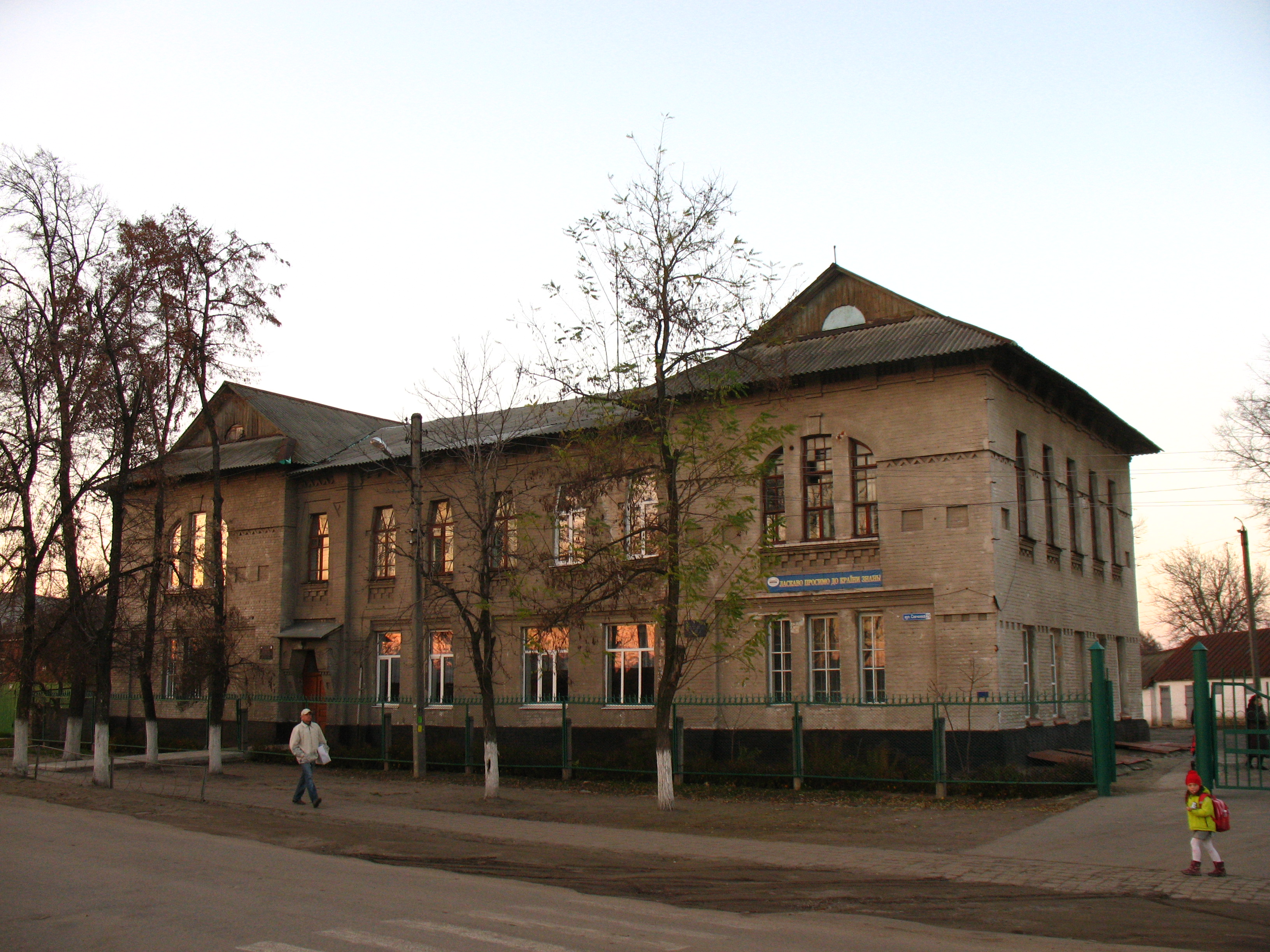
A school in Merefa

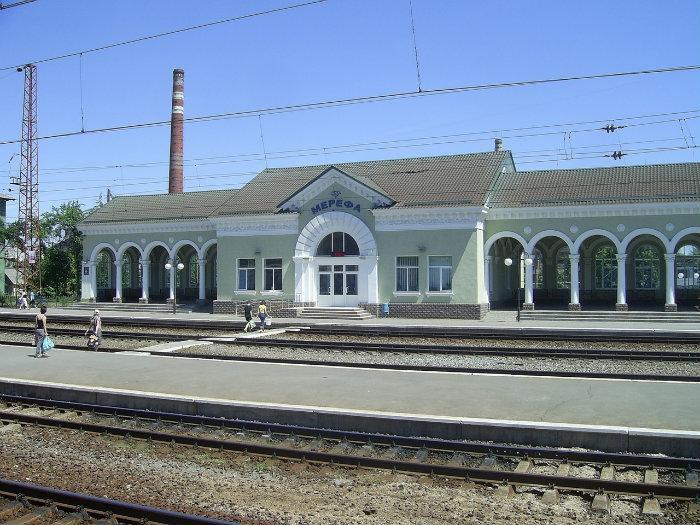
Railway station

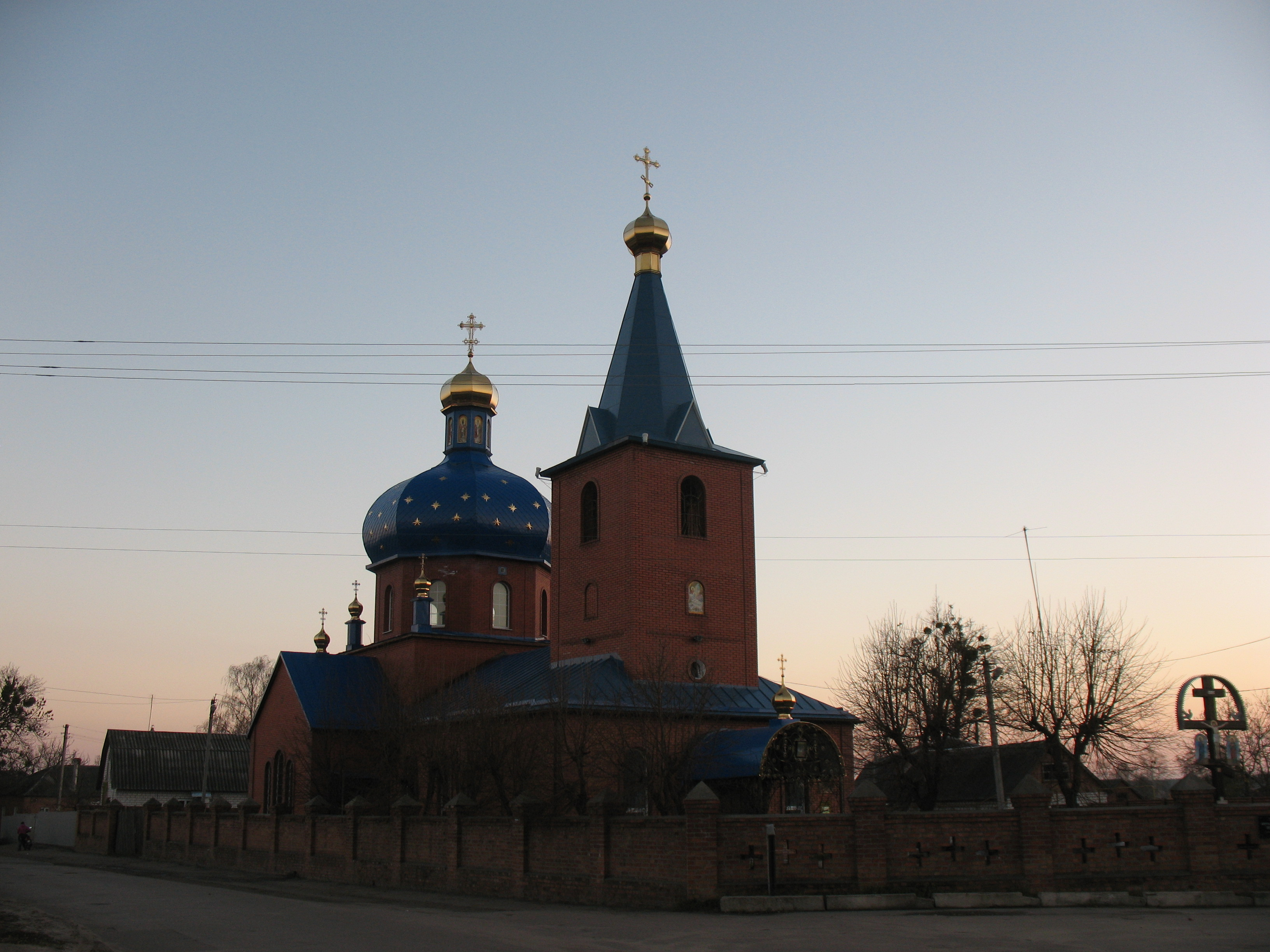
Church of the Nativity of the Theotokos

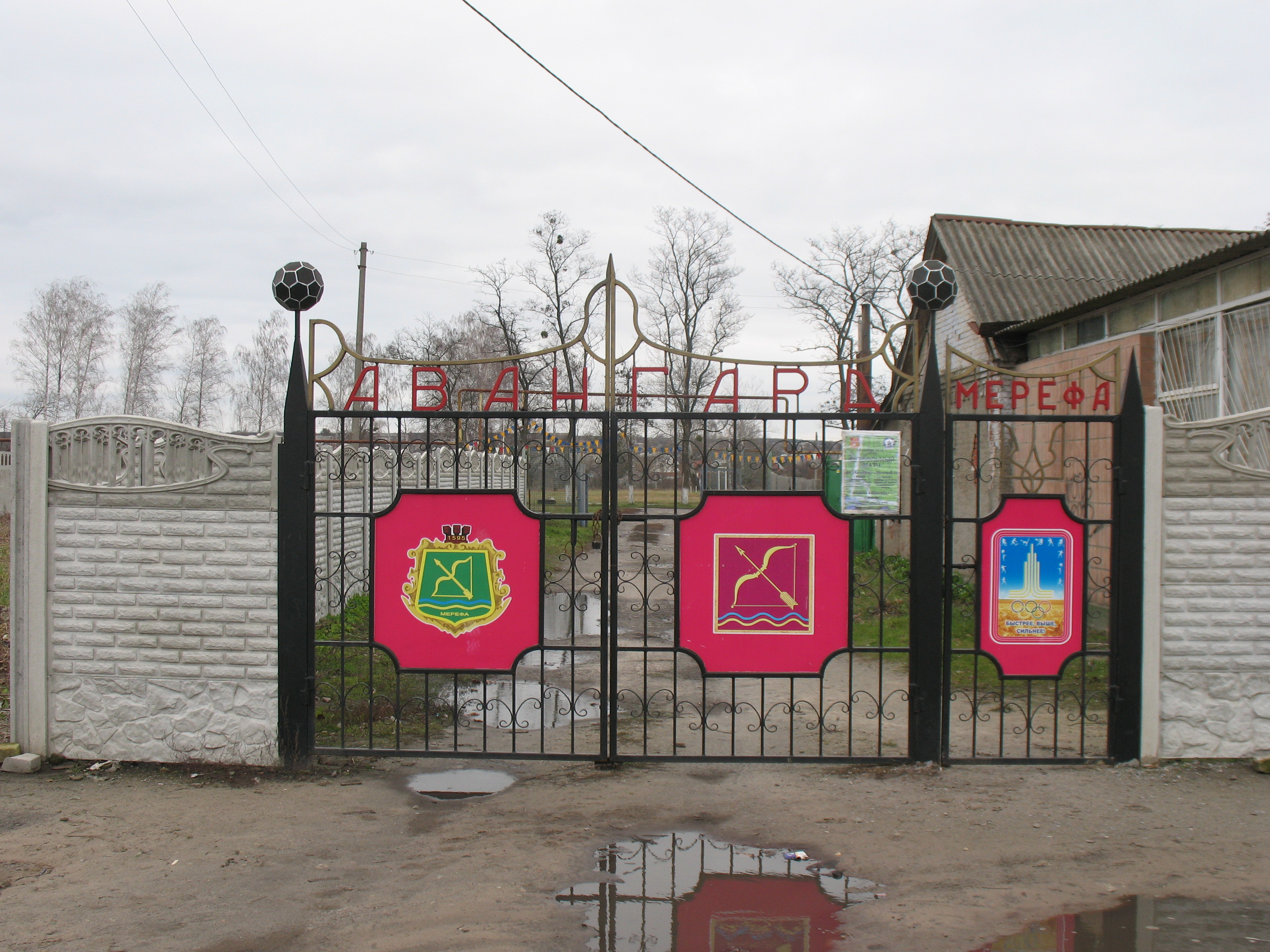
Entrance to Avanhard Stadium
