= Valkovsky Uyezd =

- Former subdivision of the Russian Empire
- 1797–1923
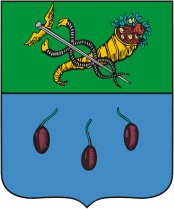
- Coat of arms

- Capital: Valky
- Population
  - (1897): 144 322
- History
  - Established: 1797
  - Disestablished: 1923

Valkovsky Uyezd (Russian: Валковский уезд; Ukrainian: Валківський повіт, romanized: Valkivskyi povit) was one of the subdivisions of the Kharkov Governorate of the Russian Empire. It was situated in the western part of the governorate. Its administrative centre was Valky.

== Demographics ==
At the time of the Russian Empire Census of 1897, Valkovsky Uyezd had a population of 144,322. Of these, 97.1% spoke Ukrainian, 2.6% Russian and 0.1% Polish as their native language.

On April 30 (or May 1), 1921, rebel units stormed the town of Valky. After capturing the southern outskirts, the exhausted Haidamak forces retreated, and the Reds gathered fresh forces. The occupiers were led by Robert Eideman. The Ukrainian rebels were defeated near the village of Koviagy, and one of the Haidamak leaders, Sorokin, was captured. However, the Valky Cossacks continued to resist - the remnants of the units were led by Ataman Biletskyi, who fought the Red enemy near the village of Snizhkiv. The ataman fought against the red enemy until 1922. Then the Ukrainian resistance was broken.

On March 7, 1923, according to the new territorial delimitation, the territory of the district became part of the Bohodukhiv district.
