= Lebedinsky Uyezd =

- Former subdivision of the Russian Empire
- 1797–1923
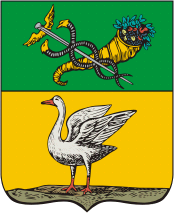
- Coat of arms

- Capital: Lebedyn
- Population
  - (1897): 234 182
- History
  - Established: 1797
  - Disestablished: 1923
Preceded by
Sumy Regiment

Lebedinsky Uyezd (Russian: Лебединский уезд; Ukrainian: Лебединський повіт, romanized: Lebedynskyi povit) was an uyezd (district) in the Kharkov Governorate of the Russian Empire.

== History ==
This uyezd was created on April 25, 1780 by order of the Empress Catherine the Great. The administrative centre of the uyezd was the small town Lebedin. In September 1781 it received its own coat of arms.

The uyezd had two towns (Lebedin and Nedrigailov) and consisted of 27 volosts.

In January 1897, according to the Russian Empire Census, the population of the uyezd was 234,182.

By the Soviet administrative reform of 1923, the uyezd was transformed into the Lebedin raion.

== Demographics ==
At the time of the Russian Empire Census of 1897, Lebedinsky Uyezd had a population of 178,144. Of these, 95.3% spoke Ukrainian, 4.4% Russian, 0.2% Yiddish and 0.1% Polish as their native language.

== Sources ==
- Лебедин, уездный город Харьковской губернии // Энциклопедический словарь Брокгауза и Ефрона : в 86 т. (82 т. и 4 доп.). — Т. 33. СПб., 1896.
