= Kharkovsky Uyezd =

- Former subdivision of the Russian Empire
- 1780–1923
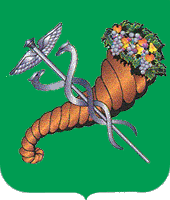
- Coat of arms

- Capital: Kharkov
- Population
  - (1897): 348,488
- History
  - Established: 1780
  - Disestablished: 1923
| Preceded by |
| Kharkiv Regiment |

Kharkovsky Uyezd (Russian: Харьковский уезд; Ukrainian: Харківський повіт, romanized: Kharkivskyi povit) was an uyezd (district) in the Kharkov Governorate of the Russian Empire.

== History ==
This uyezd was created on April 25, 1780 by order of the Empress Catherine the Great. The administrative centre of uyezd was the city of Kharkov.

The uyezd had one city (Kharkov), one small town (Zolochev) and consisted of 27 volosts.

In January 1897, according to the Russian Empire Census, the population of the uyezd was 348,488 people.

By the Soviet administrative reform of 1923, the uyezd was transformed into Kharkiv Raion.

== Demographics ==
At the time of the Russian Empire Census of 1897, Kharkovsky Uyezd had a population of 348,488. Of these, 54.9% spoke Ukrainian, 39.5% Russian, 2.8% Yiddish, 1.2% Polish, 0.7% German, 0.2% Belarusian, 0.2% Tatar, 0.1% Armenian and 0.1% French as their native language.

== Sources ==
- Харьков // Энциклопедический словарь Брокгауза и Ефрона : в 86 т. (82 т. и 4 доп.). — Т. 37. СПб., 1903.
