= Velykyi Burluk Raion =

Former subdivision of Kharkiv Oblast, Ukraine

Velykyi Burluk Raion Великобурлуцький район
- Raion
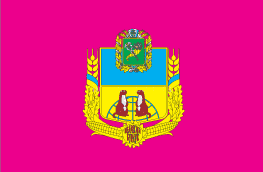
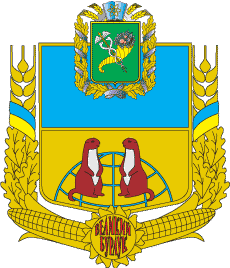
- Flag Coat of arms

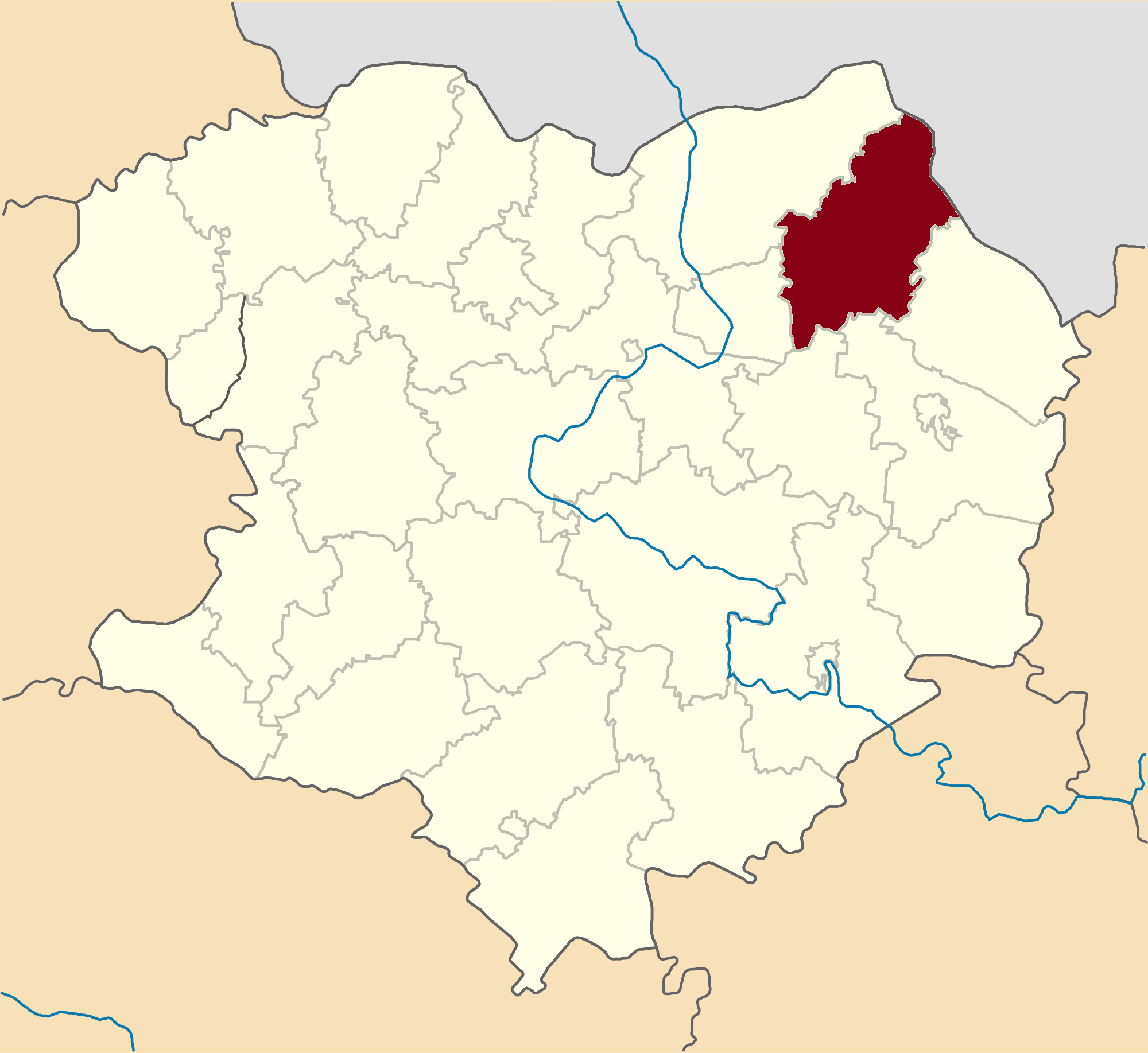
- Raion location in Kharkiv Oblast
- Coordinates: 50°4′33.6972″N 37°25′27.2202″E
- Country: Ukraine
- Oblast: Kharkiv Oblast
- Disestablished: 18 July 2020
- Admin. center: Velykyi Burluk

Area
  - Total: 1,220.8 km^{2} (471.4 sq mi)

Population (2020)
  - Total: 21,256
- Time zone: UTC+2 (EET)
  - Summer (DST): UTC+3 (EEST)
- Website: http://vburlukrda.ucoz.ru/

Velykyi Burluk Raion (Ukrainian: Великобурлуцький район) was a raion (district) in Kharkiv Oblast of Ukraine. Its administrative center was the urban-type settlement of Velykyi Burluk. The raion was abolished on 18 July 2020 as part of the administrative reform of Ukraine, which reduced the number of raions of Kharkiv Oblast to seven. The area of Velykyi Burluk Raion was merged into Kupiansk Raion. The last estimate of the raion population was 21,256 (2020 est.)

At the time of disestablishment, the raion consisted of two hromada:

- Velykyi Burluk settlement hromada with the administration in Velykyi Burluk;
- Vilkhuvatka rural hromada with the administration in the selo of Vilkhuvatka.

== List of villages ==
- Zelenyi Hai
