= Ostrogozhsk Regiment =

Ostrogozhsk Regiment Rybne Regiment
- Regimental flag
- Active: 1652 – 1765
- Type: Cossack Regiment
- Size: 18 sotnias (1732)
- Garrison/HQ: Ostrogozhsk (Rybne)

Commanders
- Notable commanders: Ivan Dzykovsky

Insignia
- Regimental coat of arms

The Ostrogozhsk Sloboda Cossack Regiment (Russian: Острогожский слободской черкасский полк) or the Rybne Regiment (Ukrainian: Рибенський слобідський козацький полк) was one of territorial-administrative subdivisions of the Sloboda Ukraine. The regiment's capital was the city of Ostrogozhsk (Rybne), now in Voronezh Oblast of the Russian Federation.

== Background ==
The regiment was established in 1652 by Ukrainian Cossacks from the Chernihiv regiment and the Nizhyn regiment, led by Colonel Ivan Dzykovsky. In 1732 it consisted of 18 sotnias (companies). The regiment took part in Dzykovsky's revolt of 1670, the Azov campaigns of 1695–1696, the Great Northern War (1700–21), and the Seven Years' War (1756–63). In 1765, the sloboda regiments was abolished, and its territory was incorporated into the Sloboda Ukraine Governorate (later the Kharkov Governorate). With the completion of the provincial reform in 1782 the regimental town was transferred to the neighboring Voronezh Governorate.
