= Zelenyi Hai, Kupiansk Raion, Kharkiv Oblast =

Rural locality in Kharkiv Oblast, Ukraine

Coordinates: 49°58′32″N 37°10′38″E

Zelenyi Hai Зелений Гай
- Village
- Interactive map of Zelenyi Hai
- Country: Ukraine
- Oblast: Kharkiv Oblast
- Raion: Kupiansk Raion
- Hromada: Vylykyi Burluk rural hromada

Zelenyi Hai (Ukrainian: Зелений Гай) is a village in Kupiansk Raion, Kharkiv Oblast, Ukraine. It belongs to Velykyi Burluk rural hromada, one of the hromadas of Ukraine.

Until 18 July 2020, Zelenyi Hai belonged to Velykyi Burluk Raion. The raion was abolished in July 2020 as part of the administrative reform of Ukraine, which reduced the number of raions of Kharkiv Oblast to seven. The area of Velykyi Burluk Raion was merged into Kupiansk Raion.

== History ==
On 22 January 2025, Russian forces claimed to have captured the town.
