= Kharkiv Regiment =

Kharkiv Regiment Харківський полк
- Regimental flag
- Active: 1651 – 1765
- Type: Cossack Regiment
- Size: 19 sotnias (1732)
- Garrison/HQ: Kharkiv, Ukraine

Commanders
- Notable commanders: Ivan Sirko; Grigory Donets-Zakharzhevsky

The Kharkiv Sloboda Cossack Regiment (Ukrainian: Харківський слобідський козацький полк) was one of five territorial-administrative subdivisions of the Sloboda Ukraine. The regiment's capital was the city of Kharkiv, now in Kharkiv Oblast of Eastern Ukraine.

The Kharkiv Regiment appeared between 1651 and 1659 years. In 1732 it consisted of 19 sotnias. In 1765, the sloboda regiments was abolished, and its territory was reformed into the Sloboda Ukraine Governorate.

== Preconditions of appearance ==
The settlement of future regimental lands by settlers from the territory of the Polish–Lithuanian Commonwealth took place against the backdrop of uninterrupted military operations in the Dnieper and Western Ukraine, burdened by punitive expeditions of the Polish–Lithuanian Commonwealth, as well as by fratricidal civil war involving foreign troops (Tatars and Turks).

The first wave of immigrants from the Right Bank Ukraine to the territory of the Moscow kingdom to the border with Wild Field followed the defeat of the troops of Bogdan Khmelnytsky in the Battle of Berestechko in 1651. The western part of the Polish-Moscow treaty was reaffirmed by the Polish–Lithuanian Commonwealth. Hetman Bohdan Khmelnytsky publishes a versatile person that allowed the population to relocate to the land of the Moscow kingdom.

After the death of hetman Bohdan Khmelnitsky, authority passed into the hands of hetman Ivan Vyhovsky. A period of civil war (1657-1658) began between supporters of the Moscow and Polish courses, the so-called "The Ruin". The population once again began to move to calmer areas under the authority of the Moscow tsars.

== Structure of the regiment ==
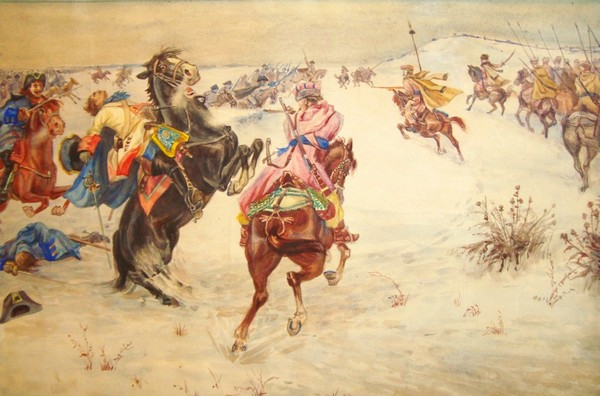
Fight of the Cossacks of the Kharkiv Regiment with the Swedes during Siege of Veprik

=== Regiment starshina ===
At the head of the regiment were elected colonels and regimental starshina (officers). They were chosen not for a limited time, but for life. However, they could be deprived of the position by the Russian tsar (later the emperor), or by a decision of the assembly of the elders.

The colonel of the Slobodsky Cossack regiment represented both administrative and military power. The colonel had the right to issue decrees, with his signature - universal. The symbol of the colonel's power was a pernach, a regimental crown, a colonel seal.

The regimental starshina (headquarters) consisted of six people: an obozni (quartermaster), a judge, an osavul, a khorunzhy, a two chancellors.

- Regimental Obozni (Quartermaster) (Ukrainian: Полковий обозний) is the first Deputy Colonel. He was in charge of artillery and fortress fortifications. In the absence of a colonel he replaced him, but he was not authorized to issue universal orders (as opposed to the commanding colonel).
- Regimental Judge (Ukrainian: Полковий суддя) was in charge of a civil court in the ratusha.
- Regimental Osavul (Ukrainian: Полковий осавул) is the assistant Colonel in Military Affairs
- Regimental Khorunzhy (Ukrainian: Полковий хорунжий) is the commander of the "Khorunzhy Cossacks", guarding the colonel and the starshina. He was in charge of regimental music and was responsible for keeping the khorugv (regiment flag).
- Regimental Chancellor (Ukrainian: Полковий писар) are secretaries at the ratusha. One was in charge of military affairs, and the other was civilian affairs.

=== Sotnia starshina ===
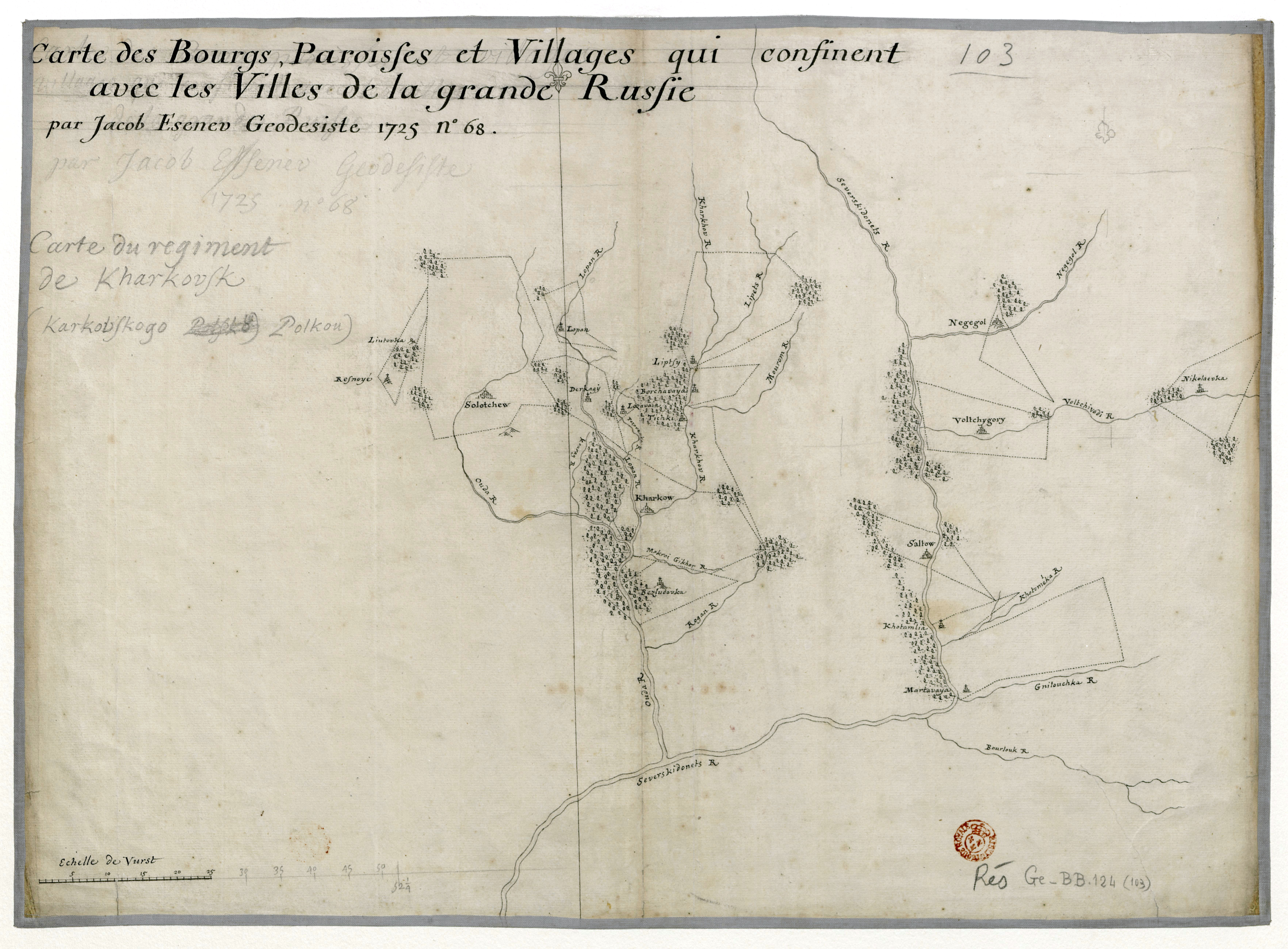
A 1725 geodesy map of Kharkiv regiment

The regiment was divided into sotnias.

Sotnia is an administrative unit within the regiment. A Sotnia was headed by a sotnik. He was endowed with extensive military, administrative, judicial and financial powers. Originally elected by the Cossacks of the sotnia, later he was chosen by a sotnia starshina and was confirmed by the colonels from among the elders.

The Sotnia starshina (headquarters) consisted of a sotnik, a Sotnia otaman, an osavul, a chancellor and a khorunzhy. The positions of the duties coincided with the regimental ones:

- Sotenny Otaman (Ukrainian: Сотенний отаман) is the deputy sotnik. Implemented the duties of an obozni and a judge on a sotnia level.
- Sotenny Osavul (Ukrainian: Сотенний осавул) is the assistant sotnik in Military Affairs.
- Sotenny Khorunzhy (Ukrainian: Сотенний хорунжий) headed the sotnias flags.
- Sotenny Chancellor (Ukrainian: Сотенний писар) is a secretary.
