= Volchansky Uyezd =

Volchansky Uyezd Волчанский уездъ
- Former subdivision of the Russian Empire
- 1780–1923
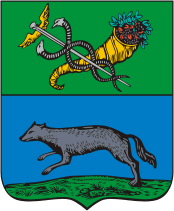
- Coat of arms

- Capital: Volchansk
- Population
  - (1897): 166 787
- History
  - Established: 1780
  - Disestablished: 1923

Volchansky Uyezd (Russian: Волчанский уезд; Ukrainian: Вовчанський повіт, romanized: Vovchanskyi povit) was an uyezd (district) in the Kharkov Governorate of the Russian Empire.

== History ==
This uyezd was created on April 25, 1780 by order of the Empress Catherine the Great. The administrative centre of uyezd was small town Volchansk. Since 1781 Volchansk got its own coat of arms.

The uyezd had one town (Volchansk) and consisted of 14 volosts.

In the 1890s, the railway was built through the uyezd and the Volchansk railway station was built in 1896 in Volchansk.

In January 1897, according to the Russian Empire Census, the population of the uyezd was 166 787 people.

By the Soviet administrative reform of 1923, the uyezd was transformed into Vovchansk Raion.

== Demographics ==
At the time of the Russian Empire Census of 1897, Volchansky Uyezd had a population of 166,787. Of these, 74.8% spoke Ukrainian and 25.0% Russian as their native language.

== Sources ==
- Волчанск // Энциклопедический словарь Брокгауза и Ефрона : в 86 т. (82 т. и 4 доп.). — Т. 7. СПб., 1892.
