= Izyumsky Uyezd =

Administrative subdivision of Kharkov Governorate, Russian Empire

- Former subdivision of the Russian Empire
- 1797–1923
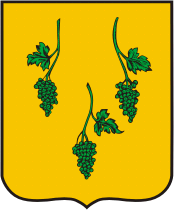
- Coat of arms

- Capital: Izium
- Population
  - (1897): 280 474
- History
  - Established: 1797
  - Disestablished: 1923

Izyumsky Uyezd (Russian: Изюмский уезд; Ukrainian: Ізюмський повіт) was one of the subdivisions of the Kharkov Governorate of the Russian Empire. It was situated in the southeastern part of the governorate. Its administrative centre was Izium (Izyum).

== Demographics ==
At the time of the Russian Empire Census of 1897, Izyumsky Uyezd had a population of 280,474. Of these, 86.2% spoke Ukrainian, 12.0% Russian, 1.5% German, 0.1% Yiddish and 0.1% Polish as their native language.
