= Kupyansky Uyezd =

County of Kharkov province

- Former subdivision of the Russian Empire
- 1797–1923
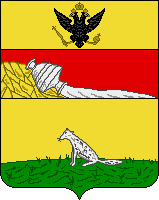
- Coat of arms

- Capital: Kupyansk
- Population
  - (1897): 234 182
- History
  - Established: 1797
  - Disestablished: 1923

Kupyansky Uyezd (Russian: Купянский уезд; Ukrainian: Куп'янський повіт, romanized: Kupianskyi povit) was one of the subdivisions of the Kharkov Governorate of the Russian Empire. It was situated in the southeastern part of the governorate. Its administrative centre was Kupiansk (Kupyansk).

== Demographics ==
At the time of the Russian Empire Census of 1897, Kupyansky Uyezd had a population of 234,182. Of these, 86.6% spoke Ukrainian, 13.2% Russian and 0.1% Polish as their native language.
