= Kharkov Governorate =

1765–1925 administrative unit in present day Ukraine

Coordinates: 50.0000°N 36.2292°E

Sloboda Ukraine Governorate (1765–1780),(1796–1835) Kharkov Viceroyalty (1780–1796) Kharkov Governorate (1835–1917) Kharkiv Governorate (1918–1925)
- 1765–1925
- Coat of arms

- Location in the Russian Empire
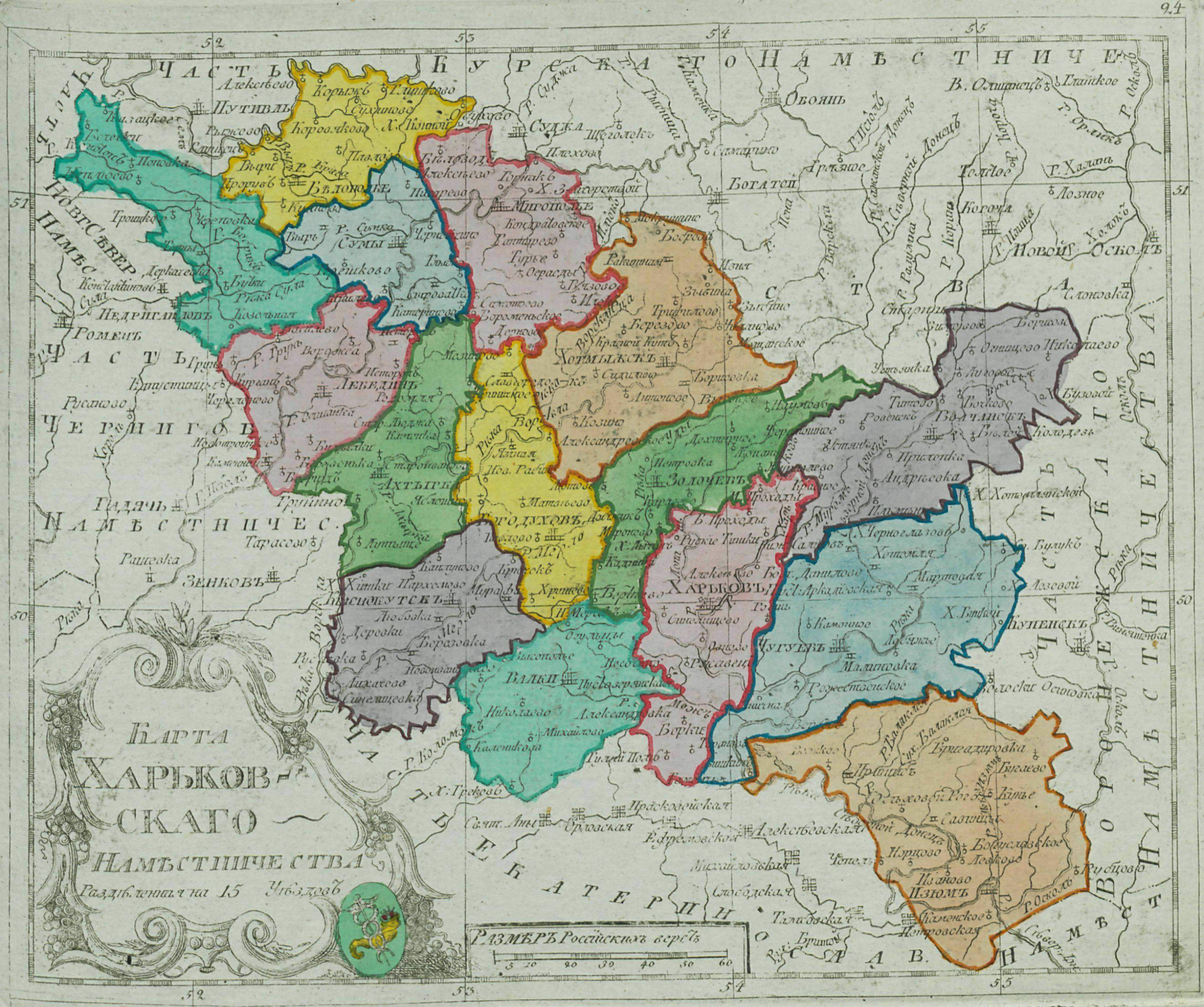
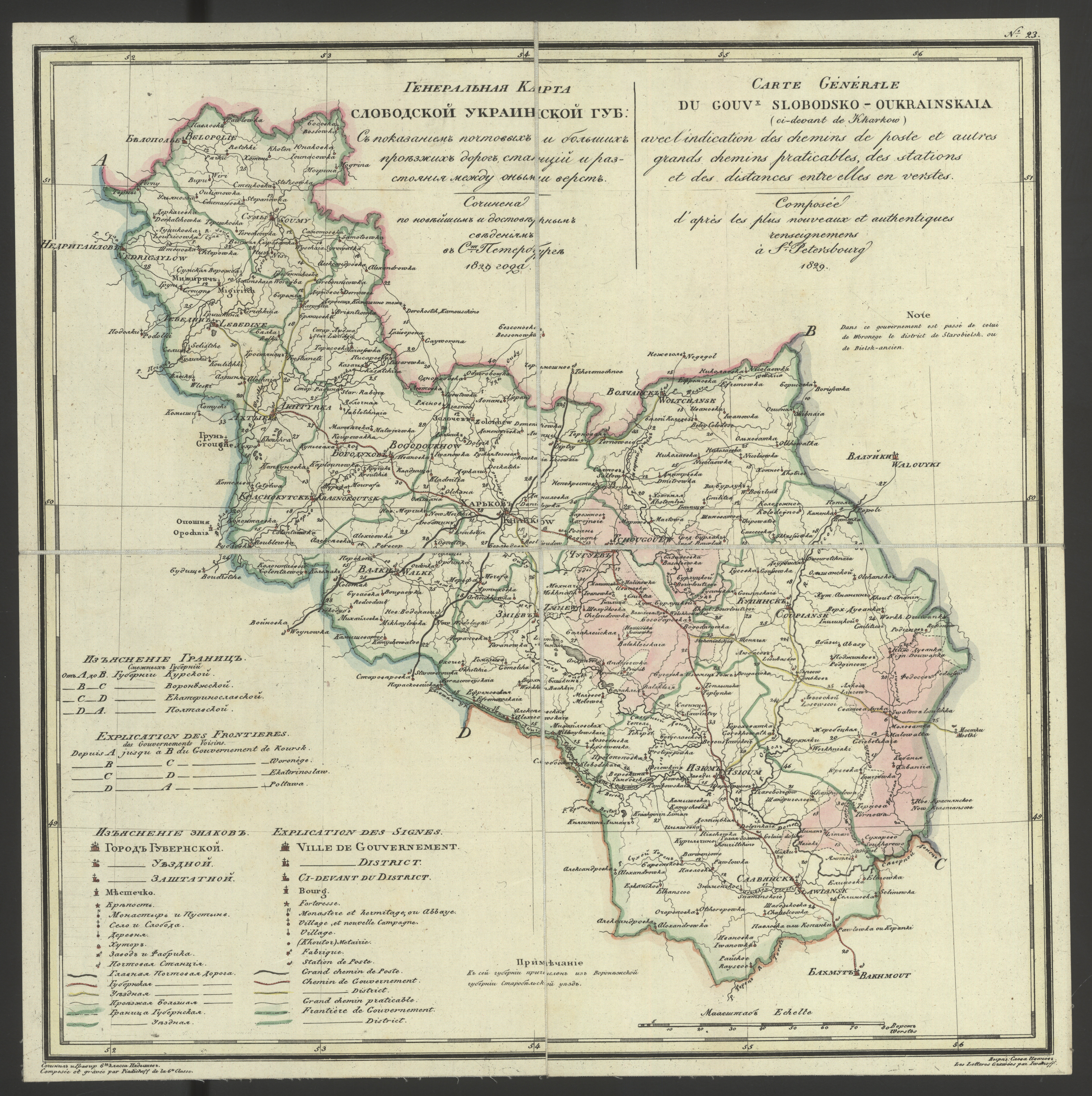
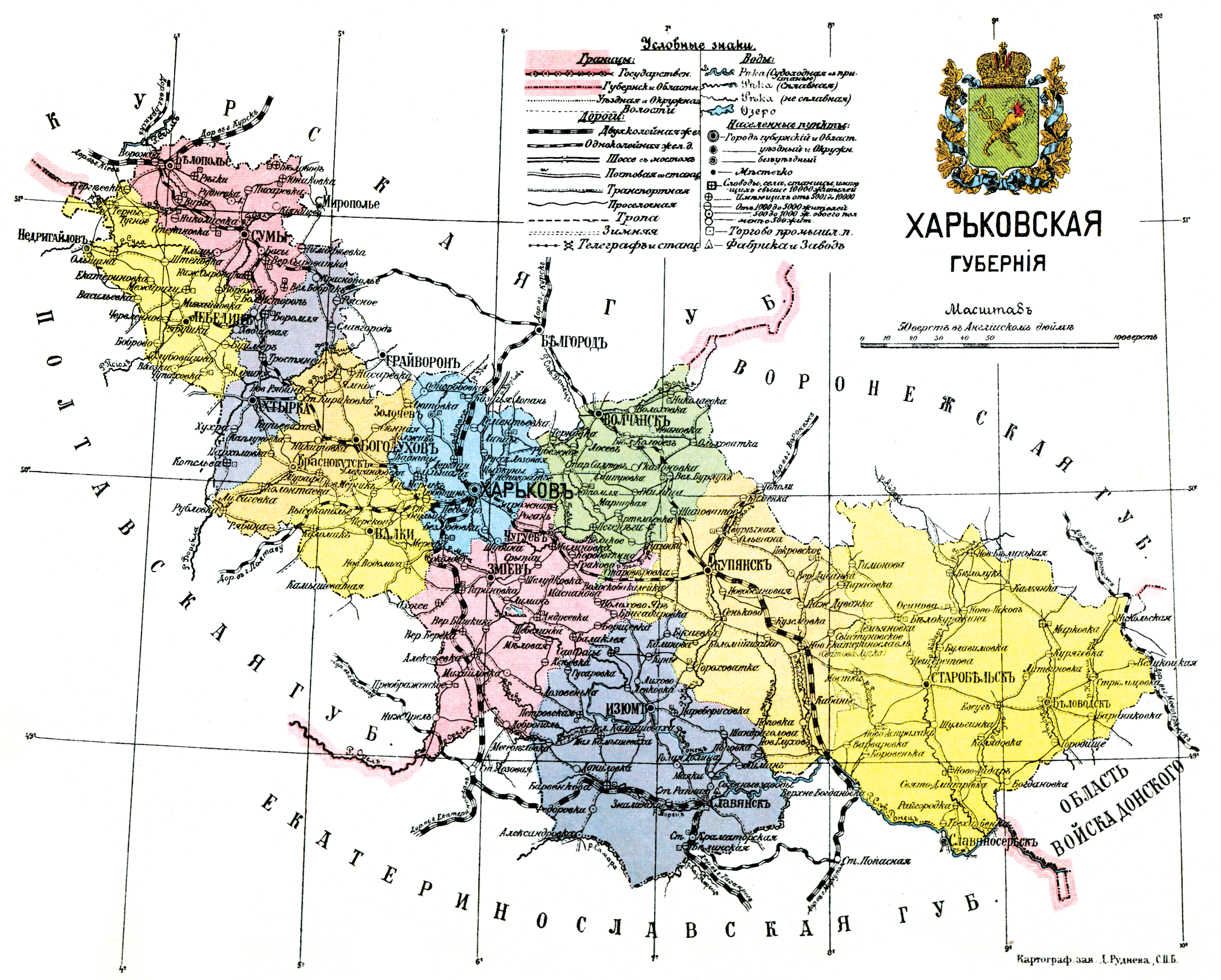
- Capital: Kharkov/Kharkiv
- Area
  - (1897): 54,493 km^{2} (21,040 sq mi)
- Population
  - (1897): 2,492,316
- History
  - Established: 1765
  - Abolished: 1925
Preceded by
Kharkiv Regiment
Sumy Regiment
Okhtyrka Regiment
Izyum Regiment
Ostrogozhsk Regiment
Succeeded by
Donetsk Governorate
Kharkiv Okruha
Sumy Okruha
Izium Okruha
Kupiansk Okruha

Kharkov Governorate (Note: Russian: Харьковская губерния, pre-1918: Харьковская губернія, romanized: Khar'kovskaya guberniya; Ukrainian: Харківська губернія, romanized: Kharkivsʼka huberniia) was an administrative-territorial unit (guberniya) of the Russian Empire founded in 1835. It embraced the historical region of Sloboda Ukraine. From 1765 to 1780 and from 1796 to 1835 the governorate was called Sloboda Ukraine Governorate. In 1780–1796 there existed the Kharkov Vicegerency (Ukrainian: намісництво, romanized: namisnytstvo; Russian: намесничество, romanized: namestnichestvo).

From 1765 to 1780, the Sloboda Ukraine Governorate existed. In 1780, the Kharkov Viceroyalty was established and lasted until 1796. In 1835, the Viceroyalty was again reorganized into the Sloboda-Ukrainian Governorate, and from 1835 onwards, the Kharkov Governorate was formed, which existed until 1925. With each reorganization, the boundaries and administrative structure change significantly. The main state tax implementation, processing, and publishing of statistical information for the Kharkov governorate was the Kharkov Governorate Statistical Committee.

== History ==
=== Sloboda Ukraine Governorate (1765–1780) ===
After the abolition of the Cossack system in Sloboda Ukraine, Sloboda Ukraine Governorate was set up in 1765 on the former territory of the Sloboda Cossack regiments, with its capital in Kharkiv (historically known as Kharkov). The dissolved regiments were Kharkiv Regiment, Sumy Regiment, Okhtyrka Regiment, Izium Regiment, and Ostrogozhsk Regiment.

=== Kharkov Viceroyalty (1780–1796) ===
In 1780, Sloboda Ukraine Governorate was dissolved and reorganized into the Kharkov Viceroyalty in accordance with an April 25, 1780 decree signed by Catherine the Great. It was formed of the uezds of Akhtyrsky Uyezd, Belopolsky, Bogodukhovsky Uyezd, Valkovsky, Volchansky Uyezd, Zolochevsky, Izyumsky Uyezd, Krasnokutsky, Lebedinsky Uyezd, Miropolsky, Nedrigailovsky, Sumsky Uyezd, Kharkovsky Uyezd, Khotmyzhsky, and Chuguevsky.

=== Sloboda Ukraine Governorate (1796–1835) ===
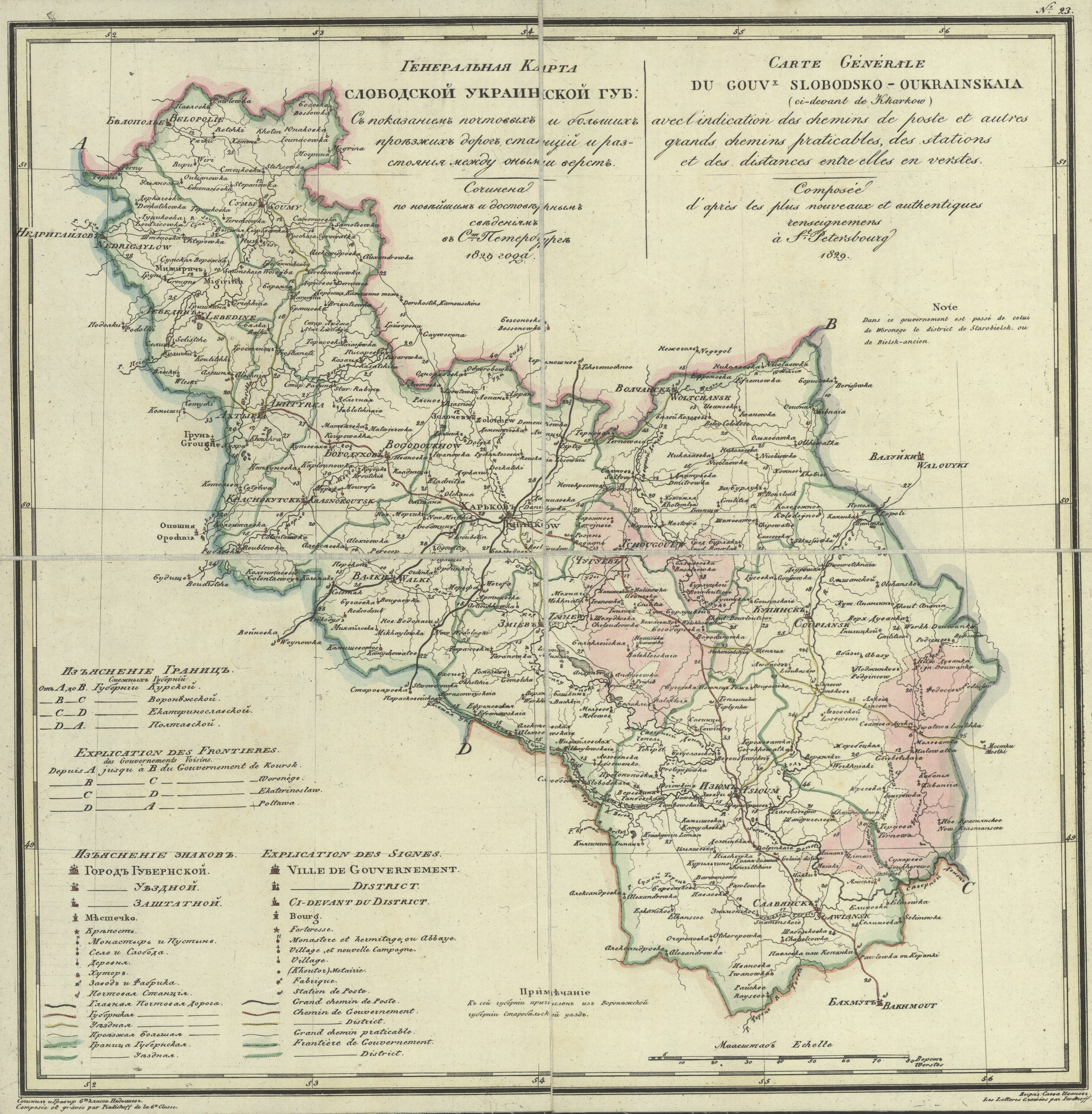
Piadyshev, Vasilij Petrovich – Sloboda Ukraine Governorate 1829

All viceroyalties of the Russian Empire were abolished in 1797, and replaced again by governorates. As part of this reform, the Kharkov Viceroyalty was abolished in 1797, and the Sloboda Ukraine Governorate was re-established. It contained the former Kharkov Viceroyalty's territory, as well as several uyezds from Voronezh Governorate. It was divided into 10 uezds: Akhtyrsky Uyezd, Bogodukhovsky, Valkovsky, Volchansky Uyezd, Zmievsky, Izyumsky Uyezd, Kupyansky Uyezd, Lebedinsky Uyezd, Sumsky Uyezd, and Kharkovsky Uyezd.

=== Kharkov Governorate (1835–1917) ===
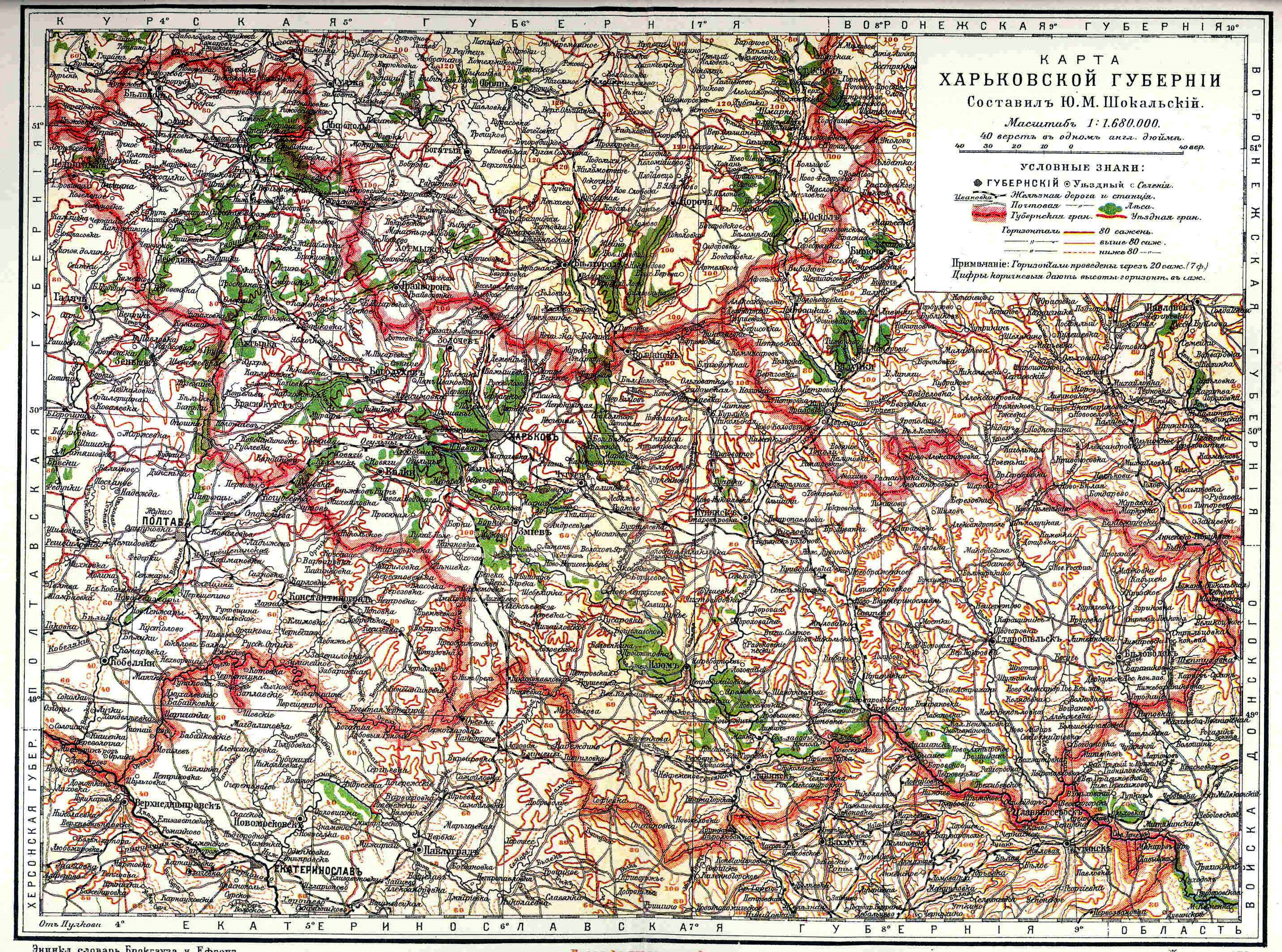
Map of Kharkov Governorate in between 1890 and 1906

In 1835, Sloboda Ukraine Governorate was renamed to Kharkov Governorate. It consisted of eleven uyezds. In the same year, the Kharkov Governorate was incorporated to the Little Russian Governor-General. The Governor-residence General was originally in Poltava but has been in Kharkov since 1837. By 1856, the governorate had grown to 13 counties, and the final administrative division had been established. Kharkov was the seat of the Orthodox Kharkov Diocese and the Kharkov Educational District, as well as the judicial authority for the governorates of Kharkov, Kursk, Voronezh, Oryol, Yekaterinoslav, and Tambov, and the Kharkov Military District administration from 1864 to 1888. The governorate's territory was excluded from the Pale of Settlement. Nevertheless, Jews were permitted to visit Kharkov during the fairs.

The newspaper Kharkovskie Gubernskie Vedomosti was first published in 1838. The Zemstvo was founded as part of the Zemstvo reform. On 21 February [O.S. 9 February] 1879, the terrorist Grigory Goldenberg assassinated Governor D. N. Kropotkin. General M. T. Loris-Melikov was appointed temporary governor-general of the Kharkov Governorate on April 7, 1879, and commanding officer of the Kharkov Military District on April 17, the same year.

=== Kharkiv Governorate (1918–1925) ===
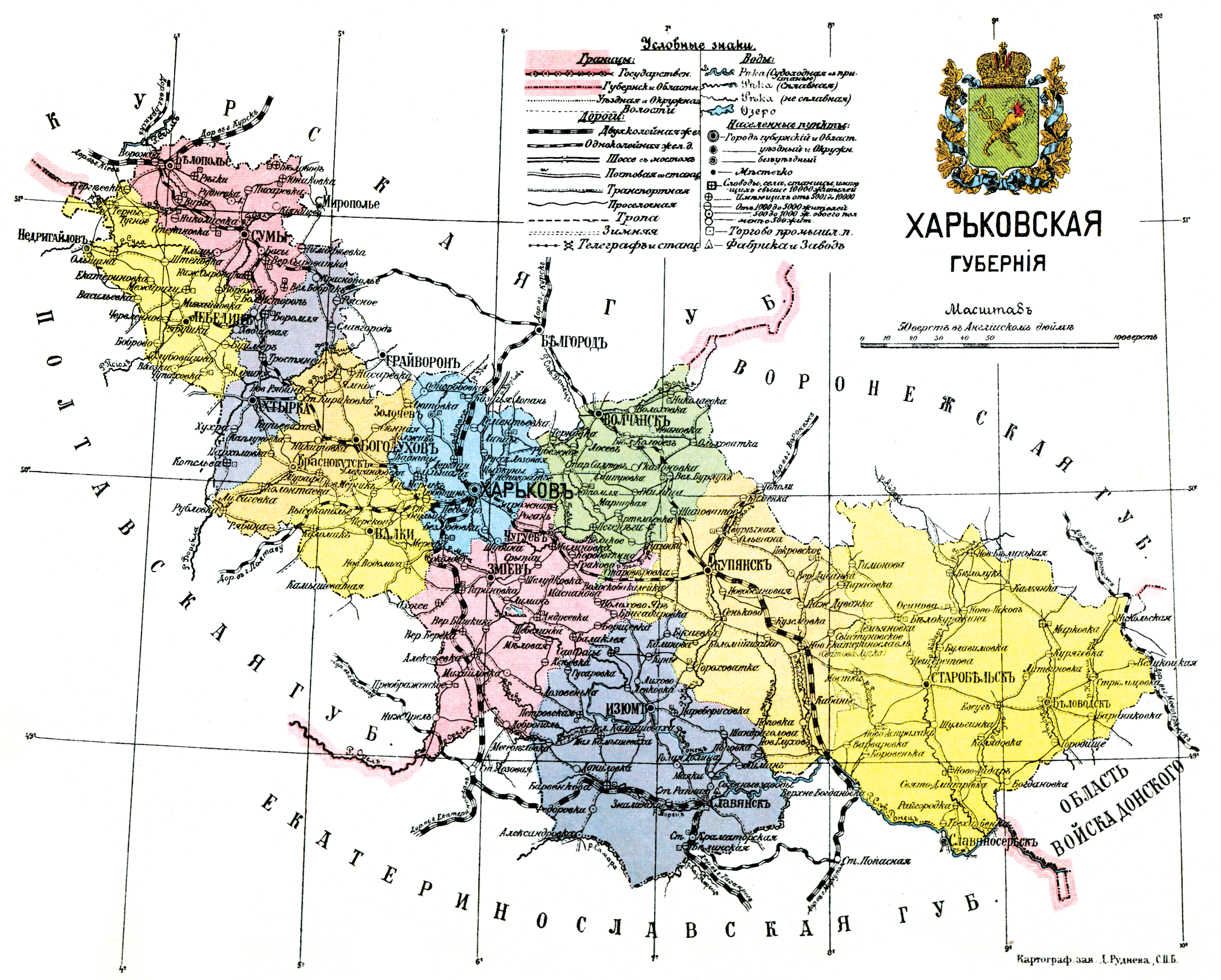
Kharkov Governorate administrative divisions in 1913

Kharkiv Governorate (Ukrainian: Харківська губернія, romanized: Kharkivska huberniia) was a governorate of Ukraine from 1918 to 1925. The region was re-established in 1918 as the Kharkov Governorate plus southern regions of Kursk Governorate and Voronezh Governorate. The governorate had international borders with the Don Republic to the east and the Soviet Russia to the north. During occupation by the Volunteer Army in 1919–1920, it was transformed into the Kharkov Oblast and expanded including several governorates. According to Soviet historians, in 1920–1921, 57 anti-Bolshevik insurgent detachments operated on the territory of the governorate, the number of some of them reaching several hundreds.

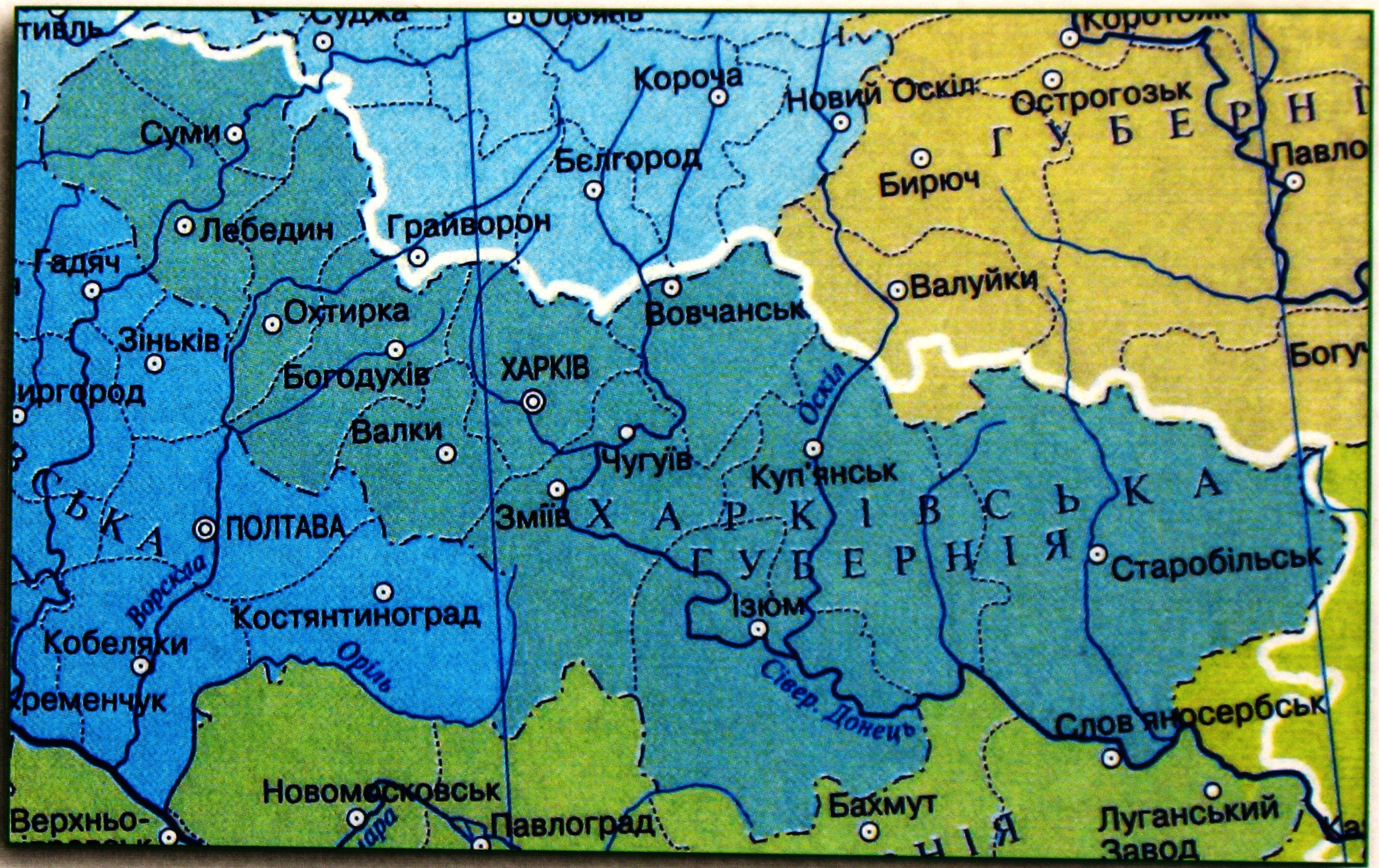
Kharkov Governorate in 1917

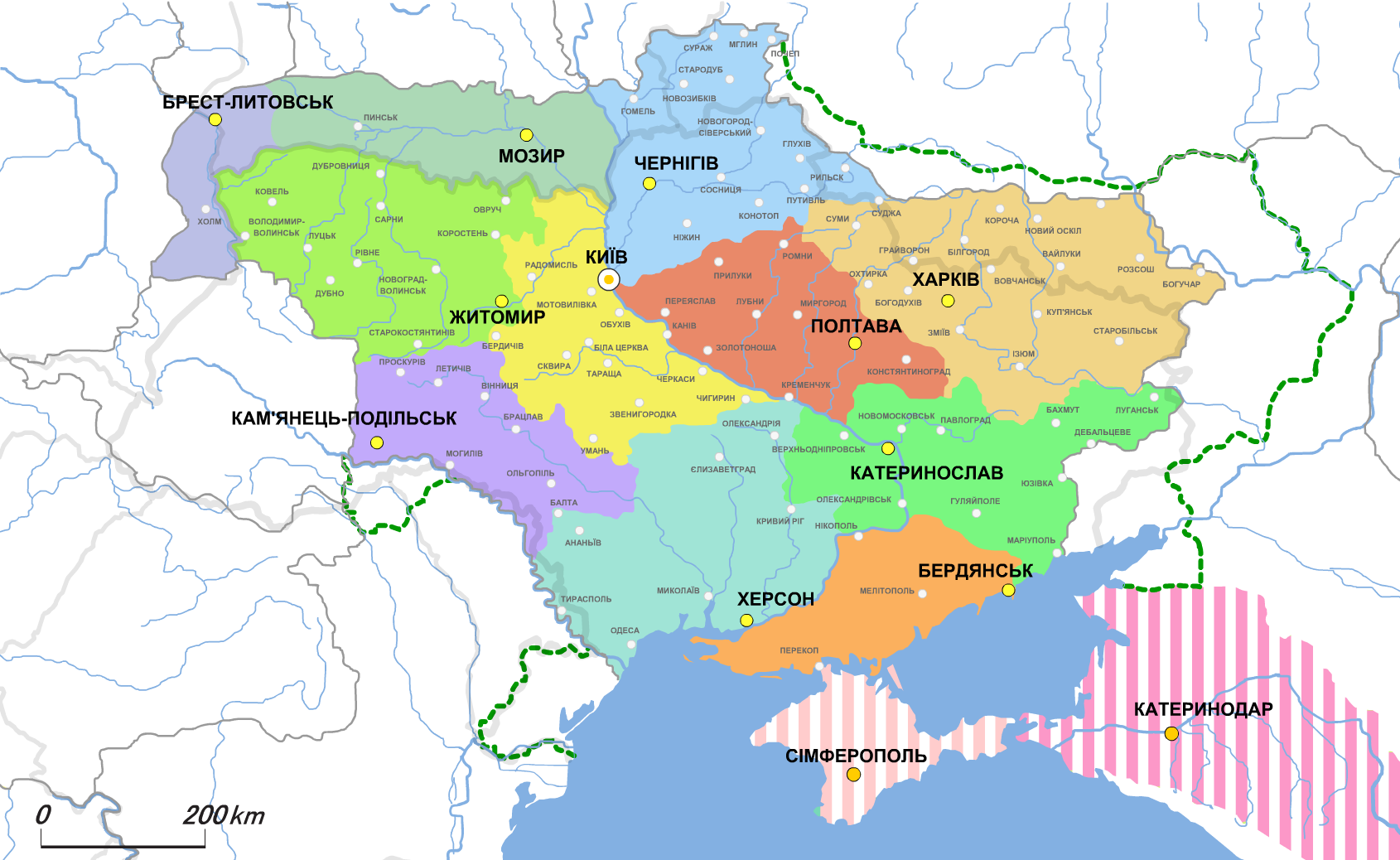
Kharkiv Governorate (beige) in the Ukrainian State

The Izyumsky and Starobelsky uezds of Kharkov Governorate were transferred to the newly established Donetsk Governorate in 1920. Zmiev uezd was split into Zmiev and Chuguevsky uezds in December 1919. The government of the Ukrainian SSR adopted a new system of administrative division of the republic's territory on March 7, 1923, by Decree of the Presidium of the All-Ukrainian Central Executive Committee No. 315 of March 7, 1923. Okrugs and raions replaced uyezds and volosts. Instead of 10 uezds, the governorate was divided into 5 okrugs, as well as 227 volosts divided into 77 raions. Kharkov Governorate was divided into okrugs, according to the new administrative-territorial division system, Raion–Okrug–Governorate–Capital: Kharkov (24 raions), Bogodukhovsky (12 raions), Izyumsky (11 raions), Kupyansky (12 raions), and Sumy (16 raions).

In 1924, it had a population of 2,728,400, of whom 20% lived in cities, of whom in turn only 55% were Ukrainians.

=== Abolition (1925) ===
All of the Ukrainian SSR's governorates, including Kharkov, were abolished in June 1925, and the governorate's okrugs were transferred to the Ukrainian SSR's direct subordination (with its capital in Kharkiv). Based on a decision of the 9th All-Ukrainian Congress of Soviets, the All-Ukrainian Central Executive Committee signed a decree on June 3, 1925, establishing a new territorial division throughout the Ukrainian SSR based on the principle of a three-stage system of government (without governorates): Okrug–Raion–Capital. Kharkiv Oblast, which contains most of the territory of the former governorate, was formed in 1932.

== Demographics ==
=== 1897 Russian Census ===
- By the Imperial census of 1897. In **bold** are languages spoken by more people than the state language.

Language	Number	percentage (%)	males	females
**Little Russian (Ukrainian)**	2 009 411	80.62	1 004 372	1 005 039
Great Russian (Russian)	440 936	17.69	225 803	215 133
Yiddish	12 650	0.5	7 007	5 643
White Russian (Belarusian)	10 258	0.41	4 936	5 322
German	9 080	0.36	4 504	4 576
Polish	5 910	0.23	4 056	1 854
Tatar	1 358	>0.1	1 221	137
Persons that didn't name their native language	44	>0.01	23	21
Other (Note: Languages, number of speakers which in all gubernia were less than 1000)	2 669	0.1	1 700	969
Total	2 492 316	100	1 253 759	1 238 557

== Uyezds of Kharkov Governorate ==
County		County Town	Arms of County Town	Area	Population (1897 census)
Transliteration name	Russian Cyrillic	County Town	Arms of County Town	Area	Population (1897 census)
Akhtyrsky	Ахтырский	Akhtyrka		2,778.69 km^{2} (1,072.86 mi^{2})	161,243
Bogodukhovsky	Богодуховский	Bogodukhov		3,224.32 km^{2} (1,244.92 mi^{2})	159,806
Valkovsky	Валковский	Valki		2,842.87 km^{2} (1,097.64 mi^{2})	144,322
Volchansky	Волчанский	Volchansk		3,961.59 km^{2} (1,529.58 mi^{2})	166,787
Zmiev	Змиевской	Zmiev		5,690.31 km^{2} (2,197.04 mi^{2})	231,491
Izyumsky	Изюмский	Izyum		7,315.16 km^{2} (2,824.40 mi^{2})	280,474
Kupyansky	Купянский	Kupyansk		6,908.03 km^{2} (2,667.21 mi^{2})	234,182
Lebedinsky	Лебединский	Lebedin		3,098.94 km^{2} (1,196.51 mi^{2})	178,144
Starobelsky	Старобельский	Starobelsk		12,343.65 km^{2} (4,765.91 mi^{2})	359,285
Sumsky	Сумской	Sumy		3,187.71 km^{2} (1,230.78 mi^{2})	228,094
Kharkovsky	Харьковский	Kharkov		3,306.07 km^{2} (1,276.48 mi^{2})	348,488
