= Vilcha, Kharkiv Oblast =

Rural locality in Kharkiv Oblast, Ukraine

Vilcha Вільча
- Rural settlement
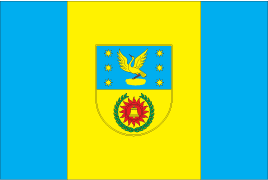
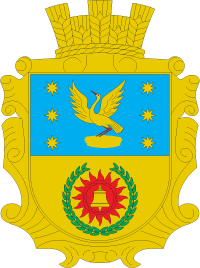
- Flag Coat of arms

- Location of Vilcha in Kharkiv Oblast Location of Vilcha in Ukraine
- Coordinates: 50°14′41″N 36°56′29″E
- Country: Ukraine
- Oblast: Kharkiv Oblast
- Raion: Chuhuiv Raion
- Founded: 1993

Government
  - Mayor: Mykola Lirskyj

Area
  - Land: 3.68 km^{2} (1.42 sq mi)

Population (2001)
  - Total: 1,658
  - Estimate (2026): 2
  - Density: 451/km^{2} (1,170/sq mi)
- Postal code: 62507
- Area code: +380 5741

Vilcha (Ukrainian: Вільча) is a Ukrainian rural settlement in Chuhuiv Raion (prior to 2020 in Vovchansk Raion) in Kharkiv Oblast. It belongs to Vovchansk urban hromada, one of the hromadas of Ukraine. Population: 1,639 (2022 estimate).

Until 18 July 2020, Vilcha belonged to Vovchansk Raion. The raion was abolished in July 2020 as part of the administrative reform of Ukraine, which reduced the number of raions of Kharkiv Oblast to seven. The area of Vovchansk Raion was merged into Chuhuiv Raion. On 26 January 2024, a new law entered into force which abolished the status of urban-type settlement, and Vilcha became a rural settlement.

== Geography ==
Located 6 km south of Vovchansk, and not too far from the borders with the Russian Oblast of Belgorod; Vilcha it is served by the provincial highway T2104, and by Harbuzivka railway station, on Belgorod-Kupiansk line. The town is 20 km far from Bilyi Kolodiaz, 26 from Staryi Saltiv, 52 from Velykyi Burluk, 56 from Belgorod and 71 from Kharkiv.

== History ==
The urban-type settlement, sometimes named New Vilcha, was founded in 1993, when the 2,000 residents of the Old Vilcha (709 km far, in Kyiv Oblast), located 45 km from the Chernobyl Nuclear Power Plant, moved here in the period 1993–1996. Immediately after the accident of 1986, the "Exclusion Zone" was recognized only in the area within a radius of 30 km from the nuclear plant.

The idea of creating a village built up with typical cottage-type houses where people were settled so that their relatives were next to them ("dachas") was conceived back in 1989. The Soviet authorities presented Vilcha as a showcase for the concept. The center of the village was to be dedicated to an industry along with a laundromat, a branch of the Kharkov Radio Plant, a hotel, a youth sports and entertainment complex with 400 seats, greenhouses and a swimming pool.

=== Russo-Ukrainian War ===
During the initial eastern campaign of the 2022 Russian invasion of Ukraine, the village was occupied by Russia during the first days the conflict. It was retaken by Ukrainian forces later that year during the 2022 Kharkiv counteroffensive. Russian forces began combat operations in the area of Vilcha once again on 10 May 2024 during the 2024 Kharkiv offensive. By February 2026, the village was captured by the Russian forces.

== Social sphere ==
- Kindergarten;
- School;
- Church of St. Vladimir the Equal to the Apostles;
- Vilchansk Family Medicine Clinic;
- Vovchansk Geriatric Nursing Home.

=== Enterprises ===
- Vilchansk Municipal Enterprises Plant;
- Lyman-Vilcha, LLC.

== See also ==
- Vilcha, Kyiv Oblast
