= Konstantin Olshansky =

Soviet marine (1915 – 1944)

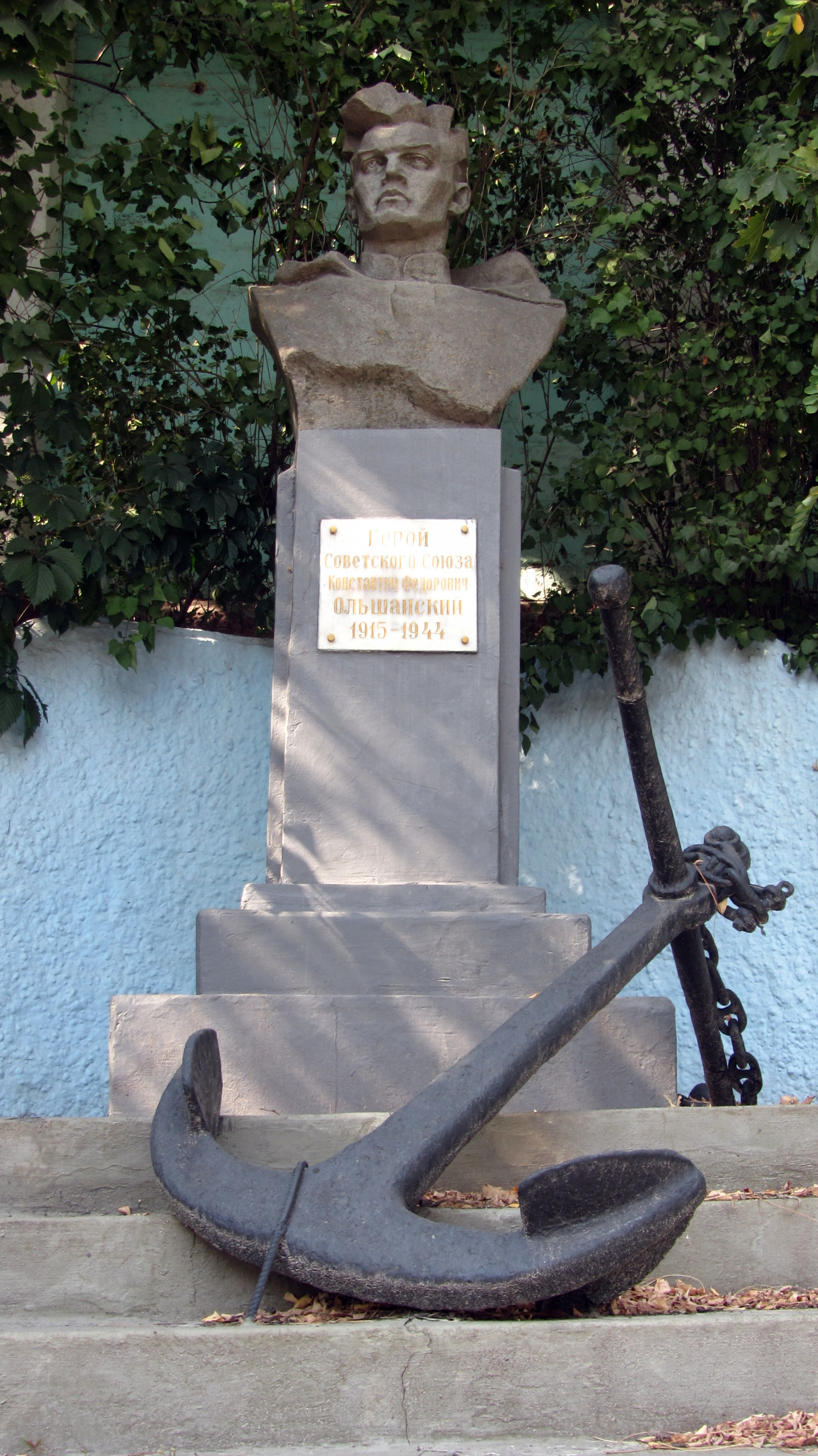
Memorial bust of Olshansky in Mykolaiv

Konstantin Fyodorovich Olshansky (Russian: Константин Фёдорович Ольшанский, Ukrainian: Костянтин Федорович Ольшанський, romanized: Kostiantyn Fedorovych Olshanskyi; 21 May 1915 – 27 March 1944) was a Senior Lieutenant and Soviet marine of the Black Sea Fleet, born in Prykolotne, Ukraine. He died during an assault on the port of Mykolaiv, Ukraine, formerly Nikolaev, occupied in World War II by German forces, and was posthumously awarded Hero of the Soviet Union.

== Legacy ==
Among other commemorations, the landing ship U402 Konstantin Olshansky (Костянтин Ольшанський) (Ukrainian Navy), formerly BDK-56 (Soviet Navy), the settlement of Olshanske in Mykolaiv Oblast, Ukraine, and the minor planet 2310 Olshaniya were named after him.

== See also ==
- Ukrainian landing ship Konstantin Olshansky
