= Bilyi Kolodiaz =

Rural locality in Kharkiv Oblast, Ukraine

Bilyi Kolodiaz Білий Колодязь
- Rural settlement
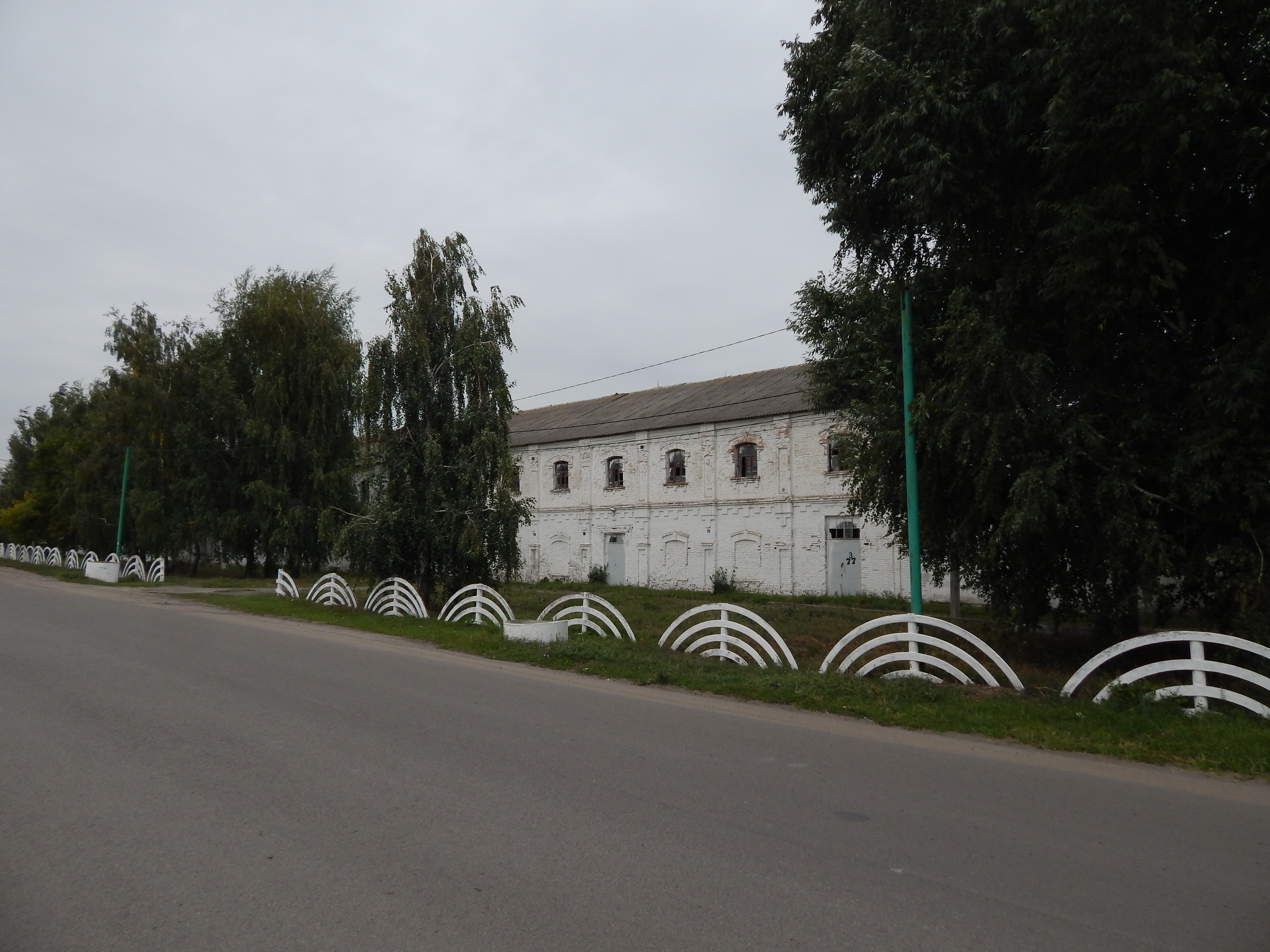
- Bilyi Kolodiaz sugar refinery
- Interactive map of Bilyi Kolodiaz
- Location in Kharkiv Oblast Location in Ukraine
- Coordinates: 50°12′22″N 37°06′35″E
- Country: Ukraine
- Oblast: Kharkiv Oblast
- Raion: Chuhuiv Raion
- Hromada: Vovchansk urban hromada
- Established: c. 1761

Area
  - Total: 15.6 km^{2} (6.0 sq mi)

Population (2022)
  - Total: 3.601
  - Density: 0.231/km^{2} (0.598/sq mi)
- Time zone: UTC+2 (EET)
  - Summer (DST): UTC+3 (EEST)
- Postal code 1: 62540
- Area code: +380 5741
- KATOTTH: UA63140010020090502

Bilyi Kolodiaz (Ukrainian: Білий Колодязь; Russian: Белый Колодезь) is a rural settlement in Chuhuiv Raion, Kharkiv Oblast, Ukraine. It is located at the northeast of the oblast, in the drainage basin of the Donets. Bilyi Kolodiaz belongs to Vovchansk urban hromada, one of the hromadas of Ukraine. Population: 3,601 (2022 estimate).

== Geography ==
The settlement of is located at the beginning of the Bilyi Yar, through which an unnamed river flows, 10 kilometres (6.2 mi) away, joining the Vovcha river. There are several dams on the river. The source of the Polna is 4 kilometres (2.5 mi) away.

The village of Yurchenkove is 1 kilometre (0.62 mi) away. The distance to the district center, the city of Volchansk, is 14 kilometres (8.7 mi) by road and 18 kilometres (11 mi) by rail. In the village there is a railway station Bely Kolodez on the Belgorod - Kupiansk railway line, the T-2104 road passes through.

== History ==
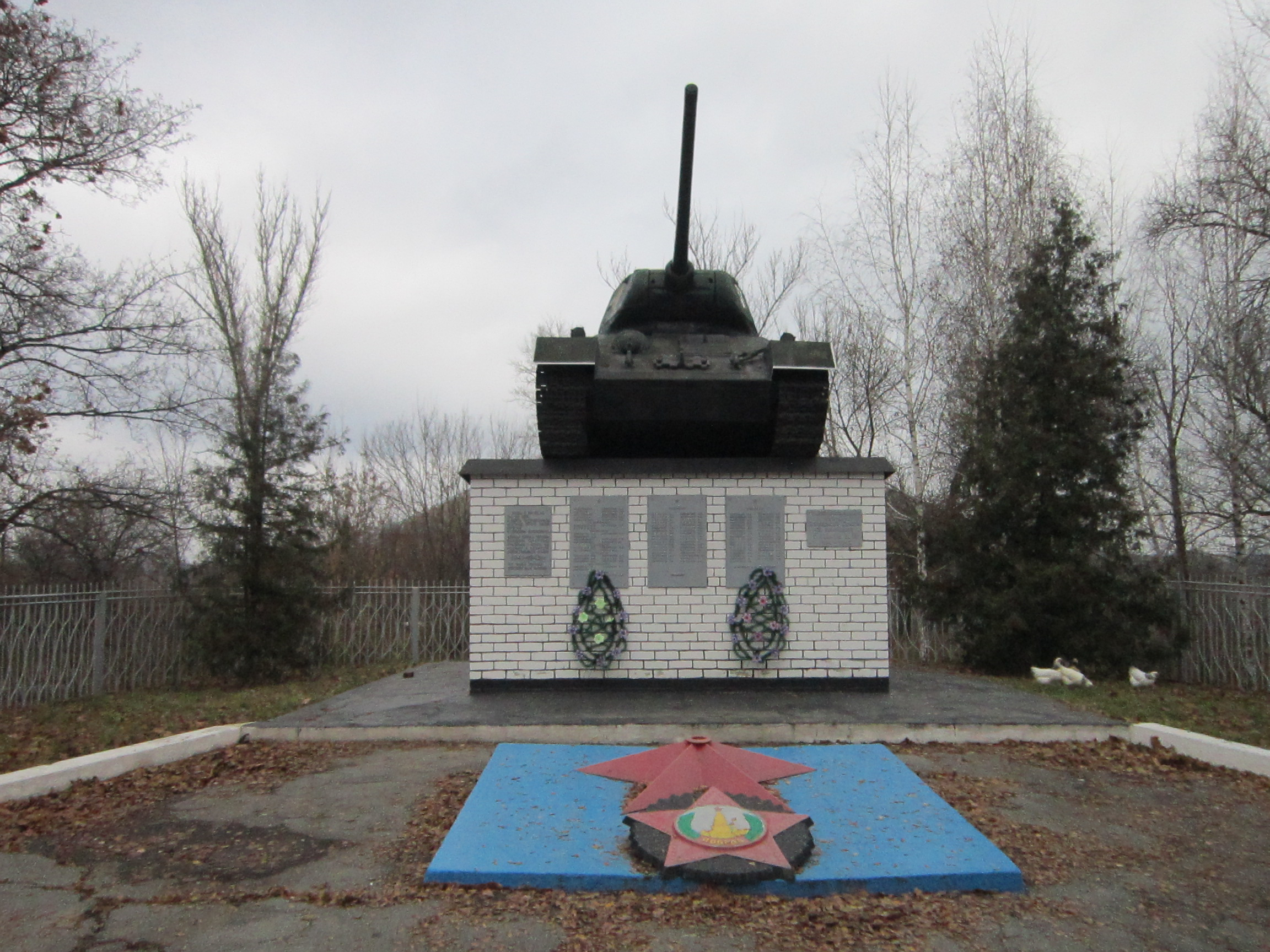
Mass grave of the fallen Red Army soldiers.

Sloboda Bely Kolodez was first mentioned in 1761. Count Ivan Simonovich Gendrikov (1719–1778) settled his peasants here and built a church in honor of the Iveron Icon of the Mother of God. Since 1780, it was part of the Volchansky Uyezd of the Kharkov Governorate.

In the 19th century, Bely Kolodez and the surrounding lands (approximately 12 thousand dessiatines) were the property of Anton Aleksandrovich Skalon, and then his grandson V. A. Skalon. The estate included an experimental field, a meteorological station, a large herd of cattle and horses, a sheep farm where fine-wool sheep were bred, a brick factory, a steam mill, and a sugar factory built around 1833—the first in the Kharkov province.

By the beginning of the 20th century, the village was the administrative center of the Belo-Kolodezskaya volost of the Volchansk district. Since 1923, it has been the center of the Belokolodezyansky district of the Kharkov district of the Ukrainian SSR. During the Great Patriotic War, from June 11, 1942 to 1943, the village was under German occupation. In May 1948, the restored 1st Sugar Factory named after Petrovsky became an enterprise of union significance and was transferred to the direct subordination of the Main Directorate of the Sugar Refining Industry of the Ministry of Food Industry of the USSR).

In 1956, the village received urban-type settlement status. In 1968, its population was 7,100; the largest enterprises were an auto repair plant and a sugar refinery. As of early 1978, the village had an auto repair plant, a sugar refinery, a bakery, the Belokolodezsky Elevator, a Volchansky Creamery workshop, a community center, three medical facilities, a club, and three libraries. In 1991, after the declaration of independence of Ukraine, the village ended up on the border with Russia, a border service department "Biliy Kolodyaz" was established here, which is in the area of responsibility of the Kharkiv border detachment of the Eastern regional administration of the State Border Service of Ukraine. In 1993, the village still had a car repair plant, a feed mill, a butter factory, a sugar factory with four branches: Belokolodezyansky, Zemlyansky, Kirovsky, and Volokhovsky; a fattening station, a fish farm, an agricultural chemical plant, a fuel warehouse, a bakery, a grain receiving station, an elevator, two secondary schools, and a boarding school. In July 1995, the Cabinet of Ministers of Ukraine approved a decision to privatize the sugar factory and sugar beet farm located in the village. In February 2003, the bankruptcy case against the factory began.

Until 18 July 2020, Bilyi Kolodiaz belonged to Vovchansk Raion. The raion was abolished in July 2020 as part of the administrative reform of Ukraine, which reduced the number of raions of Kharkiv Oblast to seven. The area of Vovchansk Raion was merged into Chuhuiv Raion. In 2022, the settlement was briefly occupied by Russian forces as part of the Russo-Ukrainian War.

Until 26 January 2024, Bilyi Kolodiaz was designated urban-type settlement. On this day, a new law entered into force which abolished this status, and Bilyi Kolodiaz became a rural settlement.

== Economy ==
=== Industry ===
The settlement has historically been a centre of sugar beet industry.

- Dairy farm;
- Machine and tractor workshops;
- Belokolodezyansky Repair and Mechanical Plant CJSC (closed);
- Petrovsky Sugar Factory;
- Feed mill;
- Butter mill (closed)
- Agricultural aviation airfield (closed);
- Bely Kolodez, agricultural enterprise;
- Bely Kolodez, sugar beet farm;
- Demetra, farm;
- Grain elevator;
- Bread factory (closed).

=== Transportation ===
Bilyi Kolodiaz railway station in on the railway connecting Vovchansk and Kupiansk. There is infrequent passenger traffic. The settlement has road connections with Vovchansk and with Prykolotne.

== Social facilities ==
- School;
- Community Center;
- Sports Ground;
- Pioneer Camp (closed);
- Church of the Iveron Icon of the Mother of God;
- Children's and Youth Library.

== Demographics ==
=== Population ===
In January 1989, the population was 5,108 people (2,317 men and 2,791 women). According to the 2001 census, the population was 4,330 people (1,971 men and 2,359 women) and as of August 2024, 350 people.

=== Language ===
Native language of the population according to the 2001 Census:

Lenguage	Speakers	Percent
Ukrainian	4 211	97,25 %
Russian	97	2,24 %
Others	22	0,51 %
All	4 330	100,00 %

== Notable people ==
- Nikita Pavlovich Blinov (1914–1942) — Hero of the Soviet Union, buried in the village of Bely Kolodez.
- Alexey Andreevich Veretenchenko (1918–1993) — Ukrainian poet, translator, and journalist.
- Alexander Ivanovich Kravchenko (1906–1987) — Hero of the Soviet Union.
- Mikhail Kuzmich Tokarenko (1919–1984) — Hero of the Soviet Union, born in the village of Bely Kolodez.
- Vasily Danilovich Yakovlev (1909–1980) — Soviet military leader, vice-admiral, born in the village of Bely Kolodez.
