= Vovcha (disambiguation) =

The Vovcha is a river in Ukraine, tributary of the Samara.

Vovcha may also refer to the following rivers:

- Vovcha (Kobeliachok), a tributary of Kobeliachok in Poltava Oblast, Ukraine
- Vovcha (Donets), a tributary of the Donets in Belgorod Oblast (Russia) and Kharkiv Oblast (Ukraine), also known as Volchya (in Russia) or Vovchi Vody (Wolf's Waters)
