= Staryi Saltiv =

Rural locality in Kharkiv Oblast, Ukraine

Staryi Saltiv Старий Салтів (Ukrainian) Saltiv
- Rural settlement
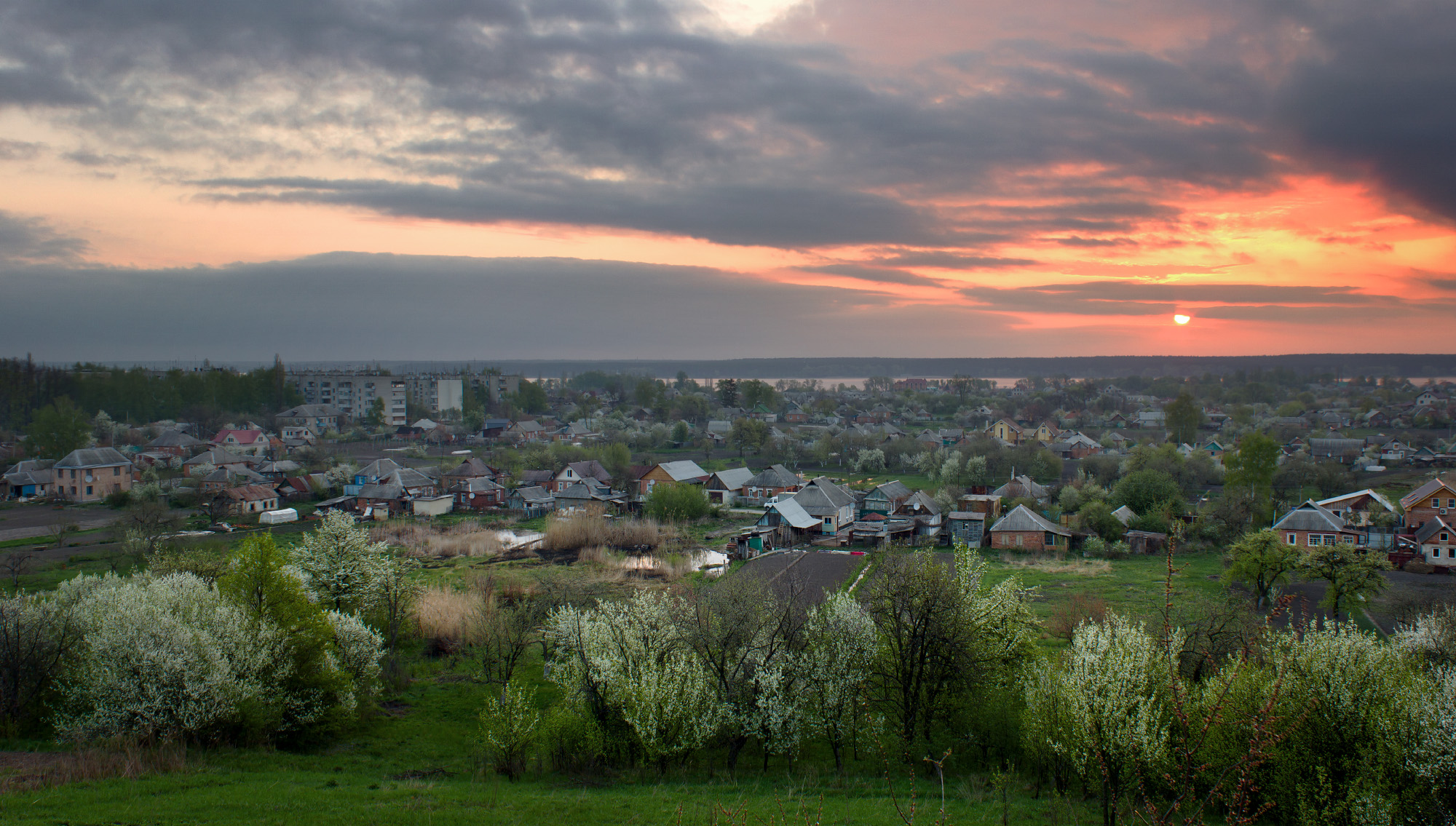

- Flag Coat of arms
- Interactive map of Staryi Saltiv
- Location in Kharkiv Oblast Location in Ukraine
- Coordinates: 50°04′41″N 36°47′43″E
- Country: Ukraine
- Oblast: Kharkiv Oblast
- Raion: Chuhuiv Raion

Population (2022)
  - Total: 3,329
- Time zone: UTC+2 (EET)
  - Summer (DST): UTC+3 (EEST)

Staryi Saltiv (Ukrainian: Старий Салтів, Russian: Старый Салтов) is a rural settlement in Chuhuiv Raion of Kharkiv Oblast in Ukraine. It is located on the right bank of the Donets, which is dammed here as Pechenyhi Reservoir. Staryi Saltiv hosts the administration of Staryi Saltiv settlement hromada, one of the hromadas of Ukraine. Population: 3,329 (2022 estimate).

The name of the village is eponymously derived from the folklore word of Turkic origin "saltan", aka "sultan" in English. Most likely there was a proto-city here founded in the Middle Ages under the Khazar Kaghanate.

== History ==
The town of Saltiv was first mentioned as an old settlement in the Book of the Great Drawing in 1627, and in 1639 it was inhabited by the Cossacks of Hetman Yakov Ostryanytsia. With their departure in 1641, Saltiv is again mentioned as a settlement on the high right bank of the Seversky Donets River and only in 1650 Chuhuiv villagers began to serve here. In 1652, a royal decree settled 19 boyar children.

In 1660, a new wooden fort was built on the old settlement and the old stone foundations of the ancient Khazar fortress.

According to data for 1864 in the state settlement, the center of Starosaltivska volost of Vovchansky district, 2544 people lived (1254 males and 1290 females), there were 448 households, there was an Orthodox church, distillery and brick factories, 4 annual fairs.

As of 1914, the population had grown to 6,538.

The village suffered as a result of the Holodomor of the Ukrainian people, carried out by the USSR government in 1932–1933. The number of identified victims was 219 people.

Until 18 July 2020, Staryi Saltiv belonged to Vovchansk Raion. The raion was abolished in July 2020 as part of the administrative reform of Ukraine, which reduced the number of raions of Kharkiv Oblast to seven. The area of Vovchansk Raion was merged into Chuhuiv Raion.

In the 2022 Russian invasion of Ukraine, Saltiv was occupied by Russian forces early in the invasion, and became the scene of renewed fighting in the Battle of Kharkiv (2022). On 2 May 2022, an American defense official corroborated Ukrainian defense officials that Staryi Saltiv was retaken by the Ukrainian Armed Forces.

Until 26 January 2024, Staryi Saltiv was designated as an urban-type settlement. On this day, a new law entered into force which abolished this status, and Staryi Saltiv became a rural settlement.

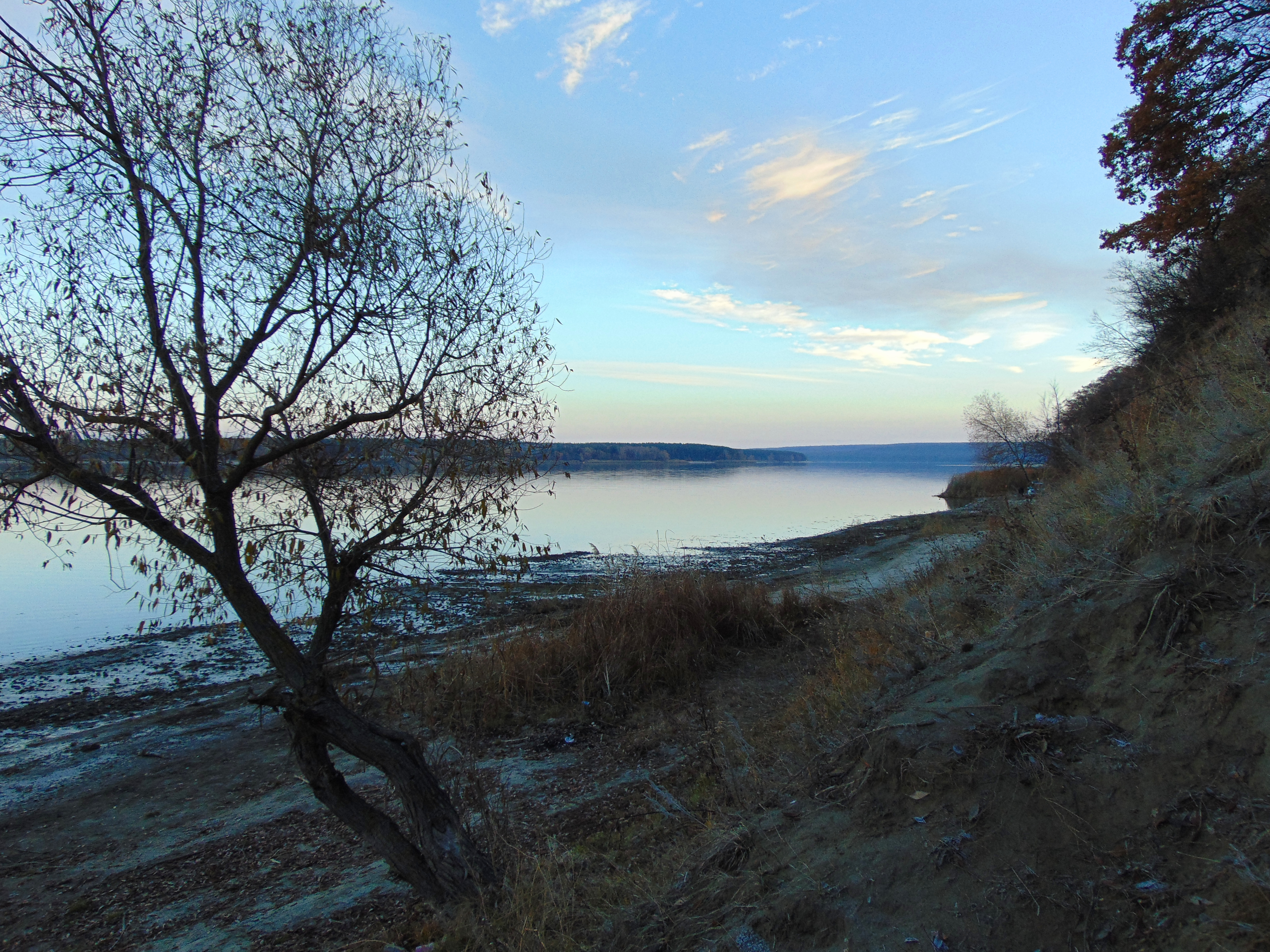
Pechenyhi Reservoir

== Economy ==
=== Transportation ===
The settlement is connected by roads with Kharkiv and with Vovchansk.
