= Prykolotne =

Rural locality in Kharkiv Oblast, Ukraine

Prykolotne Приколотне
- Rural settlement
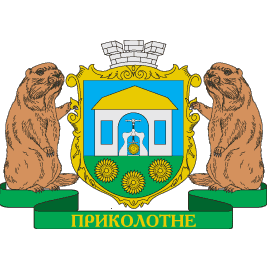
- Seal

- Location in Kharkiv Oblast Location in Ukraine
- Coordinates: 50°09′35″N 37°20′48″E
- Country: Ukraine
- Oblast: Kharkiv Oblast
- Raion: Kupiansk Raion
- Hromada: Vilkhuvatka rural hromada

Population (2022)
  - Total: 1,928
  - Estimate (25.07.2026): 100
- Time zone: UTC+2 (EET)
  - Summer (DST): UTC+3 (EEST)

Prykolotne (Ukrainian: Приколотне, Russian: Приколотное) is a rural settlement in Kupiansk Raion of Kharkiv Oblast in Ukraine. It is located in the northeast of the oblast, at the source of the Khotomlia, a left tributary of the Donets in the drainage basin of the Don. Prykolotne belongs to Vilkhuvatka rural hromada, one of the hromadas of Ukraine. Population: 1,928 (2022 estimate).

== Geography ==
The village of Prykolotne is located at one of the sources of the Khotimlya river, at the intersection of the highways T-2104 and Autoroute T-2115. There is a railway station Prykolotne in the village. The distance to the Velykyi Burluk is almost 17 km and is passed by the highway T-2115. A forest massive (oak) adjoins the village. The Prykolotnyanske reservoir is located near the village, and downstream is the former village of Vilne.

== History ==
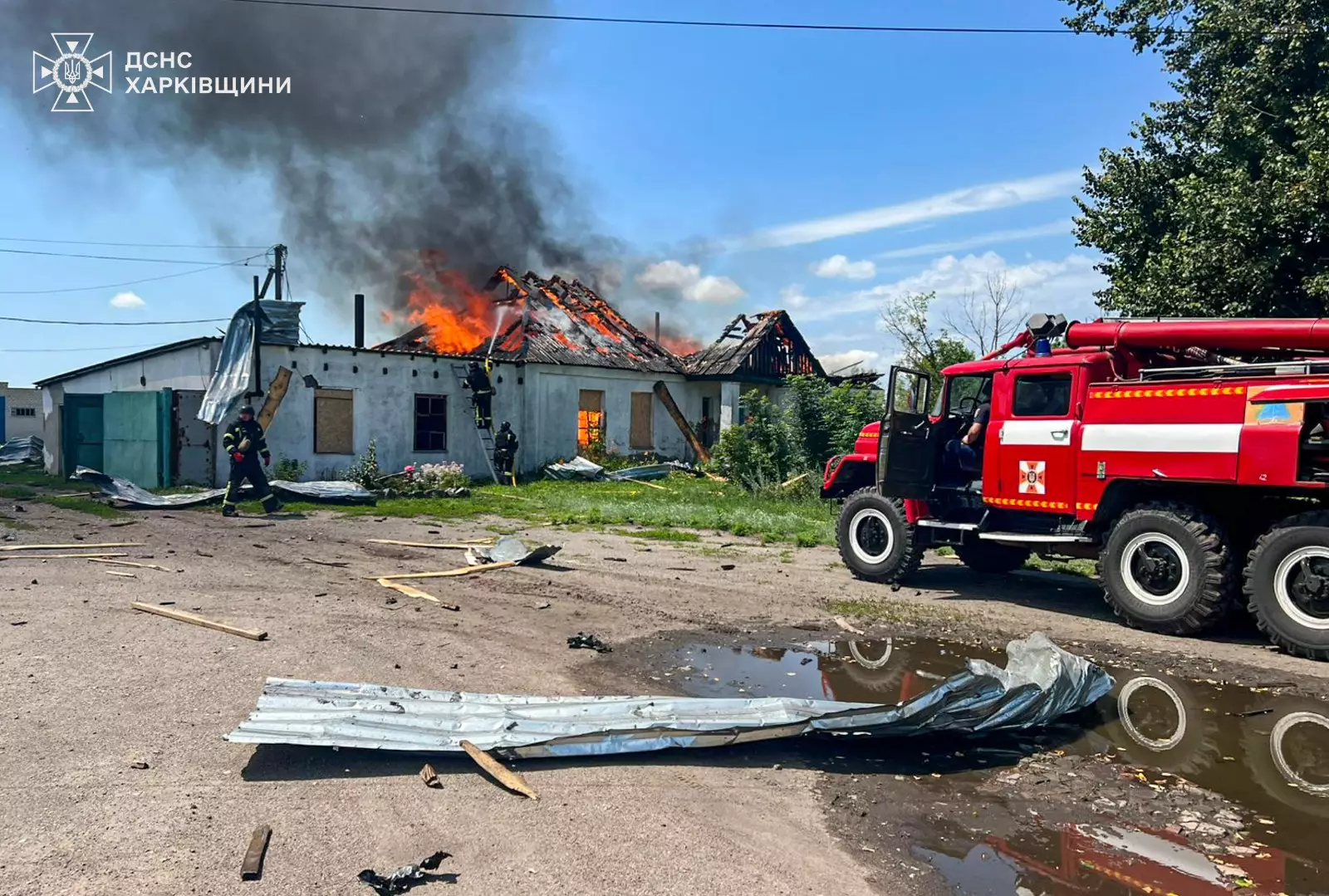
Destruction in the village after Russian attack, July 2025

The Prikolotnoye farmstead was founded in 1864. In 1898, the Zadonskaya station on the Belgorod-Kupyansk railway line was opened in the Kharkov Governorate of the Russian Empire. In 1901, the Zadonskaya railway station was renamed Prikolotnoye, after the growing farmstead. In 1907, an oil mill and grain storage facility were established here, and in 1911, a brick factory was opened.

During World War II, from late October 1941 to August 1943, the village was under German occupation. In 1957, its status was changed to an urban-type settlement. In 1966, the population was 3,600; it had a secondary school, a club, two libraries, and the Progress collective farm (third division) with 1,870 hectares of agricultural land. In 1975, the Prikolotnyansky oil extraction plant and a building materials plant were operating here. In January 1989, the population was 2,796 people (1,201 men and 1,595 women).

In May 1995, the Cabinet of Ministers of Ukraine approved the decision to privatize the oil extraction plant located here. In May 2003, the State Property Fund of Ukraine put up for sale and in October 2003 sold for 52,976 hryvnia the clubhouse of the Prikolotnyansky oil extraction plant located in the village.

As of January 1, 2013, the population was 2,118 people. Until 18 July 2020, Prykolotne belonged to Velykyi Burluk Raion. The raion was abolished in July 2020 as part of the administrative reform of Ukraine, which reduced the number of raions of Kharkiv Oblast to seven. The area of Velykyi Burluk Raion was merged into Kupiansk Raion. Also, Prykolotne was the administrative center of the Prykolotne Village Council (Velykoburluk District), which also included the village of Gogino.

On February 25, 2022, it was completely captured by Russian forces. On September 13, 2022, it was occupied by the Ukrainian Armed Forces. Until 26 January 2024, Prykolotne was designated urban-type settlement. On this day, a new law entered into force which abolished this status, and Prykolotne became a rural settlement.

== Social sphere ==
- School
- Prikolotnyansky General Practice Clinic
- Sports Ground
- Church of Onuphrius the Great

== Economy ==
- Prykolotnyansky Oil Extraction Plant
- Stozhar Plant
- Dairy farm
- Machine and tractor workshops

=== Transportation ===
Prykolotne railway station is on the railway connecting Vovchansk and Kupiansk. There is infrequent passenger traffic. The settlement has road connections with Vovchansk via Bilyi Kolodiaz and with Kupiansk and Chuhuiv via Velykyi Burluk.
