= Vovchansk Aggregate Plant =

Construction aggregate plant in Vovchansk, Ukraine

Vovchansk Aggregate Plant Вовчанський агрегатний завод
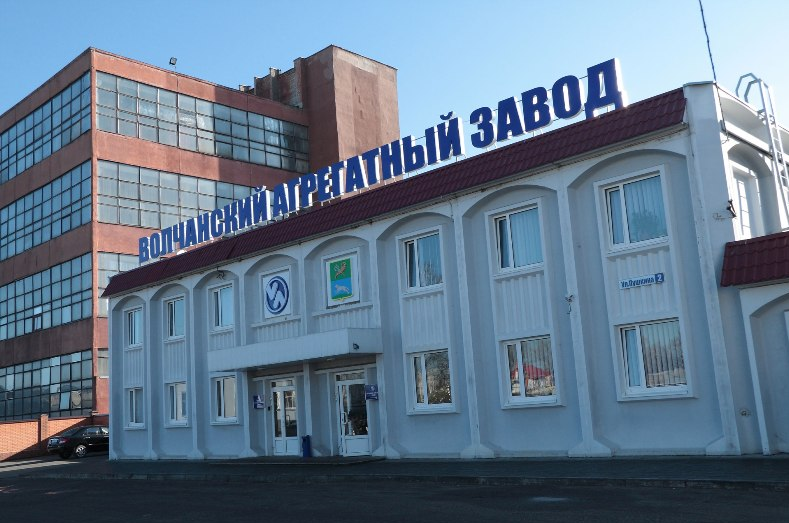

- Location of the plant in Kharkiv Oblast Location of the plant in Ukraine
- Built: 1970
- Location: 2 Pushkin St., Vovchansk, Ukraine; Vovchansk, Kharkiv Oblast, Ukraine
- Coordinates: 50.3006958°N 36.9219556°E
- Products: Aircraft engines, Automotives Part, Pump
- Employees: 821
- Website: https://vza.com.ua/

The Vovchansk Aggregate Plant (Ukrainian: Вовчанський агрегатний завод) was a production plant based in the Ukrainian city of Vovchansk in Kharkiv Oblast, that mainly produced hydraulic machinery.

== History ==
=== Soviet ownership ===
In 1970, this plant began operation after it was constructed as part of the Soviet's 8th 5-Year-Plan. The plant's main products were pumping stations and hydraulic motors for aircraft.

The plant began expanding its production capabilities by the mid-1970s, and began manufacturing parts relating to natural gas. The city of Vovchansk soon began to receive gas supplies from nearby Shebekino. In addition, the company also helped build many residential buildings and other infrastructure within the city.

=== Privatization ===
After Ukrainian independence, the plant temporarily became part of the state-owned FED Plant. The company became privatized in 1995, and became a public joint-stock company.

In August 1997, the plant became part of the list of strategically important companies from the Ukrainian government. The company began receiving state subsidy in 2010, and began manufacturing military products by 2013. In 2021, the plant was given the green light for export of its military production.

On November 23, 2020, in honor of the 50th anniversary of its founding, the company released an anniversary package "VAZ - 50 years!", which includes the No. 147 issue of the plant's own newspaper, and also a book celebrating this anniversary.

=== Russo-Ukrainian War ===
During the initial Russian occupation of Vovchansk in 2022, the plant was used as a prison. Local residents claimed that relatives of Ukrainian troops and pro-Ukrainian activists were held and tortured at the plant.

In June 2024, during the Russian Kharkiv offensive, the Armed Forces of Ukraine successfully stopped the Russian forces at this plant. Ukraine retook full control of the facility on 24 September, capturing 20 Russian soldiers and killing at least four others. Russian forces recaptured the plant on 7 October.

== Industries ==
During the 1990s, the plant began to produce fuel system units for aircraft engines, such as gas turbines. It also produeced units for automotives such as hydraulic clutch boosters. It also produced brake systems by 2003.

In 2013, the plant mastered the production of clutch master cylinders for MAZ trucks and KAMAZ vehicles. By January 2014, the plant began to deliver them to Kamaz and Minsk Tractor Works.

In March 2014, the aggregate plant completed a joint development with Antonov for the electromagnetic brake of the An-178 aircraft.

== Economic standing ==
Year	Economic performance (Hryvnia)
2005	▼1.82 million
2007	▲8.16 million
2008	▲6.59 million
2009	▲22.29 million
2010	▲11.2 million
2011	▲35 million
