= Vovchansk Raion =

Former subdivision of Kharkiv Oblast, Ukraine

Vovchansk Raion Вовчанський район
- Raion
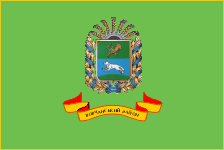
- Flag

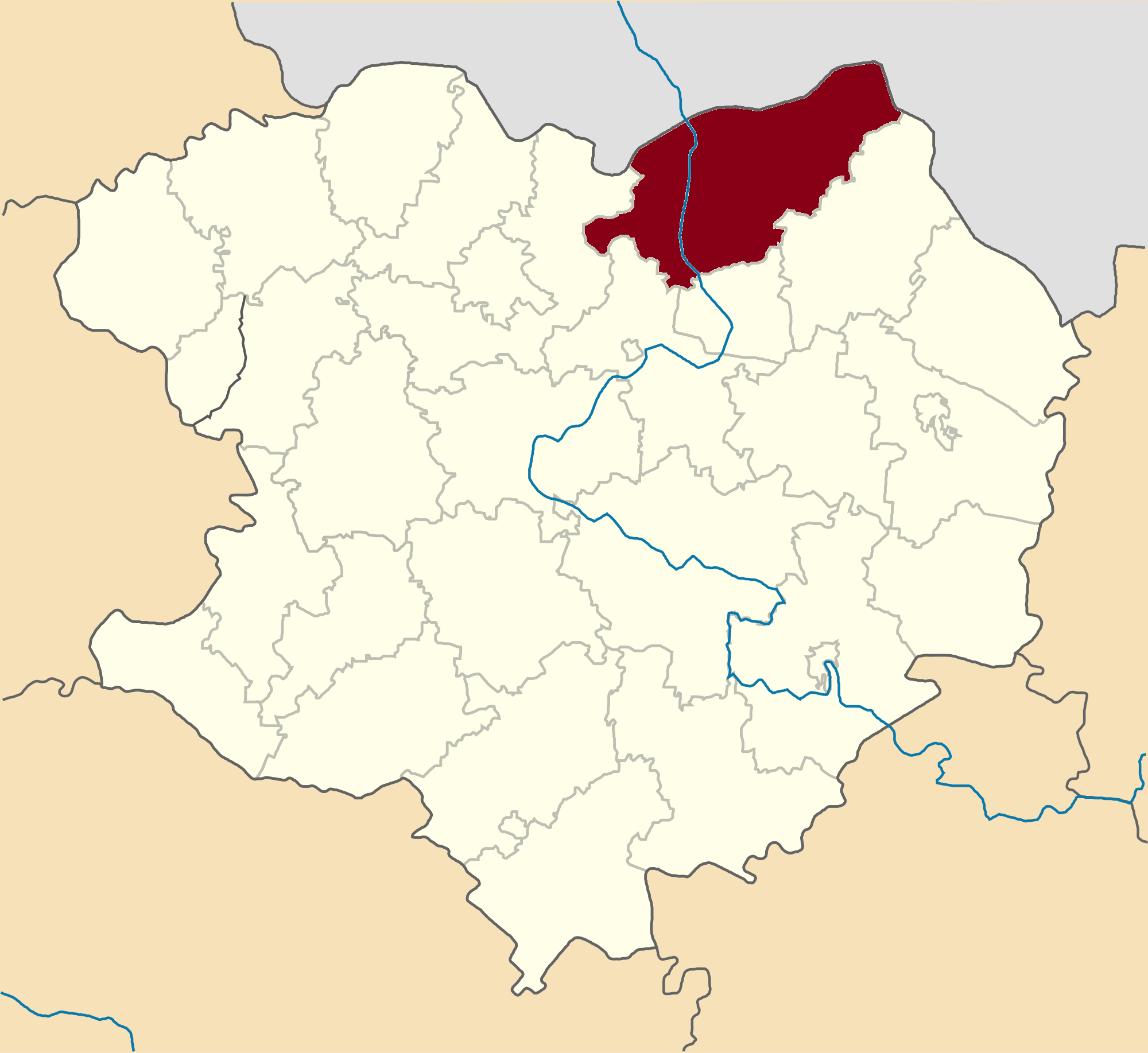
- Raion location in Kharkiv Oblast
- Coordinates: 50°12′7.8978″N 37°2′24.5502″E
- Country: Ukraine
- Oblast: Kharkiv Oblast
- Disestablished: 18 July 2020
- Admin. center: Vovchansk

Area
  - Total: 1,888.1 km^{2} (729.0 sq mi)

Population (2020)
  - Total: 44,448
  - Density: 23.541/km^{2} (60.971/sq mi)
- Time zone: UTC+2 (EET)
  - Summer (DST): UTC+3 (EEST)
- Website: http://vovchrayrada.kh.ua/

Vovchansk Raion (Ukrainian: Вовчанський район) was a raion (district) in Kharkiv Oblast of Ukraine. Its administrative center was the town of Vovchansk. The raion was abolished on 18 July 2020 as part of the administrative reform of Ukraine, which reduced the number of raions of Kharkiv Oblast to seven. The area of Vovchansk Raion was, together with Pechenihy and Zmiiv Raions, merged into Chuhuiv Raion. The last estimate of the raion population was 44,448 (2020 est.)

At the time of disestablishment, the raion consisted of two hromada:

- Staryi Saltiv settlement hromada with the administration in the urban-type settlement of Staryi Saltiv;
- Vovchansk urban hromada with the administration in Vovchansk.

== Geography ==
Cities

- Vovchansk

Urban-type settlements

- Bilyi Kolodiaz
- Staryi Saltiv
- Vilcha
