= Olshanske =

Rural locality in Mykolaiv Oblast, Ukraine

Olshanske Ольшанське
- Rural settlement
- Location within Mykolaiv Oblast Location within Ukraine
- Coordinates: 47°10′7″N 31°45′9″E
- Country: Ukraine
- Oblast: Mykolaiv Oblast
- Raion: Mykolaiv Raion

Population (2022)
  - Total: 3,582
- Time zone: UTC+2 (EET)
  - Summer (DST): UTC+3 (EEST)

Olshanske (Ukrainian: Ольшанське, Russian: Ольшанское) is a rural settlement in Mykolaiv Raion, Mykolaiv Oblast, Ukraine. It hosts the administration of Olshanske settlement hromada, one of the hromadas of Ukraine. Population: 3,582 (2022 estimate).

The settlement is located on the right bank of the Southern Bug, about 3 kilometres (1.9 mi) from the river.

== History ==
In 1961, a construction of a big cement plant started. The settlement serving the plant was known as the Hryhorievka Cement Plant and belonged to Varvarivka Raion of Mykolaiv Oblast. In 1963, Varvarivka Raion was abolished and Mykolaiv Raion was established. In 1968, Hryhorievka Cement Plant was renamed Olshanske, to commemorate Konstantin Olshansky, a Hero of the Soviet Union, and it was granted urban-type settlement status. On 26 January 2024, a new law entered into force which abolished the status of urban-type settlement status, and Olshanske became a rural settlement.

== Economy ==
Olshanske is home to a cement plant historically operated by Dyckerhoff AG. In 2024, the plant became part of CRH Ukraine B.V., a subsidiary of Irish building materials group CRH plc, following its acquisition of Dyckerhoff Cement Ukraine. The deal was approved by Ukraine’s Antimonopoly Committee, with a required minority stake (25–28%) expected to be transferred to the European Bank for Reconstruction and Development (EBRD). In April 2025, a Ukrainian court annulled the regulatory approval, though CRH continues to operate the plant pending appeal.

== Transportation ==
Olshanske is served by a railway station on the line connecting Mykolaiv and Tokarivka, with further links to Odesa and Voznesensk. This rail line is crucial for passenger services and for transporting materials and cement produced locally. The settlement is also connected by regional roads to neighboring towns and villages.
