= Edward Balcerzan =

Polish critic, writer, and translator (born 1937)

Edward Balcerzan (born 13 October 1937) is a Polish literary critic, poet, prose writer, and translator. He was born in Vovchansk, Kharkiv Oblast, present-day Ukraine.

== Awards ==
- 1971 – nagroda czasopisma "Odra" za książkę Oprócz głosu. Szkice krytycznoliterackie. PIW, Warszawa 1971
- 1989 – nagroda Fundacji Literatury za książkę Poezja polska w latach 1939–1965, cz. II: Ideologie artystyczne. WSiP, Warszawa 1988
- 1992 — nagroda Fundacji A. Jurzykowskiego w Nowym Jorku w dziedzinie teorii literatury za Przygody człowieka książkowego. (Ogólne i szczególne). PEN, Warszawa 1990
- 1998 – nagroda Polskiego PEN Clubu za Śmiech pokoleń – płacz pokoleń. Universitas, Kraków 1997
- 1998 – nagroda "Literatury na Świecie" za książkę Literatura z literatury (strategie tłumaczy). Studia o przekładzie pod red. Piotra Fasta, Nr 6. "Śląsk", Katowice 1998.

== Poetry ==
- 1960 – Morze, pergamin i ty
- 1964 – Podwójne interlinie
- 1969 – Granica na moment. Wiersze, przekłady, pastisze
- 1972 – Późny wiek. Poezje.

== Prose ==
- 1964 – Pobyt
- 1972 – Któż by nas takich pięknych. Tryptyk
- 2003 – Perehenia i słoneczniki (opisuje ukraińsko-polskie dzieciństwo autora).

== Scholarship ==
- 1968 – Styl i poetyka twórczości dwujęzycznej Brunona Jasieńskiego. Z zagadnień teorii przekładu
- 1971 – Oprócz głosu. Szkice krytycznoliterackie
- 1972 – Przez znaki. Granice autonomii sztuki poetyckiej. Na materiale polskiej poezji współczesnej
- 1977 – (editor) Pisarze polscy o sztuce przekładu, 1440–1974: Antologia (Polish Writers on the Art of Translation, 1440–1974: an Anthology)
- 1982 – Kręgi wtajemniczenia. Czytelnik, badacz, tłumacz, pisarz
- 1982 – Poezja polska w latach 1939–1965. Część 1. Strategie liryczne
- 1988 – Poezja polska w latach 1939–1965. Część 2. Ideologie artystyczne
- 1984 – Włodzimierz Majakowski (monografia)
- 1989 – Liryka Juliana Przybosia
- 1990 – Przygody człowieka książkowego. (Ogólne i szczególne)
- 1990 – Poezja polska w latach 1918–1939
- 1997 – Śmiech pokoleń – płacz pokoleń
- 1998 – Poezja polska w latach 1939–1968
- 1998 – Literatura z literatury (strategie tłumaczy) ("Studia o przekładzie", t. 6)
- 2004 – O nowatorstwie ("Wykłady Schopenhauerowskie", wykład I)
- 2005 – Zuchwalstwa samoświadomości.

== See also ==
- List of Poles
- Translation
