= Volchya Alexandrovka =

Volchya Alexandrovka Волчья Александровка
- Selo
- Location within Belgorod Oblast Location within Russia
- Coordinates: 50°29′N 37°34′E
- Country: Russia
- Region: Belgorod Oblast
- District: Volokonovsky District
- Time zone: UTC+3:00

Volchya Alexandrovka (Russian: Волчья Александровка) is a rural locality (a selo) and the administrative center of Volchye-Alexandrovskoye Rural Settlement, Volokonovsky District, Belgorod Oblast, Russia. The population was 896 as of 2010. There are 9 streets.

== Geography ==
Volchya Alexandrovka is located 24 km west of Volokonovka (the district's administrative centre) by road. Volchy-Vtoroy is the nearest rural locality.
