= Vovcha (Donets) =

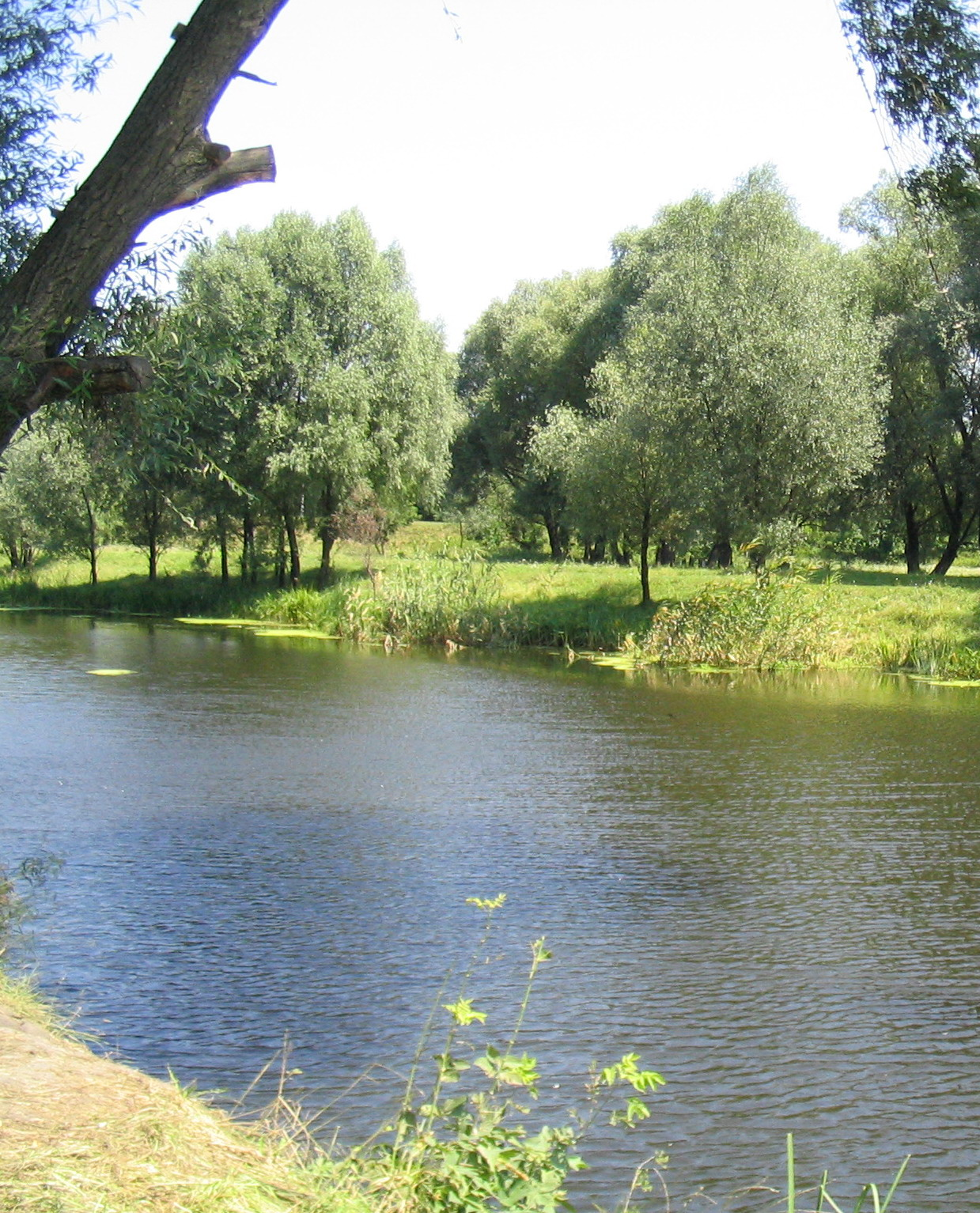
- Native name: Вовча (Ukrainian)

Location
- Country: Russia, Ukraine
- Region: Belgorod Oblast, Kharkiv Oblast

Physical characteristics
- Source
  - location: near Volchya Alexandrovka
  - coordinates: 50°31′3″N 37°37′8″E
- Mouth: Donets
  - coordinates: 50°17′11″N 36°51′18″E
- Length: 88 km (55 mi)
- Basin size: 1,340 km^{2} (520 sq mi)

Basin features
- Progression: Donets→ Don→ Sea of Azov

The Vovcha (Ukrainian: Вовча; Russian: Волчья) is an 88-kilometre (55 mi) long river in the Belgorod Oblast of Russia and Kharkiv Oblast in Ukraine. It is a left tributary of the Donets river.

Its source is in Belgorod Oblast, near the Russian-Ukrainian border, near the village of Volchya Alexandrovka. It flows in a predominantly westerly direction. The confluence with the Donets is near the city of Vovchansk.
