= Vovchansk =

City in Kharkiv Oblast, Ukraine

Vovchansk Вовчанськ
- City
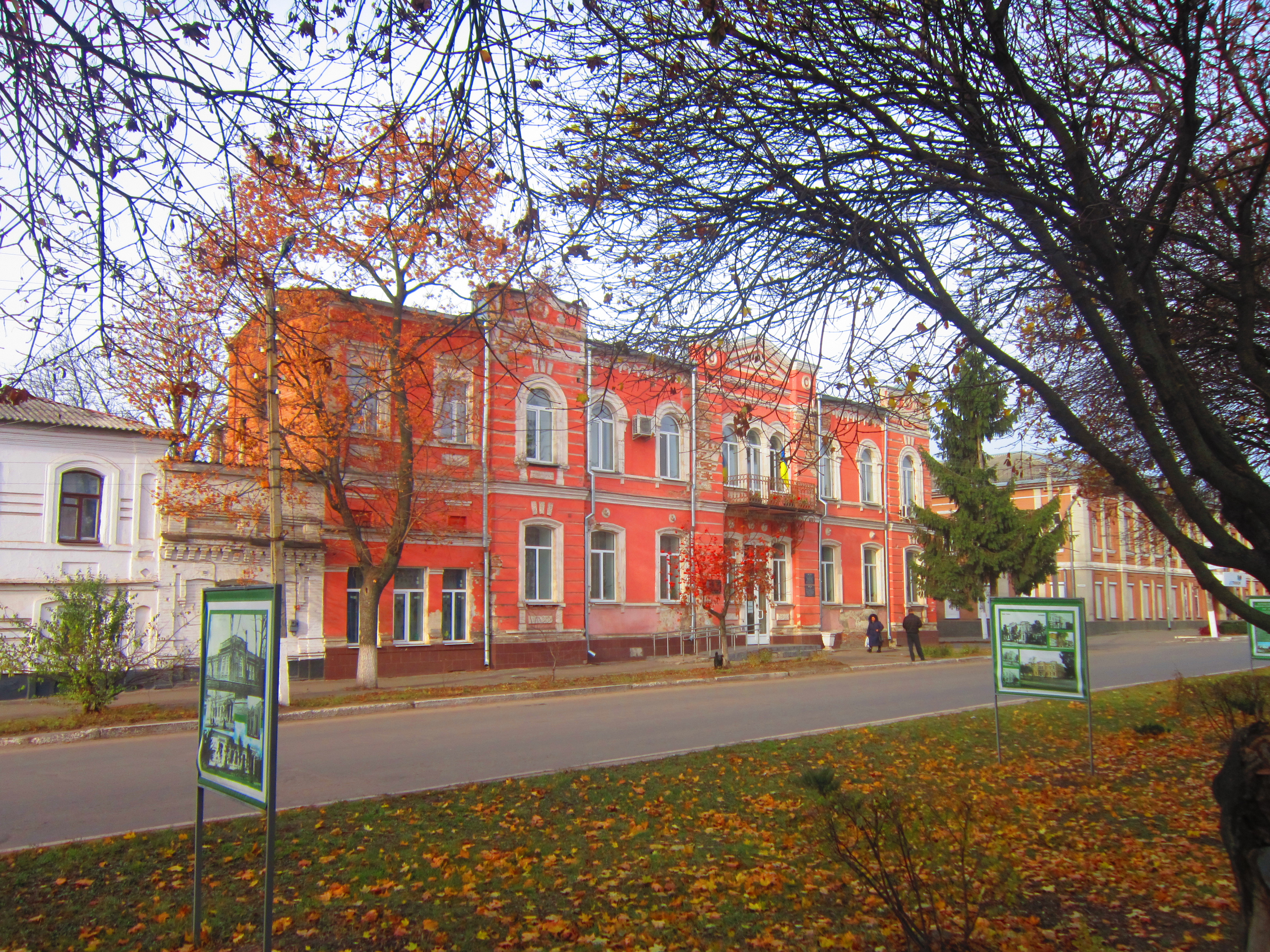
- Historic administration building

- Flag Coat of arms
- Interactive map of Vovchansk
- Location of Vovchansk in Ukraine Vovchansk (Ukraine)
- Coordinates: 50°17′16″N 36°56′34″E
- Country: Ukraine
- Oblast: Kharkiv Oblast
- Raion: Chuhuiv Raion
- Hromada: Vovchansk urban hromada
- Founded: 1674

Government
  - Civil-military administration head: Tamaz Gambarashvili

Area
  - Total: 70.3 km^{2} (27.1 sq mi)

Population (2022)
  - Total: 17,459
  - Density: 248/km^{2} (643/sq mi)
- Time zone: UTC+2 (EET)
  - Summer (DST): UTC+3 (EEST)
- Postal code: 62500-62507
- Area code: +380 5741

Vovchansk (Ukrainian: Вовчанськ, pronounced [wou̯ˈtʃɑnʲsʲk]; Russian: Волчанск, romanized: Volchansk) is a depopulated and destroyed city in Chuhuiv Raion, Kharkiv Oblast, northeastern Ukraine. It hosts the administration of Vovchansk urban hromada. The Vovcha river, a tributary of the Donets river, runs through the city. It is located in the historic region of Sloboda Ukraine.

Vovchansk had a population of 17,459 (2022 estimate). However, that dropped to about 300 by May 2024, as the city was largely destroyed during the Russo-Ukrainian War's 2024 Kharkiv offensive. As of 2025, there are no inhabitants in the city.

== History ==
Vovchansk was first settled in 1674 under the Tsardom of Russia, when a territory of Belgorod Monastery was provided to Ukrainian migrants from Dnieper Ukraine led by Martyn Starochudny. The settlement was named as Vovche and designated as a guarding settlement.

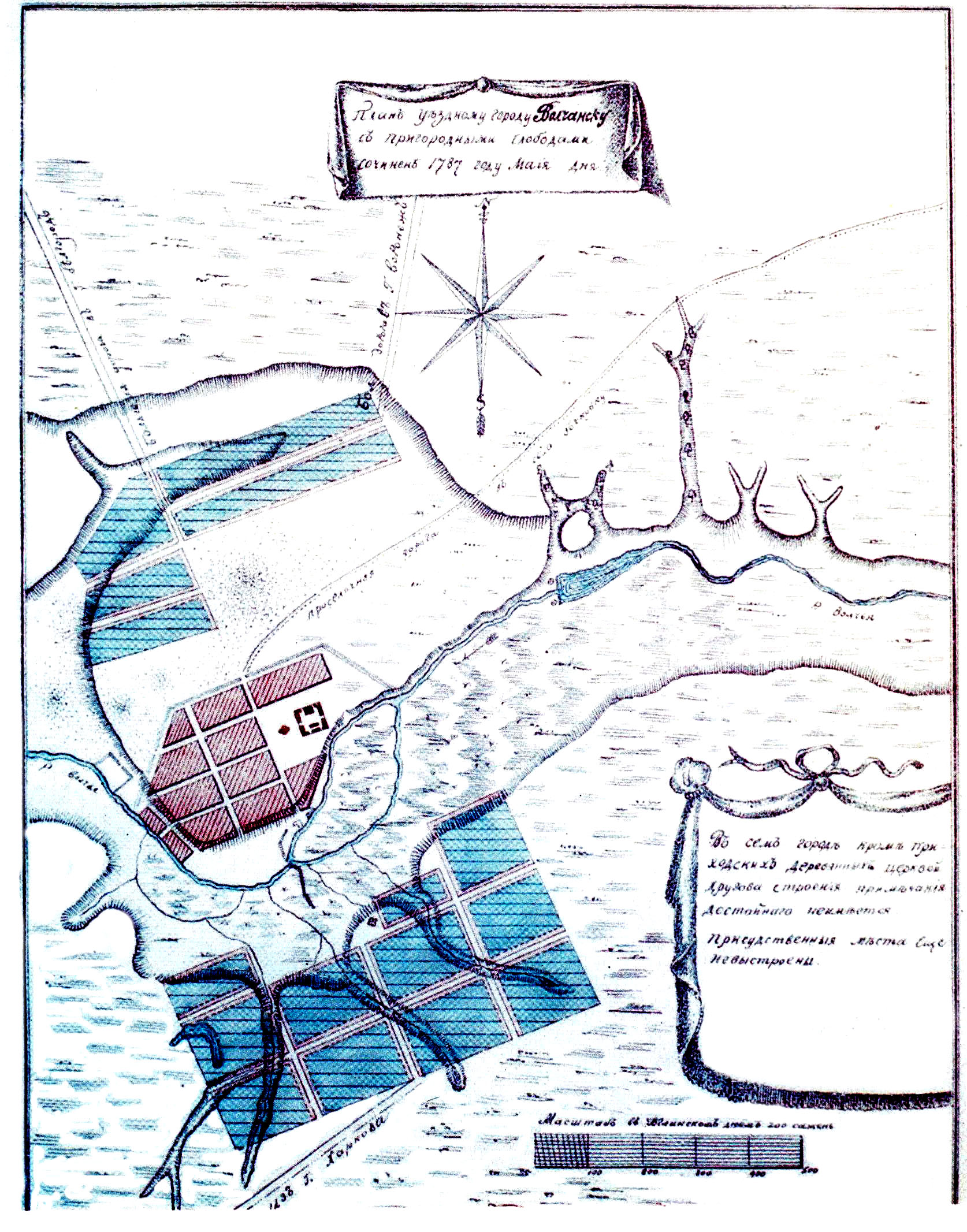
Map of Vovchansk in 1787

In April 1780, it was officially renamed to "Volchansk", and became an administrative centre of Volchansk uyezd in the Kharkov Governorate of the Russian Empire. The year 1780 is considered by the Verkhovna Rada as the official year of the city establishment. In the 18th century its military significance declined, and in 1780 it was granted city status.

In 1896, a Belgorod – Donbas railroad was installed through the town. Moreover, a local newspaper has been published here since February 1918.

During the Ukrainian War of Independence, from 1917 to 1920, it passed between various factions. It became a part of the Donets-Krivoy Rog Soviet Republic, although in spring 1918 it was occupied by German troops, and passed to the Ukrainian State. This lasted until November 1918. Later on, it was administratively part of the Kharkiv Governorate of Ukraine.

On 12 April 1923, an administrative-territorial reform was carried out in the Ukrainian SSR. Vovchansk district was divided into 8 districts: Bilyi Kolodiaz, Velytkyi Burluk, Vovchansk, Zhovtneve, Pechenihy, Rubizhne, Khotimlia, and Shypuvate. As of January 1, 1924, the population of Vovchansk district was 27,329 people. The town suffered as a result of the genocide of the Ukrainian people committed by the USSR government in 1932-1933; the number of identified victims in Vovchansk, Zavody Pershi, Zavody Druhi, Chapliivka, and Herhelivka was 1,789 people.

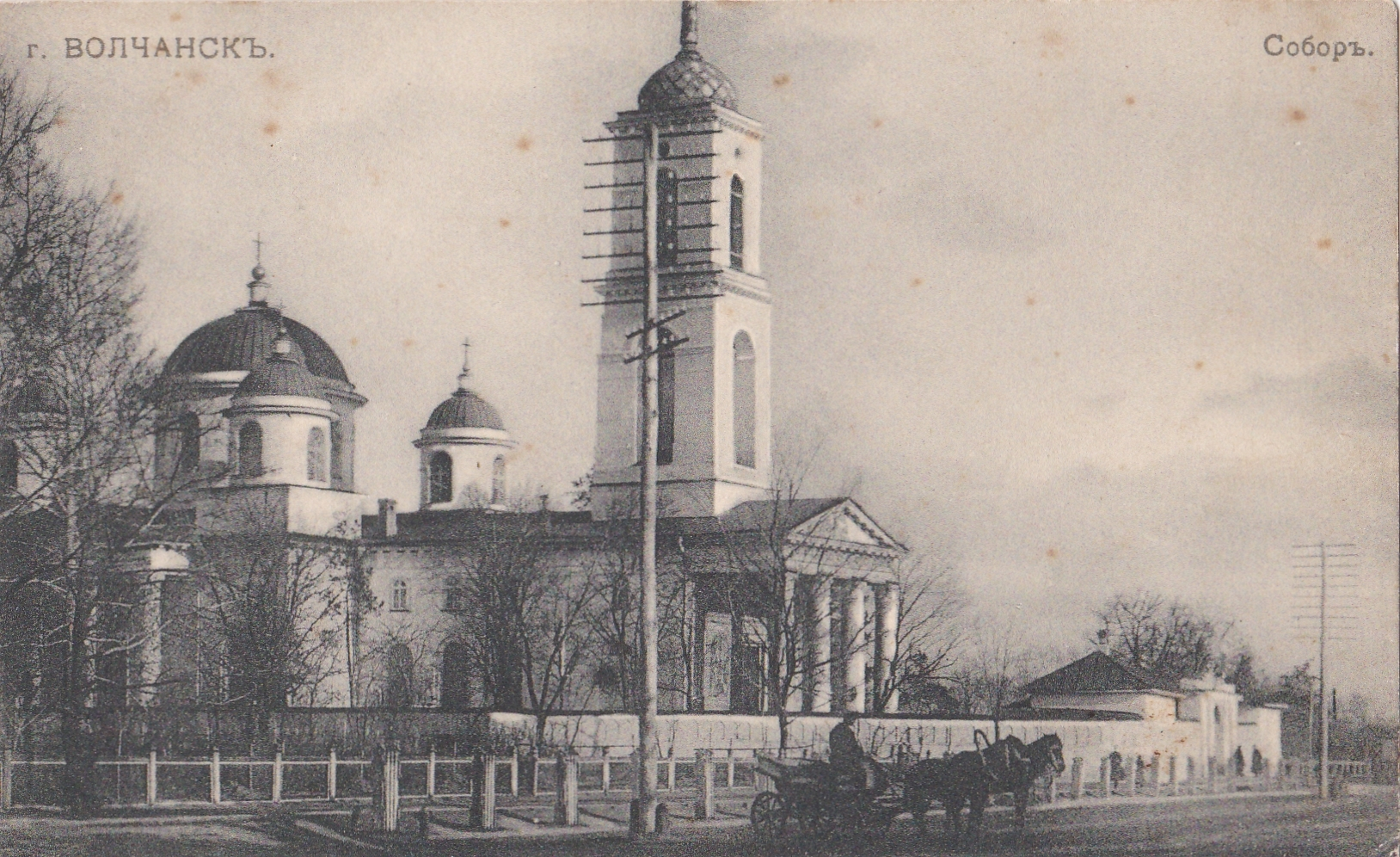
Cathedral of the Holy Trinity, which was detonated in 1937 with the direct participation of Pavel Postyshev

During World War II, Vovchansk was occupied by the Wehrmacht on June 10, 1942, in the aftermath of the German victory at the Second Battle of Kharkov. The Germans operated the AGSSt 5 assembly center for prisoners of war and then the Dulag 231 transit camp in the city. It was recaptured by the Red Army in August 1943 during the Fourth Battle of Kharkov.

In 1964, the construction of two reinforced concrete bridges over the Vovcha River on Lenin and Gagarin streets was completed and the district House of Culture was built. In 1966, the city's population amounted to 20,600 people. In 1979, Vovchansk had a carriage factory, a building materials factory, an asphalt plant, an oil extraction plant, a bread factory, a butter factory, a shoe factory, a cotton factory, a furniture factory, a meat processing plant, a bakery, and a district agricultural machinery, a consumer services plant, a medical school, an aviation school, a technical school of agricultural mechanization, three medical institutions, a House of Culture, six clubs, a cinema, and 14 libraries.

The economic crisis that began in 2008 hit the local industry. A dairy factory that was built here during the time of the Soviet Union stopped work, and by December 2009, it ceased to exist.

The raion was abolished in July 2020 as part of the administrative reform of Ukraine, which reduced the number of raions of Kharkiv Oblast to seven. The area of Vovchansk Raion was merged into Chuhuiv Raion.

Until 18 July 2020, Vovchansk was the administrative center of Vovchansk Raion.

=== Russo-Ukrainian War ===
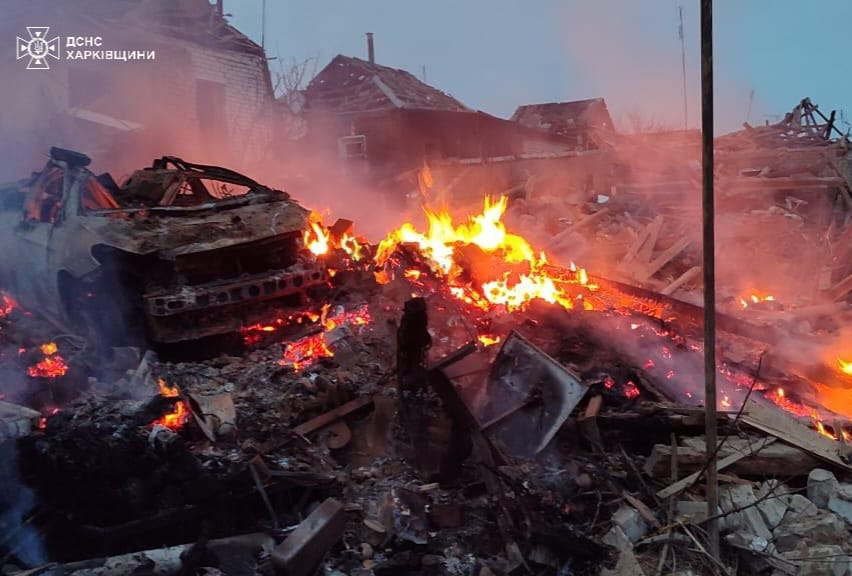
Damage to Vovchansk after Russian strikes with air-dropped bombs on 17 March 2024

Vovchansk was occupied by the Russian military on 24 February 2022, the first day of the 2022 Russian invasion of Ukraine. It was retaken by Ukrainian forces on 10 September 2022 as part of a major counteroffensive in Kharkiv Oblast.

On 10 May 2024, Russian forces launched a new offensive near Vovchansk, with the speculated goal of establishing a buffer zone at least 10 kilometres from the Russian border, according to a Ukrainian military source. Vovchansk became a focal point of the offensive, with the city seeing heavily increased bombardment. On 12 May, Russian forces entered northern Vovchansk and established a foothold in the city by seizing the Vovchansk Meat Processing Plant, with unverified reports claiming that the Russians had also seized the local shoe factory by the morning of 13 May and penetrated as far as the northern bank of the Vovcha River by that same evening. Geolocated footage on May 14 confirmed that Russian forces were continuing to advance through the northwestern and northeastern parts of the city.

Ruins of the city in June 2024

On May 15, a speaker of the Ukrainian military stated that troops were withdrawn from the Lukiantsi and Vovchansk areas to "preserve the lives of our servicemen and avoid losses" and move to "more advantageous positions", and that the situation "remains difficult". By late May 2024, Vovchansk was largely destroyed. About 300 citizens remained there of a pre-war population of around 17,000.

On 5 December 2025, Russian Ministry of Defense reported that the city of Vovchansk was fully taken by Russian forces. The full control of the city by Russia is not entirely clear, however, most of the city's north has been captured and positions were fully consolidated by Russian forces.

On 25 December 2025, Viktor Trehubov, head of the Communications Department of the Joint Forces Grouping, released a statement that the Russian forces are present in large numbers in Vovchansk and control certain areas, but do not fully control all of it. The Ukrainian Defense Forces confirms this, with Russian control shown in most of the city's north, as well as southern parts of it on the Vovcha River's western bank. The settlements of Vilcha, Kharkiv Oblast and Synelnykove remain in the gray zone.

As of 28 December 2025, Vovchansk is largely destroyed, with Russian forces trying to fully consolidate their positions in the city.

As of 18 March 2026, Russian forces are confirmed to have captured around 70-75% of the city with few buildings left standing.

== Economy ==
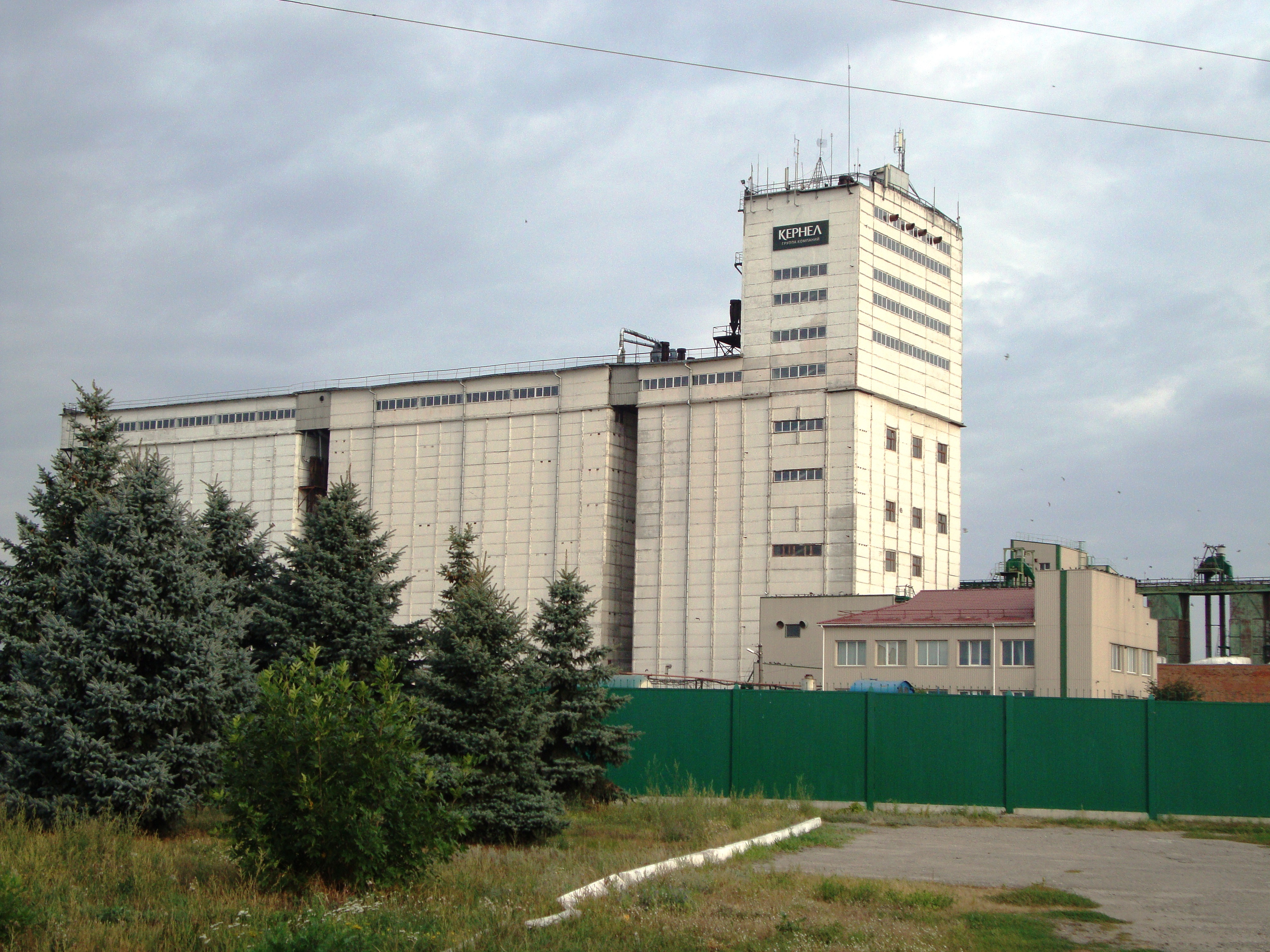
Sunflower oil refinery

Vovchansk was home to the Demurinsky Mining and Processing Plant, which was a mining and processing plant for the nearby titanium and zirconium deposit. The Vovchansk Aggregate Plant, which is specialising in hydraulic machinery is also located in town.

== Demographics ==
As of the 2001 Ukrainian census, the town had a population of 20,484 inhabitants. Over 80% of the population were Ukrainians, ethnic Russians were the second largest group, followed by Armenians. In terms of spoken languages, 82% of the city's inhabitants declared Ukrainian as their first language, while roughly 16% considered Russian as their native tongue. The exact ethnic and linguistic composition was:

Ethnic groups in Vovchansk
	percent
Ukrainians	83.12%
Russians	14.43%
Armenians	0.91%
Romani	0.60%
Belarusians	0.37%
others	0.12%

Native languages in Vovchansk
	percent
Ukrainian	82.8%
Russian	15.7%
Armenian	0.7%
Romani	0.5%
Belarusian	0.1%
others	0.6%

== Notable people ==
- Alexandra Snezhko-Blotskaya (21 February 1909 – 29 December 1980), animated films director
- Orest Somov (21 December 1793 – 8 June 1833), writer of gothic fiction
- Edward Balcerzan (born 1937), Polish literary critic and poet
- Artem Pyvovarov (born 1991), new wave singer and composer

== Gallery ==
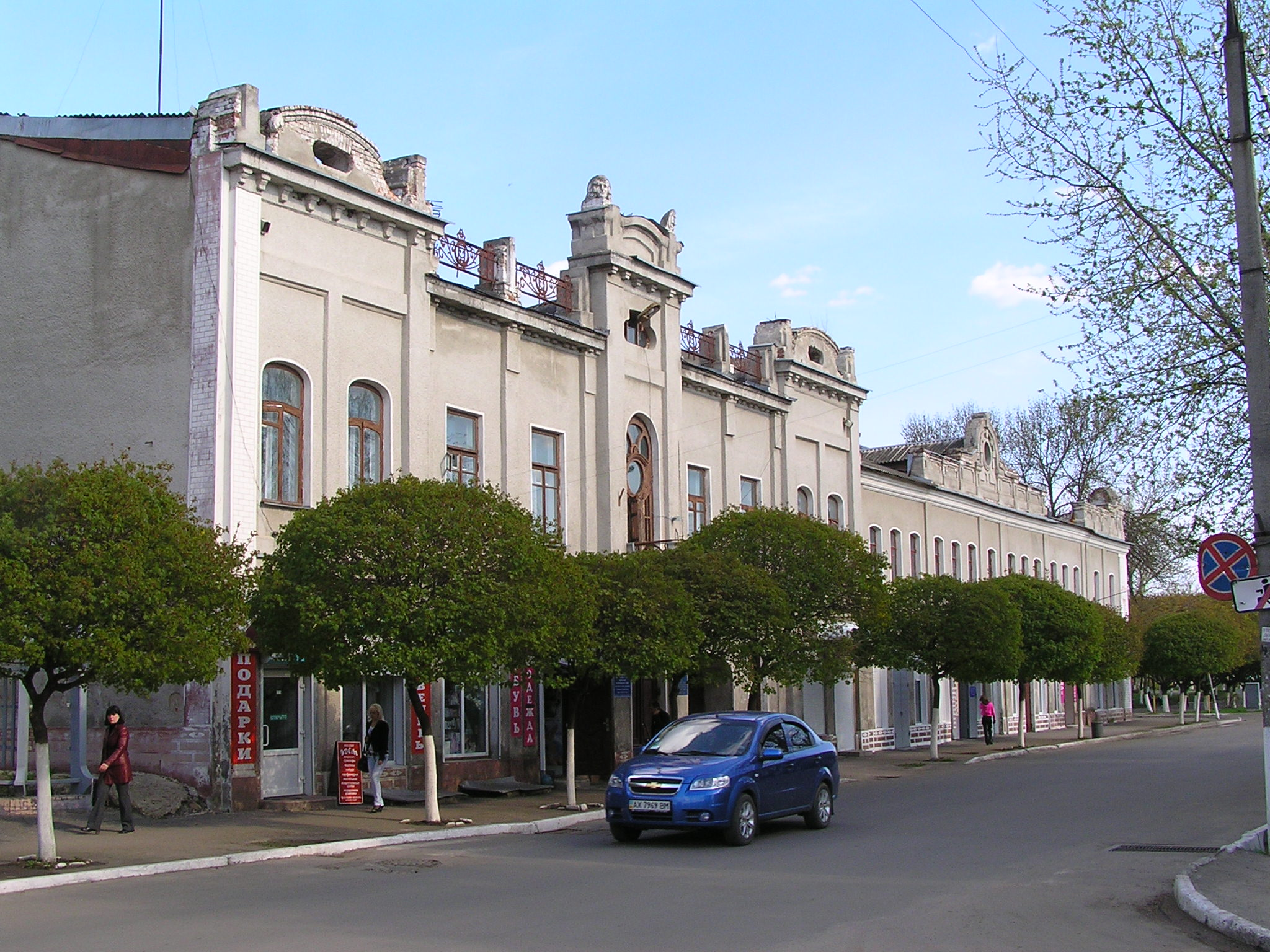
Soborna Street

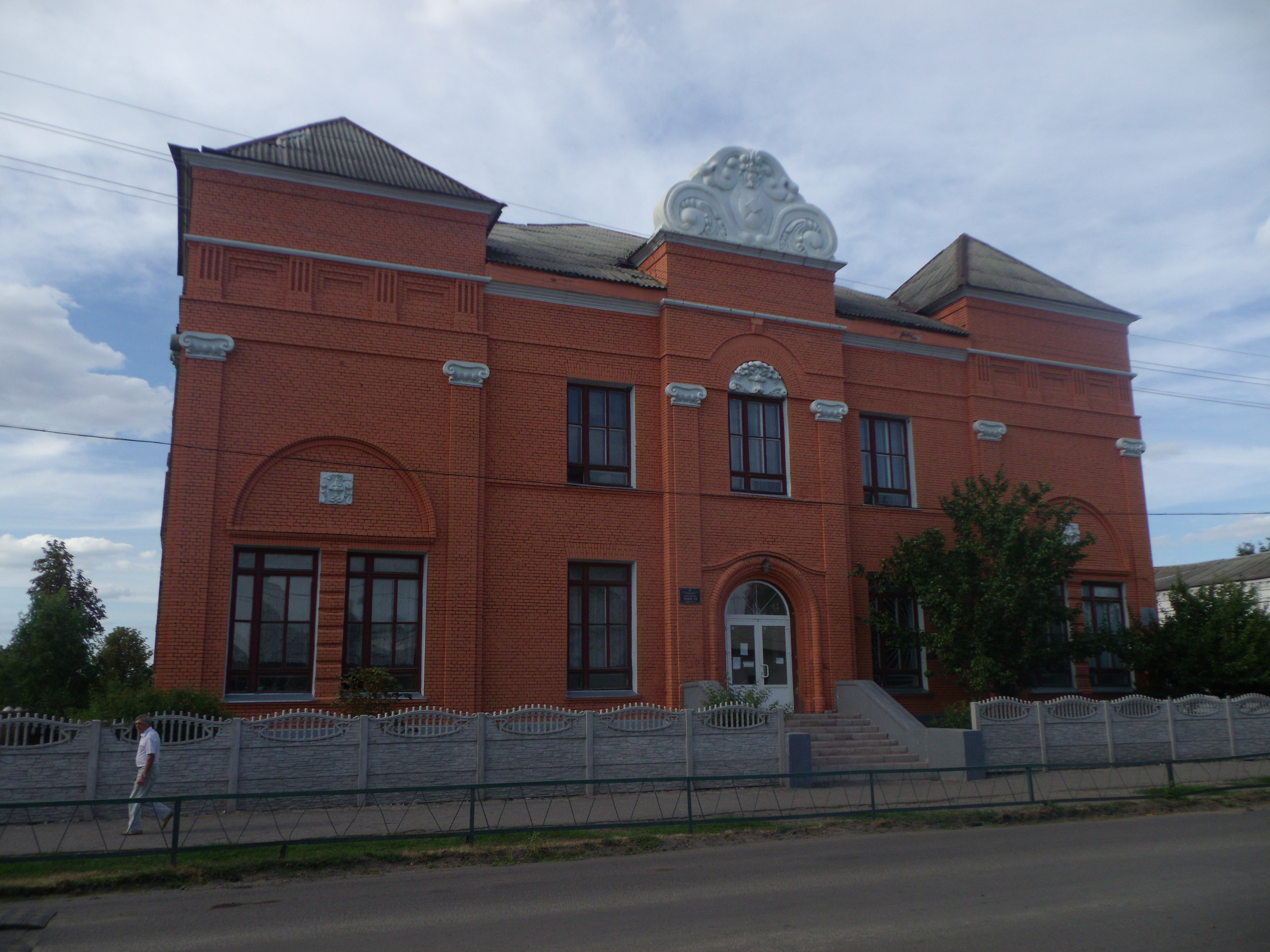
High school no. 2

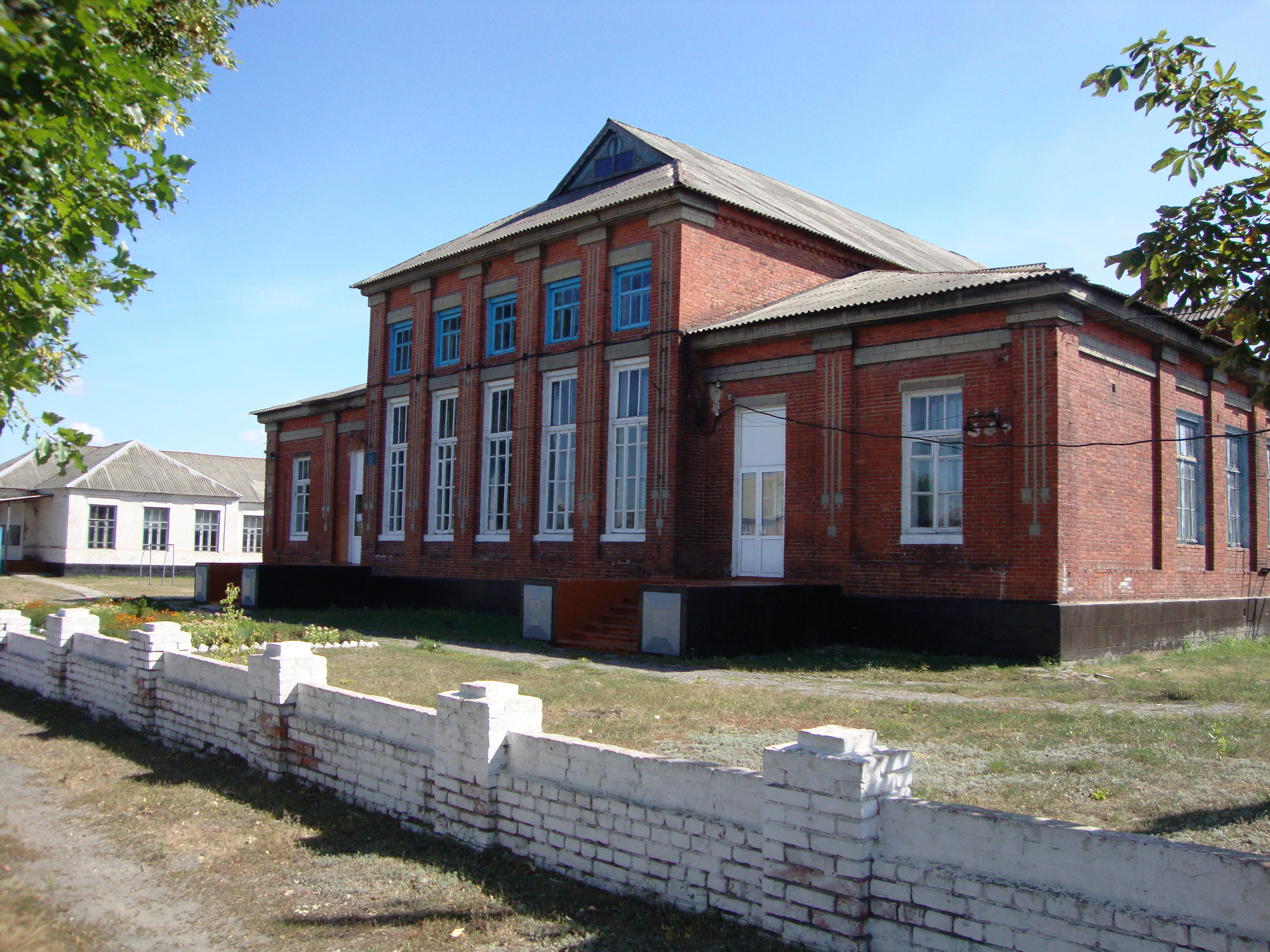
High school no. 3

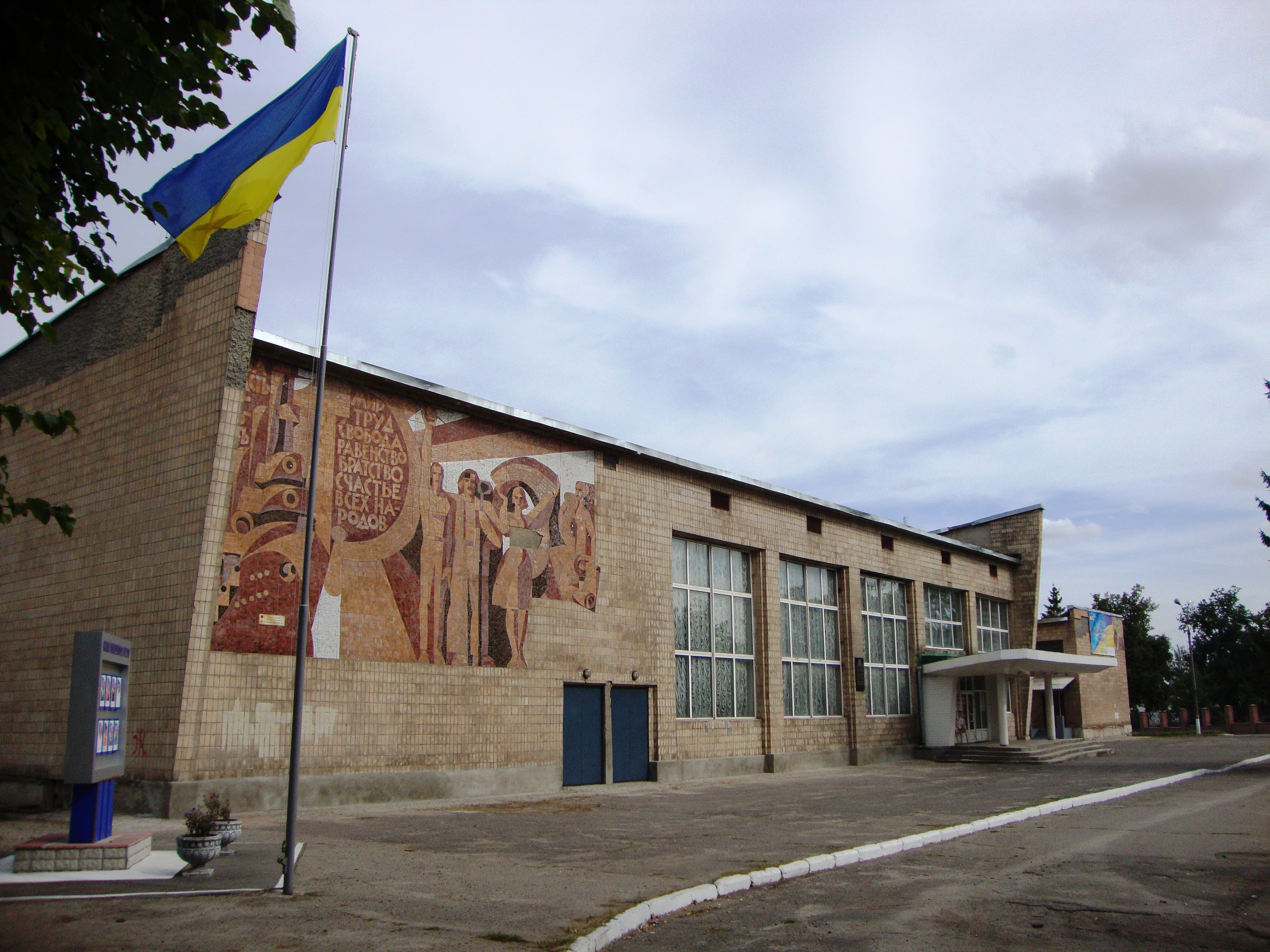
Palace of Culture

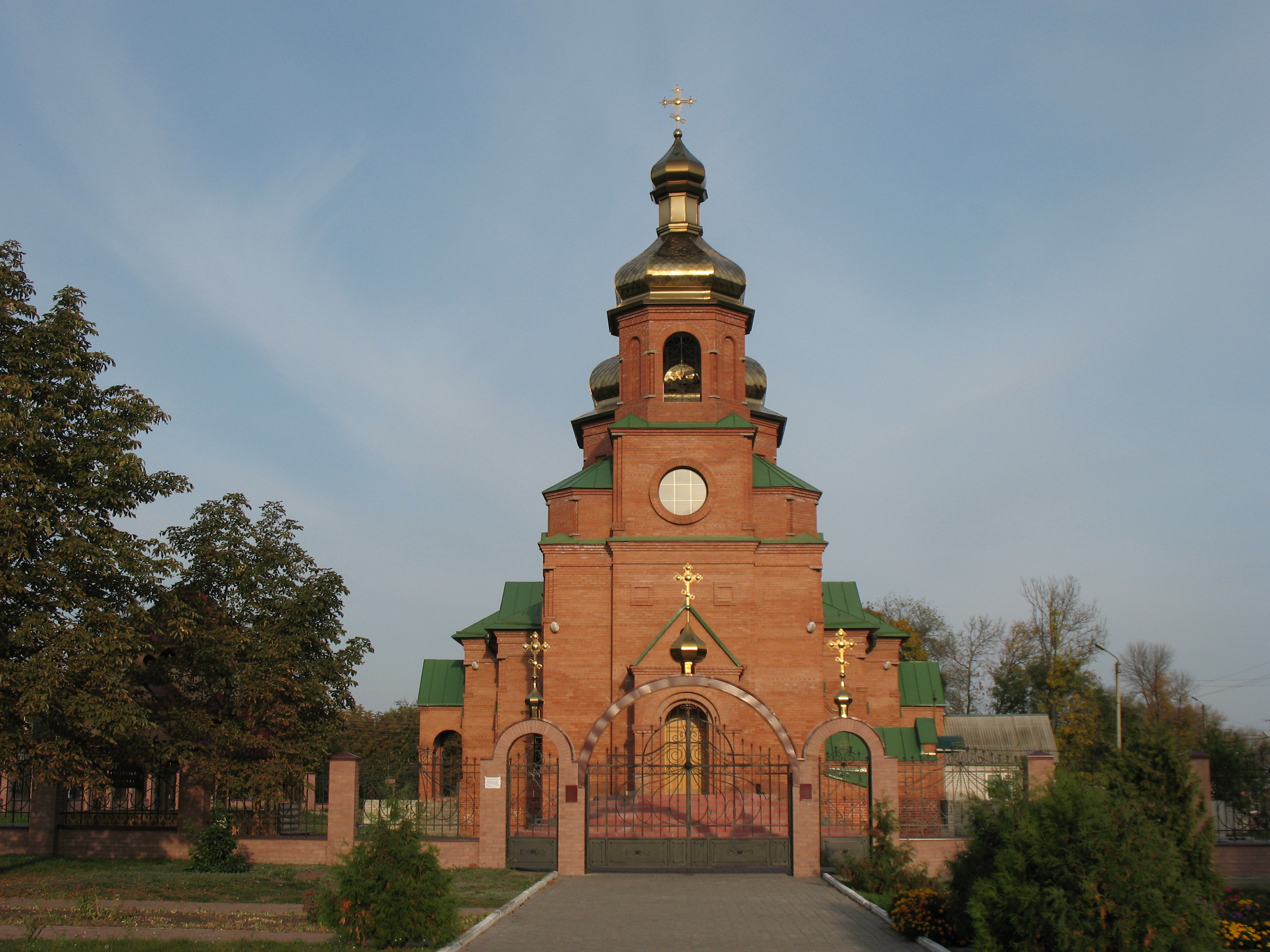
Orthodox Church

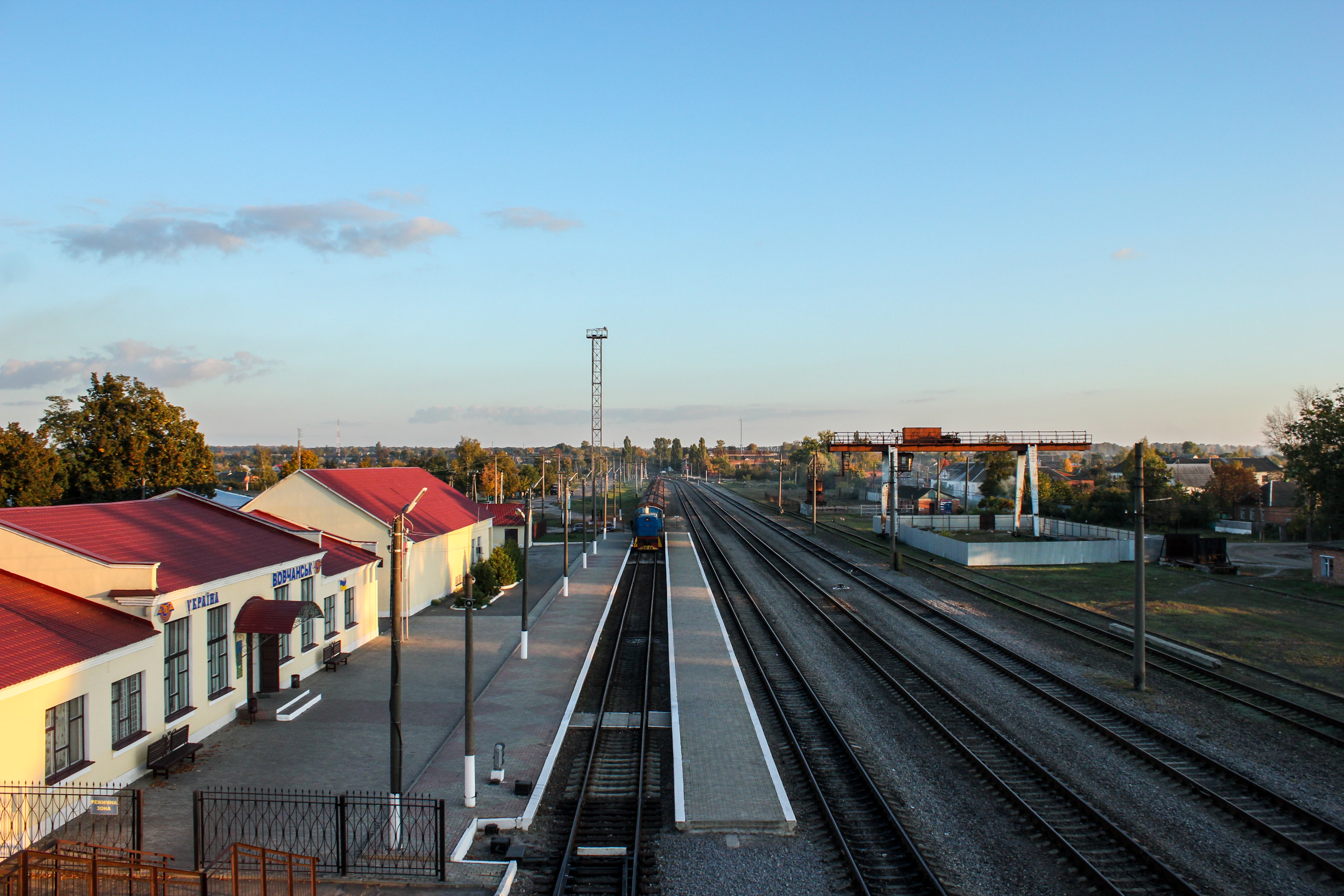
Railway station

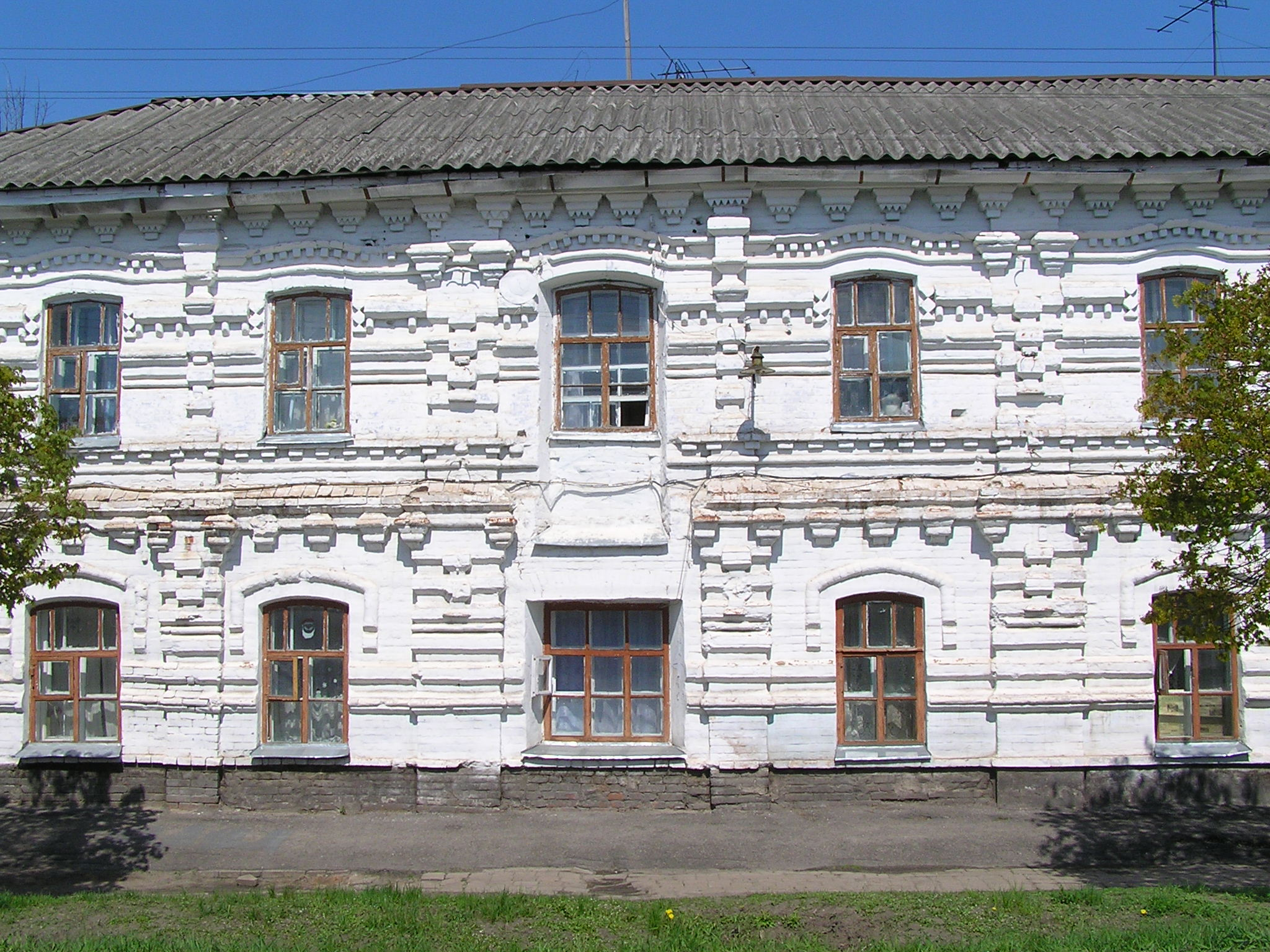
Vovchansk Medical College dormitory

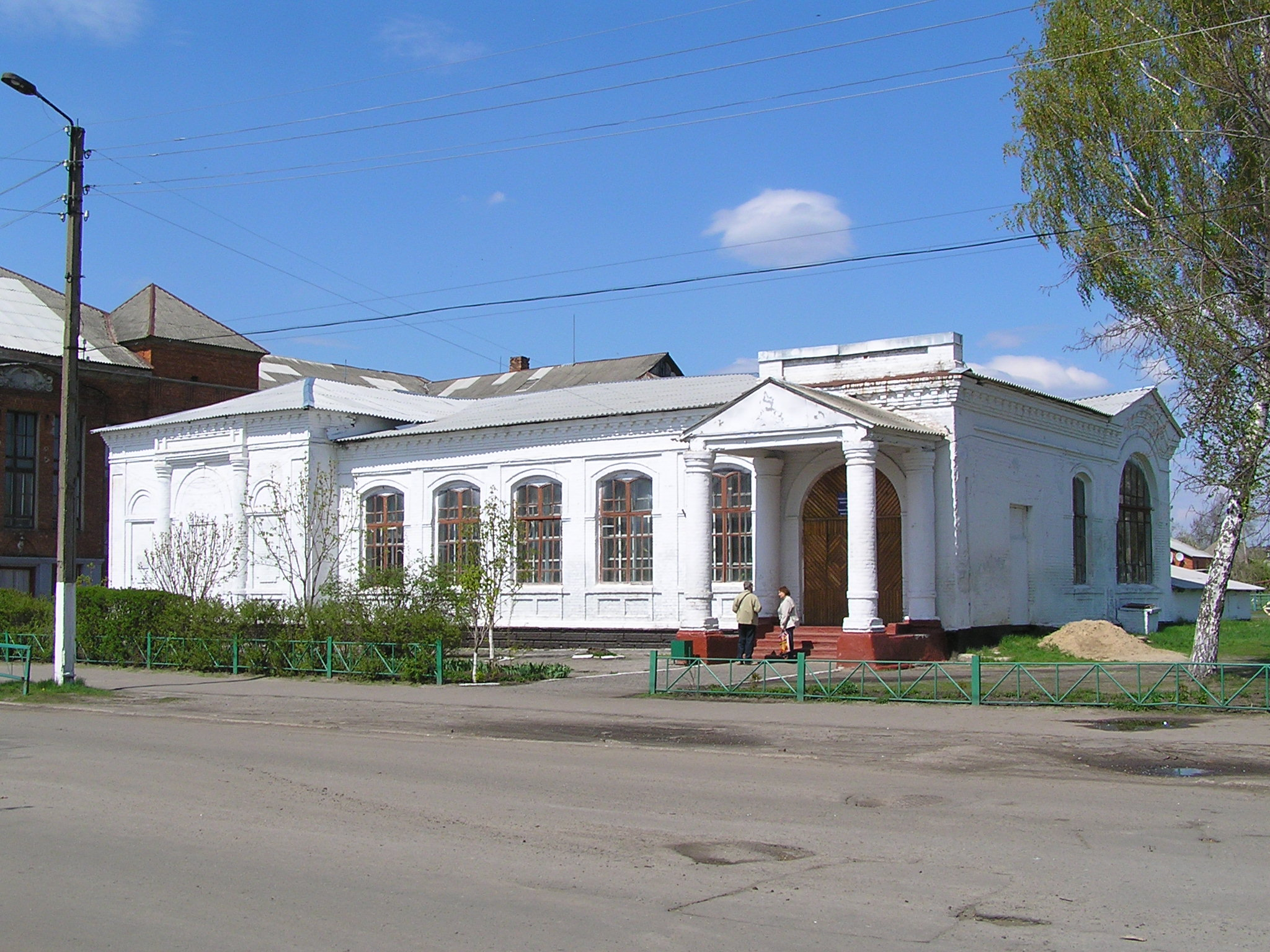
House of Children's and Youth Creativity

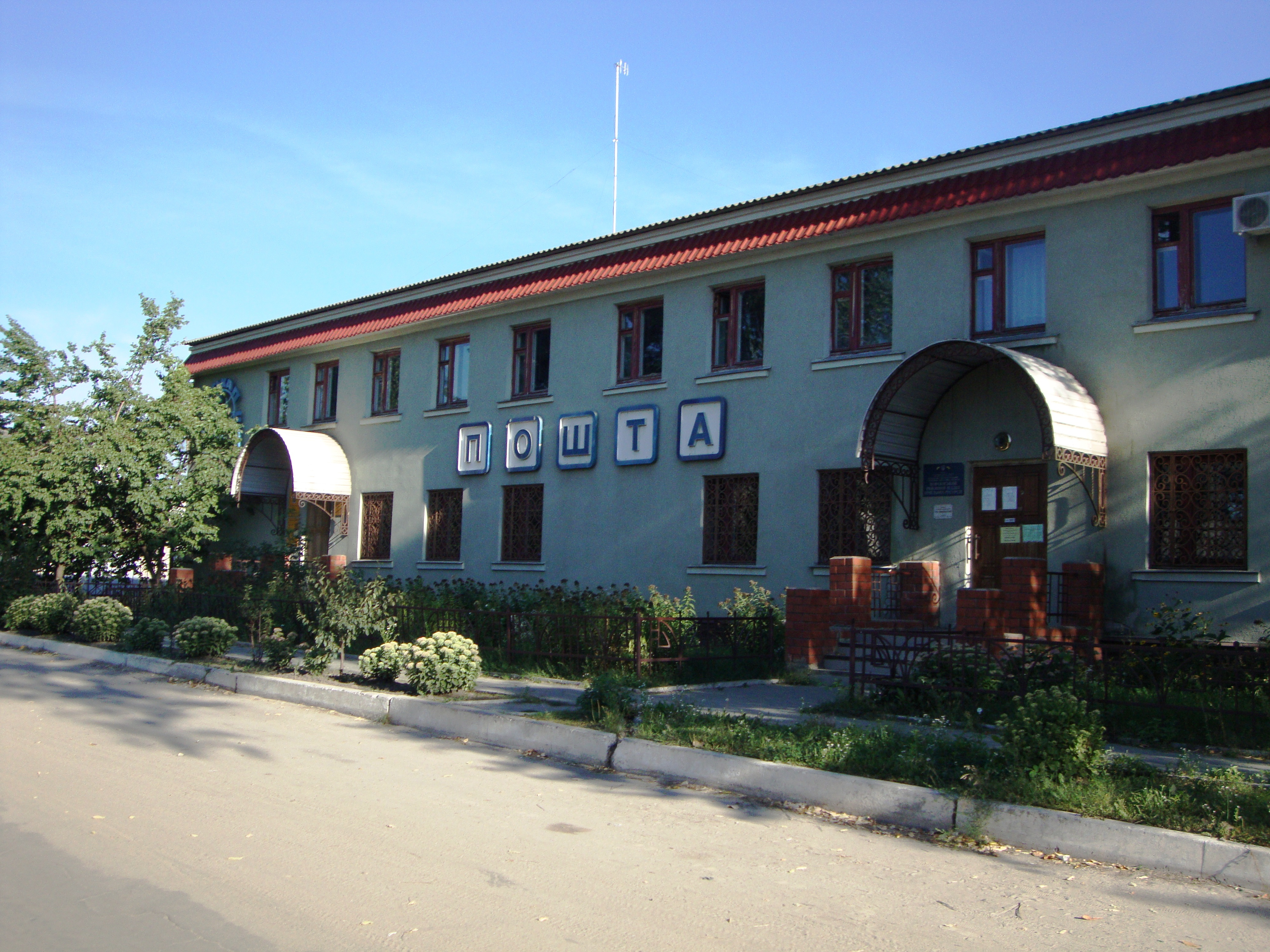
Post office

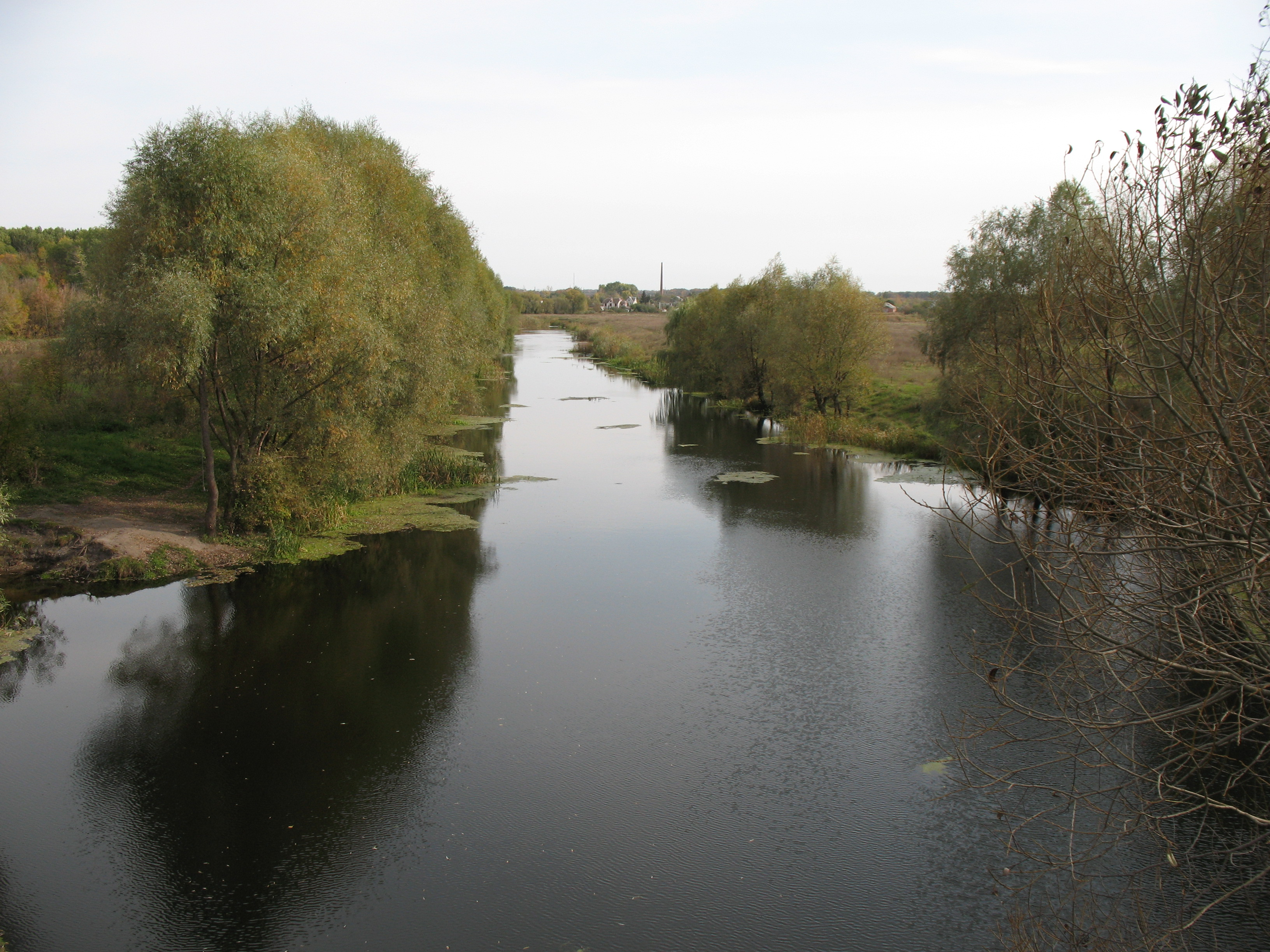
The city of Vovchansk on the Vovcha (Wolf) river

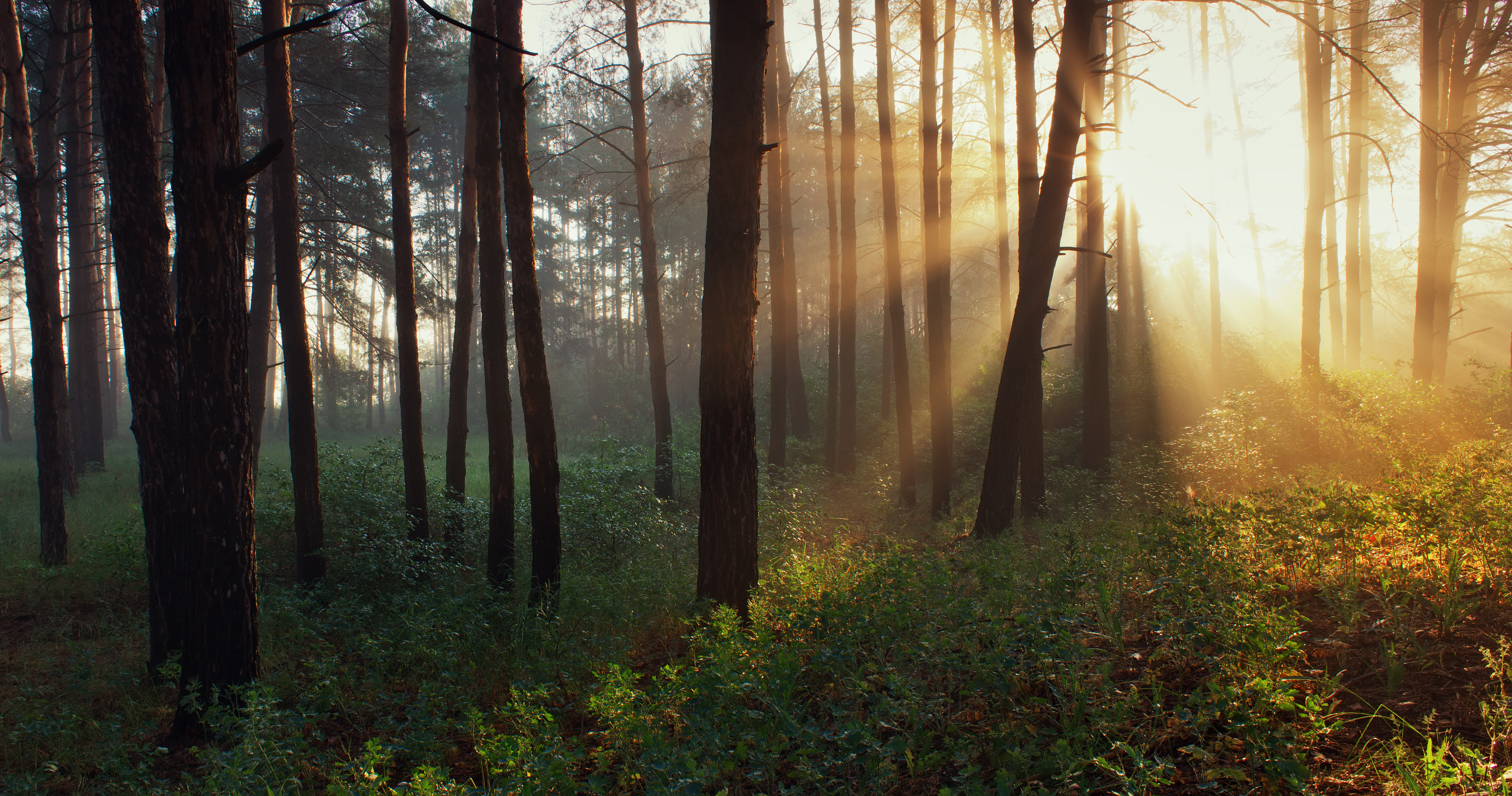
Vovchanskyi Reserve

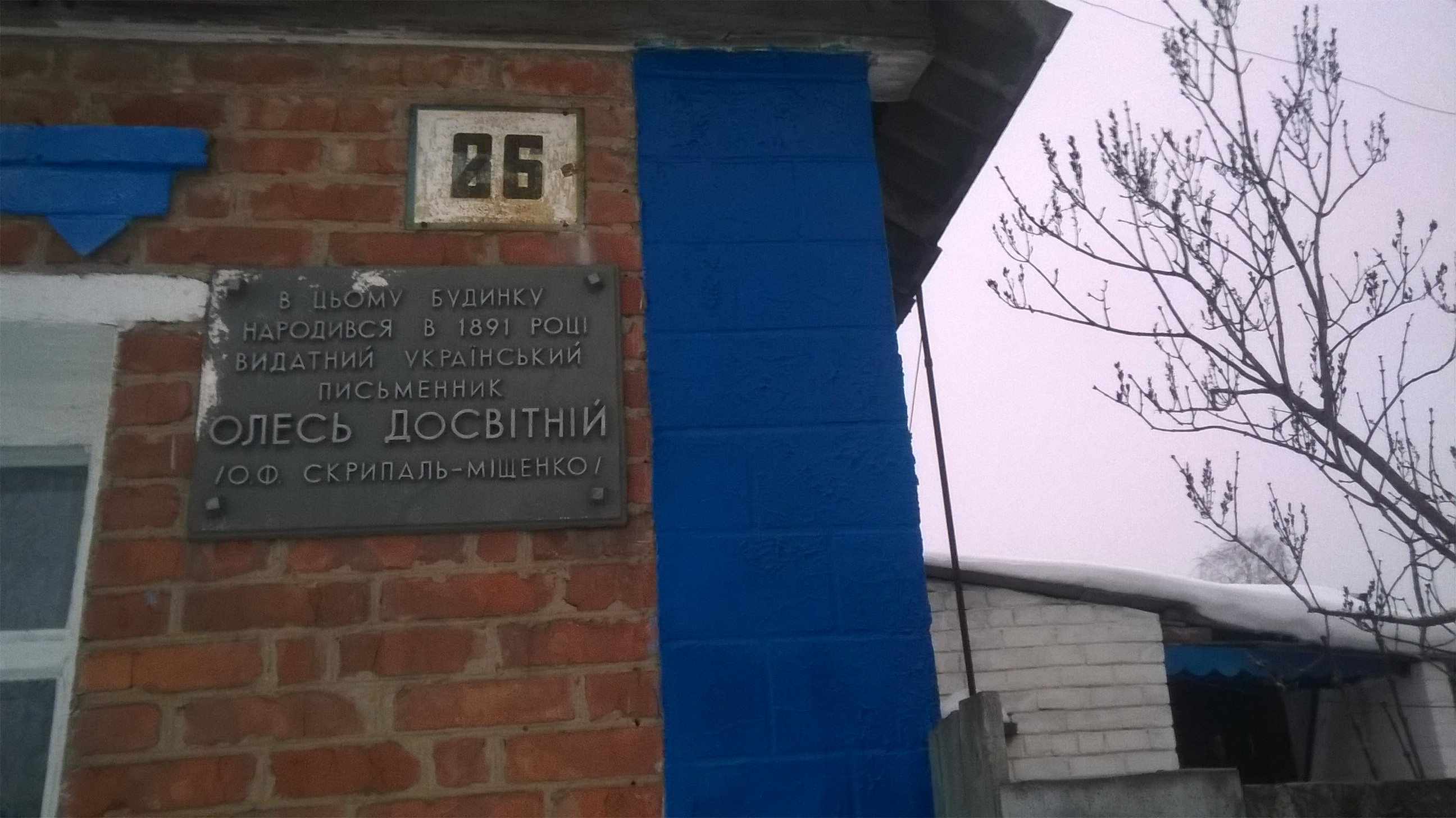
Memorial plaque on the former house of Oles Dosvitnii, a Ukrainian politician who was a victim of Stalinist terror

== See also ==
- Vilcha
- FC Vovchansk
