= Zaraysk Kremlin =

Fort in Zaraysk, Moscow Oblast, Russia

- Part of Great Abatis Line
- Zaraysk, Moscow Oblast Russia
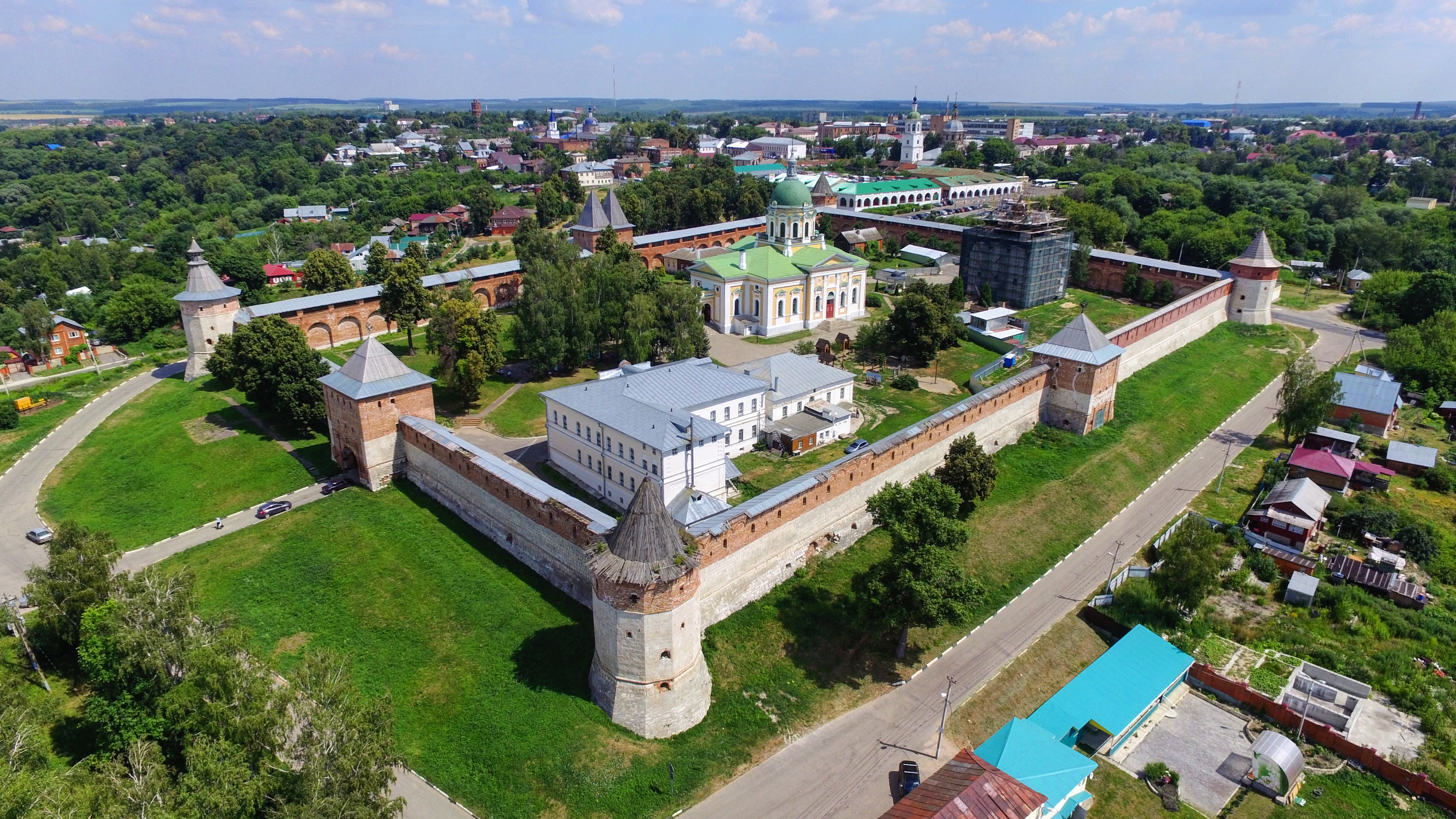

Site information
- Type: Kremlin
- Condition: Restored

Location
- Coordinates: 54°45′24″N 38°52′9″E

Site history
- Built: 1528-1531

The Zaraysk Kremlin is a rectangular fortified citadel, built at the behest of Vasili III of Moscow between 1528 and 1531. The town of Zaraysk is located between Moscow and Ryazan.

== History ==
Novogorodok-upon-the-Osyotr (later renamed Zaraysk) became part of the Grand Duchy of Moscow when the Principality of Ryazan lost its independence in 1503. Till that point, Ryazan had provided a protective buffer for Muscovy against potential attacks from the nomadic Tatars in the south.

Just two years after completion in 1531, the new stone-walled kremlin found itself under attack from Crimean Tatars. There was another attack in 1541 from forces under the Crimean khan Sahib I Giray, which was beaten off by Nazar Glebov. Further attacks by Crimean Tatars took place 1544, in 1570, 1573 and 1591.

In the 17th century, the growing settlement near the fortress acquired the name Zaraysk. In 1608, during the Time of Troubles, the kremlin fell into the hands of Polish invaders under the leadership of Aleksander Józef Lisowski, but was subsequently liberated by Dmitry Pozharsky. The last attack from Crimean Tatars was documented in 1673. After this episode the fortress was placed under the protection of the icon of the Theotokos of Kazan.

In 1681 Czar Feodor III authorized the rebuilding of the St. Nicholas Cathedral to replace the existing timber structure which had fallen into disrepair. During the eighteenth century, Zaraysk lost its strategic importance with the opening up of new trade routes. At the start of the twentieth century it was decided to rebuild the Church of the beheading of St John the Baptist (Церковь Иоанна Предтечи) (ru). Less than twenty years later, with a new secular political régime calling the shots from Moscow, the entire Kremlin enclosure was redefined as a museum complex in 1918. During the Great Patriotic War the town was near the frontline, but the Zaraysk Kremlin emerged undamaged.

Between 1987 and 1993 the complex benefitted from extensive restoration work, commissioned by the Moscow-based Department for Cultural Assets, but the restoration work remains incomplete following the withdrawal of funding. In 1998 a new "Museum of the Kremlin of Zaraysk" was established, containing a range of artefacts from Russia, western Europe, China and Japan.

== Description ==
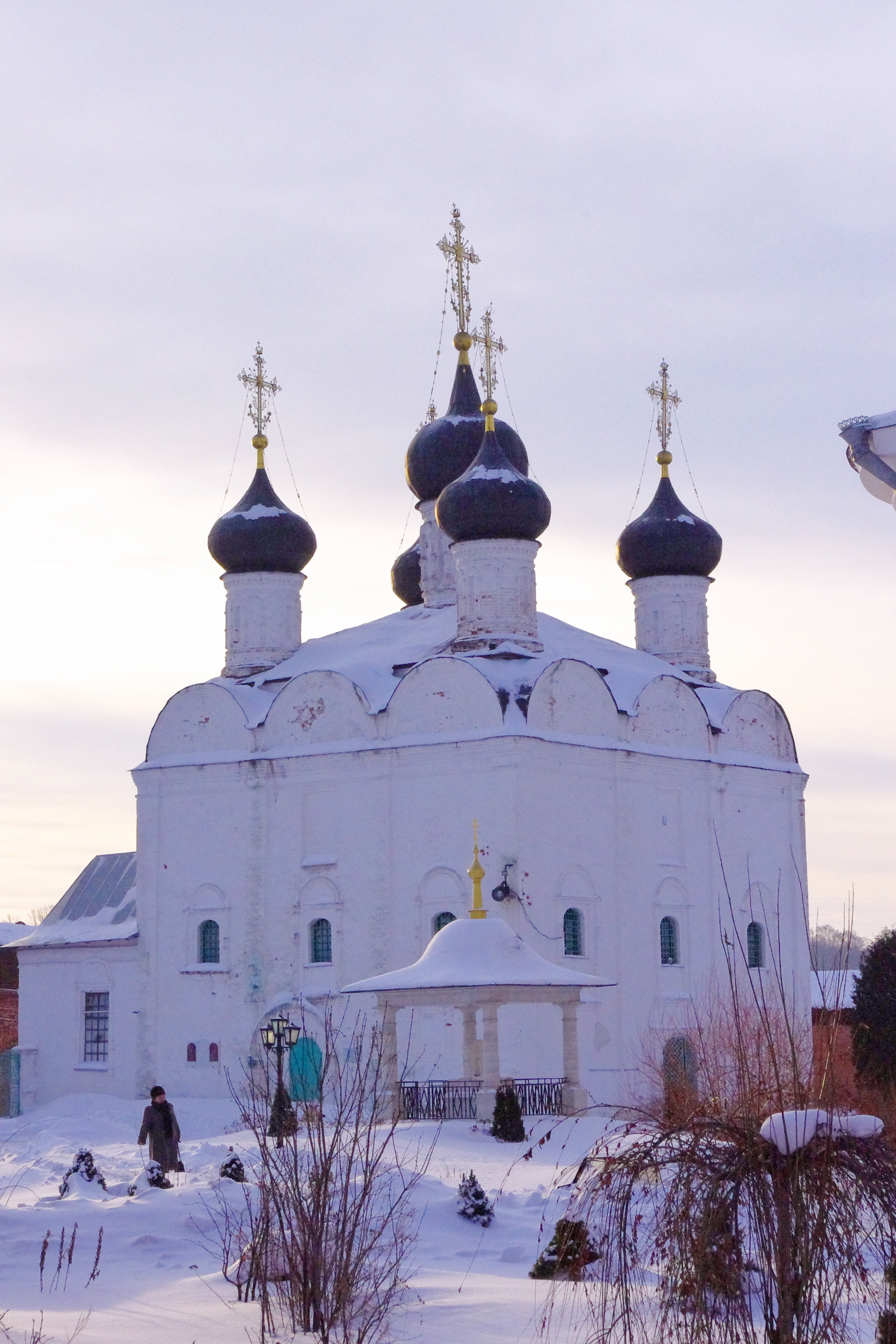
The Cathedral of St Nicholas

The Zaraysk Kremlin is conceptually similar to other Russian kremlins of its time, including the Moscow Kremlin constructed a few decades earlier. Its 2.4-hectare footprint is smaller than that of the other surviving medieval kremlins, however. It is positioned high on the eastern river bank opposite the confluence of the Osyotr and Oka Rivers. When it was built it was intended purely as a defensive outpost of the Grand Duchy of Moscow, to guard in particular against the frequent attacks from the Tatars. It was one of several strongholds along the course of the Oka which together comprised what came to be known as the Great Abatis Line.

One source identifies the architect of the Kremlin as Aloisio the New, better known for his numerous commissions in Moscow. Others assert that, as with most Russian fortifications outside Moscow, there is no surviving record of the name of the architect of the Kremlin at Zaraysk, and there is no surviving record of Aloisio having still been alive in the 1530s. The lay-out of the citadel follows the tradition of old Russian fortification buildings. The relatively small Zaraysk Kremlin has walls than are 9 m (30 ft) high and up to 3 m (9.8 ft) meters thick, constructed of brick and limestone blocks. Seven watch towers are incorporated in the walls including four twelve-sided corner towers. The other three towers, positioned midway along the northern, western and southern walls, include robust entrance gates into the kremlin. All the towers incorporate gun openings, designed so that artillery pieces can be directed against attackers outside or, with the guns turned round, inside the kremlin walls.

Within the walls two historical church buildings survive, both built very much more recently than the Kremlin itself. The St. Nicholas Cathedral (Никольский собор), topped off with no fewer than five onion domes, was built in 1681, replacing an earlier timber structure. Nearby is the Church of the beheading of St John the Baptist, architecturally very different, consecrated in 1821 and most recently rebuilt in 1901-1904. While the St. Nicholas Cathedral follows the traditional Russian style, the John the Baptist Church, with its single dome, follows neoclassical principles.

== Archaeology ==
Outside the kremlin wall is an Upper Paleolithic (Gravettian) site which has revealed a bison figurine and two mammoth ivory Venus figurines. The finds are exhibited at the Zaraysk Kremlin museum.
