= Belgorod Razriad =

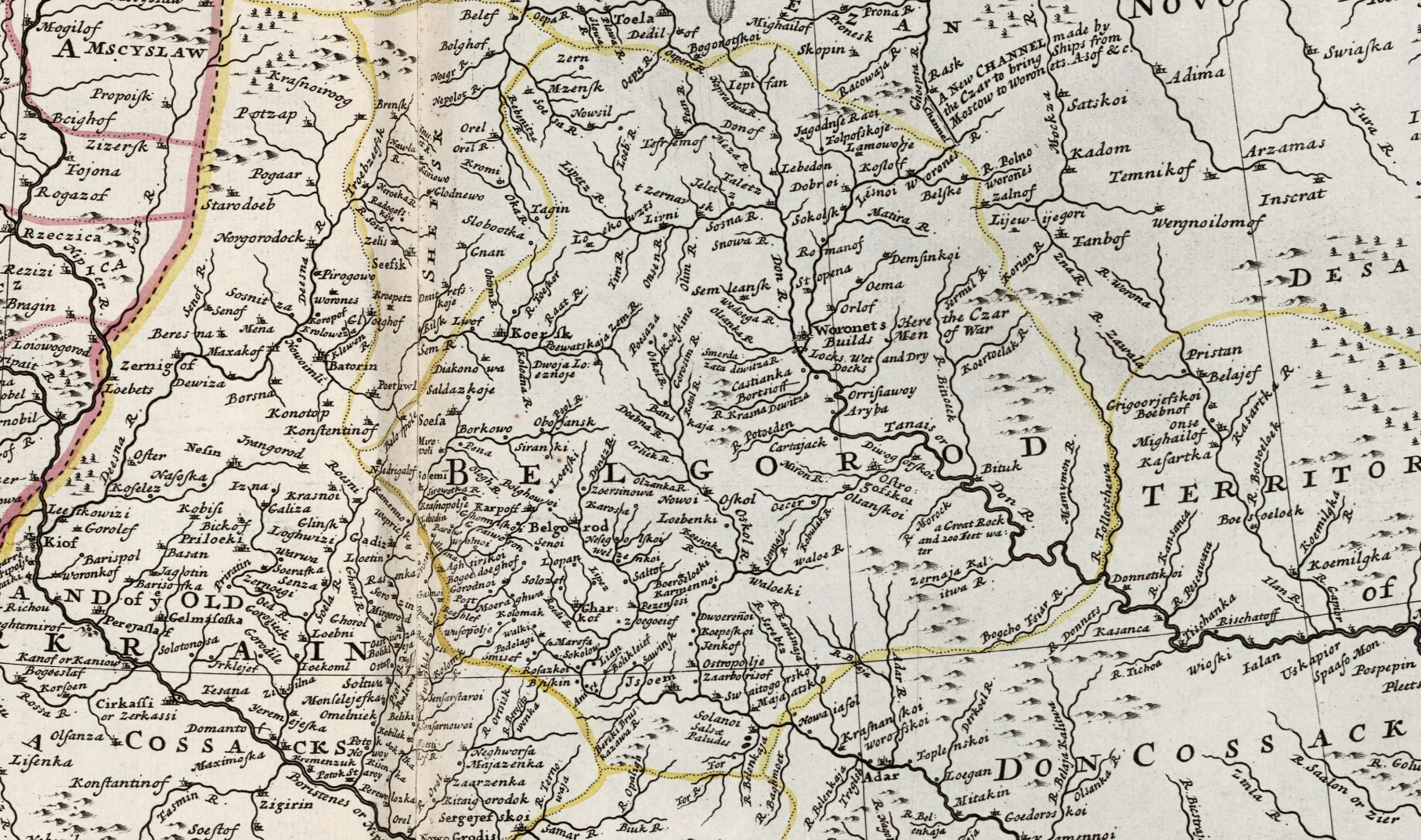
Belgorod Razriad - Herman Moll

Belgorod Razriad (rus. Белгородский разряд) was an autonomous military and administrative unit of the Tsardom of Russia, in the 17th-18th centuries, established on the part of former Crimean Khanate territory. Its purpose was the defense against Tatar raids along the so called Belogrod Defense Line (rus. Белгородская черта) and to offer settlement areas for Cossacks based on sloboda privilege.

== History ==
Flag of Belgorod Razriad

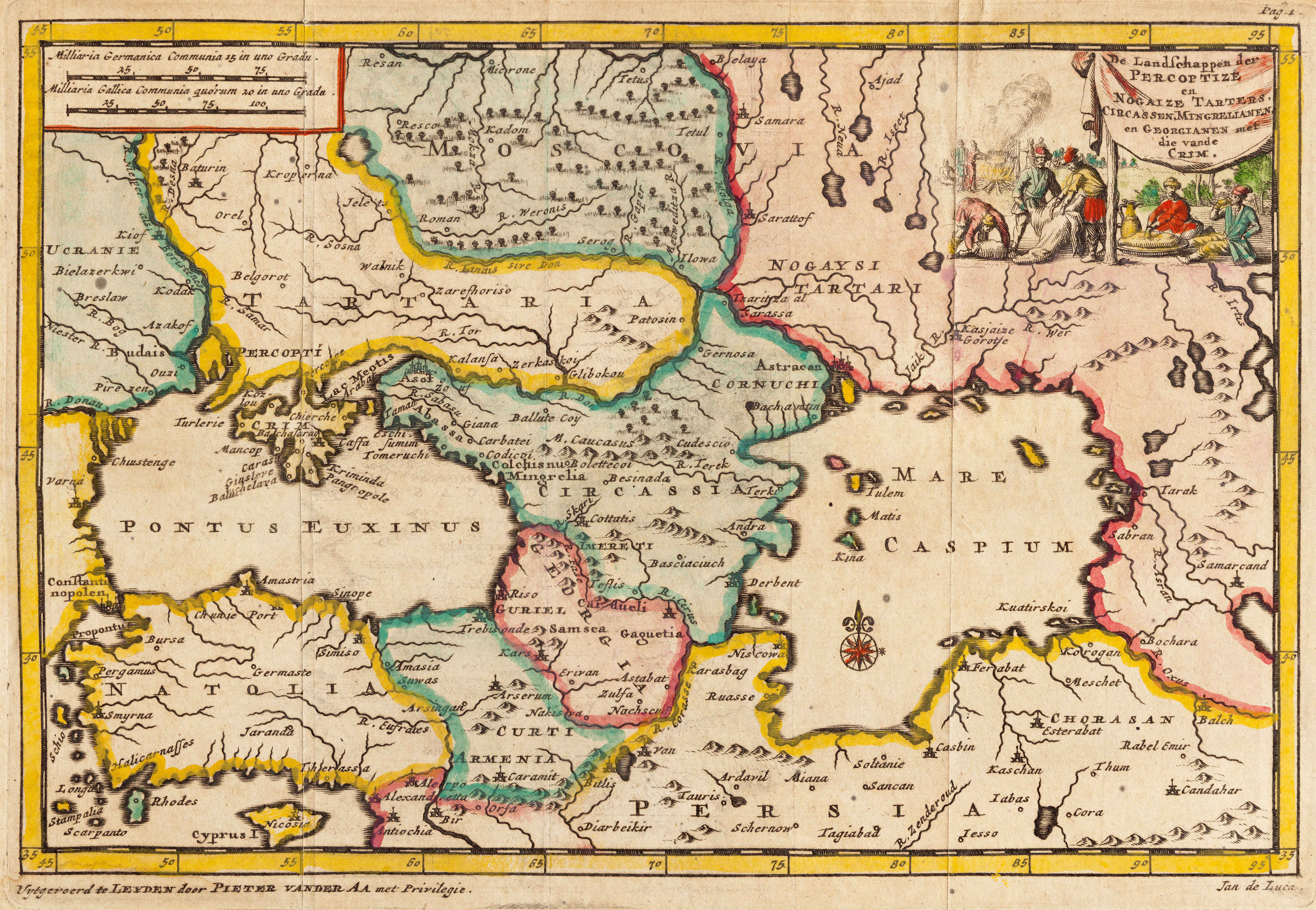
The map of the Tartaria lands by Pieter van der Aa with indicated settlements of Belgorod and Orel under Tatar control before establishing Belgorod Razriad.

Crimean Tatars and Nogais frequently attacked the southern borders of Muscovy in the first half of 17th century, burning houses and grains, killing or capturing villagers. Since 1636, the construction of a new fortified line began - the Belgorod Defense Line with its center in Belgorod. In 1647 the government started to confiscate villages from boyars and monastery owners. Peasants were put into new dragoon formations and removed from private jurisdiction in a very similar way to Cossacks.

Since the early 1650s the area near the line was quickly populated, especially, when there was a large movement of the border (Ukrainian) population to free lands at the invitation of the Russian Tsar.

The Razriad was established in 1658 and was located on the territory of the modern Oryol, Kursk, Belgorod, Sumy, Kharkov and Voronezh regions. The administrative center was first Belgorod, and then Kursk. The Belgorod Razriad included also Sloboda Cossack regiments.

The first voivode of Belgorod Razriad was Grigory Romodanovsky.

The voivode of the Belgorod Razriad also headed the Belgorod regiment. In case of military danger, the voivodes of Orel, Tula, and Yelets were also supposed to converge with their detachments under his command. Thus, the Belgorod Razriad territorially and administratively covered, in whole or in part, the current Orel, Kursk, Belgorod, Sumy, Kharkov, and Voronezh regions.

The Belgorod Razriad was abolished by the decree of Peter I on December 18, 1708 due to larger administrative reform and its towns were included in Kiev Governorate.

== See also ==
- Sloboda Ukraine
