= Razriad =

Type of military administrative subdivision

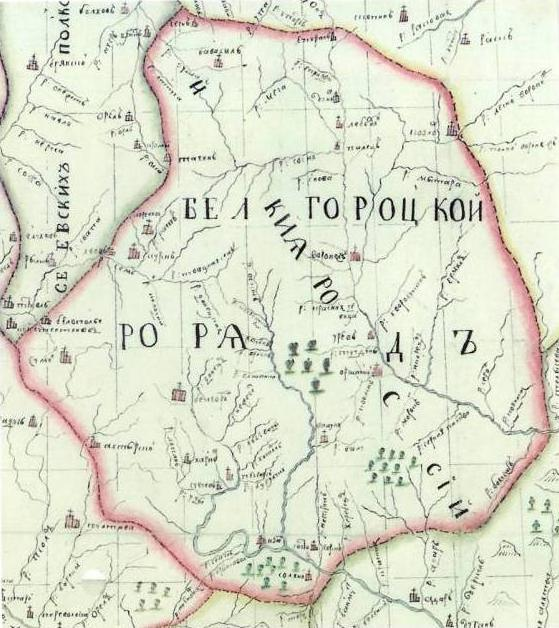
Map of the Belgorod razriad in the 17th century

A razriad, or razryad (Russian: разря́д), was a type of military administrative subdivision of the Tsardom of Russia from the 16th to the 17th centuries. Service class people living within razriads were obliged to enter military service and join razriad regiments. Each regiment incorporated several military units, including streltsy, reiters, dragoons, and other types of soldiers. Razriads were governed by the main organ for the administration of the Razriad Prikaz.

== History ==
Initially, territory in the Tsardom of Russia was subdivided into uezds. As the territory of the tsardom expanded, this administrative system encountered certain issues. The large number of relatively small uezds that were directly governed by Moscow especially burdened the borderlands of the state, where officials called for the expansion of voivode authority to more efficiently organize troops. The first razriads, larger in size and geared toward military organization, were developed in these borderland uezds.

The first razriad, founded in the 16th century, was centered in Tula. The Tula voivode directed urban and regiment voivodes from the river Oka to the Upa. With the razriad, the Tula voivode combined military and administrative authority, managed the collection of funds, and directed local authority.

By 1616, the population of fortified towns designated as razriads reached 24,350.

Each razriad was composed of several uezds. As a result of the 1680 military and territorial reforms, the entire territory of the Tsardom of Russia became subdivided into 9 razriads, and all service class people assigned among them. Service class people were divided among razriad regiments, and a permanent Bolshoi regiment was created for one of the borderland razriads. Razriads were primarily a military administrative unit, similar to contemporary military districts in the Russian Federation, and headed by razriad voivodes. Razriad voivodes were divided into both military and administrative positions of authority, in accordance with the defensive interests of each razriad. The razriads became an intermediate between central authority and the local uezds, and paved the way for the creation of governorates in the 18th century.

== List of razriads ==
- Moscow Razriad
- Sevsk Razriad
- Vladimir Razriad
- Novgorod Razriad
- Kazan Razriad
- Smolensk Razriad
- Ryazan Razriad
- Belgorod Razriad, chartered in 1658 out of the Kiev Voivodeship
- Tambov Razriad
- Tula Razriad
- Tobol Razriad, chartered no later than 1587 (first known voivodeship)
- Tom Razriad
- Yenisei Razriad

== See also ==
- History of the administrative division of Russia
