= Venus figurines of Zaraysk =

Paleolithic sculptures

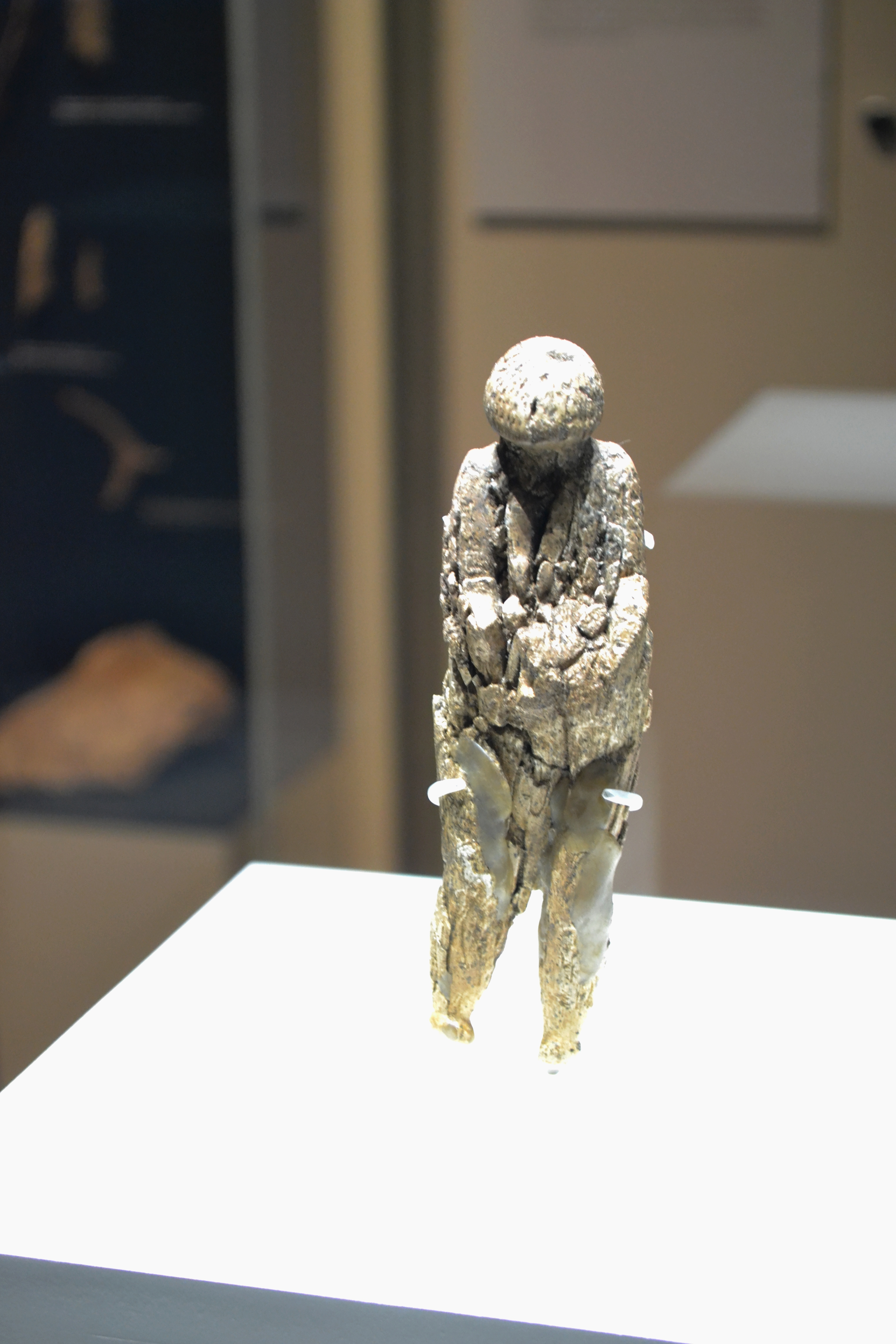
- Venus figurine No. 1 from Zaraysk
- Material: Mammoth ivory
- Created: 22,000 to 16,000 years
- Discovered: 2005; Zaraysk, Moscow Oblast, Russia
- Discovered by: Hizri Amirkhanov and Sergey Lev

The Venus figurines from Zaraysk are two paleolithic sculptures of the female body. Both are made of mammoth ivory. The age of these Venus figurines is about 20,000 to 14,000 years BC; they stem from the Gravettian. Zaraysk is a Russian town located between Moscow and Ryazan. The statuettes were found in 2005 by Hizri Amirkhanov and Sergey Lev. Finds from Zaraysk show features of both the Avdeevo culture and the Kostenki culture.

The location of the excavation is under the wall of the Zaraysk Kremlin. The sculptures are kept at the local museum. The so-called figurine No. 1 is 16,6 cm high, shows a female body without a face. Presumably, the woman is depicted pregnant. Figurine No. 2 is not finished and 7.4 cm high. Both figurines were found near each other and were covered with the scapula of a mammoth. Both were bedded in fine sand, near the head was placed red ochre.

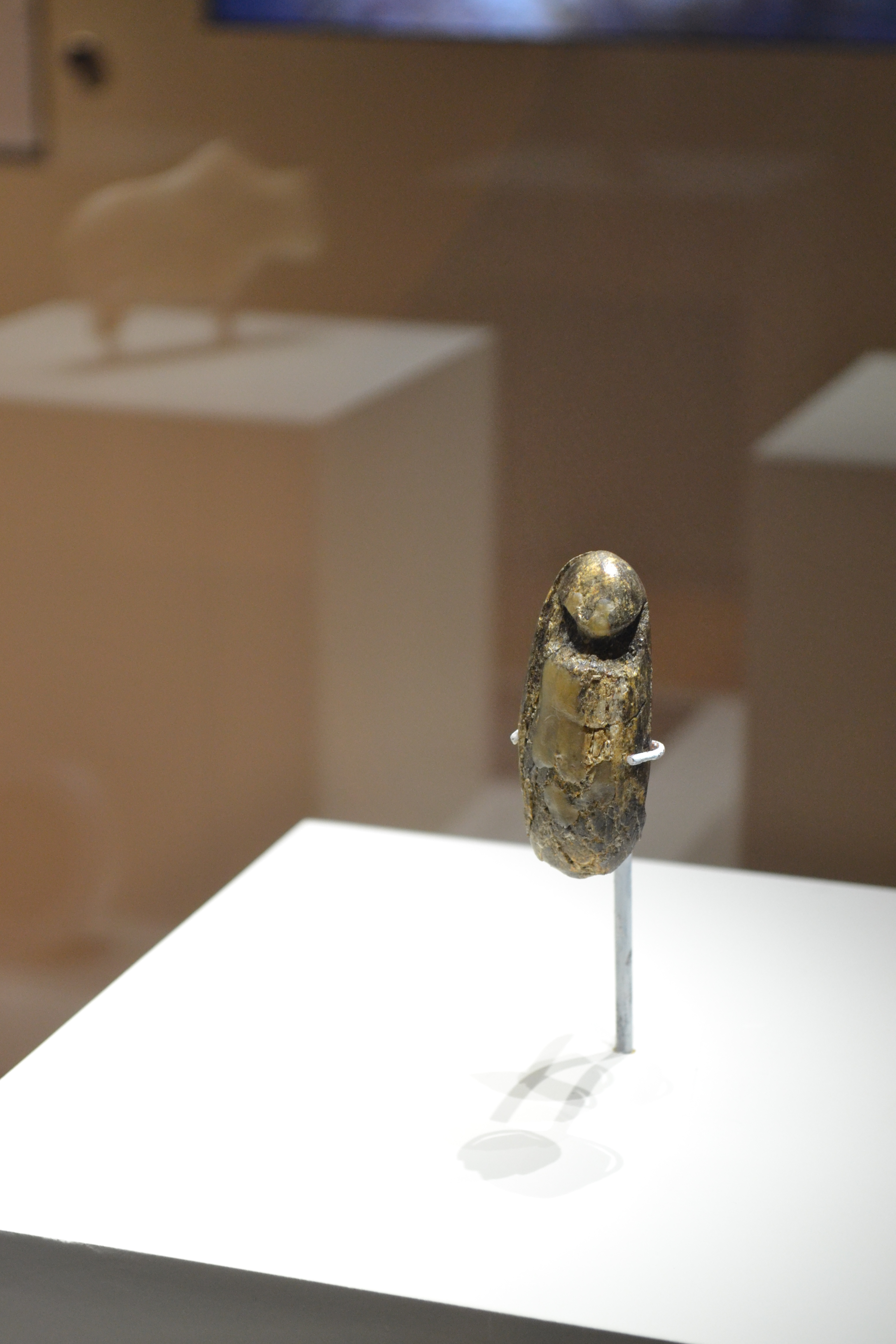
Venus figurine No. 2 from Zaraysk

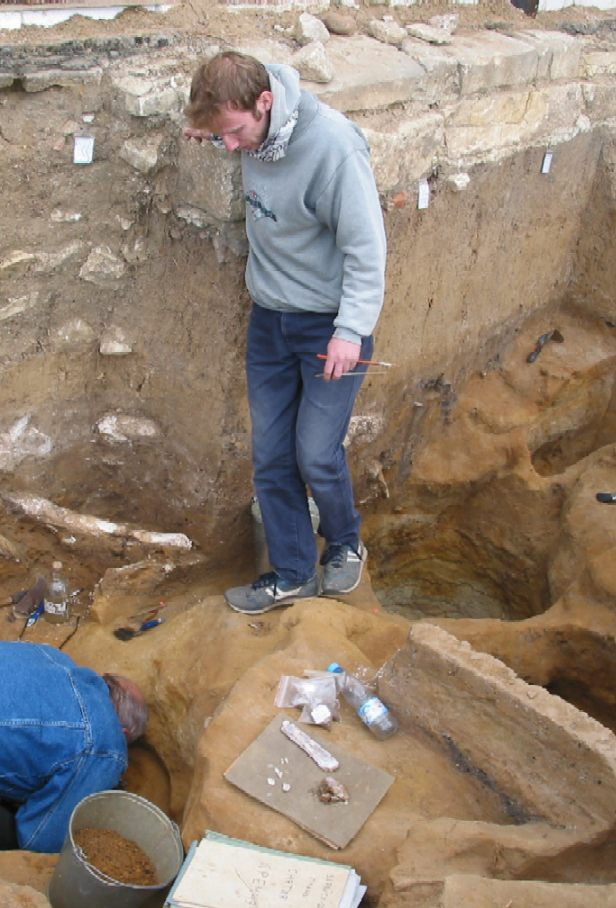
Extraction of a figurine by archaeologists

== See also ==
- Venus figurines of Mal'ta
- Venus figurines of Gagarino
- Venus figurines of Avdeevo
- Venus figurines of Kostenki

== Literature ==
- Amirkhanov H., Lev S., 2008: New finds of art objects from the Upper Palaeolithic site of Zaraysk, Russia, Antiquity 82 (318), p. 862–870
- Cook, Jill 2013: Ice Age Art: the Arrival of the Modern Mind, London: British Museum Press. (p. 85 f., picture) ISBN 978-0-7141-2333-2
