= Muravsky Trail =

Historical trail in southern Russia and Ukraine

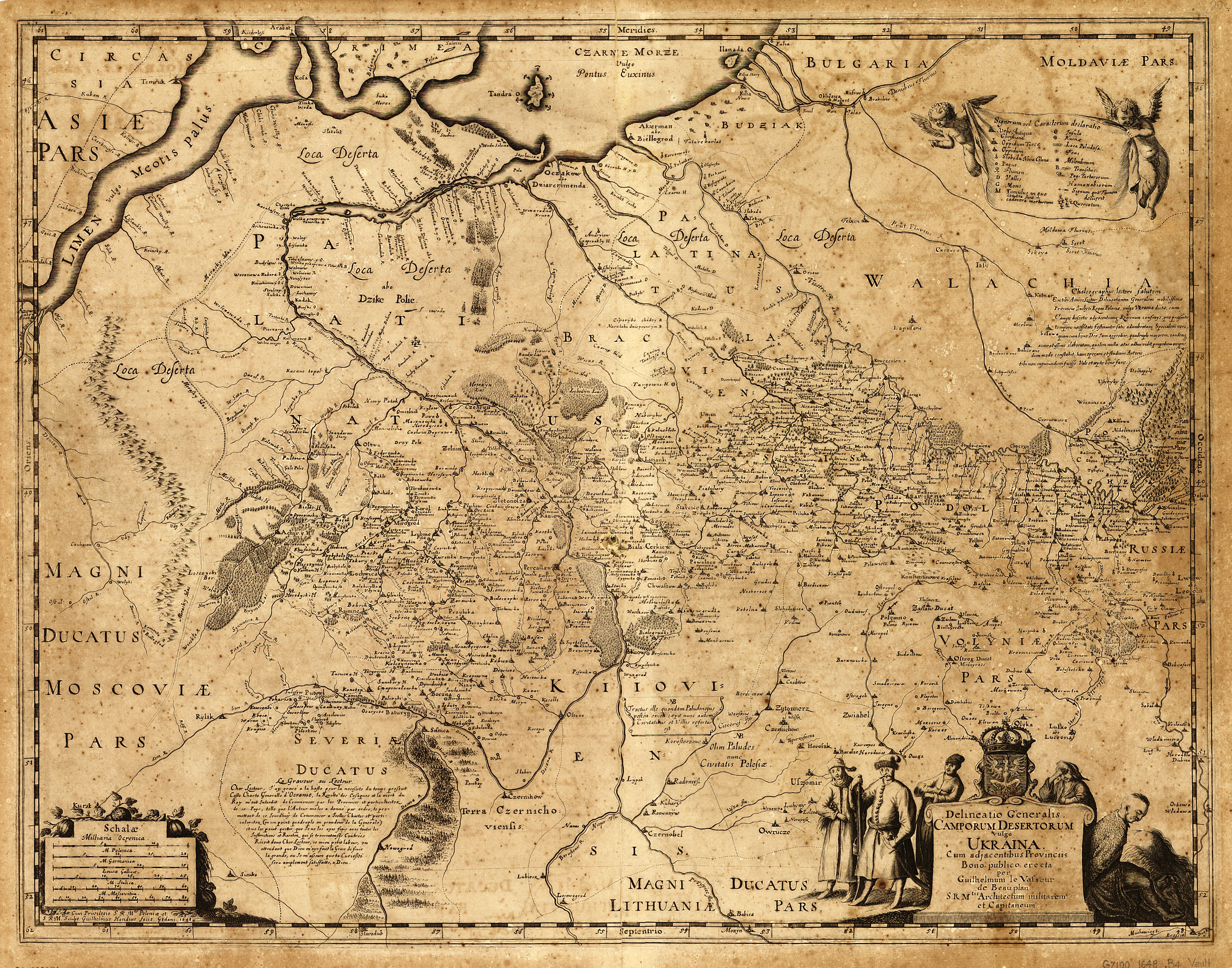
Vasseur de Beauplan's 1648 map of the Wild Fields showing the Muravsky Trail on the left (east)

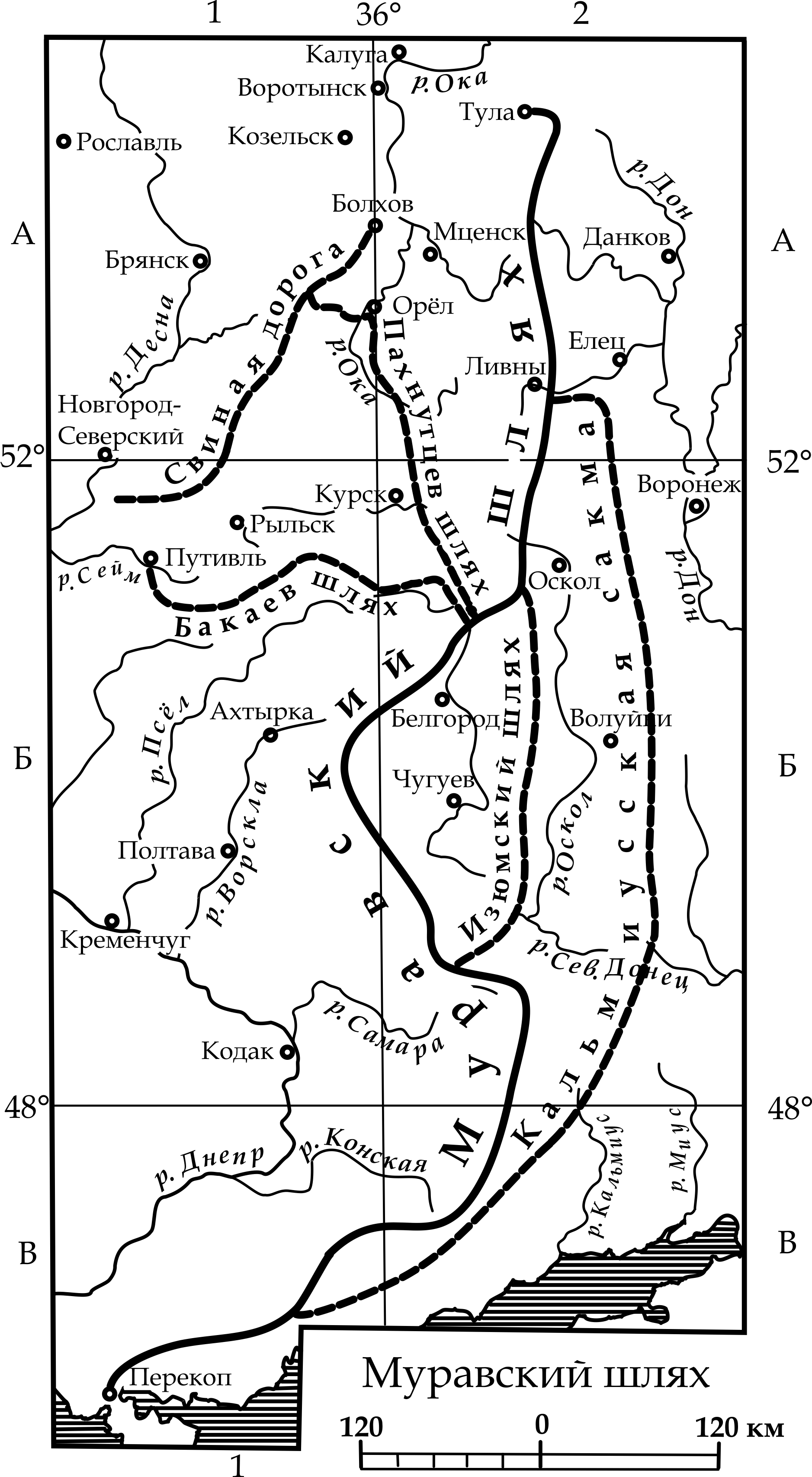
Trails leading toward of South-Central Rus'.

Muravsky Trail or Murava Route (Russian: Муравский шлях; Ukrainian: Муравський шлях) was an important trade route and an invasion route of the Crimean Nogays during the Russo-Crimean Wars of the 16th and early 17th centuries. As described in the Book to the Great Chart of Muscovy (1627), the route went north from the Tatar fortress of Or Qapı (Perekop), the gateway of the Crimean peninsula, east of the Dnieper, to the Russian fortress of Tula, 193 km south of Moscow.

To avoid major river crossings, the route followed the high ground between the basins of the Dnieper and Don, making an almost straight line from the Dnieper bend to Tula. It ran mostly through thinly populated tallgrass steppe country ('Muravá' is an old Slavic word for prairie or grassland) avoiding forests, marshes and river crossings. Apart from the main route, there were a number of branches and bypaths, of which the Kalmius Trail and the Izium Trail were by far the most important.

Between 1500 and 1550, 43 Tatar raids used this trail. In the wake of the Russo-Crimean War (1571), it became increasingly clear that only a defense line south of the Great Zasechnaya cherta would put an end to annual incursions. Such a chain of eleven forts and obstructions, the "Belgorod Defense Line", was constructed at the behest of Boris Godunov, including, among other fortified settlements, the towns of Livny (1586), Voronezh (1586), Kursk (1587, rebuilt), Yelets (1592, rebuilt), Stary Oskol (1593), Valuyki (1593) and Belgorod (1596, rebuilt).

After this, the Tatars began avoiding this route. It later became a main route used by the Cossacks to raid Crimea.

== Tactics ==
Raiding trails and Defense Lines on map of Russian Central Federal District. From a map by Brian Davies (bibliography).
Yellow Dot: Oka River Bank Line (circa 1500)
Black X: Abatis Line (c 1533-66, a.k.a. Great Zasechnaya cherta).
Blue Circle: Belgorod Line (c 1634-50)
Blue Triangle: Izium Line (c1689)
Black Arrow: Raiding Trails (1507-1769)
Continued below on a different scale.
Raiding trails and Defense Lines on map of Ukraine. Continued from above.
Blue Circle: Belgorod Line (c 1634-50)
Blue Triangle: Izium Line (c 1680)
Arrows: Raiding Trails (1507-1769)

The Tatars preferred to invade at harvest time when forage was plentiful. Smaller raids were made in early winter when the rivers were frozen. Davies says that the journey to Moscow took 55 days. Larger raids were led by the Khan in person. The core of his force was a guard of 200-1000 musketeers with light artillery and supply carts that could be formed into a wagenburg. The main force consisted of horse archers with reflex bows and short stirrups. They also had sabers and lances and the richer ones might have chain mail, helmets or muskets. Each man brought one or two spare horses. They carried few supplies, preferring to live off the land. The army traveled in columns. Beauplan estimated a column as 800 to 1,000 paces across and up to 10 leagues long. 'It was an amazing sight since 80,000 Tatars were accompanied by more than 200,000 horses'. On nearing enemy territory they camped for a few days and sent out scouts to be sure there were no significant forces in the area. After penetration they sent out two wings of up to 10,000 men each from the main body to sweep the country for 10 or 12 leagues around, taking women, children, horses, sheep and cattle and those men who chose not to resist. When these wings returned to the main corps, other wings were sent out in the same manner. Having 'harvested' an area they withdrew by a different route. They did not waste time attacking fortified towns and avoided fighting organized forces unless they were forced to defend themselves. The returning columns, laden with booty, were most vulnerable to counterattack. The need to guard and escort captives kept the ratio of captives to raiders to about 1:3.

Individual Mirzas would lead smaller-scale raids with a few thousand men. They would send out scouts to look for enemy forces and capture prisoners for interrogation and then sweep through an area 10 to twelve leagues broad, rendezvousing at a pre-arranged point each night. If attacked they would split into bands of about 100 men ("chambuly") and scatter in all directions, reuniting later.

== Route ==
According to Davies, the trail started at Perekop (about 1100 km south of Moscow) and ran northeast parallel to the Sea of Azov coast about two thirds of the way and then swung north along the watershed between the basins of the Dnieper River and Donets. There it spread into branches through Sloboda Ukraine, the branches rejoining at Stary Oskol (618 km south of Moscow) and Livny (about 375 km south of Moscow). From Livny it went directly north to Tula and crossed the Oka River at Serpukhov almost directly south of Moscow. In the spread out section there were three branches. The western branch was the Muravsky proper which ran northwest to about Valki and then northeast west of Belgorod to Livny. The center or Izium Trail seems to have run directly north along the south-flowing part of the Donets and joined the Muravsky at Stary Oskol. The eastern or Kalmius branch ran east of the Donets and joined the others south of Livny. East of these was a route used by the Lesser Nogai Horde which ran from Azov to Livny. The Nogai Road proper was much farther east and ran from near Volgograd through Kozlov to the Oka at Ryazan.

He also mentions three trails running northwest from Perekop to Galicia. The Czarny Trail went north toward Kyiv with a branch at the latitude of Cherkasy going west to Galicia. The Kuczman Trail followed the south bank of the Bug and the Wolsky Trail followed the shore of the Black Sea and then the Dniester River.

=== Branches ===
- Izium Trail
- Kalmius Trail, named after river Kalmius

== See also ==
Black Trail
