= Black Trail =

Historical trail from Crimea to Western Ukraine

The Black Trail (Ukrainian: Чорний шлях; Polish: Szlak czarny; Tatar: Dzorna islach) was one of three main trails used by Crimean Tatars in their destructive raids over southeastern regions of the Polish–Lithuanian Commonwealth. The trail was named either after black traces left by the Tatars on chernozem, or after Black Forest, a wooded area at the confluence of the Syniukha River into the Southern Bug, where Tatars concentrated their forces before a raid.

The Black Trail began in the swamps of the lower Inhul river. It went northwards to the Dnieper, and then towards the Dnieper Upland. Near Korsun, it split into two trails: northwest (to Kiev) and southwest (to Zbarazр).

Another trail used by Tatars in their destructive raids over the Commonwealth was the so-called Podole Trail, or Kuczman Trail. It stemmed from the Black Trail near the contemporary town of Voznesensk, and went towards Bar. Near Ternopil, the Podolian Trail merged with the Black Trail.

== See also ==
- Crimean-Nogai raids into East Slavic lands
- Muravsky Trail
- Izium Trail
