= Sloboda Ukraine =

Historical region in Ukraine and Russia

Sloboda Ukraine Слобідська Україна (Ukrainian) Слободская Украина (Russian)
- Historical region
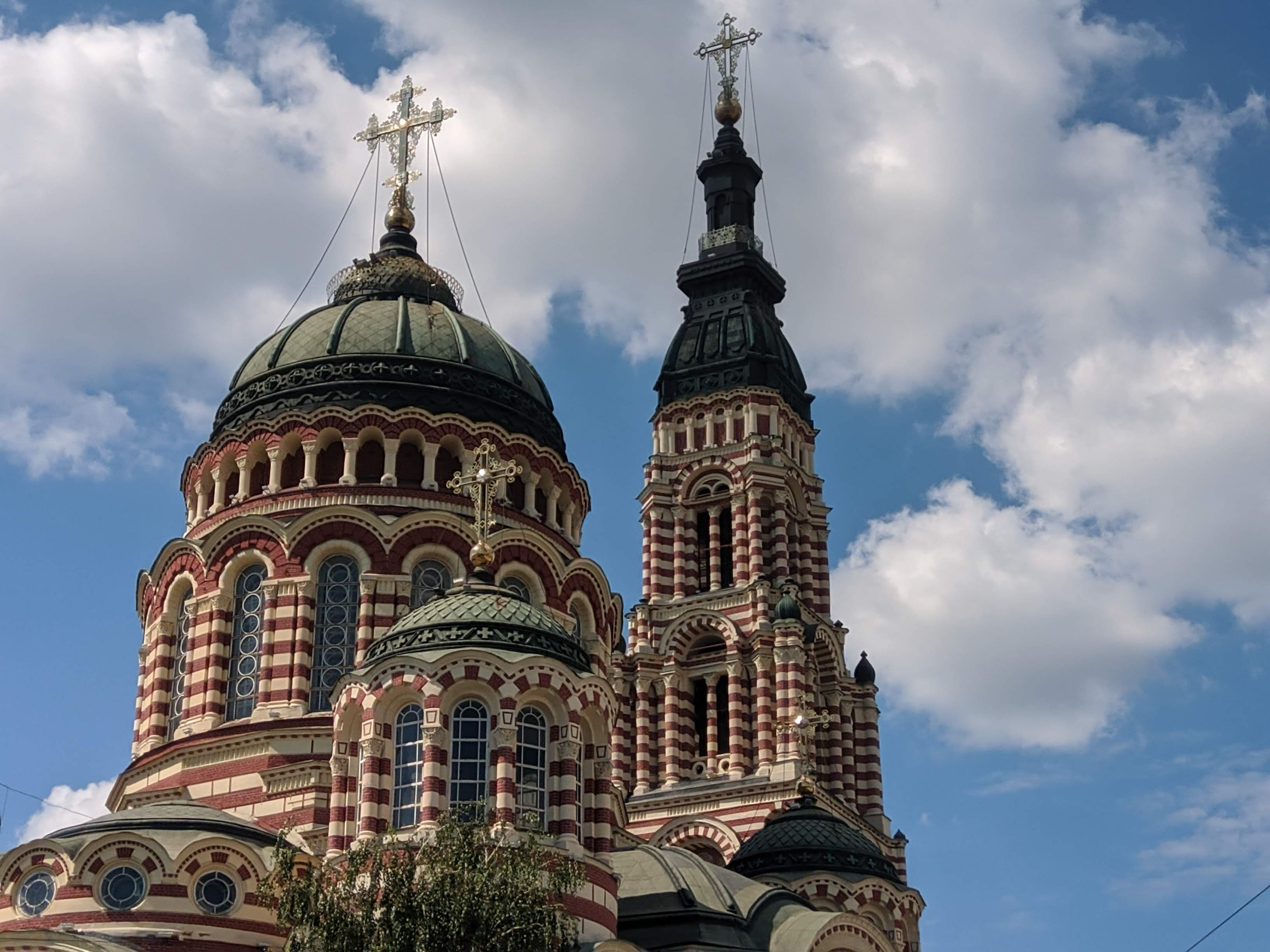
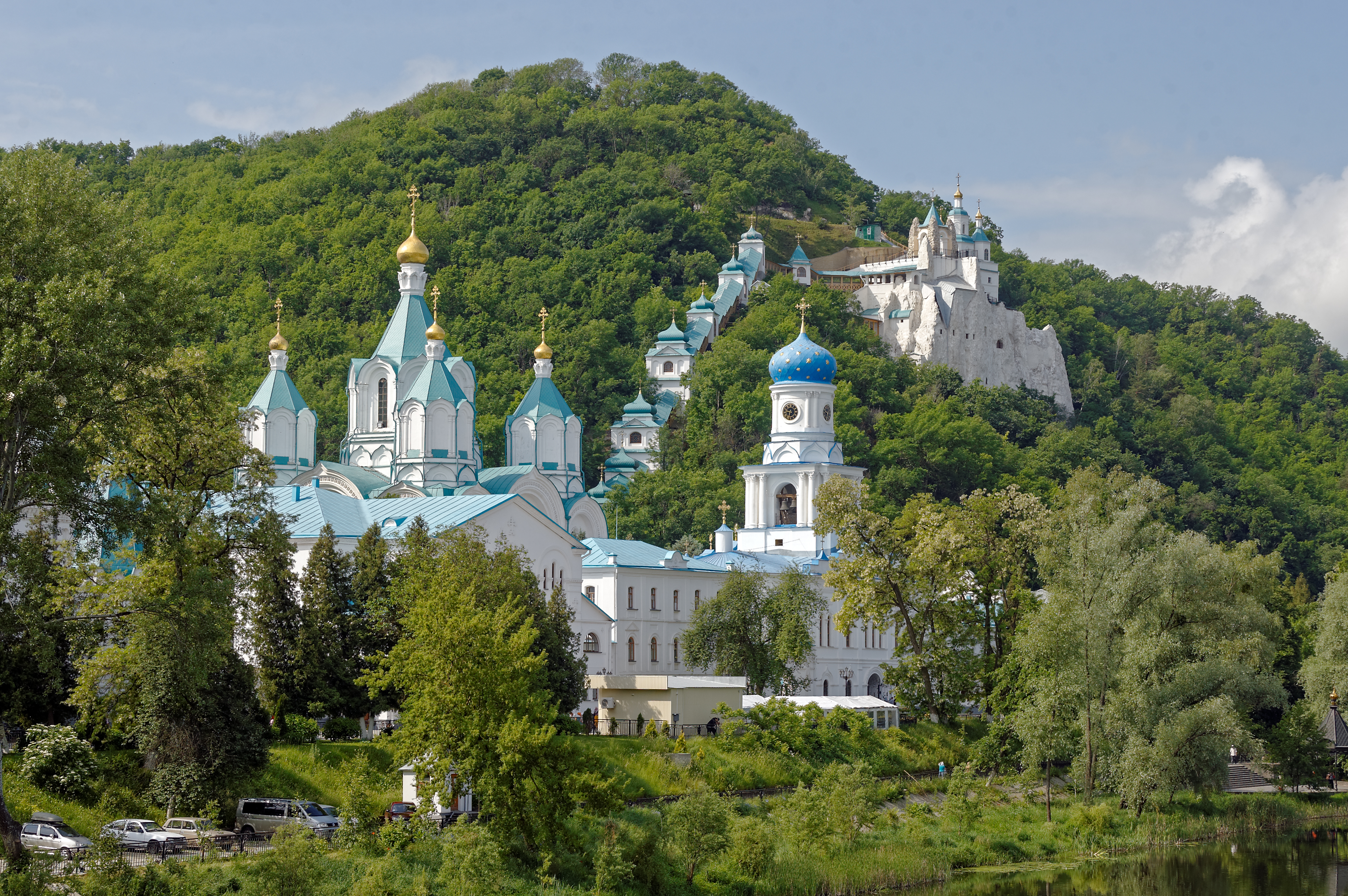
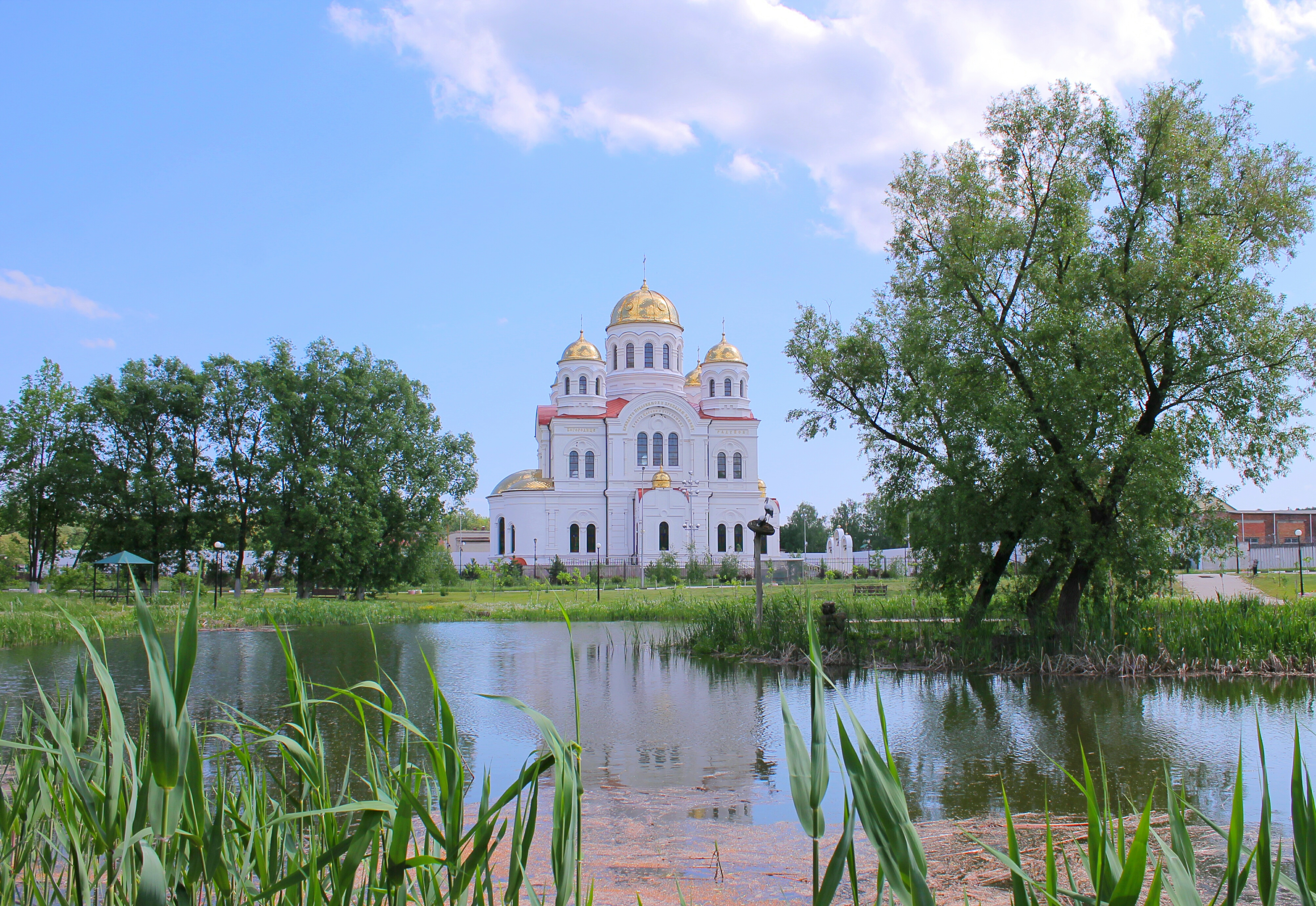
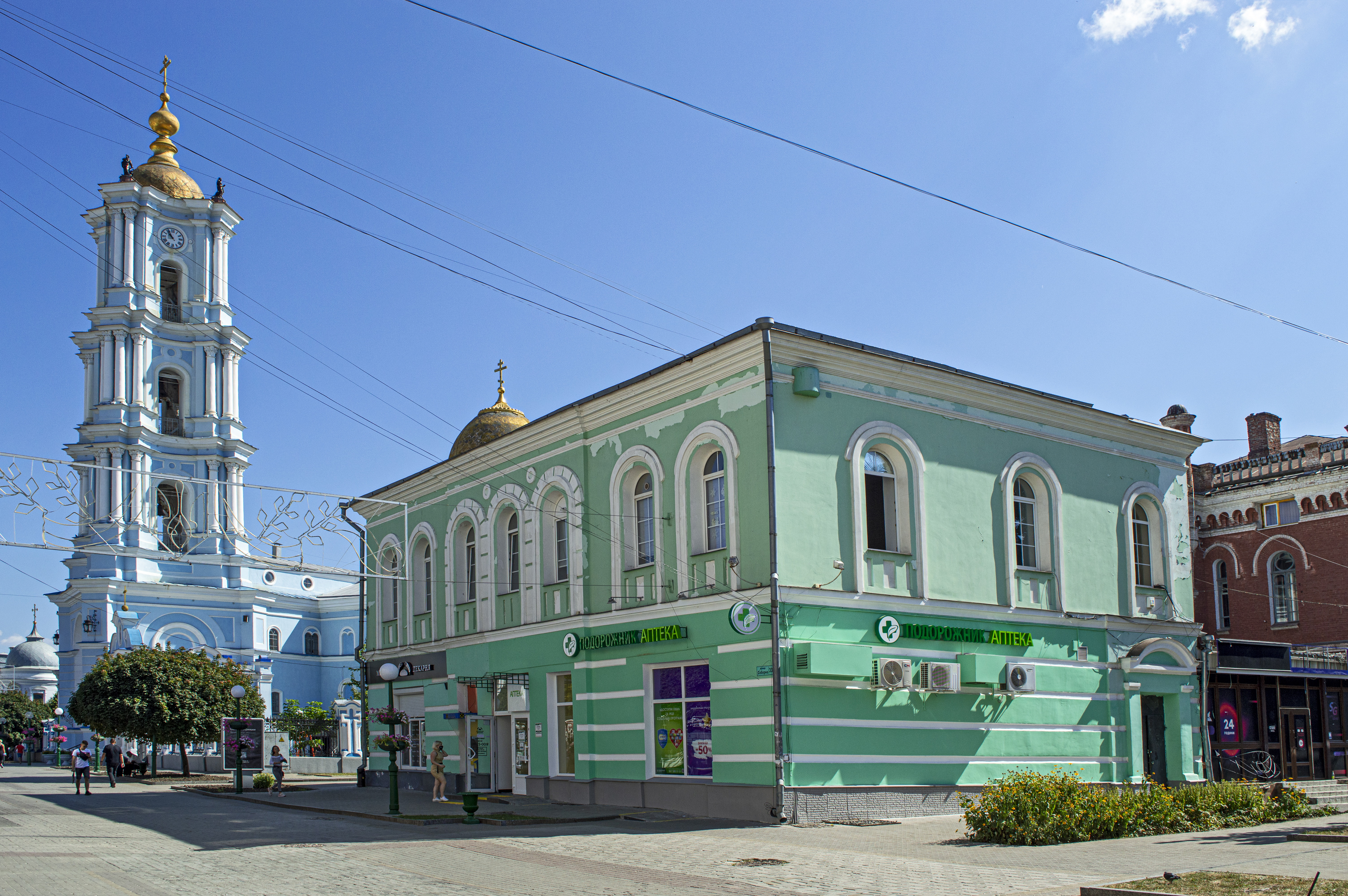
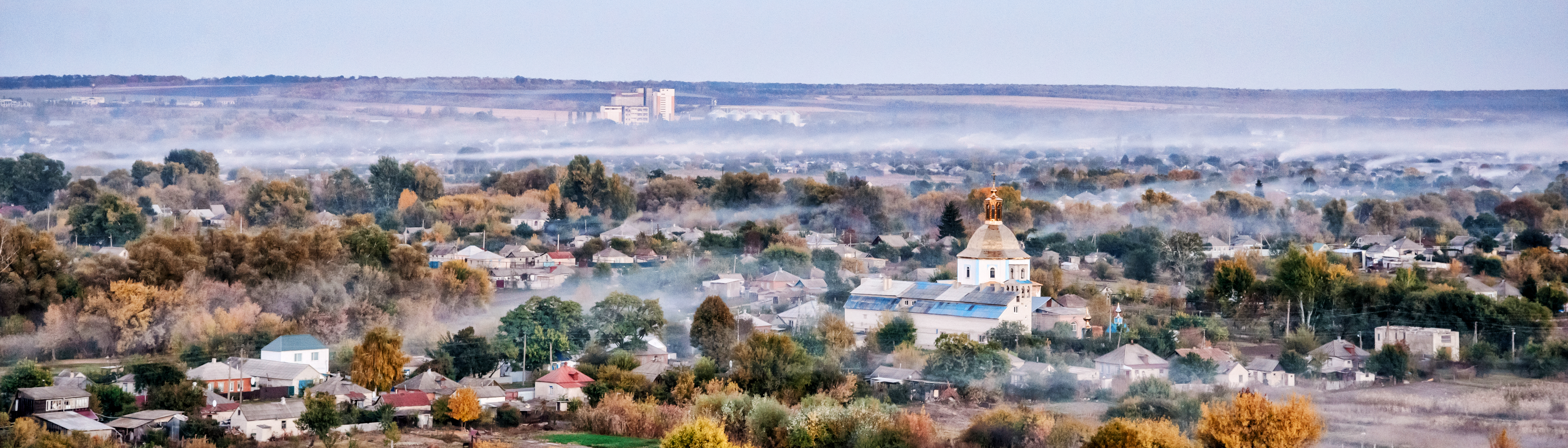
- Annunciation Cathedral, Kharkiv Sviatohirsk Lavra Monastery, Valuyki Historic city hall, Sumy Panorama of Svatove

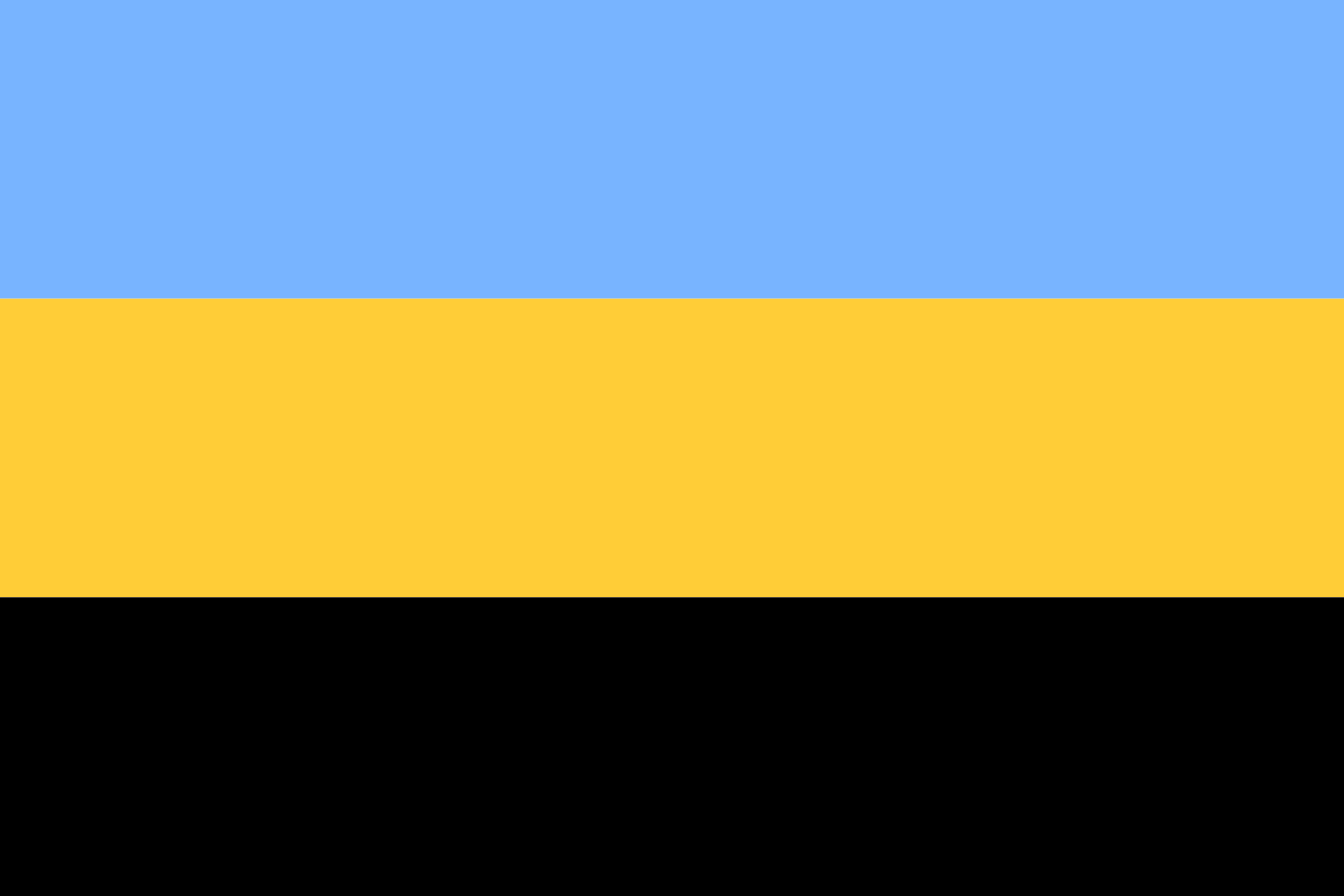
- Flag

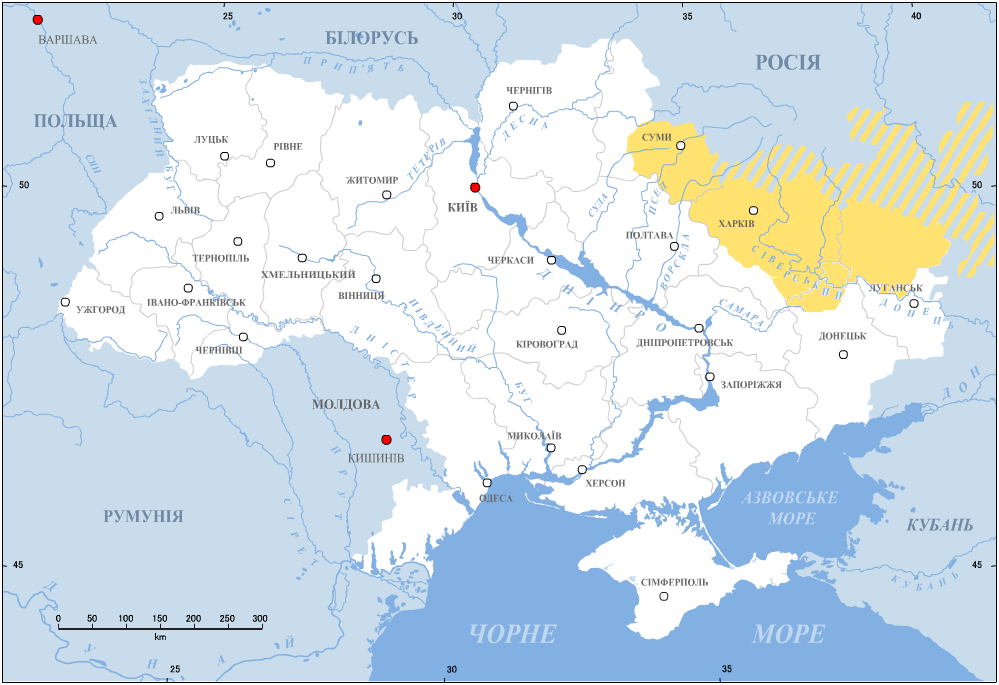
- Location of Sloboda Ukraine (yellow) in Ukraine
- Country: Ukraine, Russia
- Regions: East Ukraine, Central Black Earth Region
- Capital: Kharkiv
- Parts: Kharkiv Oblast, Luhansk Oblast, Sumy Oblast, Belgorod Oblast, Voronezh Oblast, Kursk Oblast, Donetsk Oblast

Sloboda Ukraine, (Note: Ukrainian: Слобідська Україна, romanized: Slobidska Ukraina; Russian: Слободская Украина, romanized: Slobodskaya Ukraina.) also known locally as Slobozhanshchyna or Slobozhanshchina, (Note: Ukrainian: Слобожанщина, IPA: [sloboˈʒɑnʃtʃɪnɐ]; Russian: Слобожанщина, IPA: [sləbɐˈʐanʲɕːɪnə].) is a historical region in northeastern Ukraine and southwestern Russia. It developed from Belgorod Razriad and flourished in the 17th and 18th centuries on the southwestern frontier of the Tsardom of Russia. In 1765, it was converted into the Sloboda Ukraine Governorate.

== Etymology ==
Its name derives from the term sloboda for a colonial settlement free of tax obligations, and the word Ukraine was used to refer to the area inhabited by Ukrainian Cossacks and settlers. The word Ukraine is often considered to originally refer to a 'borderland', a view supported by Russian, Ukrainian, and Western historians such as Orest Subtelny, Paul Magocsi, Omeljan Pritsak, Mykhailo Hrushevskyi, Ivan Ohiyenko, Petro Tolochko, and others. It is supported by the Encyclopedia of Ukraine and the Ukrainian Etymological Dictionary. Some Ukrainian historians claim the original meaning of the word is 'country', 'region' or 'homeland'.

== Geographical extent ==
The territory of historic Sloboda Ukraine corresponds to parts of the present-day Ukrainian oblasts (provinces) of Kharkiv, Sumy, and Luhansk, as well as parts of Belgorod, Kursk, and Voronezh oblasts of Russia.

== History ==
=== Early history ===
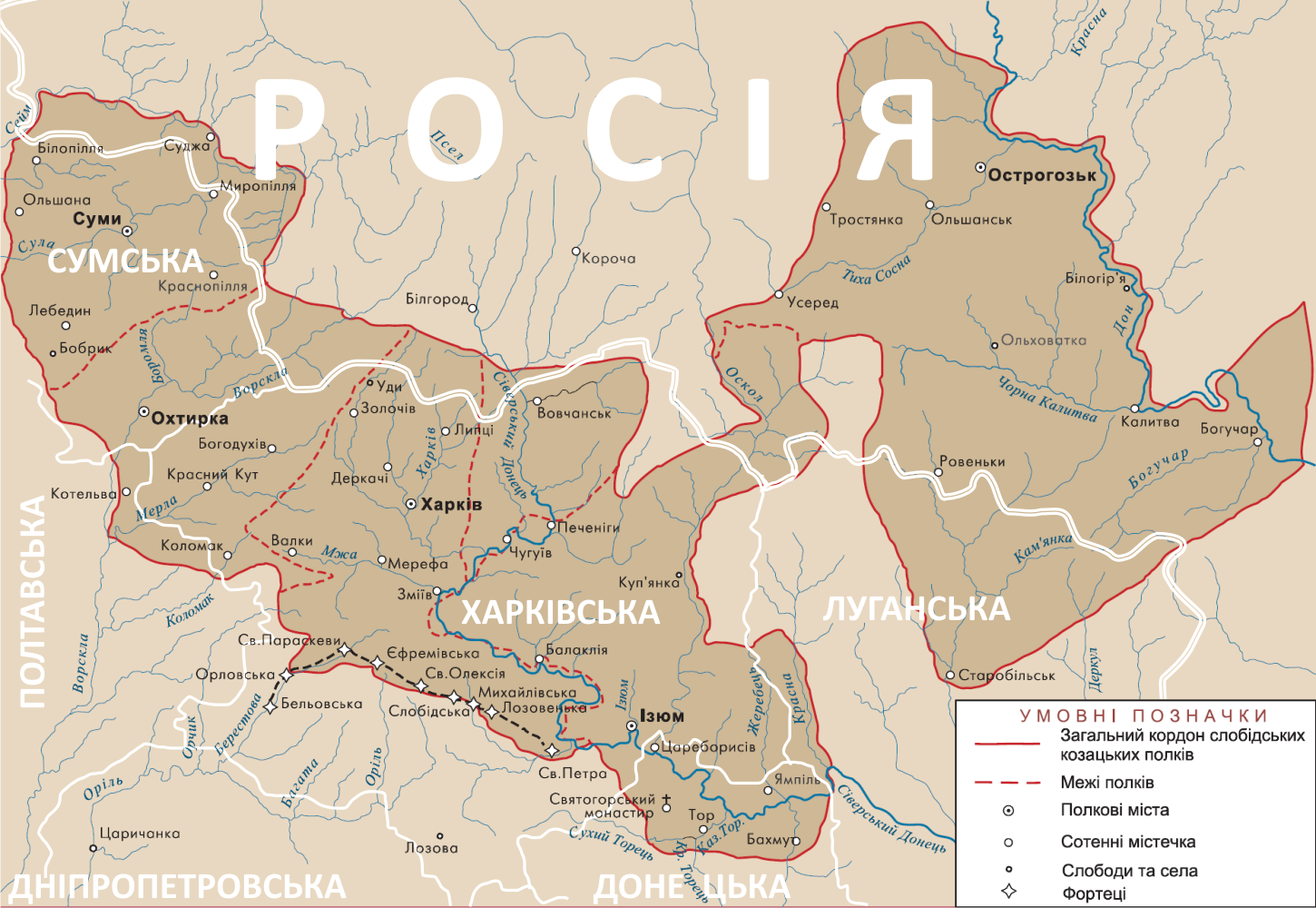
Map of Sloboda Ukraine

Russia gained control over the territory as a result of conquests against the Grand Duchy of Lithuania during the Muscovite–Lithuanian Wars in the 16th century.

According to Russian and Ukrainian sources of the 16th–17th centuries, the region was initially part of the Russian state, which encouraged the settlement of this territory for defensive purposes. It was first colonized by the Russians in the first half of the 16th century and became part of a defense line used against the Crimean–Nogai slave raids. A second wave of colonization occurred in the 1620s to 1630s, largely in the form of Ukrainian Cossack regiments, who were allowed to settle there to help protect the territory against the Tatars.

The Cossacks who arrived in Sloboda Ukraine were under the sovereignty of Russian tsars and their military chancellery, and were registered in Russian military service. Many Ukrainian refugees arrived from Poland-Lithuania after the Ostryanyn uprising of 1637–1638 and received generous resettlement subsidies from the Russian government. For decades, Ukrainian Cossacks crossed the border into southern Russia to gather livestock. Still, many of them engaged in banditry, prompting Russia to establish a new garrison town on the Boguchar River to defend the land from Ukrainian bandits. Russia also resettled many of the Ukrainian refugees at Valuyki, Korocha, Voronezh, and as far as Kozlov.

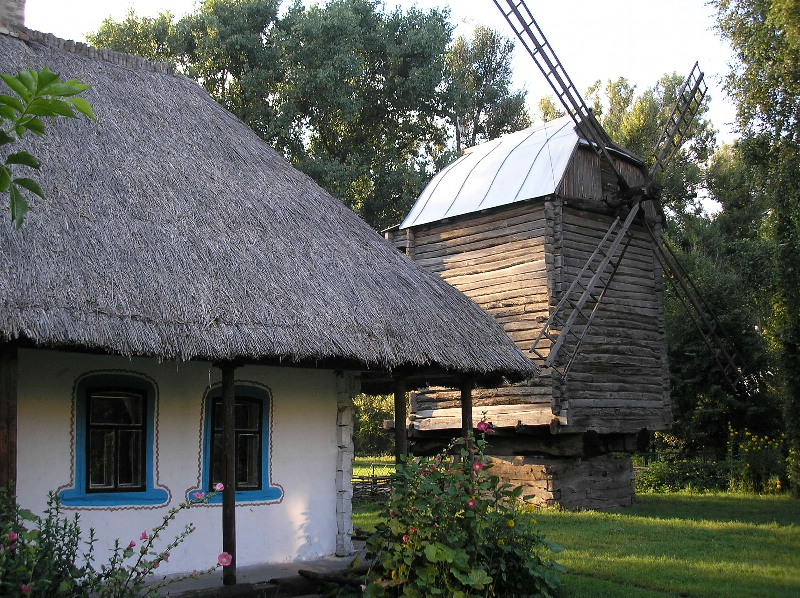
Folk architecture in Sloboda Ukraine

Crimean Tatars and Nogai Tatars traditionally utilized the sparsely inhabited area of the Wild Fields on the border of Russia, immediately south of Severia, to launch annual raids into Russian territories along the Muravsky Trail and Izyum Trail. In 1591, a Tatar raid reached the Moscow region, compelling the Russian government to construct new forts, including Belgorod and Oskol in 1593, Yelets in 1592, Kromy in 1595, Kursk in 1597, and Tsarev-Borisov and Valuyki in 1600. Tsarev-Borisov, named after Tsar Boris I, was the oldest settlement in Sloboda Ukraine.

During those raids, regions near Ryazan and along the Oka River suffered the most. The conflict intensified with Russian territorial expansion south and east into the lands of modern Sloboda Ukraine and the mid-Volga River. Sometime between the 1580s and 1640s, the Belgorod Defense Line was constructed in Sloboda Ukraine, featuring several fortifications, moats, and forts, providing security to the region. After several Russo-Crimean Wars, Russian monarchs began to encourage the settlement of the area by Cossacks, who served as a sort of frontier guard force against Tatar raids.

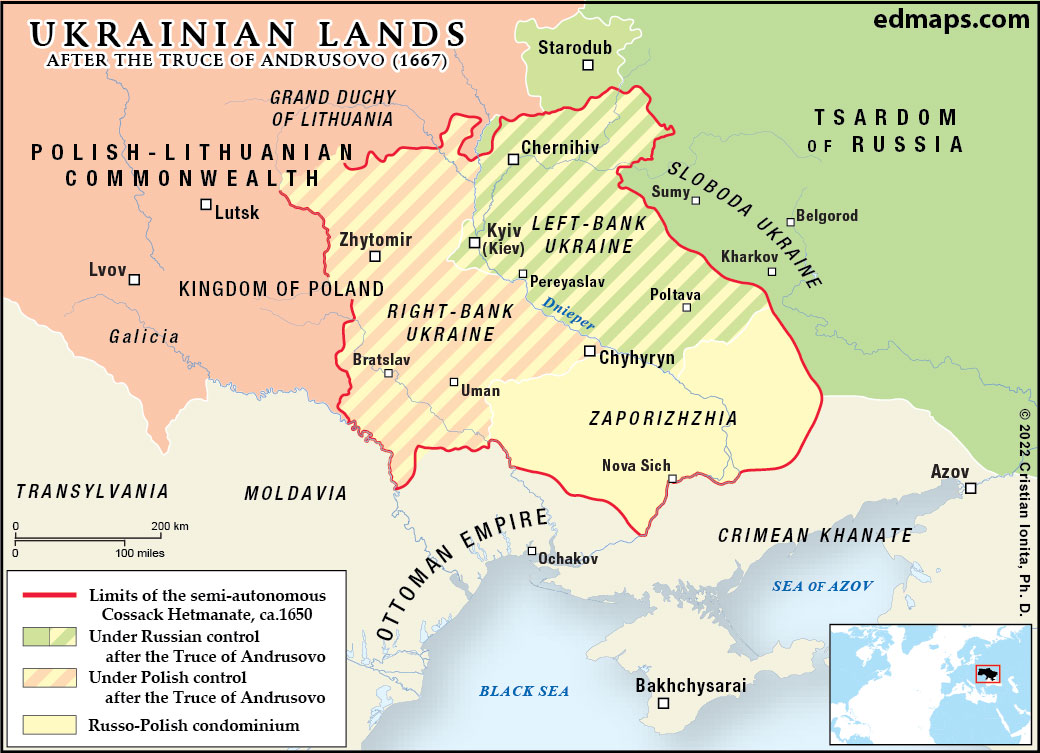
Sloboda Ukraine and the partition of Cossack Hetmanate after the Truce of Andrusovo in 1667

Apart from the Cossacks, the settlers included peasants and townspeople from right-bank and left-bank Ukraine, divided by the Treaty of Andrusovo in 1667. The name Sloboda Ukraine derives from the word sloboda, a Slavic term meaning "freedom" (or "liberty"), and also the name of a type of settlement. The tsar would free the settlers of a sloboda from the obligation of paying taxes and fees for a certain period, which proved very enticing for immigrants. By the end of the 18th century, settlers occupied 523 Slobodan settlements in Sloboda Ukraine.

From 1650 to 1765, the territory referred to as Sloboda Ukraine became increasingly organized according to Cossack military custom, similar to that of the Zaporozhian Host (to the south) and Don Host (to the east). The relocated Cossacks became known as Sloboda Cossacks. There were five regimental districts (polky) of Sloboda Cossacks, named after the towns of their sustained deployment and subdivided into company districts (sotni). Regional centers included Ostrogozhsk (centre of Ostrogozhsk Regiment), Kharkiv (Kharkiv Regiment), Okhtyrka, Sumy, and Izyum, while the Sloboda Ukraine Cossack capital was located in Sumy until 1743. Starting from 1688, administrative control over Sloboda Ukraine belonged to Greater Russian prikaz of the tsar's government. From 1753 to 1764, the imperial territory of Slavo-Serbia existed to the south.

=== Russian Empire ===
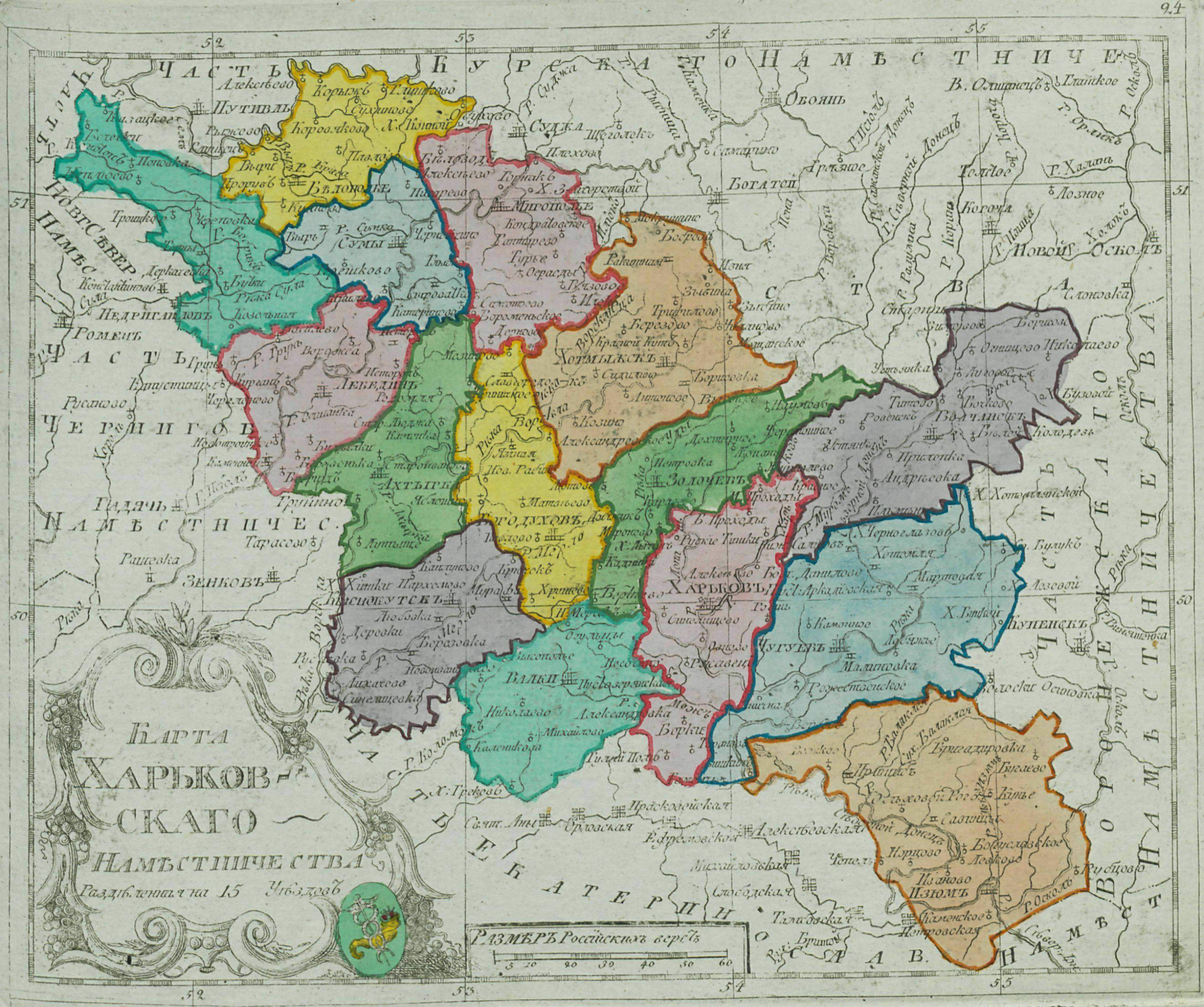
Kharkov Viceroyalty in 1792

The administration of Catherine the Great disbanded the regiments of Slobozhanshchina and abolished Cossack privileges by the decree of July 28, 1765. The semiautonomous region became a province called Sloboda Ukraine Governorate (Slobodsko-Ukrainskaya guberniya). Saint Petersburg replaced the regimental administrations with Russian hussar regiments, and granted Cossack higher ranks (starshinas) officership, and nobility (dvoryanstvo). In 1780, the governorate was transformed into the Kharkov Viceroyalty (namestnichestvo), which existed until the end of 1796 when it was again renamed Sloboda Ukrainian Governorate. Each administrative reform involved territorial changes.

In 1835, the province of Sloboda Ukraine was abolished, ceding most of its territory to the new Kharkov Governorate and some to Voronezh and Kursk, which came under the Little Russian General Governorship of left-bank Ukraine.

=== Soviet era ===
In November-December 1918, Sudzha was the seat of the Provisional Workers' and Peasants' Government of Ukraine, before its relocation to Belgorod outside of Sloboda Ukraine. From 1919 to 1934, Kharkiv was the capital of Soviet Ukraine, before its relocation to Kyiv in Dnieper Ukraine.

After the establishment of the Soviet Union, Sloboda Ukraine was divided between the Ukrainian SSR and the Russian SFSR. In the early 1930s, Ukrainization ended in the parts of Sloboda Ukraine located in the Russian SFSR, leading to a significant decline in the number of people who identified as Ukrainians.

==== World War II ====
During World War II, Polish prisoners-of-war was held in a Soviet POW camp in Starobilsk, and then some 3,900 were mass murdered by the NKVD in Kharkiv and secretly buried in Piatykhatky in 1940 (Katyn massacre). From 1941/1942 to 1943, the region was occupied by Germany. At Drobytsky Yar, German occupiers mass murdered an estimated 16,000 to 30,000 people, mostly Jews. In January 1944, the 1st Reserve Infantry Regiment of the 1st Corps of the Polish Armed Forces was stationed in Sumy, and soon the Main Formation Staff of the First Polish Army was established in Sumy. In 1944, about 30,000 Polish soldiers were stationed and underwent military training in Sumy before rejoining the fight against Germany.

== Cities and towns ==
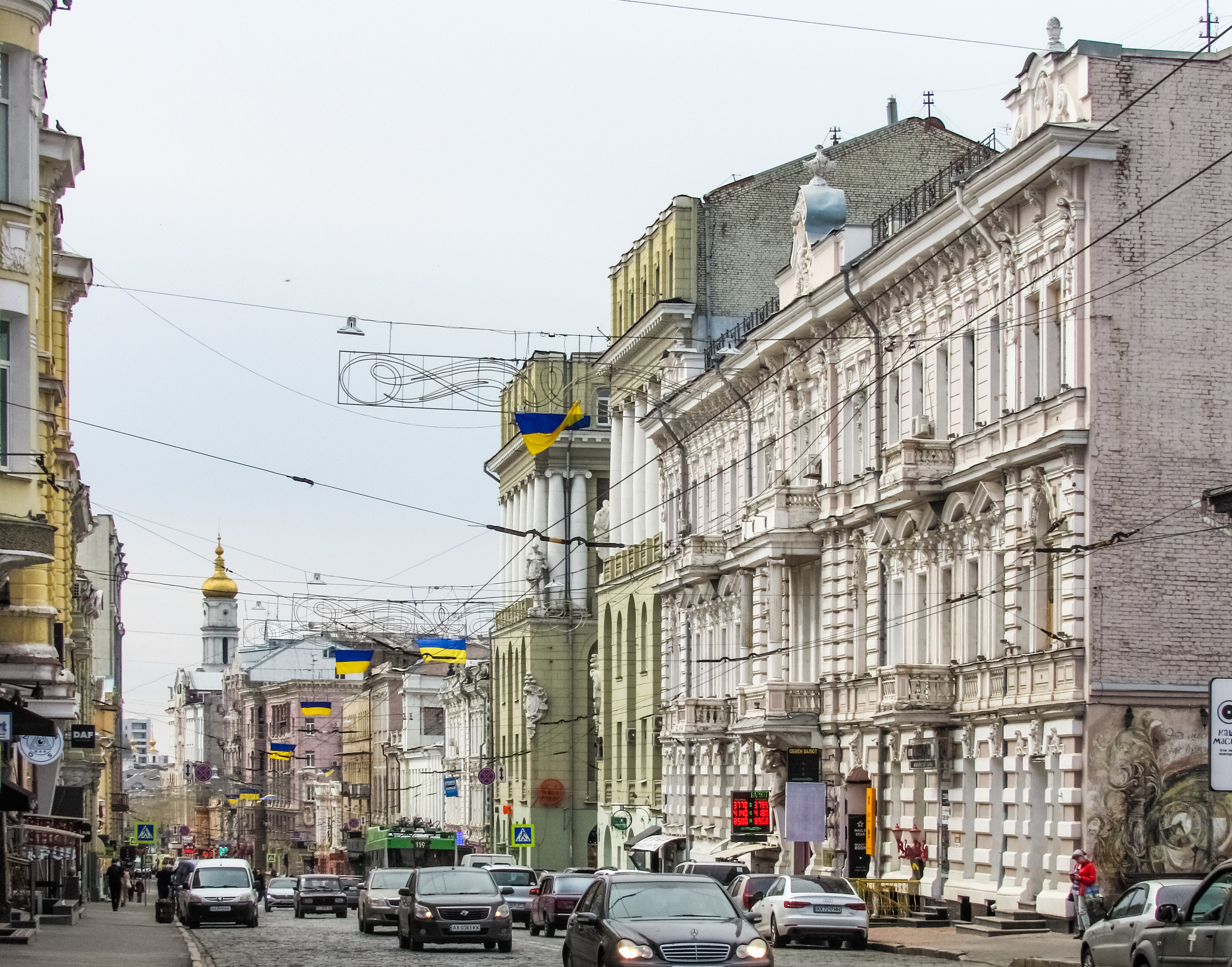
Kharkiv

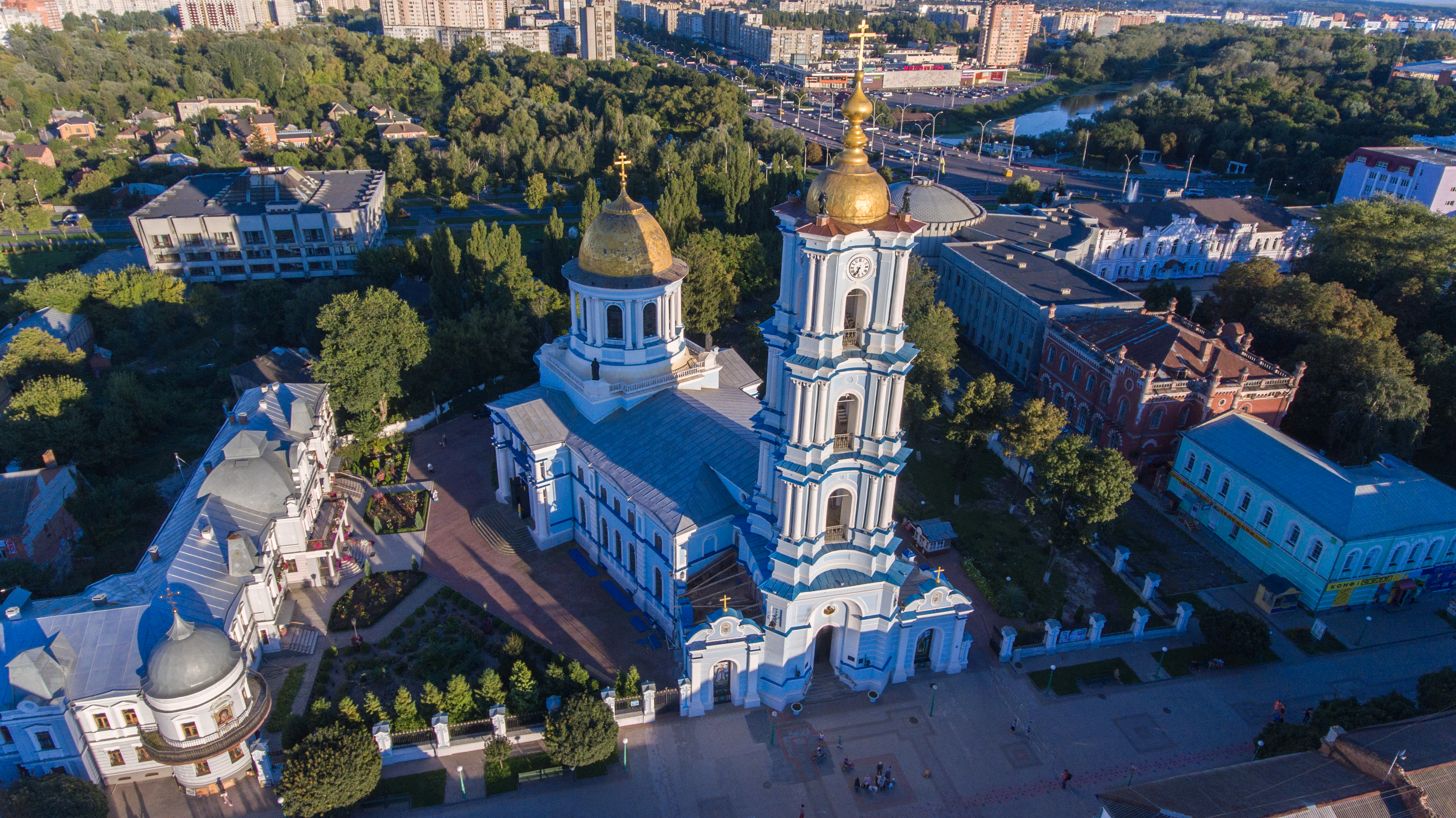
Sumy

Cities and towns in the Ukrainian part:

- Bakhmut
- Balakliia
- Bilopillia
- Bohodukhiv
- Chuhuiv
- Derhachi
- Izium
- Kharkiv
- Kramatorsk
- Kreminna
- Kupiansk
- Lebedyn
- Liubotyn
- Lyman
- Merefa
- Mykolaivka
- Okhtyrka
- Pivdenne
- Siversk
- Slobozhanske
- Sloviansk
- Soledar
- Starobilsk
- Sumy
- Svatove
- Sviatohirsk
- Trostianets
- Valky
- Vorozhba
- Vovchansk
- Zmiiv

Cities and towns in the Russian part:

- Alexeyevka
- Biryuch
- Boguchar
- Grayvoron
- Ostrogozhsk
- Rossosh
- Shebekino
- Sudzha
- Valuyki

== See also ==
- Slobozhan dialect
