= Zaraysk =

Town in Moscow Oblast, Russia

Zaraysk Зарайск
- Town
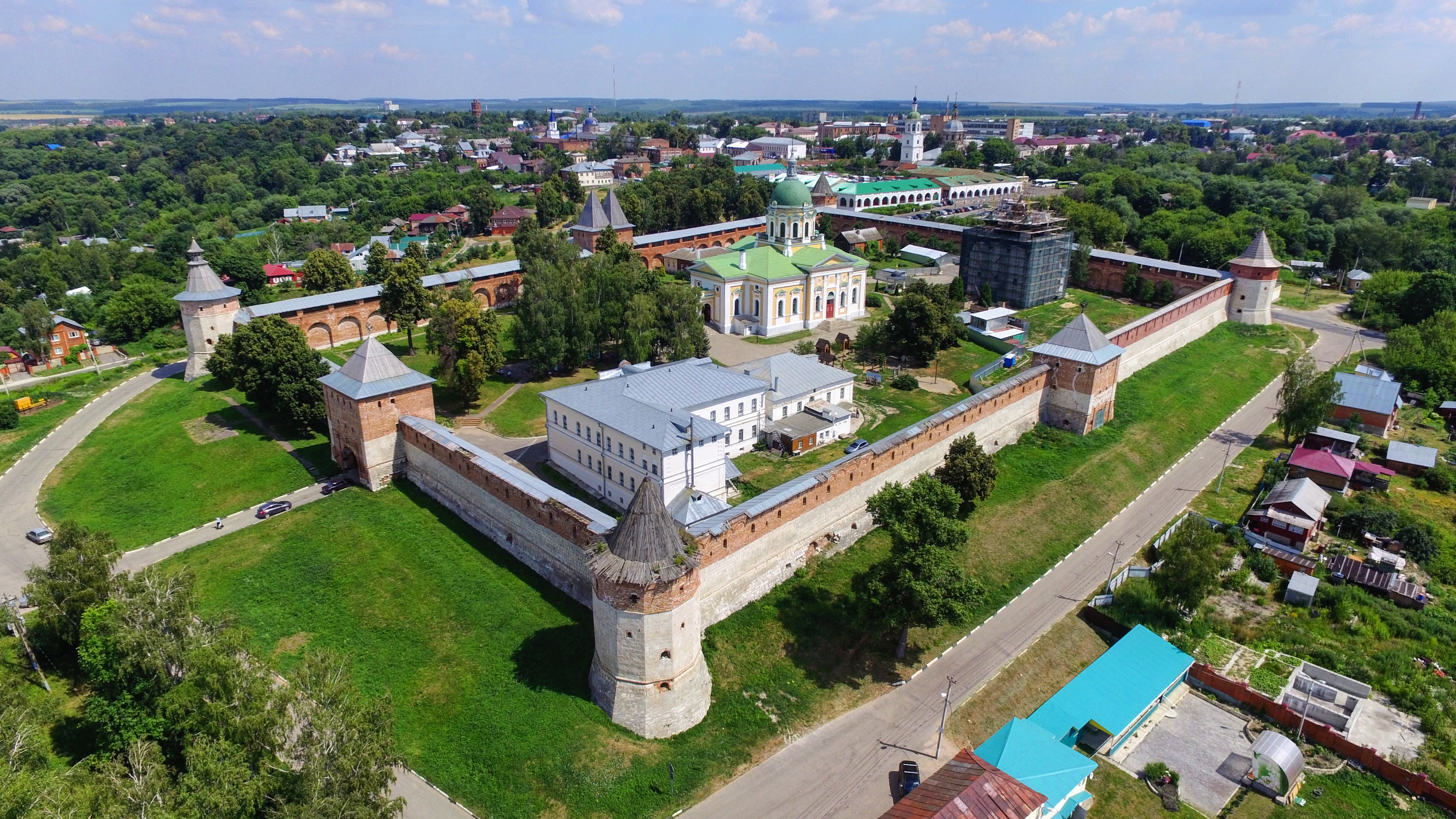
- Zaraysk Kremlin

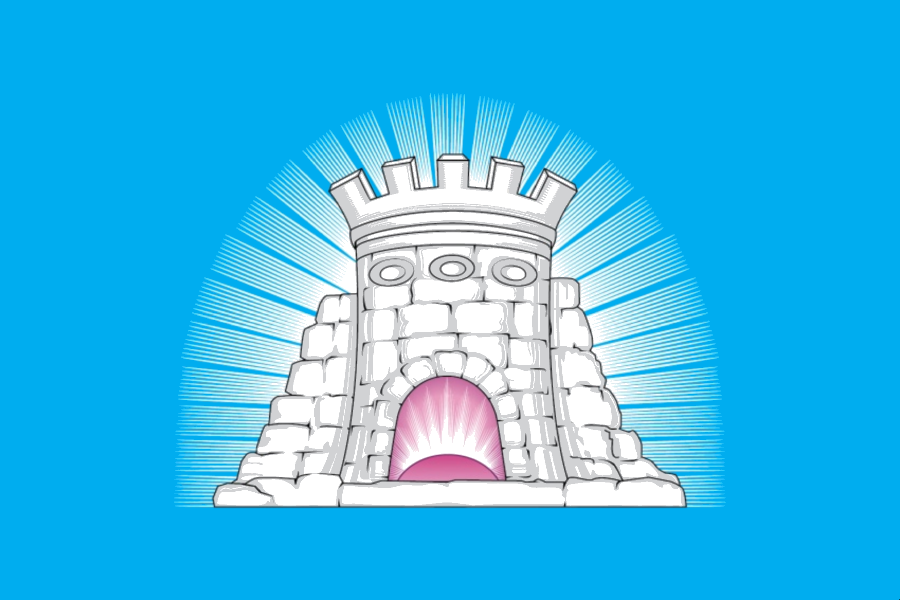
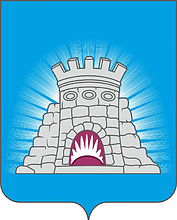
- Flag Coat of arms
- Interactive map of Zaraysk
- Location of Zaraysk Zaraysk (Moscow Oblast)
- Coordinates: 54°46′N 38°53′E
- Country: Russia
- Federal subject: Moscow Oblast
- Administrative district: Zaraysky District
- TownSelsoviet: Zaraysk
- First mentioned: 1146
- Town status since: 1778

Government
  - Body: Council of Deputies

Area
  - Total: 20.5 km^{2} (7.9 sq mi)
- Elevation: 160 m (520 ft)

Population (2010 Census)
  - Total: 24,645
  - Estimate (2025): 20,253 (−17.8%)
  - Density: 1,200/km^{2} (3,110/sq mi)

Administrative status
  - Capital of: Zaraysky District, Town of Zaraysk

Municipal status
  - Municipal district: Zaraysky Municipal District
  - Urban settlement: Zaraysk Urban Settlement
  - Capital of: Zaraysky Municipal District, Zaraysk Urban Settlement
- Time zone: UTC+3 (MSK)
- Postal code: 140600–140603
- Dialing code: +7 49666
- OKTMO ID: 46529000001
- Website: zarrayon.ru

Zaraysk (Russian: Зара́йск) is a town and the administrative center of Zaraysky District in Moscow Oblast, Russia, located about 162 kilometers (101 mi) southeast from Moscow.

== Geography ==
The town stands on the right bank of the Osyotr River, which is a right confluent of the Oka.

== History ==
In the Middle Ages, the town belonged to the Princes of Ryazan and was known as Krasnoye (13th century) and Novogorodok-upon-the-Osyotr (14th and 15th centuries). From 1528 onwards, the town was called "the town of Nikola Zarazsky" and only by the beginning of 17th century it received its present name of Zaraysk. Before the 20th century, the town was a part of Ryazan Governorate and its architecture and vernacular dialect seem closer to Ryazan than to Moscow.

In the Grand Duchy of Moscow, Zaraysk was one of the fortresses forming a part of the Great Abatis Border, a fortified line of felled trees, barricades, fortresses, ditches, which were built by Russians as a protection against the hordes of the Crimean and Kazan Tatars. In 1531, a stone kremlin was built in place of the former wooden citadel. The Tatars failed to take the fortress during their raids in 1533, 1541, and 1570. It was briefly captured by the Lisowczycy during the Time of Troubles.

The brick-and-limestone kremlin in Zaraysk still stands and is kept in a rather good condition. The citadel is very small and has a rectangular shape, with only six towers, two of which are pierced by the gates.

== Administrative and municipal status ==
Within the framework of administrative divisions, Zaraysk serves as the administrative center of Zaraysky District. As an administrative division, it is incorporated within Zaraysky District as the Town of Zaraysk. As a municipal division, the Town of Zaraysk is incorporated within Zaraysky Municipal District as Zaraysk Urban Settlement.

== Economy ==
Zaraysk is an industrial center of the district, with printing, building materials, foodstuff, and footwear industries.

=== Transport ===
There is a bus line from Moscow; the journey time is 2:30 at 2024.

Zaraysk has a freight railway branch from Lukhovitsy to Zaraysk. It was built almost immediately after the construction of the main line through Lukhovitsy, in 1870. Passenger service was closed in 1969. In the 2020s, the line still used for occasional freight trains.

== Sights ==
The main tourist attraction is a traditional Russian citadel known as the Zaraysk Kremlin. There are five churches in Zaraysk, the oldest of which is St. Nicholas Cathedral, consecrated in 1681. The downtown also has a traditional covered market, or Gostiny Dvor.

=== Archaeology ===
Near the Kremlin wall is an Upper Paleolithic site associated with the Gravettian culture. It first attracted attention when a bison figurine dated 22000 BP was found there. By 2008, many other artefacts were found, including:

1. A mammoth's rib with drawings on them which are thought to be the images of three mammoths.
2. A small bone having an ornament of X-shaped patterns on it.
3. Two figurines of humans, presumably of women.
4. A piece with a conical shape made of a mammoth's bone. The upper part of the cone has been cut, it has a hole in the centre and many patterns. The purpose of this object is not known.

== Sister cities ==
- Popovo, Bulgaria
- Arzamas, Russia
