= Izium Trail =

Historic route used by invading armies from Crimea

The Izium Trail or Izium Warpath (Ukrainian: Ізюмський шлях, Russian: Изюмский шлях) was a historic route used by the Crimean Nogays in the 16th and 17th centuries. It branched off the Muravsky Trail at the upper reaches of the Oril river and, after crossing the Seversky Donets at a convenient ford near Izium, continued north along the Oskil river. It allowed the invaders to penetrate into Sloboda Ukraine and then invade Muscovite Russia. In the mid-17th century, the route fell into disuse after the construction of fortifications in the area like the Belgorod line and the Izium line.

== See also ==
- Black Trail
