= Osyotr =

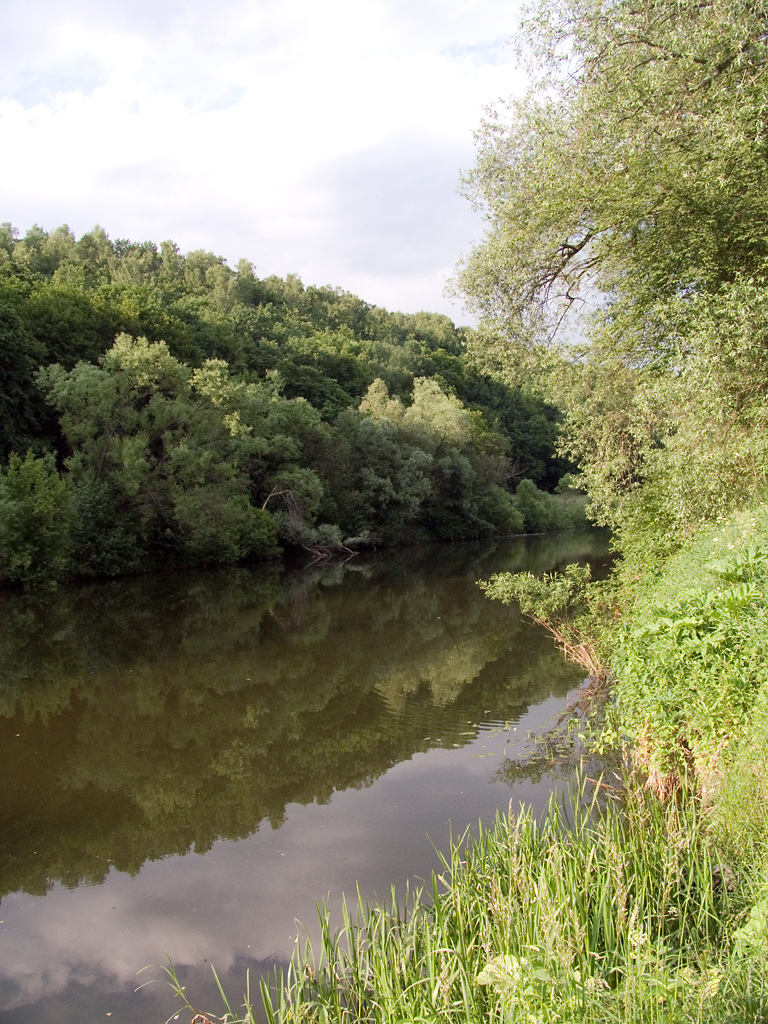
- Native name: Осётр (Russian)

Location
- Country: Russia

Physical characteristics
- Mouth: Oka
  - coordinates: 54.9750°N 38.7739°E
- Length: 228 km (142 mi)
- Basin size: 3,480 km^{2} (1,340 sq mi)

Basin features
- Progression: Oka→ Volga→ Caspian Sea

The Osyotr (Russian: Осётр) is a river in Tula and Moscow Oblasts in Russia, a right tributary of the Oka. The length of the river is 228 kilometres (142 mi). The area of its basin is 3,480 square kilometres (1,340 sq mi). The Osyotr freezes up in November and stays icebound until the first half of April. The town of Zaraysk is located on the Osyotr River.
