= Great Zasechnaya cherta =

Chain of forts in Muscovite Russia

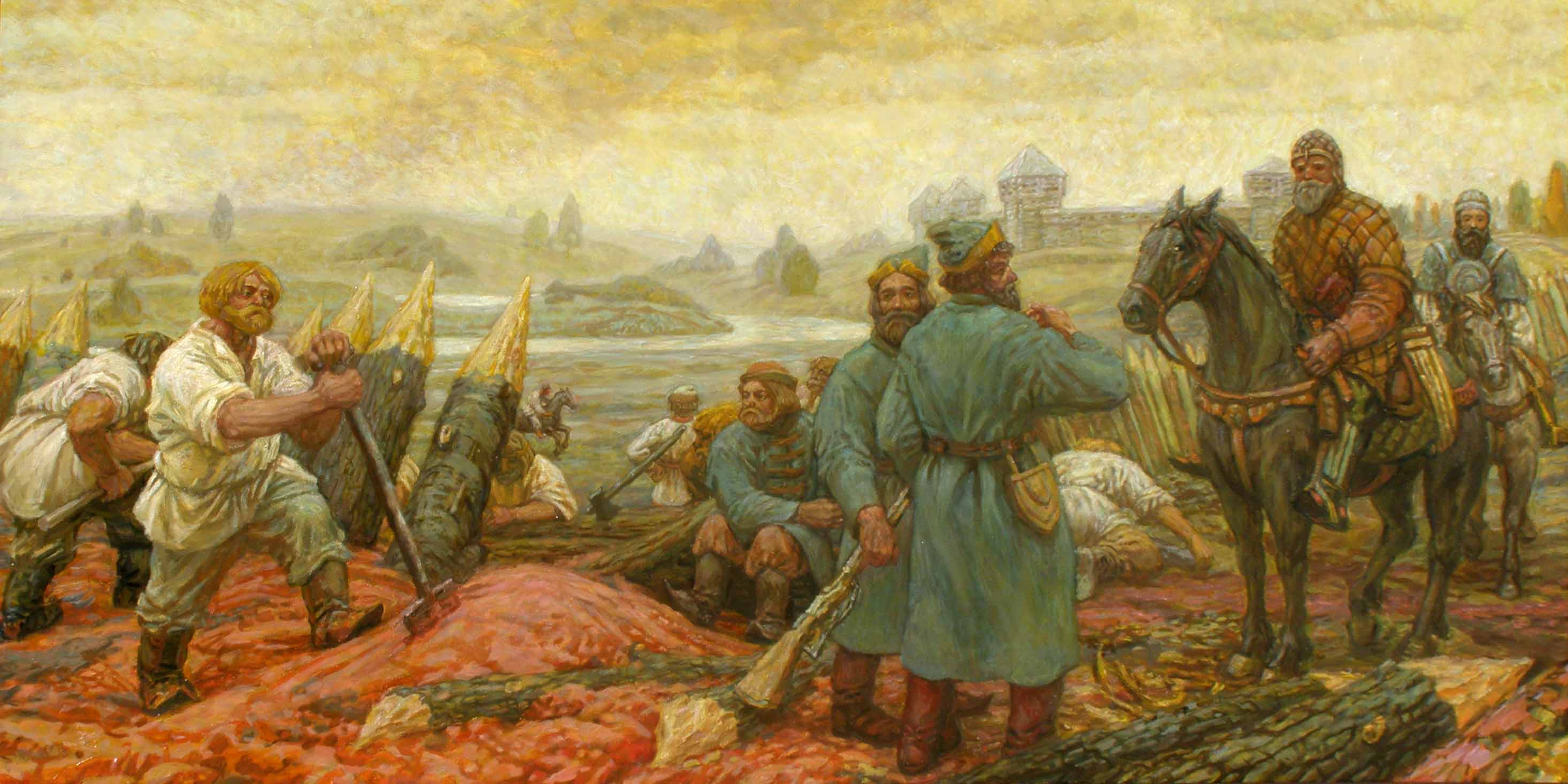
M. Presnyakov. Great Abatis Border. 2010. Oil on canvas.

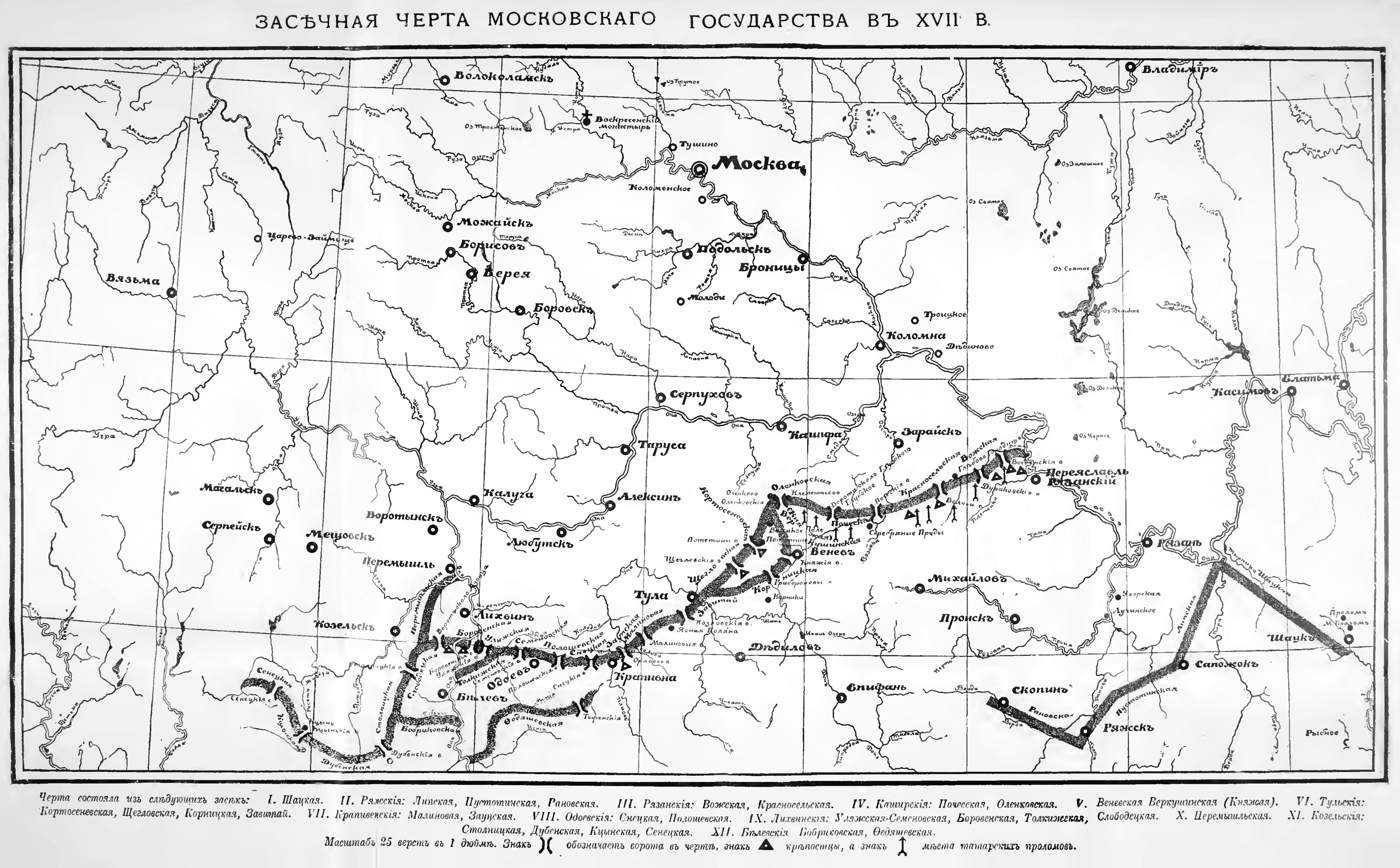
Map of Zasechnaya cherta in 17th century

The Zasechnaya cherta (Russian: Большая засечная черта) was a chain of fortification lines, created by the Grand Duchy of Moscow and later the Tsardom of Russia to protect it from the Crimean-Nogai Raids that ravaged the southern provinces of the country via the Muravsky Trail during the Russo-Crimean Wars. It was south of the original line along the Oka River. It also served as a border between the Muscovite State and the steppe nomads. As a fortification line stretching for hundreds of kilometers, the Great Abatis Border is analogous to the Great Wall of China and the Roman limes.

Abatis is a military term for a field fortification made by cutting down trees. The line was built from the felled trees arranged as a barricade and fortified by ditches and earth mounds, palisades, watch towers and natural features like lakes and swamps. The width of the abatis totalled up to several hundred meters. In the most dangerous places the abatis was doubled, trebled etc., the gates and small wooden fortresses were created to check the passers. Peasants who lived nearby were forbidden to settle or cut wood in the area, but were required by authorities to spend part of their time supporting and renewing the fortifications. In the autumn, large areas of steppegrass beyond the line were burned to deny fodder to raiders.

Stone and wooden kremlins of the towns were also included in the Great Abatis Line. Among these towns were: Serpukhov, Kolomna, Zaraysk, Tula, Ryazan, Belyov. Other fortresses in the line were smaller ostrogs.

== Other Russian fortification lines ==
There were a large number of fortification lines in Russian history and it is difficult to get good information on them. The lines naturally moved south as the Russian state expanded. The earliest reference to abatis fortifications appears to be in a Novgorod chronicle of 1137-1139. Abatis lines began appearing in southern Rus' in the 13th century. The 'Great Abatis Line' extended from Bryansk to Meschera and was nominally completed in 1566. It was guarded by a local militia of about 35,000 in the second half of the 16th century. Another source gives an annual callup of 65,000. Behind the line was a mobile army headquartered in Tula (6,279 men in 1616, 17,005 in 1636).

There are several notable lines. The oldest one (finished by 1563-1566) ran from Nizhniy Novgorod along the Oka River to Kozelsk, and was built by Ivan the Terrible. The next one built, followed the Alatyr - Orel - Novgorod Seversky - Putivl line. Feodor I of Russia had the abatis built on the Livny - Kursk - Voronezh - Belgorod. Simbirsk line about 1640, and continued the Belgorod line from Tambov to Simbirsk on the Volga River. In 1730-31 the Kama line separated Kazan from the Bashkirs. From about 1736 on, a Samara-Orenburg line closed in the Bashkirs from the south.

== See also ==
- Black Sea slave trade
- Crimean–Nogai slave raids in Eastern Europe
- Great Wall of China
- Atlantic Wall
