= Kharkiv Oblast campaign (2024–present) =

Military campaign during the Russo-Ukrainian war

- Part of the eastern front of the Russo-Ukrainian war (2022–present)
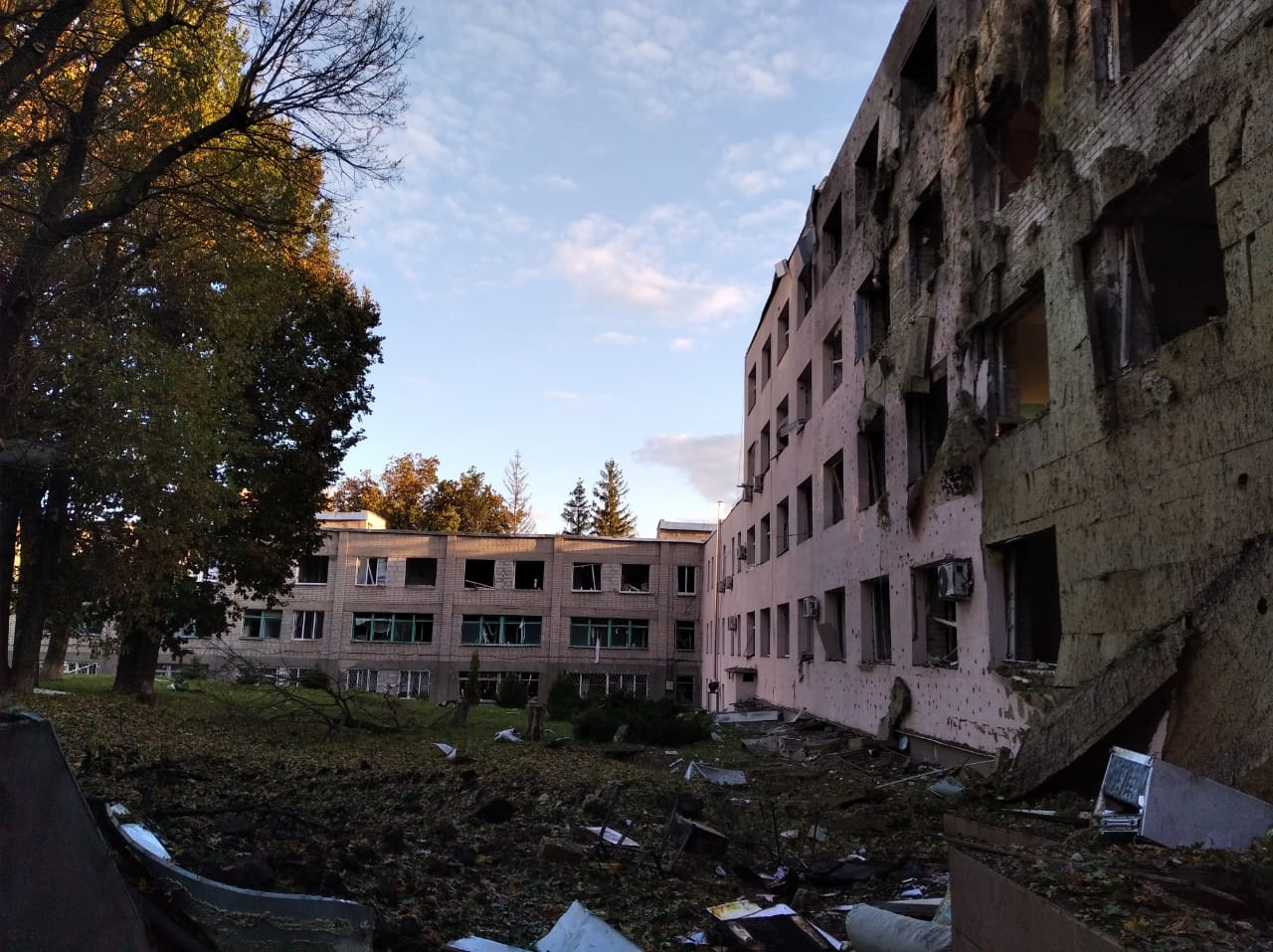
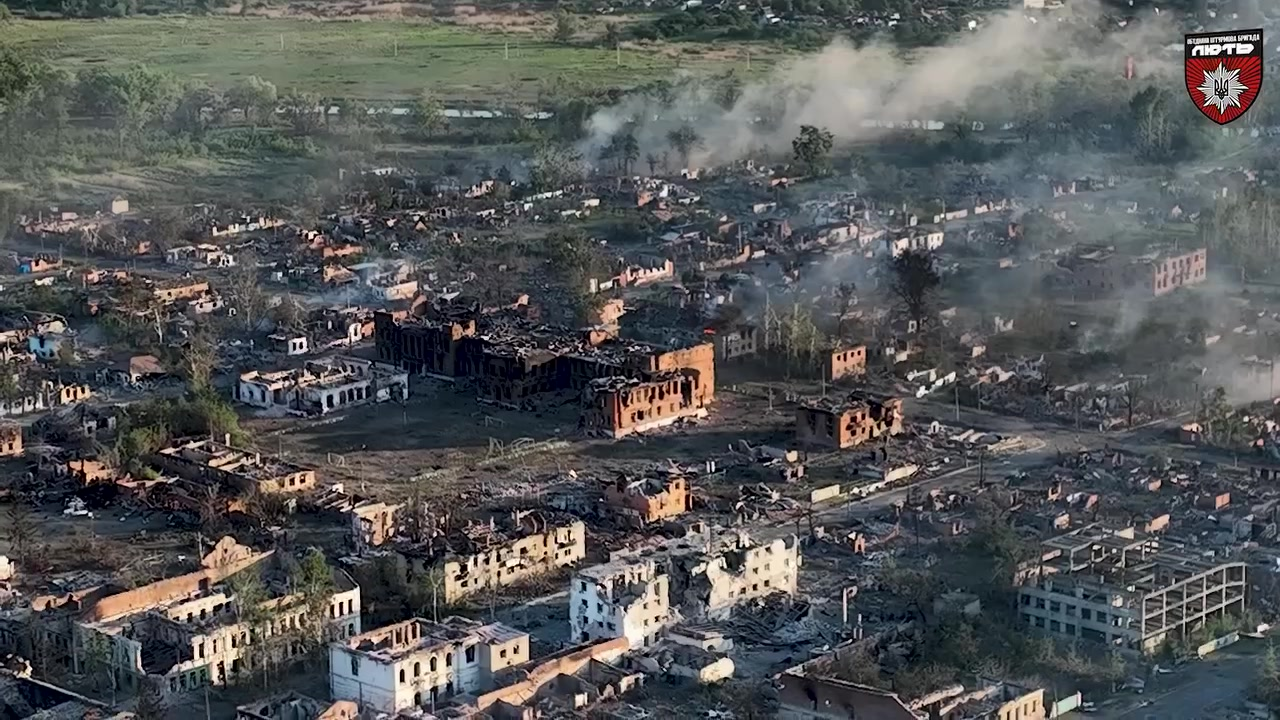
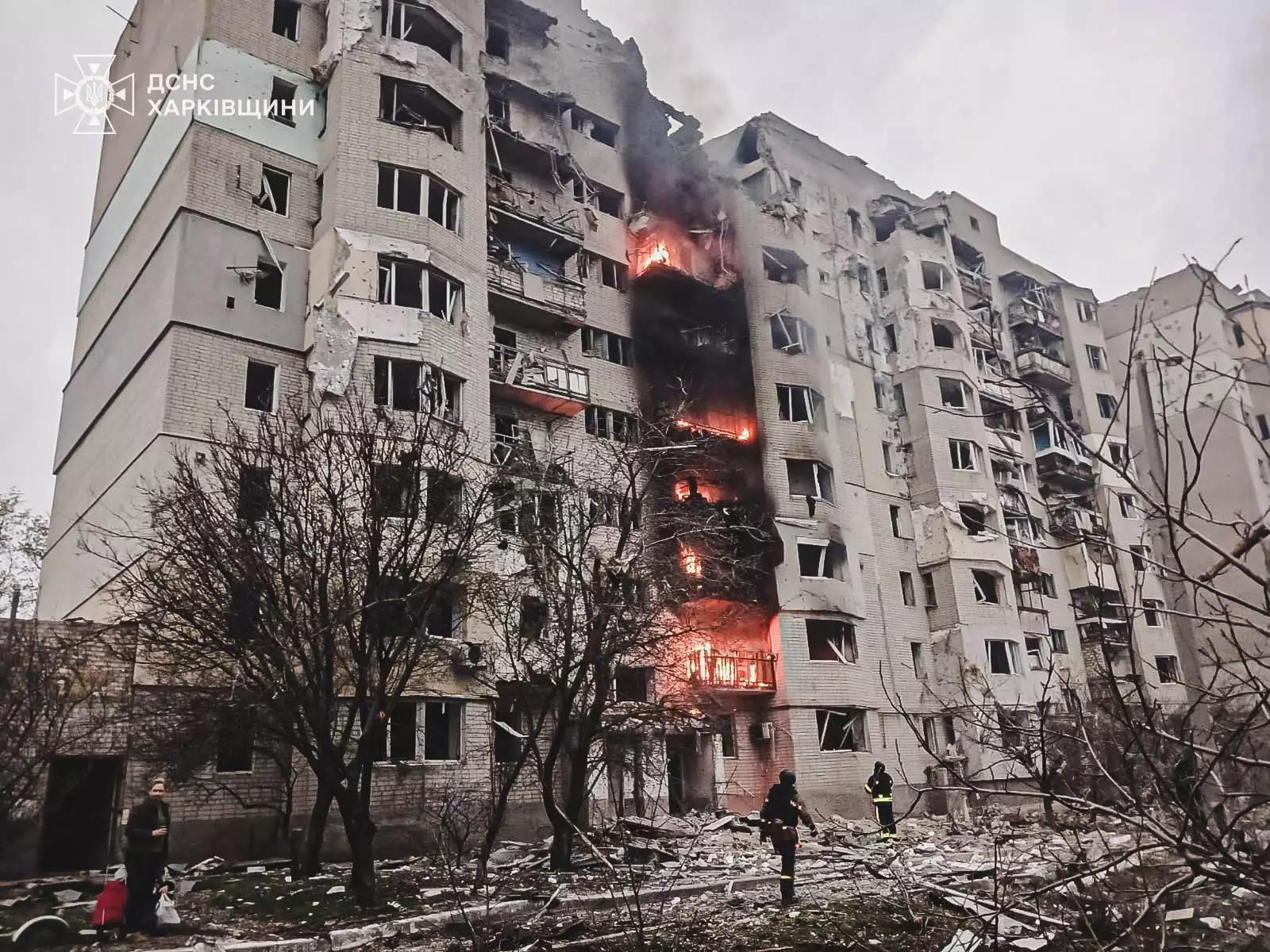
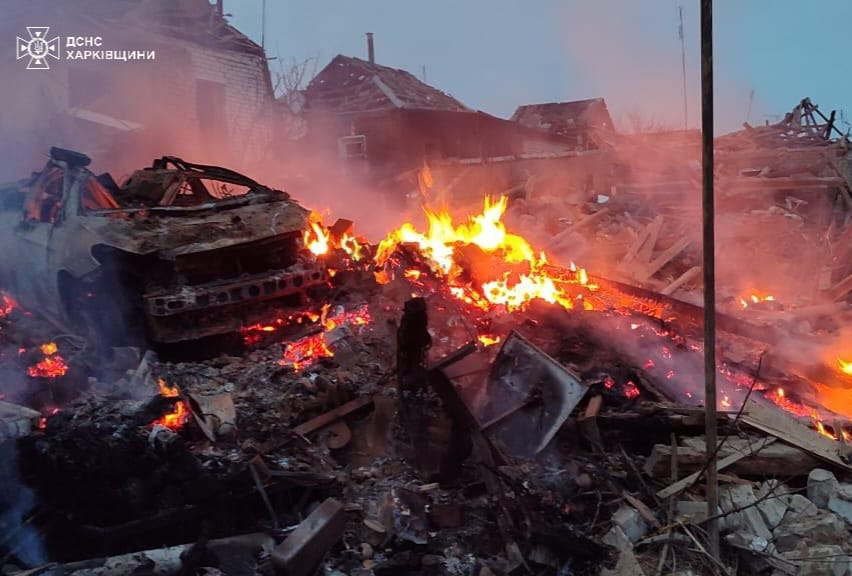
- Clockwise from top left: Central City Hospital after Russian shelling, 3 October 2022; Ruins of Vovchansk after Russian bombing in June 2024; Damage to Vovchansk after Russian strikes with air-dropped bombs on 17 March 2024; Residential building after Russian bombing, 6 April 2025
Date	10 May 2024 – present (2 years, 5 months, 1 week and 3 days)
Location	Kharkiv Oblast, Ukraine
Status	Ongoing
Territorial changes	Russia controls portions of northern and eastern Kharkiv Oblast; Russia claims to have captured Bilyi Kolodyaz, Dvorichna, Vovchansk, and parts of Kupiansk

Belligerents
Russia	Ukraine

Units involved
See order of battle	See order of battle

Strength
Bohodukhiv/Chuhuiv/Kharkiv Raions: 2,000 – 8,000 (initial force per Ukraine) 72,000–75,000 (Northern Group of Forces total strength by August 7 2024 per ISW) 46,000–47,000 (Belgorod Group of Forces total strength by September 29 2024 per ISW); Izium Raion: 10,000 by June 2024	Kupiansk Raion: Several 2,000–person brigades (February 2025); Izium Raion: 2,000 – 5,000 (3rd Assault Brigade strength as of June 2024)

Since 2024, Russian forces have been engaged across several frontlines for control over Kharkiv Oblast as part of the Russo-Ukrainian war. Fighting has primarily taken place within Chuhuiv Raion and Kupiansk Raion, however there has also been engagements in Bohodukhiv Raion, Izium Raion, and Kharkiv Raion.

These operations are reportedly a part of a larger initiative by Russian forces to establish a large "buffer zone" inside of Ukrainian territory, particularly along the international border within Kharkiv Oblast and Sumy Oblast.

== Background ==
In the opening months of the invasion, Russian forces quickly moved through Kharkiv Oblast and captured several cities as part of their wider offensive in the Donbas, including Balakliia, Izium, Kupiansk, and Vovchansk

On 6 September 2022, Ukrainian forces launched a counteroffensive in the Kharkiv region, taking Russian forces by surprise. Following the success of the counteroffensive, Russian forces were only able to hold onto a small portion of territory in the northeastern corner of Kharkiv Oblast, along the Oskil river. In the months after, the frontline in and around Kharkiv Oblast effectively became a stalemate, with little to no movement or advances.

== Campaign ==
Offensive operations resumed in Kharkiv Oblast on 10 May 2024 when Russian forces launched a major cross-border offensive into Kharkiv and Chuhuiv Raions, capturing several towns and settlements, as well as reaching the city of Vovchansk. By the end of the first week, Russian forces had captured roughly 278 square kilometres of territory, their largest gains since 2022.

In November 2024, Russian forces resumed operations along the Oskil river in eastern Kupiansk and Izium Raions. Several attempts were made to infiltrate the city of Kupiansk and to cross the Oskil river in the direction of Dvorichna.

Since 2024, Russian forces have also attempted several smaller cross-border incursions into Kharkiv Oblast, particularly in parts of Bohodukhiv, Chuhuiv, and Kharkiv Raions.

=== Bohodukhiv Raion ===
==== Sotnytskyi Kozachok front ====
In early July 2024, Russian forces crossed the border and infiltrated the settlement of Sotnytskyi Kozachok, with reports of the settlement coming under Russian control by 4 July.

On 12 July, Ukrainian forces launched a counterattack, successfully pushing out Russian forces from the settlement and bringing it back under Ukrainian control.

In late July, Russia began launching sporadic raids from across the border into Sotnytskyi Kozachok, however the Institute for the Study of War (ISW) reported that these raids were short-term and did not indicate Russian control over the settlement. Following these raids, the frontline around Sotnytskyi Kozachok went stagnant, with little to no activity reported by either side.

On 22 December 2025, Russian forces reportedly attempted a new raid on the settlement with unknown success. Following this attack, Sotnytskyi Kozachok effectively became a grey zone on the frontline with neither side maintaining control over it.

As of July 2026, Russian forces claim control over Sotnytskyi Kozachok, whilst Ukrainian forces deny this.

=== Chuhuiv Raion ===
==== Vovchansk front ====
On 10 May 2024, Russian forces crossed the international border into Chuhuiv Raion as part of a multi-pronged offensive into Kharkiv Oblast. Russian forces had success in the opening days of the offensive, capturing several villages and displacing thousands of civilians.

By mid May, Russian forces had reached the city of Vovchansk, with fighting ongoing in the city's northern streets. A Ukrainian official claimed that the offensive was stretching Ukrainian forces thinly across the frontline.

On 19 May, Russian forces reached the Vovcha river in the centre of the city, effectively capturing the northern half of Vovchansk. Russian forces also claimed to have captured the nearby settlements of Starytsia and Zybyne, and claimed to be launching attacks in several directions.

On 21 May, Russian forces reportedly managed to successfully cross the Vovcha river, maintaining a small bridgehead on the southern bank with a small infantry group.

By June, Russian milbloggers began stating that the offensives on Vovchansk and Lyptsi had largely stalled, with Russian forces struggling to advance further due to Ukrainian drones.

In July, a battle for control of the aggregate plant north of the Vovcha River inside of Vovchansk had begun. Russian forces suffered large casualties due to the defensive nature of the frontline in and around the city.

After months of fighting with little to no advances from either side, Russian forces captured the aggregate plant on 24 September.

In early October, Russian forces managed to make further advances over the Vovcha river, capturing several street blocks in southwestern Vovchansk, with Ukrainian forces in the area now fighting in an attempt to prevent Russian forces from completely crossing the river.

By early 2025, it was reported that Vovchansk was completely destroyed, with no civilian population remaining.

On 1 December 2025, the Russian Ministry of Defence announced that Russian forces had captured Vovchansk after one and a half years of fighting. Ukrainian forces denied a full Russian capture, claiming that clearing operations were ongoing and that Ukrainian forces still maintained a small presence in the city.

==== Bilyi Kolodyaz front ====
In early April 2026, following Russia's capture of Vovchansk, Russian forces began advancing southeast of the city towards the critical village of Bilyi Kolodyaz.

In late April, Russian forces captured part of the northern bank of the Vovcha river east of Vovchansk and north of Bilyi Kolodyaz, threatening the village with a Russian advance from the north.

As Russian forces advanced from the eastern and northern directions, the village came under repeated shelling. On 26 May, an aerial attack killed two civilians and injured 24 more.

In mid June, Russian forces advanced further south of the settlement of Pokolyane and consolidated positions in Bochkove, Chaikivka, and Volokhivka. This advance threatened Bilyi Kolodyaz with a southern flanking maneuver.

In July, Russian forces were reported to have begun launching infiltration raids into Bilyi Kolodyaz, with the village and its outskirts becoming a grey zone.

On 12 July Russian forces claimed to have entered the village from the north and have taken up positions in the outskirts.

On 21 July, the Russian Ministry of Defense claimed the capture of the nearby village of Volokhivske, situated northeast of Bilyi Kolodyaz. Russian reconnaissance and sabotage groups were also reported to have begun attempting infiltrations into the western outskirts of Bilyi Kolodyaz.

On 25 July, Russian milbloggers began reporting the capture of Bilyi Kolodyaz with video footage showing Russian flags being raised over the settlement, however Open-source intelligence suggested that the footage was AI generated and that Russian forces did not maintain full control over the settlement.

==== Dihtiarne front ====
On 17 July 2025, the Russian Ministry of Defence announced that Russian forces had captured the settlement of Dihtiarne on the international border following a cross-border attack, however control could not be confirmed at the time.

In early January 2026, Russian forces attempted a major multi-day assault using several small infantry groups in an attempt to expand the frontline surrounding Dihtiarne to the surrounding settlements of Kruhle and Buhruvatka. Ukrainian forces successfully repelled the assault, killing 21 Russian soldiers and injuring 11 more, per State Border Guard Service spokesman Andriy Demchenko.

On 6 February, geolocated footage confirmed that Russian forces had fully captured Dihtiarne and the surrounding area, however extreme cold weather had halted any further Russian advances.

In late July, Ukraine's Joint Forces Task Force spokesperson Viktor Trehubov stated that Russia was using its established foothold in Dihtiarne to launch a new push into the nearby village of Artilne, attempting to advance deeper into Ukrainian territory and towards the settlement of Ivashchyne.

=== Izium Raion ===
==== Borova front ====
At the beginning of April 2025, the Institute for the Study of War assessed that Russian forces, through expanding their bridgehead in Northeast Donetsk Oblast, were creating conditions in preparation to capture the town of Borova.

In early October, Russian forces began launching attacks on the settlements of Bohuslavka and Cherneshchynya, located north and southeast of Borova, respectively.

On 10 October, Russian forces launched a series of attacks around Borova, targeting several settlements. Russian forces reportedly entered southern Zahryzove, located northeast of Borova, and launched several attacks north of Borova toward Bohuslavka, east of Borova near Kopanky, and southeast of Borova near Olhivka. A Ukrainian commander operating around Borova reported that Russian forces had a three-to-one personnel advantage.

On the same day, Ukrainian forces conducted an infiltration operation into Hrekivka, located southeast of Borova, and captured several Russian soldiers.

On 20 November, DeepStateMap reported that Russian forces captured the village of Borivska Andriivka whilst Ukrainian forces advanced towards the settlement of Nova Kruhliakivka, both located north of Borova.

On 8 January 2026, a Russian milblogger stated that Ukrainian forces had advanced towards the settlement Nova Kruhlyakivka whilst Russian forces continued to attack towards Borova from the northeast and southeast near the settlements of Novoyehorivka and Novovodyane.

On 12 and 13 January, Russian forces advanced east of Nova Kruhlyakivka, and claimed to have advanced southeast of Nova Kruhlyakivka, in northern Novoyehorivka, and northeast of Hrekivka, located southeast of Borova. Russian forces also reportedly shelled Ukrainian positions southeast of Kolisnykivka, located northeast of Borova.

On 13 February, Russian forces advanced into eastern Bohuslavka, and continued attacks in the settlements surrounding Borova.

On 14 February, Ukrainian forces launched a counterattack from Krymky, located south of Borova. The next day, a Russian milblogger claimed that Ukrainian forces launched another counterattack near the settlements of Korovii Yar and Oleksandrivka, both south of Borova.

On 16 May, Chief of the General Staff Army General Valery Gerasimov claimed that Russian forces had captured Borova, as well as half of the village of Shyikivka, located southeast of Borova. The ISW reported that there was no evidence to support Gerasimov's claims and that Borova and its surrounding settlements were likely still under Ukrainian control.

On 22 May, Ukrainian forces launched a large-scale mechanized counterattack south of Borova, penetrating up to five kilometres into Russian-held territory and recapturing several settlements in southeastern Kharkiv and northern Donetsk Oblasts, including Andriivka, Ridkodub, Vovchyi Yar, and southwestern Karpivka.

On 1 June, a Ukrainian brigade successfully expelled Russian infiltrators from Novoplatonivka, located north of Borova.

As of mid July, Russian forces were attempting to conduct attacks around Borova but were failing to make any advances.

=== Kharkiv Raion ===
==== Kozacha Lopan front ====
Starting in mid May 2024, Kozacha Lopan was repeatedly shelled by Russian forces during the opening weeks of their offensive on Lyptsi and Vovchansk. The town faced heavy damage until shelling became less common following successful Ukrainian counterattacks on the nearby frontline.

On 19 September 2025, Derhachi Hromada Military Administration Spokesperson Oleksandr Kulik stated that Russian forces had been mining the international border and roads in and around Kozacha Lopan, and had also begun using fibre-optic FPV drones to indiscriminately target civilians in the town, making evacuating any remaining civilians unsafe.

In January 2026, Russian forces successfully crossed the border and managed to infiltrate the settlements of Hraniv, Shevchenka, and Veterynarne, all located near Kozacha Lopan along the border.

In June, Russian forces conducted a successful raid into the northern outskirts of Kozacha Lopan, with Ukrainian forces confirming that fighting was taking place in the town and surrounding settlements.

On 29 June, Derhachi Hromada Military Administration Head Viacheslav Zadorenko confirmed that Russian forces had captured Hraniv, Shevchenka, and Veterynarne following earlier raids, and that heavy fighting was taking place in and around Kozacha Lopan up to two kilometres from the border.

On 1 July, the 425th Separate Assault Regiment Skelia announced that they had successfully expelled Russian forces from Kozacha Lopan after several weeks of clearing operations, and had cleared most of the surrounding border region.

Throughout July, Russian forces continued to infiltrate the border and Kozacha Lopan several times, with Ukrainian forces continuing to repel infiltration attempts into the settlement.

=== Kupiansk Raion ===
==== Dvorichna front ====
On 26 November 2024, following several previous river crossing attempts, Russian milblogger claimed Russian forces had used boats to successfully cross the Oskil River and had entered the town of Dvorichna.

On 27 November, Russian milboggers claimed that Russian forces were also attempting to cross the Oskil near the village of Novomlynsk, and that fighting was ongoing on the outskirts of Dvorichna.

On 29 November, Kharkiv Regional Council member Oleksandr Skoryk confirmed that Russian forces had successfully crossed the Oskil river and that fighting was taking place in Dvorichna, but also stated that Ukrainian forces were successfully defending the town and preventing further Russian advances.

By early December, Russian forces had also crossed the Oskil river south of Dvorichna, taking new positions near the settlements of Masiutivka and Zapadne. Russian milbloggers also claimed that Russian forces had advanced into a forested area west of Masiutivka.

In mid December, Ukrainian military observer Kostyantyn Mashovets stated that Ukrainian forces had retreated to the P-79 Highway following successful Russian attacks and advances in and around Dvorichna.

On 22 January 2025, the Russian Ministry of Defence announced that Russian forces had captured the settlement of Zapadne, following their successful establishment of a four kilometre wide bridgehead over the Oskil river.

On 28 January, the Russian Ministry of Defence announced the capture of Dvorichna. Russian milbloggers claimed that the town's capture solidified the Russian bridgehead over the Oskil river, and opened the way for further advances deeper into Kharkiv Oblast. Ukrainian forces denied that Russian forces had captured Dvorichna until June 2025.

Russian forces continued to advance in the area during February following Dvorichna's capture, using their bridgehead to launch further crossings over the Oskil river, and to mount attacks onto the city of Kupiansk and advance deeper into Kharkiv Oblast towards the town of Velykyi Burluk.

On 17 February, the Russian Ministry of Defence claimed that Russian forces had captured Fyholivka following an advance from Dvorichna.

On 24 February, Russian forces claimed to have captured the border settlement of Topoli following a cross border raid and river crossing.

On 28 March, the Russian Ministry of Defence claimed that Russian forces had captured the settlement of Krasne Pershe.

On 28 April, Russian forces captured the village of Kamianka following a successful river crossing, effectively giving Russian forces territorial control across the entire western bank of the Oskil river north of Kupiansk.

==== Velykyi Burluk front ====
On 3 July 2025, Russian forces launched a small cross-border offensive, capturing the settlement of Milove and the surrounding hills northeast of Velykyi Burluk.

Throughout September, Russian forces advanced east and directly south of Milove, advancing in the direction of the settlements of Ambarne, Odradne, and Khatnie. During September, Russian forces claimed to have captured Ambarne, however the ISW could not confirm Russian control.

On 6 October, the Russian Ministry of Defence announced the capture of Odradne, however geolocated footage could only confirm Russian control over the northern part of the settlement. A Russian milblogger also claimed that Russian forces were advancing southwest of Odradne, towards Khatnie and Velykyi Burluk.

On 19 October, Russian forces claimed to have advanced around Ambarne and Odradne, and had launched attacks in the area east of Velykyi Burluk towards the settlements of Bolohivka and Dvorichanske.

On 10 November, Russian forces advanced 500 metres south of Odradne towards Khatnie, as well as towards Dvorichansk and the settlement of Stroivka.

Following intense clashes, the Russian Ministry of Defence announced the capture of Dvorichansk on 17 November, whilst Ukrainian forces reportedly launched counterattacks with unknown success.

In early February 2026, the Russian Ministry of Defence claimed that Russian forces had captured Chuhunivka, located northeast of Velykyi Burluk.

On 7 April, Russian forces shelled Velykyi Burluk with artillery, destroying the Donets-Zakharzhevsky estate, a 19th century historic building.

In mid May, Ukrainian forces launched a counterattack, recapturing Odradne and pushing Russian forces back towards the border.

On 22 July, Russian forces claimed that they had captured the settlement of Artilne.

On 29 July, Russian forces launched a mechanized assault north of Velykyi Burluk. Geolocated footage confirmed that Russian forces also captured the settlement of Ivashkyne. Russian forces also claimed to have recaptured Odradne. A Russian milblogger also stated that Russian forces are attempting to connect the frontline near Velykyi Burluk to the frontline near Bilyi Kolodyaz in an attempt to encircle Ukrainian forces.

== Analysis ==
As of July 2026, several analysts, including the Institute for the Study of War (ISW), have assessed that these operations are a part of a larger main effort by the Russian government to establish a "buffer zone" within Ukrainian territory along the international border, as well as to bring Russian forces within artillery range of Kharkiv city. The ISW has also assessed that the objective of Russian operations in the eastern parts of Kharkiv Oblast around the Oskil river are to cross the Oskil river and push into eastern Kharkiv Oblast and northern Donetsk Oblast.

== See also ==
- Kupiansk offensive
- 2024 northern Kharkiv offensive
- Russian occupation of Kharkiv Oblast
