= Lyman Pershyi, Kharkiv Oblast =

Village in Kharkiv Oblast, Ukraine

Lyman Pershyi Лиман Перший
- Village
- Interactive map of Lyman Pershyi
- Location within Kharkiv Oblast Location within Ukraine
- Coordinates: 49°47′28″N 37°42′23″E
- Country: Ukraine
- Oblast: Kharkiv Oblast
- Raion: Kupiansk Raion
- Hromada: Dvorichna settlement hromada
- Founded: 1922

Area
  - Total: 1.012 km^{2} (0.391 sq mi)
- Elevation: 91 m (299 ft)

Population (2001 census)
  - Total: 280
  - Density: 280/km^{2} (720/sq mi)
- Time zone: UTC+2 (EET)
  - Summer (DST): UTC+3 (EEST)
- Postal code: 62733
- Area code: +380 5750
- KOATUU code: 6321883502
- KATOTTH code: UA63080050220049198

Lyman Pershyi (Ukrainian: Лиман Перший, Russian: Лиман Первый, romanized: Liman Pervyj) is a village in Kupiansk Raion, Kharkiv Oblast, Ukraine. During the first days of the Russian invasion of Ukraine, the village was captured by Russian forces in their initial advance into the nation. The village for a short time returned to Ukrainian control after their successful 2022 Kharkiv counteroffensive in September, but a localized Russian offensive later recaptured the village.

Since then, the village has been used as a staging ground for Russian offensives on the village of Synkivka to the south, as part of the larger effort to recapture the city of Kupiansk. Since August 2023, Russian assaults have more significantly picked up in quantity, while Ukrainian counterattacks reportedly also continued.

== Geography ==
The village is located on the left banks of the Oskil river 2 km (1.2 mi) away and Vilshana river 1 km (0.62 mi). It is surrounded by a pine forest and several lakes, including Lake Vykline and Lake Karichkivskyi Liman. The Movchanove station is the closest railway station to the village, connecting it to the larger rail lines nearby.

== History ==
According to the 2001 Ukrainian census, the village had a population of 280 people.

On 12 June 2020; Decree No. 725-r of the Cabinet of Ministers of Ukraine placed the village in the administration of Dvorichna settlement hromada, and on 17 July it became part of the Kupiansk Raion as a result of administrative-territorial reform which abolished Dvorichna Raion.

=== Russian invasion of Ukraine ===
At the beginning of the Russian invasion of Ukraine, Lyman Pershyi was occupied by Russian troops in their initial advance into Ukraine in February 2022. The village was retaken during the successful 2022 Kharkiv counteroffensive sometime between 27 September and 1 October by Ukraine, in which Ukrainian forces made a bridgehead past the Oskil river north of the village to as far as Tavilzhanka, and moved south. This advance was supported by a report by the General Staff of the Ukrainian Armed Forces, which claimed they had held back a Russian assault on the village on 25 December.

The village was reportedly reentered by Russia around 16 February 2023. Artillery and mortar strikes by Russian and Ukrainian forces reportedly took place on the village on through the end of February, in March, April, May, and June.

In July, Russian forces gained greater control of the village's outskirts after reportedly capturing Movchanove station on 19 July, which continued to be claimed on 21 July. Russian sources claimed that Russia was using their stronger position in the village to begin attacking south towards Synkivka, in the general direction of Kupiansk. Russian sources claimed that Ukrainian counterattacks continued until early August, and that these were repelled.

Since August 2023, Russian forces have continued efforts to capture positions around, mainly south, of the settlement: with significant assaults reportedly being made in October, November, and December, while unsuccessful Ukrainian counterattacks reportedly continued. Elements of the Russian 25th and 138th Separate Guards Motor Rifle Brigades were involved in attacks from the village, at least in November 2023.

== Demographics ==
As of the 2001 Ukrainian census, the Lyman Pershyi had a population of 280 inhabitants. The linguistic composition was as follows:

Native languages in Lyman Pershyi
	percent
Ukrainian	84.6%
Russian	15.0%
Belarusian	0.4%
others	0.0%

== See also ==
Nearby settlements

- Synkivka
- Vilshana
- Masiutivka
- Horobivka
