= Kupiansk offensive =

2025 campaign in Russo-Ukrainian war

- Part of the Kharkiv Oblast campaign (2024–present) of the Russo-Ukrainian war (2022–present)
- The hospital in Shevchenkove, Kupiansk Raion, after a Russian drone attack in March 2026
| Date | 28 November 2024 – present (1 year, 10 months, 3 weeks and 5 days) |
| Location | Around Kupiansk and the Oskil river, Kharkiv Oblast |
| Status | Ongoing |
| Territorial changes | Russian forces establish bridgeheads across the Oskil river, and capture Dvorichna |

Belligerents
| Russia | Ukraine |

Units involved
| Order of battle | Order of battle |

Strength
| | Several 2,000-person brigades (February 2025) |

The Kupiansk offensive refers to a series of military engagements in the Russo-Ukrainian war taking place around the city of Kupiansk, as well as along the Oskil river between Kupiansk through Dvorichna to the border settlement of Topoli in Kharkiv Oblast, with the goal of capturing Kupiansk and territory along the Oskil river. Offensive operations restarted in the direction after Russian forces attacked Kupiansk in late November 2024, and intensified after Russian forces established several bridgeheads across the western bank of the Oskil river in early 2025.

== Background ==
In September 2022, Ukrainian forces launched a major counteroffensive in Kharkiv Oblast, forcing Russian forces to withdraw from a majority of Kharkiv Oblast and onto the eastern bank of the Oskil river. During the counteroffensive, Kupiansk city was liberated.

In late 2024, amidst Russian offensive efforts in Donetsk Oblast, Russian forces began attacking and advancing in eastern Kharkiv Oblast, particularly in the direction of Kupiansk, the administrative centre of Kupiansk Raion. On 13 November, Russian forces directly attacked Kupiansk city from the north, using two armoured columns. However, by late November, Russian forces had mostly withdrawn from Kupiansk city after successful Ukrainian counterattacks. Russian military bloggers reported in late December that Russian forces had withdrawn from the northeastern outskirts of Kupiansk to fortified positions near Petropavlivka some time ago, as Ukrainian unmanned aerial vehicles disrupted Russian ground supply lines.

At the end of January 2025, the Institute for the Study of War assessed that Russian forces are attempting to use their bridgeheads across the Oskil river to support their advances and encircle Kupiansk from the northwest, as well as set the ground for future advances and offensives into Kharkiv Oblast.

== Offensive ==
=== First bridgeheads established and capture of Dvorichna (November 2024 — January 2025) ===
On 26 November, Russian sources claimed that Russian forces had used boats to cross the Oskil River and had entered the town of Dvorichna. The next day, Russian sources claimed that Russian forces were also attempting to cross the Oskil near the village of Novomlynsk, and that fighting was ongoing on the outskirts of Dvorichna. The following day, Ukrainian officials acknowledged that a small group of Russian forces had crossed to the west bank of the Oskil. According to Ukrainian military observer Kostiantyn Mashovets, Russian forces had crossed the river near a suspension bridge south of Novomlynsk, and the Russian contingent on the west bank of the Oskil was no larger than a company-sized force.

By 1 December, Russian forces had also crossed the Oskil River south of Dvorichna, establishing a second company-sized bridgehead in the area of Masiutivka and Zapadne, according to Mashovets and Russian sources. Russian sources claimed that Russian forces advanced into a forested area west of the village of Masiutivka.

On 3 December, it was reported that the 8th Battalion of Ukraine's 10th Mountain Assault Brigade and the 2nd Battalion of the 3rd Tank Brigade had cleared Russian forces from Novomlynsk and the surrounding area. Geolocated footage indicated that Ukrainian forces were in control of the village. The Ukrainian military claimed that the Russians were forced into a chaotic retreat across the river. Mashovets said the next day that the Russian bridgehead at Novomlynsk had been eliminated and that the bridgehead at Masiutivka-Zapadne had been "significantly reduced" by Ukrainian forces.

However, in mid-December, Mashovets said that the latter Russian bridgehead had "significantly expanded" and that Ukrainian forces had seemingly retreated to the Dvorichna-Kupiansk highway. By late December, Russian sources claimed that Russian forces had advanced to the highway and in early January, Mashovets said that Russian forces were using the highway to advance towards Zapadne. The Russian military claimed to have taken control of Zapadne on 22 January. Footage of Russian forces in the center of the village was published on 4 February. Mashovets acknowledged the next day that Russian forces had seized the village.

Russian forces advanced in the southern and southeastern parts of the town of Dvorichna in mid-December. By mid-January, Mashovets claimed that half of the town was held by Russia's 69th Motor Rifle Division. The Russian military claimed to have taken control of Dvorichna on 28 January, crediting the 25th Motor Rifle Brigade with its capture, but a local Ukrainian official disputed the claim.

In early January, Russian sources claimed that Russian forces had reached the village of Kalynove from the northeast, and the Russian military claimed to have seized Kalynove on 12 January.

=== Continued Russian advances (January–November 2025) ===
Russian (red) and Ukrainian (yellow) positions in the area of Kupiansk as of April 2025

==== North of Dvorichna ====
In mid-January, Russian forces crossed the Russia-Ukraine border and advanced near the border village of Topoli. In early February, Ukrainian and Russian sources reported that Russian forces had established a bridgehead over the Oskil near Topoli, taking up positions on Mount Milova, south of the village. In mid-February, Russian forces advanced near the village, entering its center. On 24 February, the Russian military claimed to have taken Topoli.

Russian forces retook Novomlynsk by 31 January and took Fyholivka by 6 February. In early March, the Ukrainian military claimed that Russian forces were attempting to create a new bridgehead over the Oskil River near Krasne Pershe. Russian forces were also reported to have been advancing toward Krasne Pershe from their bridgehead at Novomlynsk and Fyholivka; Mashovets reported that elements of the 69th Motor Rifle Division had advanced in an area between Fyholivka and the Oskil River. On 20 March, Mashovets claimed that Russian forces had established another bridgehead along the Kamianka-Kolodiazne road. On 28 March, the Russian military claimed to have taken Krasne Pershe.

By early April, Russian forces had advanced across the Oskil River into the southeastern part of the village of Kamianka, and continued to advance in and around the village throughout the month. On 28 April, the Russian military claimed that the 69th Motor Rifle Division's 344th Motor Rifle Regiment had taken full control of Kamianka, although a Ukrainian military spokesman claimed that there were still Ukrainian positions in the village.

==== South of Dvorichna ====
In February, a Russian source said that Russian forces were planning to conduct an offensive south of Zapadne. Mashovets claimed that elements of the 69th Motor Rifle Division were advancing southwards towards Kindrashivka along the Oskil River. By early March, Russian sources claimed that Russian forces had advanced and reached Kindrashivka, reportedly as part of an effort to interdict the Velykyi Burluk-Kupiansk road and enable future attacks on Kupiansk from the northwest. In early April, Russian sources claimed that Russian forces had entered Kindrashivka and established positions in the northern part of the village. In late May, Russian sources claimed that Russian forces had advanced into the eastern part of the village. On 30 May, the Russian military claimed that Kindrashivka had been captured by the 121st Motor Rifle Regiment of the 68th Motor Rifle Division, though in early June, Russian sources claimed that the 27th Motor Rifle Brigade was responsible for the capture.

In late March, Russian sources claimed that Russian forces reached and entered Mala Shapkivka. By mid-April, geolocated footage indicated that Russian forces had reached the eastern outskirts of the village.

In mid-April, Russian forces, reportedly of the 27th Motor Rifle Brigade, advanced in the vicinity of the Dvorichna-Kupiansk highway near Zapadne. By late April, Russian sources claimed that Russian forces had reached the village of Doroshivka. On 29 April, the Russian military claimed that its forces had taken control over Doroshivka.

==== Continued advances west of the Oskil river (May — August) ====
On 23 May, the Russian military claimed that its forces had taken the village of Radkivka, However, in June and July, Russian sources described the village as contested. By 23 July, the Institute for the Study of War assessed that Radkivka was under Russian control.

By 27 May, Russian forces crossed the international border, entering the village of Stroiivka. Two days later, Russian forces took control over Stroiivka.

The Russian military claimed on 18 June that its forces took control of Dovhenke.

On 20 June, the Russian military claimed that its 27th Motor Rifle Brigade had seized Myrove, though this would be disputed by Russian sources throughout July. On 6 July, the Russian military claimed that its forces had taken control over Sobolivka, west of Kupiansk, though this was also disputed by other Russian sources. The Institute for the Study of War assessed that both villages had come under Russian control by 6 August.

By 8 August, Ukrainian forces had retaken Kindrashivka, but on 14 August, Russian sources claimed that the elements of the 25th and 27th Motor Rifle Brigades recaptured Kindrashivka.

==== Russian forces enter Kupiansk (July – November) ====
In late July, a Ukrainian military commander warned that Russian forces were attempting to infiltrate into Kupiansk via Holubivka and Kindrashivka. Russian forces, reportedly of the 121st Motor Rifle Regiment, took control over Holubivka by 24 July, and Russian forces advanced into northern Kupiansk the same day. Later in July, a Ukrainian officer claimed that Russian forces were attempting to flank Kupiansk from the west. By early August, Russian forces had advanced northwest and north of Kupiansk as part of an effort to envelop and seize the city, and had secured positions in the western outskirts of the city.

Throughout August, Russian sources claimed that small groups of Russian forces were infiltrating Kupiansk and were holding positions in buildings on the city's outskirts. By 24 August, Russian forces had advanced within the northern part of Kupiansk.

On 30 August, the Institute for the Study of War assessed that Ukrainian forces had retaken Myrove and Sobolivka. Russian forces retook Myrove by 2 September, though Ukrainian forces recaptured Myrove again by 24 October.

In late August, a Ukrainian military commander claimed that Russian forces were attempting to infiltrate into Kupiansk through sewer lines. In early-mid September, Russian forces attempted to infiltrate northern Kupiansk through an underground gas pipeline between the villages of Lyman Pershyi and Radkivka, according to statements by Ukrainian military officials. Ukrainian forces reportedly later damaged the pipeline to prevent further infiltration attempts.

By 6 September, Russian forces had advanced into the northwestern part of Kupiansk and established forward positions. By 14 September, Russian forces had advanced in central Kupiansk, reaching Sadova Street two days later. Mashovets said that Russian infiltration and assault groups had been detected near the Spartak Stadium and Dovhalivska Street. On 20 September, Russian sources claimed that Russian forces had seized the Kupiansk-Pivdennyi railway station and advanced into the Yuvileinyi district in southwestern Kupiansk, interdicting the Kupiansk-Kharkiv highway. According to Ukrainian military journalist Yurii Butusov, in mid-September, Russian forces captured an important height north of Kupiansk, which placed the Ukrainians in a "critical" situation.

In the beginning of October, Russian sources claimed that about one-third of the city was under Russian control, while a Ukrainian military commander said that Russian forces only held positions in the city's northern outskirts. Russian advances continued in central Kupiansk in early October.

On 18 September, the BBC reported that a new push into Kupiansk is led by former Ukrainian officer Serhii Storozhenko who is currently leading the 6th Combined Arms Army, the next day, Russian forces attempted to infiltrate the city using underground pipes.

On 28 September, the head of the Kupiansk City Military Administration, Andrii Besedin, announced the city's closure to civilians.

By 16 October, according to the British Ministry of Defense, Russian forces had seized most of the high-rise buildings in northern Kupiansk. Russian advances in central Kupiansk continued in late October. By late October and early November, Russian forces had infiltrated southern Kupiansk, occupying buildings and positions in the area. By 9 November, Russian forces had infiltrated southwestern Kupiansk and occupied a building on the H-26 Kupiansk-Kharkiv highway.

=== Ukrainian counteroffensive (late 2025 and 2026) ===
Kupiansk frontline as of 17 December 2025

==== Russian declaration of "full liberation" and Ukrainian counterattack (November–December 2025) ====
On 20 November 2025, Russian general Valery Gerasimov publicly announced that Kupiansk had been fully captured by Russian forces of Army Group Zapad. The Russian ministry of defense credited the 27th Motor Rifle Brigade and 1486th Motor Rifle Regiment with capturing Kupiansk. General Sergey Kuzovlev reiterated the news in the presence of Putin, wearing a quasi-military uniform, who clarified "so that's it, completed it all?" to Kuzovlev's confirmation. The next day, Putin said that Russian forces would "inevitably repeat" what had occurred in Kupiansk on other areas of the front.

The supposed capture of Kupiansk was disputed both by Russian sources and the Ukrainian military, which claimed that the groups of Russian soldiers in Kupiansk numbered about 40 total personnel.

On 27 November while speaking to journalists, Putin once again referred to Kupiansk, saying that "as we know the enemy formations are fully liquidated there", and also said on 2 December that all of Kupiansk had been under complete Russian control for several weeks.

However, during the following weeks Ukrainian forces conducted a series of counterattacks, which resulted in the elimination of the Russian assault forces from the town centre. The operation culminated with President Zelenskyy visiting the entrance to the city in person on 12 December and recording a video at the distinctive monument with the town's name.

The 2nd Corps of the National Guard of Ukraine reported on 12 December that as a result of a Ukrainian counterattack, the villages of Kindrashivka and Radkivka had returned to Ukrainian control, as well as areas in northern Kupiansk. The 2nd Corps claimed that Ukrainian forces broke through to the Oskil River as part of the counterattack, cutting off Russian lines of communication to Kupiansk and surrounding 200 Russian personnel in the city. According to a Ukrainian military report, these advances were the result of a multi-week effort beginning on 16 November. However, Butusov claimed that Ukrainian forces had recaptured Kindrashivka by 9 October, Radkivka by 11 October, and reached the Oskil River, cutting off Russian lines to Kupiansk, by 21 October.

On 13 December, Butusov said that Ukrainian forces had retaken full control over Kupiansk's Yuvileinyi District.

A Ukrainian serviceman posing with weapons and personal documents captured from Russian soldiers during the fighting around Kupiansk

==== Continuing Ukrainian counteroffensive (2026) ====
In October 2026, 2nd Corps of the National Guard's Khartia Brigade issued a report on the successful conclusion of a counteroffensive codenamed Operation Veles in the area of Kupiansk. According to the brigade's commander Ihor Obolienskyi, troops of Khartia, 23rd Assault Regiment "R.U.G.", 21st Unmanned Systems Regiment "Lava", Freedom of Russia Legion, 429th Unmanned Systems Brigade "Achilles" and other units performed a combined offensive. Using underground pipelines, Ukrainian troops advanced on a distance of 15 km and managed to reach rear positions of the enemy, resulting in the loss of more than 100 soldiers by the Russian army, including over 30 prisoners of war. As a result, Ukrainian troops prevented a new infiltration of Russian units into Kupiansk.

== Analysis ==
The Kupiansk offensive is part of a renewed effort to advance into eastern Kharkiv Oblast and retake positions up to, and across, the Oskil river in order to cut off Ukrainian logistics on the eastern bank. The Institute for the Study of War has assessed that recapturing territory up to the Oskil river would allow Russian forces to encircle northern Donetsk Oblast and directly attack Ukrainian logistics centres there, such as Lyman, as part of Russia's broader main effort in eastern Ukraine.

== See also ==
- Russian occupation of Kharkiv Oblast
- Northern Kharkiv front of the Russo-Ukrainian War
- Kharkiv Oblast campaign (2024–present)
- Timeline of the Russian invasion of Ukraine (1 January 2025 – 31 May 2025)
