= Dvorichne =

Village in Kharkiv Oblast, Ukraine

Dvorichne Дворічне
- Village
- Interactive map of Dvorichne
- Location within Kharkiv Oblast Location within Ukraine
- Coordinates: 49°51′11″N 37°43′55″E
- Country: Ukraine
- Oblast: Kharkiv Oblast
- Raion: Kupiansk Raion
- Hromada: Dvorichna settlement hromada
- Founded: 1825

Government
  - Type: Dvorichna Settlement Council

Area
  - Total: 3.4 km^{2} (1.3 sq mi)
- Elevation: 85 m (279 ft)

Population
  - Total: 326
  - Density: 96/km^{2} (250/sq mi)
- Time zone: UTC+2 (EET)
  - Summer (DST): UTC+3 (EEST)
- Postal code: 62731
- Area code: 5750
- KOATUU code: 6321885504
- KATOTTH code: UA63080050540076635

Dvorichne (Ukrainian: Дворічне, Russian: Двуречное, romanized: Dvurechnoe) is a village in Kupiansk Raion, Kharkiv Oblast, Ukraine. It belongs to Dvorichna settlement hromada, one of the hromadas of Ukraine. The village has a pre-war population of 326 people, and is most notable for Dvorichna station which resides in the middle of the village. During the Russian invasion of Ukraine, the village would become a frontline settlement after the 2022 Ukrainian eastern counteroffensive in September 2022, and would remain largely contested until Russian forces pushed the last Ukrainian forces from the settlement on 10 February 2023. The village remains under Russian control as of May 2023.

== Geography ==
Dvorichne is located on the left bank of the Oskil river, where it is situated next to the Tavilzhanka tributary and about 2 km (1.2 mi) upstream from the Verkhnya Dvorichna and Nizhnya Dvorichna tributaries. The village is adjacent to the downstream villages of Hrianykivka and Horobivka, and is surrounded by forest. Most notably, the village is home to Dvorichna station, which is the only railway station in the area.

== History ==
Between 1932 and 1933, the village suffered a large reduction in population during the Holodomor famine, which in a combined casualty count killed 113 in Dvorichne and ten other small settlements nearby.

On 12 June 2020; Decree No. 725-r of the Cabinet of Ministers of Ukraine placed the village in the administration of the Dvorichan settlement hromada, and on 17 July became part of the Kupiansk Raion as a result of administrative-territorial reform which abolished the Dvorichna Raion.

=== Russian invasion of Ukraine ===
In the Russian invasion of Ukraine, the village was occupied by Russian troops during their initial advance into the nation. It became a frontline village after the settlement was successfully recaptured sometime in September by Ukrainian forces during the 2022 Ukrainian eastern counteroffensive. The village would change hands multiple times from then, largely remaining contested until it definitively came under partial Russian control on 4 February 2023, when Ukrainian forces were pushed out of the western outskirts of the village. This progress of the Russian forces was continued on 8 February, until the village came under full Russian control on 10 February, where it remains as of May 2023. Despite the Russian capture, the village still comes under artillery fire with the frontline still not far away.

== Notable people ==
- Pysarevsky Petro Stepanovych (1820–1871), Ukrainian poet, author of burlesque poems and fables.

== See also ==
List of nearby settlements

- Hrianykivka
- Horobivka
- Tavilzhanka
- Dvorichna
