= Topoli (village), Kharkiv Oblast =

Village in Kharkiv Oblast, Ukraine

Topoli Тополі
- Village
- Interactive map of Topoli
- Location within Kharkiv Oblast Location within Ukraine
- Coordinates: 49°57′52″N 37°54′31″E
- Country: Ukraine
- Oblast: Kharkiv Oblast
- Raion: Kupiansk Raion
- Hromada: Dvorichna settlement hromada
- Founded: 1920

Area
  - Total: 0.737 km^{2} (0.285 sq mi)

Population
  - Total: 0
  - Density: 0.0/km^{2} (0.0/sq mi)
- Time zone: UTC+2 (EET)
  - Summer (DST): UTC+3 (EEST)
- Postal code: 62722
- Area code: +380 5750
- KOATUU code: 6321884503
- KATOTTH code: UA63080050550097728

Topoli (Ukrainian: Тополі; Russian: Тополи, lit. 'Poplars') is a village in Kupiansk Raion, Kharkiv Oblast, Ukraine, near the border with Russia.

It was captured early in the 2022 Russian invasion of Ukraine by Russian forces.

== Geography ==
Topoli is south-east of the river Oskil. It is 17 kilometers from Tavilzhanka, 21 kilometers from Dvorichna, 40 kilometers from Kivsharivka and 35 kilometers from Kupiansk. It was part of Dvorichna Raion until that was merged with Kupiansk Raion in 2020.

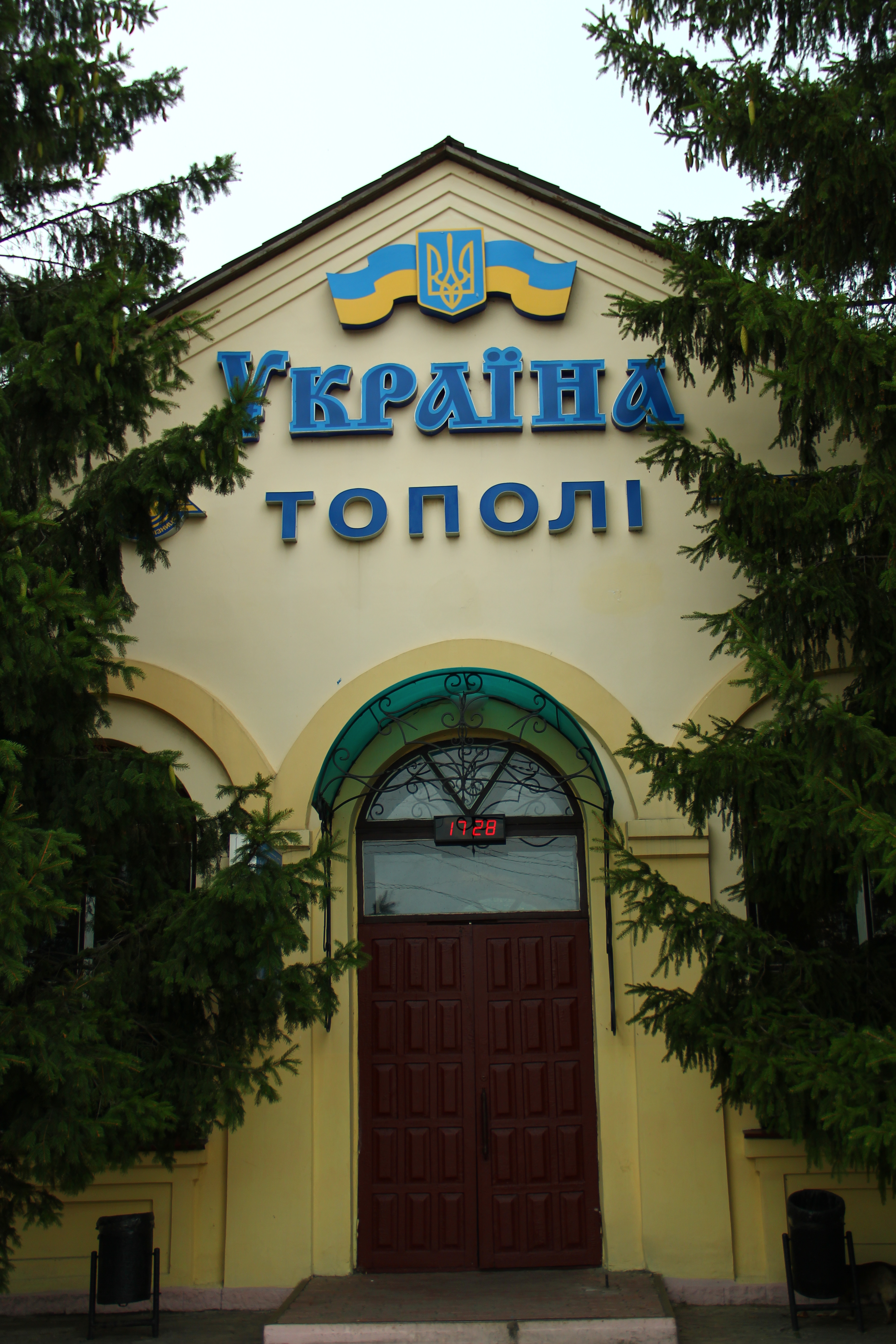
Topoli railway station

A railway line runs north through the village and across the border to Urazovo in Russia. Since June 24, 2017, there has been a border service point named after the town Topoli (border checkpoint), which was opened by Interior Minister Arsen Avakov and NSDC Secretary Oleksandr Turchynov.

== History ==
The village was founded in 1725.

On June 12, 2020, it became part of Dvorichna settlement hromada. On July 17, 2020, after the abolition of Dvorichna Raion, it became part of Kupiansk Raion.

The village was occupied by Russian troops on February 25, 2022.

== Social facilities ==
There is a cultural center with a hall that seats 120, and a library. Children are educated at Topoli High School. There is a medical center, paramedic stations, and a network of retail outlets.
