= Dvorichna settlement hromada =

Administrative unit in Kharkiv Oblast, Ukraine

Dvorichna settlement hromada Дворічанська селищна громада
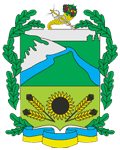
- Coat of arms

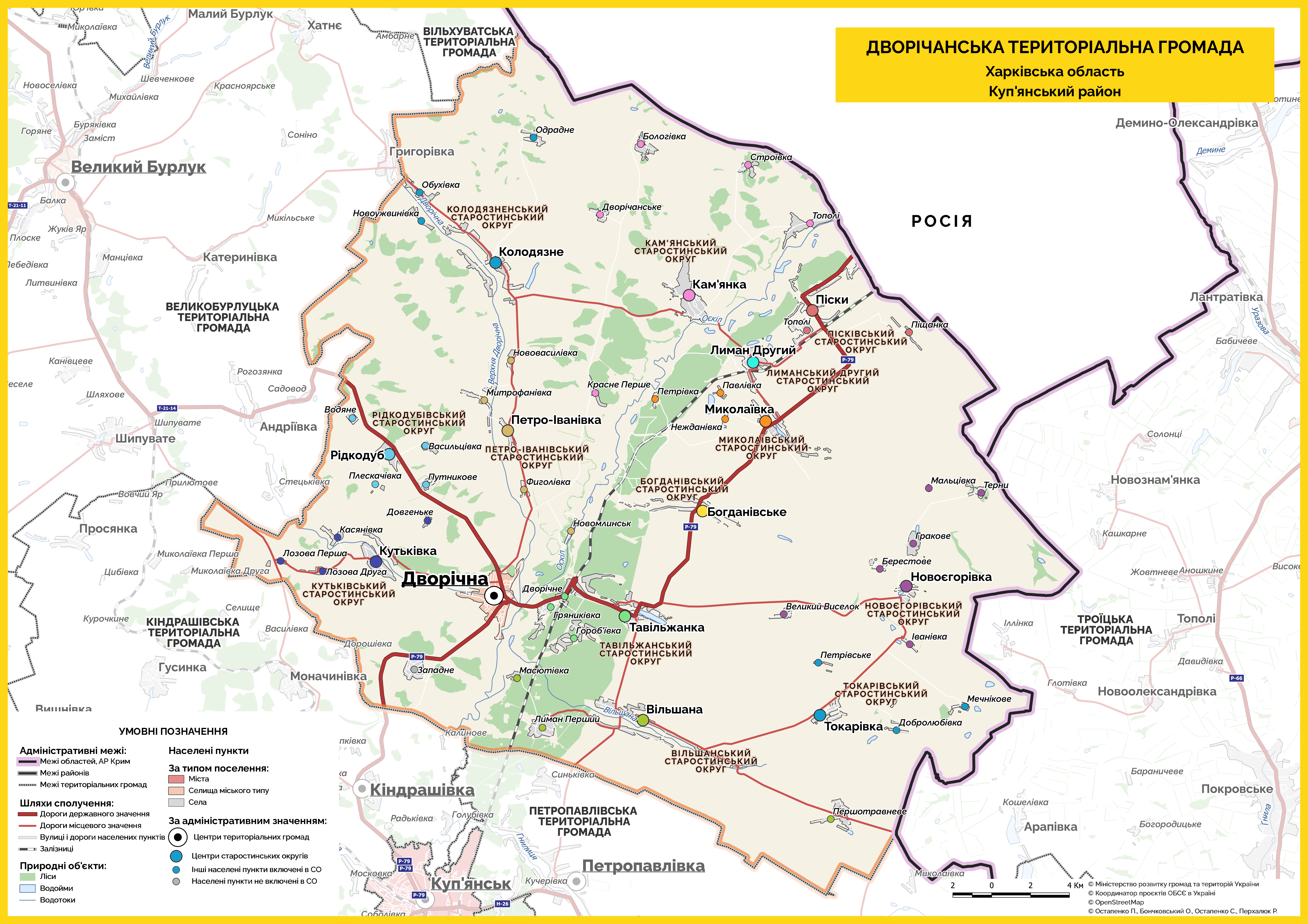
- Ukrainian-language map of the settlement hromada
- Coordinates: 49°51′N 37°41′E
- Country: Ukraine
- Oblast: Kharkiv Oblast
- Raion: Kupiansk Raion
- Founded: June 12, 2020; 6 years ago
- Administrative center: Dvorichna

Government
  - Head of the Hromada: Turbaba Halyna Hryhorivna ("Halyna Turbaba") (non-partisan)

Area
  - Total: 1,109.1 km^{2} (428.2 sq mi)

Population (April 2023) (Note: The population given only accounts for those in recaptured areas by Ukrainian forces, and is an estimate.)
  - Total: 1,100
  - Density: 0.99/km^{2} (2.6/sq mi)
- Time zone: UTC+2 (EET)
  - Summer (DST): UTC+3 (EEST)
- Postal code: 62702
- Number of settlements: 55
- KATOTTH code: UA63080050000048455
- EDRPOU code: 04397037
- Website: dvor-selrada.gov.ua

The Dvorichna settlement hromada (Ukrainian: Дворічанська селищна громада, romanized: Dvorichanska selyshchna hromada; Russian: Дворичанская поселковая община) is a hromada in the Kupiansk Raion, Kharkiv Oblast, Ukraine. The hromada was created on 12 June 2020, and is centrally administered by the rural settlement of Dvorichna, being the local government for 55 settlements. The pre-war population of the hromada was small, and the economy was largely agriculture-based with little industry. As of 2025, the hromada remains about half occupied by Russian forces as a result of the Russo-Ukrainian war, and has been severely depopulated because of a mandatory evacuation that has been issued for all civilians in recaptured areas.

== Overview ==
The hromada is largely composed of flat, agricultural land, with virtually no industrial areas. In line with this, the hromada is also largely undeveloped, only gaining access to electricity more recently, and remains with little outside communication or internet. Because of this, while the hromada does have an official website, it is sparsely updated with new information.

Before the Russo-Ukrainian war, income in the hromada came entirely from agriculture, animal husbandry, accounting, education, medicine, and administration. The hromada did notably have a successful sports school in the head administrative settlement Dvorichna, along with multiple other schools and a kindergarten.

== History ==
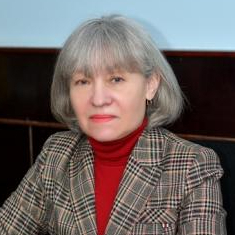
Halyna Turbaba c. 2020, the first and only Head of the Hromada

=== Founding and early years ===
The hromada was created on 12 June 2020 after merging 14 settlement councils within the soon to be abolished Dvorichna Raion. (Note: Those 14 settlement councils being the Bohdanivske, Dvorichna, Kamianka, Kolodiazne, Kutkivka, Lyman Druhyi, Mykolaivka, Novoiehorivka, Petro-Ivanivka, Pisky, Ridkodub, Tavilzhanka, Tokarivka, and Vilshana settlement councils.) Upon establishment, the hromada became the local government for 55 settlements, and had a total population of 16,568 in January 2021.

The hromada held their first elections on 25 October 2020, where Dvorichna native Turbaba Halyna Hryhorivna was elected as Head of the Hromada. Before the war in 2022, the hromada had a total population of approximately 16,500 within a 1,109.1 km^{2} (428.2 sq mi) area.

=== Russo-Ukrainian war (2022–present) ===
The entire hromada was occupied by Russian forces in their initial invasion of Ukraine in February 2022. During full occupation, Halyna Turbaba was imprisoned twice for refusing to cooperate with the Russian military. During Turbaba's first imprisonment lasting one month, and second imprisonment 50 days, some lesser hromada officials agreed to work with the Russians. In this time: better houses, along with useful equipment from farms, were reportedly confiscated by the Russian military. Many residents likewise left for the Russian border or travel across a dam going over the Pecheneg Reservoir to territory controlled by Ukrainian forces.

The territorial situation only changed in the hromada after the successful Kharkiv counteroffensive conducted by Ukrainian forces during September 2022, where control of the hromada was ultimately divided along the Oskil river by 12 September, and remained this way with some exceptions. (Note: After first establishing positions in Hrianykivka on 15 September, Ukraine later regained control of some settlements east of the Oskil: including Dvorichne likely on 19 September, Hrianykivka and Horobivka on 24 September, and Lyman Pershyi and Masiutivka on unknown dates due to the fog of war. Ongoing fighting also disputed control of Tavilzhanka.) After the counteroffensive, those lesser officials who worked with the Russians fled the hromada, and many former-residents who left for Russia returned to live in Kharkiv or moved to other European nations including Czechia, Germany, Norway, Poland, Sweden, and Switzerland, as the now-frontline hromada was placed under mandatory evacuation. This depopulation led to only about 2,000 residents remaining in the recaptured areas of the hromada by December 2022, and only 1,100 residents by April 2023, consisting primarily of the elderly, with only 60 of whom being children.

Also by December 2022, 30% of all residential buildings in the hromada were believed to have been destroyed, alongside much of the hromada's educational, medical, recreational infrastructure, and administrative buildings. Daily shelling of the hromada that had taken place since Ukraine's counteroffensive additionally destroyed much of the head administrative settlement Dvorichna: including all 35 apartment buildings there, and 70% of residential buildings. Neighboring villages similarly suffered, with the north-east village of Kamianka having 100% of buildings damaged or destroyed, and the population drop from around 1,000 to 10 by January 2023. All buildings not bordering neighboring settlement hromadas have also lost access to electricity, gas, and heat, leading to the hromada's post offices, banks, pharmacies, and other reliant establishments being closed indefinitely.

There are people who are planning to return. The fact is that there will probably be nowhere to return to - Dvorichna [hromada] is being demolished from the face of the earth

— Halyna Turbaba, Head of the Hromada, April 2023 interview with Suspilne

Because of these factors, much of the remaining population either lives in their yards or basements because of damages from the war. Humanitarian aid consisting of food, hygiene, firewood, fuel, and other highly needed items are delivered on average twice a month to residents, making still living in the hromada possible. A bakery built by humanitarian workers along with local village vegetable gardens also provide more food than necessary to residents. A local doctor and ambulance also provides medical assistance despite the lack of a functioning pharmacy. Administration is still led by Turbaba, and two other officials, with more opting to work remotely. There is little to no communication with the occupied half of the hromada, with there existing the possibility of a humanitarian disaster.

==== Territorial control after the Kharkiv counteroffensive (2022–2024) ====
After Ukraine's successful counteroffensive, the territorial situation in the hromada did not change again until 18 October, when a localized Russian counteroffensive recaptured Horobivka. Four months later from 4 to 18 February 2023, a larger Russian counteroffensive from Dvorichne pushed Ukrainian forces from the settlement on 10 February, and continued their advance to capture Lyman Pershyi on 16 February, and Hrianykivka on 18 February, being the last significant event from the offensive. According to Turbaba, it was about this time that Hrianykivka's population became zero after every building there had been destroyed during the series of offensives and counteroffensives.

On 15 May 2023, another localized Russia counteroffensive recaptured Masiutivka, the last settlement in the hromada on the east side of the Oskil.

On 17 July 2023, Russian forces attempted to further their advances from Masiutivka and attempt to cross the Oskil. While the Ukrainian General Staff reported that the offensive was unsuccessful, a Russian milblogger claimed that the offensive captured 1–2 km (0.6–1.2 mi) of land in this direction. This claim was later supported by other milbloggers and the Russian Ministry of Defense two days later on 19 July. The Russian advance in this direction continued again on 8 August, with forces of the 6th Combined Arms Army capturing positions south of Vilshana and Lyman Pershyi.

On 11 November 2023, Ukraine reaffirmed their control over Topoli by raising their flag in the settlement. The State Border Guard Service of Ukraine claimed the flag raising showed the recapture of the settlement, however, it is unclear when or if the village was ever captured by Russia.

On 26 September 2024, as part of a wider effort to remove Russian toponymy, the village of Pershotravneve was renamed to Manuilivka, as per a decree voted on by the Verkhovna Rada on 19 September, despite being fully under Russian control.

On 3 December 2024, a localized Ukrainian counterattack recaptured the village of Novomlynsk and the surrounding Russian bridgehead on the west bank of the Oskil, which reportedly had expanded in late November. The clearing operation was conducted by the 8th Mountain Assault Infantry Battalion of the 10th Mountain Assault Brigade using artillery and drones.

==== Territorial control during the Kupiansk offensive (2025– ) ====
In 2025, large scale operations by Russian forces to retake the western half of the hromada began as a supporting axis of the Kupiansk offensive, starting with the creation of a bridgehead across the Oskil river into Dvorichna on 9 January. These Russian operations, often consisting of small infantry units attempting to establish multiple river crossings, continued for months. During this time between January and February 2025, multiple villages were captured: including Zapadne on 22 January, the administrative center settlement of Dvorichna on 28 January, Novomlynsk on 31 January, Fyholivka on 17 February, and Topoli on 24 February. According to deputy commander of the 429th Unmanned Systems Regiment, Russian forces were able to establish makeshift defenses in these bridgeheads territories in the form of houses, basements, and newly dug foxholes, but were incurring "quite serious losses" while doing so.

After the initial territory loss, Ukraine launched a localized counterattack in early March, recapturing Fyholivka on 14 March, and the north of Zapadne. The counterattack was short-lived, however, and by 24 March, Russia expanded their control around the village of Topoli.

On 28 April, Russian media claimed to have captured Kamianka, a claim quickly denied by Khortytsia operational-strategic group, who confirmed Ukraine still controlled most of the village, with only a small portion controlled by Russian forces and in the gray zone. Around 27 May, Russian forces expanded their bridgehead around Kamianka, and using small sabotage and reconnaissance groups, unsuccessfully attempted to cross the Russian border and capture the village of Stroivka. Two days later on 29 May, Russian forces tried again and captured likely much of Stroivka after releasing a video showing their flag in the southern part of it. On 18 June, the Russian Ministry of Defense claimed to have captured Dovhenke. On the night of 3–4 July, Russian forces captured the remainder of Stroivka, and further expanded their control around Topoli. Around 5 September, Russian forces advanced around Krasne Pershe. In October, Russian forces advanced from the Russian border towards Odradne, which by 24 November, they successfully captured after also advancing from a recently captured Bolohivka.

== Demographics ==
As of the 2001 Ukrainian census, the hromada counted a population of 22,062 registered inhabitants. The linguistic composition of the population was as follows:

Native languages (2001)
| | percent |
| Ukrainian | 84.8% |
| Russian | 14.4% |
| Belarusian | 0.2% |
| Romanian | 0.2% |
| Armenian | 0.1% |
| Romani | 0.1% |
| others | 0.2% |

=== List of settlements ===
The hromada contains the rural settlement Dvorichna, which serves as the administrative center, as well as an additional 54 populated places:

- Berestove
- Bohdanivske
- Bolohivka
- Dobroliubika
- Dovhenke
- Dvorichanske
- Dvorichne
- Fyholivka
- Horobivka
- Hrakove
- Hrianykivka
- Ivanivka
- Lozova Druha
- Lozova Persha
- Lyman Druhyi
- Lyman Pershyi
- Kamianka
- Kasianivka
- Kolodiazne
- Krasne Pershe
- Kutkivka
- Maltsivka
- Manuilivka
- Masiutivka
- Mechnykove
- Mykolaivka
- Mytrofanivka
- Nezhdanivka
- Novoiehorivka
- Novomlynsk
- Novouzhvynivka
- Novovasylivka
- Obukhivka
- Odradne
- Pavlivka
- Petrivka
- Petrivske
- Petro-Ivanivka
- Pishchanka
- Pisky
- Pleskachivka
- Putnykove
- Ridkodub
- Tavilzhanka
- Stroivka
- Terny
- Tokarivka
- Topoli (rural settlement)
- Topoli (village)
- Vasyltsivka
- Velykyi Vyselok
- Vilshana
- Vodiane
- Zapadne
