= Masiutivka =

Village in Kharkiv Oblast, Ukraine

Masiutivka Масютівка
- Village
- Interactive map of Masiutivka
- Location within Kharkiv Oblast Location within Ukraine
- Coordinates: 49°48′49″N 37°41′08″E
- Country: Ukraine
- Oblast: Kharkiv Oblast
- Raion: Kupiansk Raion
- Founded: 1780

Government
  - Type: Dvorichna settlement hromada

Area
  - Total: 0.248 km^{2} (0.096 sq mi)
- Elevation: 80 m (260 ft)

Population (2001 census)
  - Total: 22
  - Density: 89/km^{2} (230/sq mi)
- Time zone: UTC+2 (EET)
  - Summer (DST): UTC+3 (EEST)
- Postal code: 62733
- Area code: +380 5750
- KOATUU code: 6321883503
- KATOTTH code: UA63080050260095484

Masiutivka (Ukrainian: Масютівка, Russian: Масютовка, romanized: Masyutovka) is a village in Kupiansk Raion, Kharkiv Oblast, Ukraine. During the Russian invasion in 2022, the village was captured early in the war by Russian forces, but was regained by Ukrainian forces likely sometime in early November. On 15 May 2023, a renewed local Russian offensive recaptured the village. Russian forces have maintained control of the village since then, and as of mid-July, have used area surrounding the village as a grouping point to stage attacks with the intent to cross the Oskil.

== Geography ==
The village is located on the left bank of the Oskil river, below the smaller Vilshana river.

The village consists of scattered houses located in a large pine forest. The closest railway station is located at Movchanov at a distance of 2 km (1.2 mi) away.

== History ==
According to the 2001 census, the village had a population of 22 people, who lived in two of the three estates located in the village.

On 12 June 2020; Decree No. 725-r of the Cabinet of Ministers of Ukraine placed the village in the administration of the Dvorichna settlement hromada, and on 17 July became part of the Kupiansk Raion as a result of administrative-territorial reform which abolished the Dvorichna Raion.

=== Russian invasion of Ukraine ===
At the beginning of the Russian invasion of Ukraine, Masiutivka was occupied by Russian troops in their initial advance into Ukraine. The outskirts of the village were likely retaken after the successful 2022 Kharkiv counteroffensive by Ukraine, which pushed Russian forces to the Oskil river bordering the village. On 12 November 2022, the village was referred to as being defended by Ukrainian forces, meaning it was recaptured on a prior unspecified date, which was further supported by an update to DeepStateMap.Live on 20 November claiming the same thing.

On 13 and 25 April 2023, attacks against the village increased from Russian forces, which would become an offensive on 10 May, but would turn out to be unsuccessful. Undeterred, Russian forces carried out airstrikes on the village the following day, and would attempt to take the village again on 14 and 15 May, which would ultimately be successful.

On 17 July 2023, Russian forces would attempt to further their advances from the village and attempt to cross the Oskil. While the Ukrainian General Staff reported that the offensive was unsuccessful, a Russian milblogger claimed that the offensive captured 1–2 km (1.2 mi) of land in this direction. This claim would be supported by other milbloggers and the Russian Ministry of Defense two days later on 19 July.

== Demographics ==
As of the 2001 Ukrainian census, Masiutivka had a population of 22 inhabitants. 13 inhabitants spoke Ukrainian as their primary language, while 9 spoke Russian.

Native languages in Masiutivka
	percent
Ukrainian	59.1%
Russian	40.9%
others	0.0%

== See also ==
Nearby settlements

- Dvorichna
- Horobivka
- Hrianykivka
- Lyman Pershyi
