= Topoli (rural settlement) =

Rural-type settlement in Kharkiv Oblast, Ukraine

Topoli Тополі
- Rural settlement
- Interactive map of Topoli
- Location within Kharkiv Oblast Location within Ukraine
- Coordinates: 50°00′55″N 37°55′00″E
- Country: Ukraine
- Oblast: Kharkiv Oblast
- Raion: Kupiansk Raion
- Hromada: Dvorichna settlement hromada
- Founded: 1725

Government
  - Type: Dvorichna Settlement Council

Area
  - Total: 1,273 km^{2} (492 sq mi)

Population (2001 census)
  - Total: 261
  - Density: 0.205/km^{2} (0.531/sq mi)
- Time zone: UTC+2 (EET)
  - Summer (DST): UTC+3 (EEST)
- Postal code: 62712
- Area code: +380 5750
- KOATUU code: 6321881509
- KATOTTH code: UA63080050550097728

Topoli (Ukrainian: Тополі; Russian: Тополи, lit. 'Poplars') is a rural settlement in Kupiansk Raion, Kharkiv Oblast, Ukraine.

== Geography ==
Topoli is on the western, right bank of the Oskil River, adjacent to the border with Russia and at the northern end of Dvorichna National Nature Park. On the other side of the Oskil, to the south, there is a much larger village that is also called Topoli.

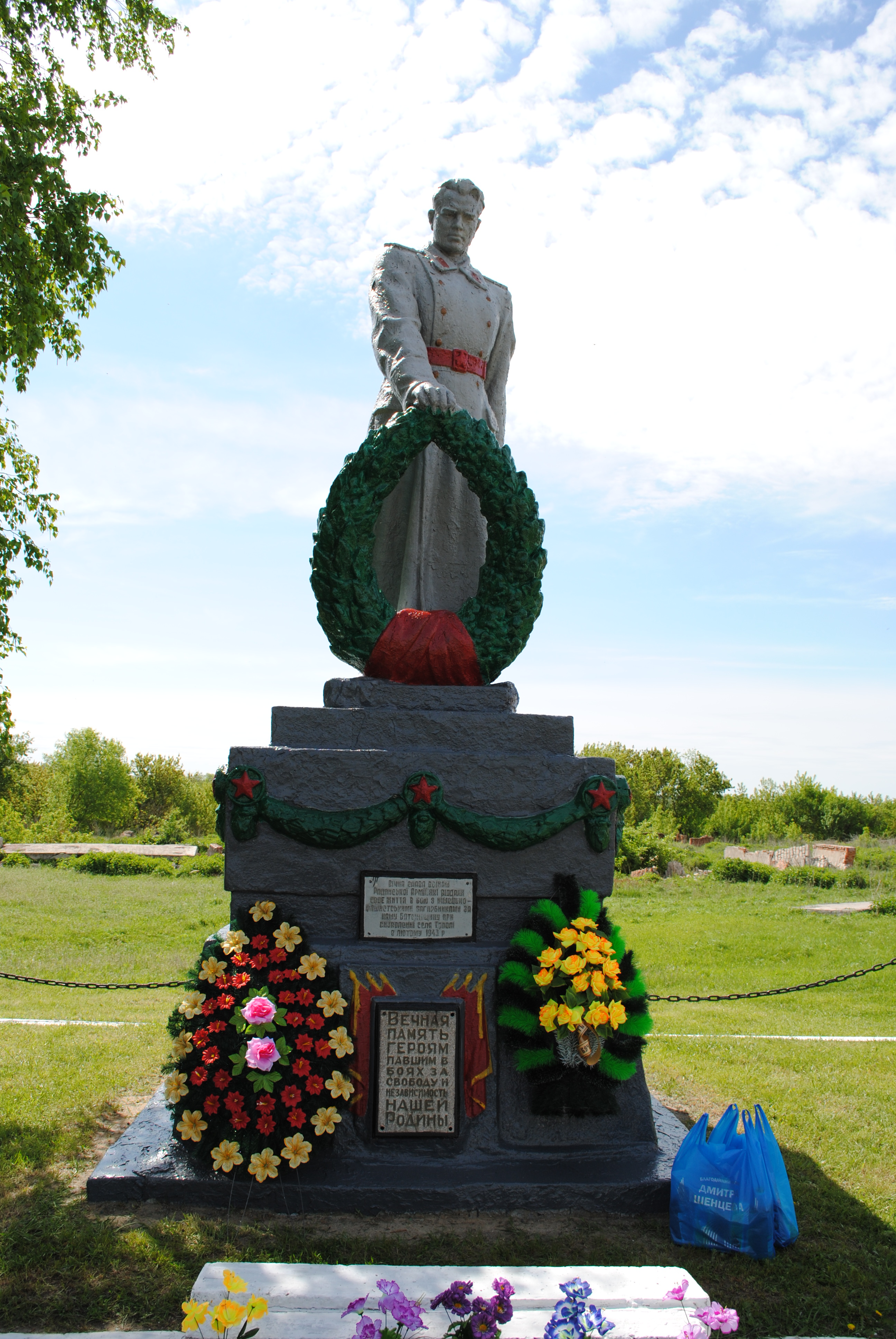
Grave of six Soviet soldiers in the centre of the village

== History ==
On June 12, 2020, in accordance with the Order of the Cabinet of Ministers of Ukraine No. 725-p "On the definition of administrative centers and approval of territories of territorial hromadas of Kharkiv oblast", it became part of Dvorichna settlement hromada. On July 19, 2020, as a result of further administrative-territorial reforms that abolished Dvorichna Raion, the village became part of Kupiansk Raion of Kharkiv Oblast.

=== Russo-Ukrainian War ===
The village was occupied by Russian troops on February 24, 2022, during the Russian invasion of Ukraine. They withdrew from the village and the rest of the western side of the Oskil River on about 11 September 2022 during Ukraine's Kharkiv counteroffensive. Due to heavy mining, Topoli and the neighbouring village of Stroivka remained empty until September 2023, when Ukrainian forces cleared a path through the mines and re-entered the villages.

On 24 February 2025, Russia claimed that its forces recaptured the village. Deep State UA, a Ukrainian open-source intelligence organisation, claimed that Russian forces advanced near the village. Deep State UA claimed Russia recaptured the rural settlement on March 23, 2025.
