= Hrianykivka =

Village in Kharkiv Oblast, Ukraine

Hrianykivka Гряниківка
- Village
- Interactive map of Hrianykivka
- Location within Kharkiv Oblast Location within Ukraine
- Coordinates: 49°50′44″N 37°42′50″E
- Country: Ukraine
- Oblast: Kharkiv Oblast
- Raion: Kupiansk Raion
- Founded: 1825

Government
  - Type: Dvorichna settlement hromada

Area
  - Total: 0.737 km^{2} (0.285 sq mi)
- Elevation: 82 m (269 ft)

Population (2001 census)
  - Total: 607
  - Density: 824/km^{2} (2,130/sq mi)
- Time zone: UTC+2 (EET)
  - Summer (DST): UTC+3 (EEST)
- Postal code: 62731
- Area code: +380 5750
- KOATUU code: 6321885503
- KATOTTH code: UA63080050110044547

Hrianykivka (Ukrainian: Гряниківка; Russian: Гряниковка, romanized: Gryanikovka) is a village in Kupiansk Raion, Kharkiv Oblast, Ukraine. It is 105 km (65 mi) east of the centre of Kharkiv city.

The village came under attack by Russian forces in 2022, during the Russian invasion of Ukraine; Ukrainian forces recaptured it in September 2022, before it was again captured by Russian forces in February 2023.

== Demographics ==
As of the 2001 Ukrainian census, the village had a population of 607 inhabitants. The linguistic composition was as follows:

Native languages in Hrianykivka
	percent
Ukrainian	92.4%
Russian	7.4%
Hungarian	0.2%
others	0.0%

== See also ==
List of nearby settlements

- Horobivka
- Dvorichna
- Dvorichne
- Tavilzhanka
- Masiutivka
