= Vilshana, Kharkiv Oblast =

Vilshana Вільшана
- Village
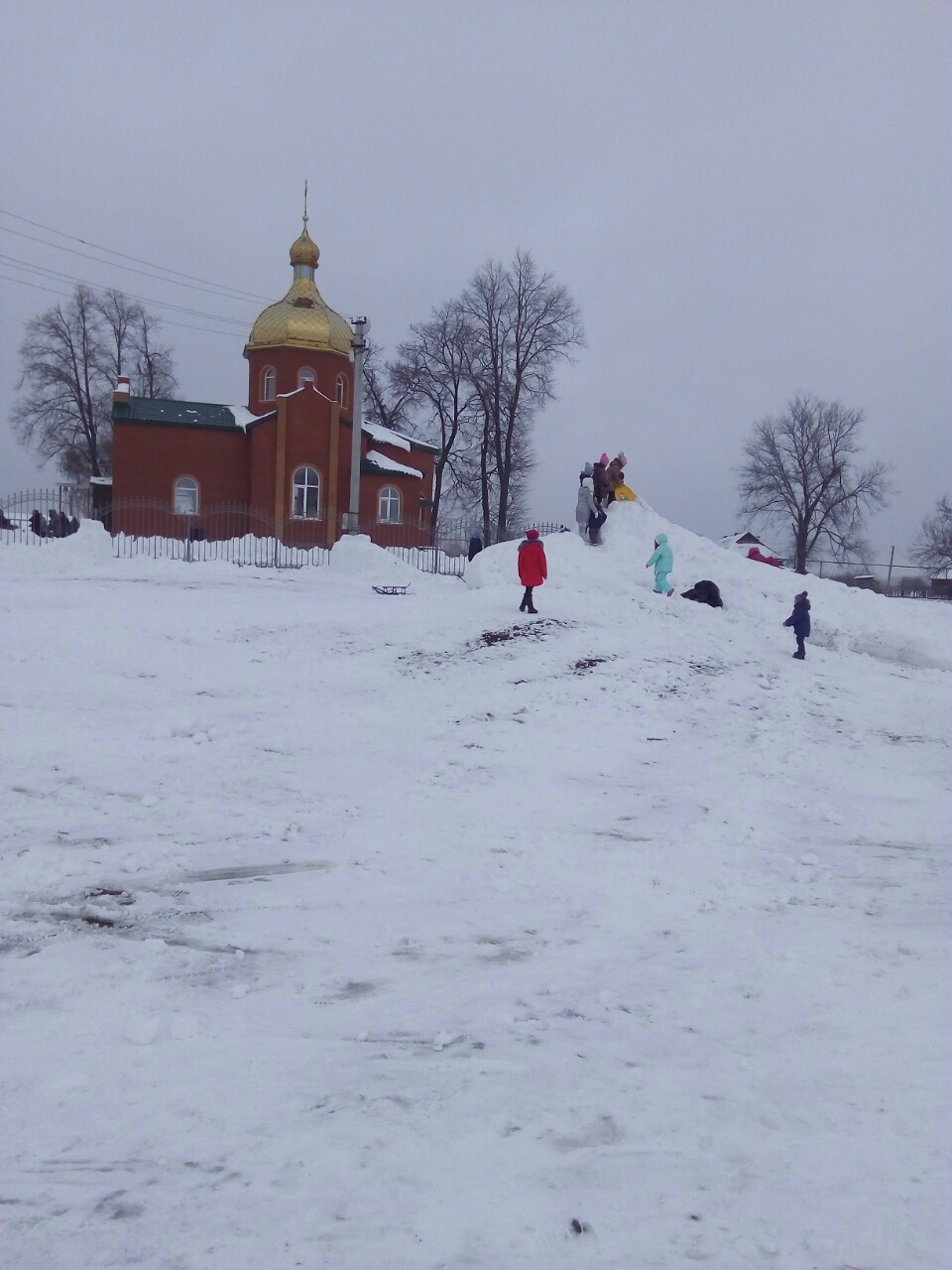

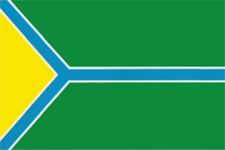
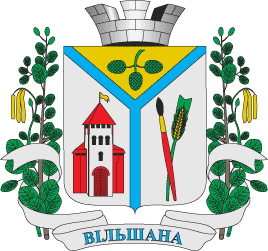
- Flag Seal

- Location of Vilshana within Ukraine Vilshana (Ukraine)
- Coordinates: 49°47′29″N 37°45′45″E
- Country: Ukraine
- Oblast: Kharkiv Oblast
- Raion: Kupiansk Raion
- Founded: 1699

Area
  - Total: 5,766 km^{2} (2,226 sq mi)
- Elevation: 108 m (354 ft)

Population
  - Total: 1,500
  - Density: 260.15/km^{2} (673.8/sq mi)

Vilshana (Ukrainian: Вільшана) is a village in Kupiansk Raion, Kharkiv Oblast, Ukraine. It has a population of 1,500 people.

The village has been occupied by Russian troops since February 24, 2022.

== Geography ==
The Vilshana River flows into the Oskil River, which is west of the locality. Tavilzhanka is north of the settlement. The elevation is 108 meters.

== History ==
The village was founded in 1699. In the 1820s, in official documents, the settlement was called Novovilshana, and later Vilshana.

The village suffered as a result of the Holodomor famine of the Ukrainian people carried out by the government of the USSR in 1932–1933, which some have described as a genocide, the number of identified victims in the surrounding area was 113 people.

On June 12, 2020, in accordance with the Order of the Cabinet of Ministers of Ukraine No. 725-p "On the definition of administrative centers and approval of territories of territorial communities of Kharkiv Oblast", it became part of the Dvorichanska settlement community.

On July 17, 2020, as a result of the administrative-territorial reform and dissolution of Dvorichina raion, the village became part of the Kupiansk Raion of Kharkiv oblast.

The village is under Russian occupation and is one of the few settlements in Kharkiv Oblast still occupied after the counteroffensive conducted by Ukraine in late 2022.

== Demographics ==
In 2001, Vilshana had a population of 1,500 people, out of whom 1,395 spoke Ukrainian, 98 Russian, 3 Belarusian, 3 Armenian, and 1 spoke Romanian as their native languages.

Native languages in Vilshana
	percent
Ukrainian	93.0%
Russian	6.5%
Armenian	0.2%
Belarusian	0.2%
Romanian	0.1%
others	0.0%

== Social buildings ==
Amenities include a school, kindergarten, hospital, library and a club.

== Places of interest ==
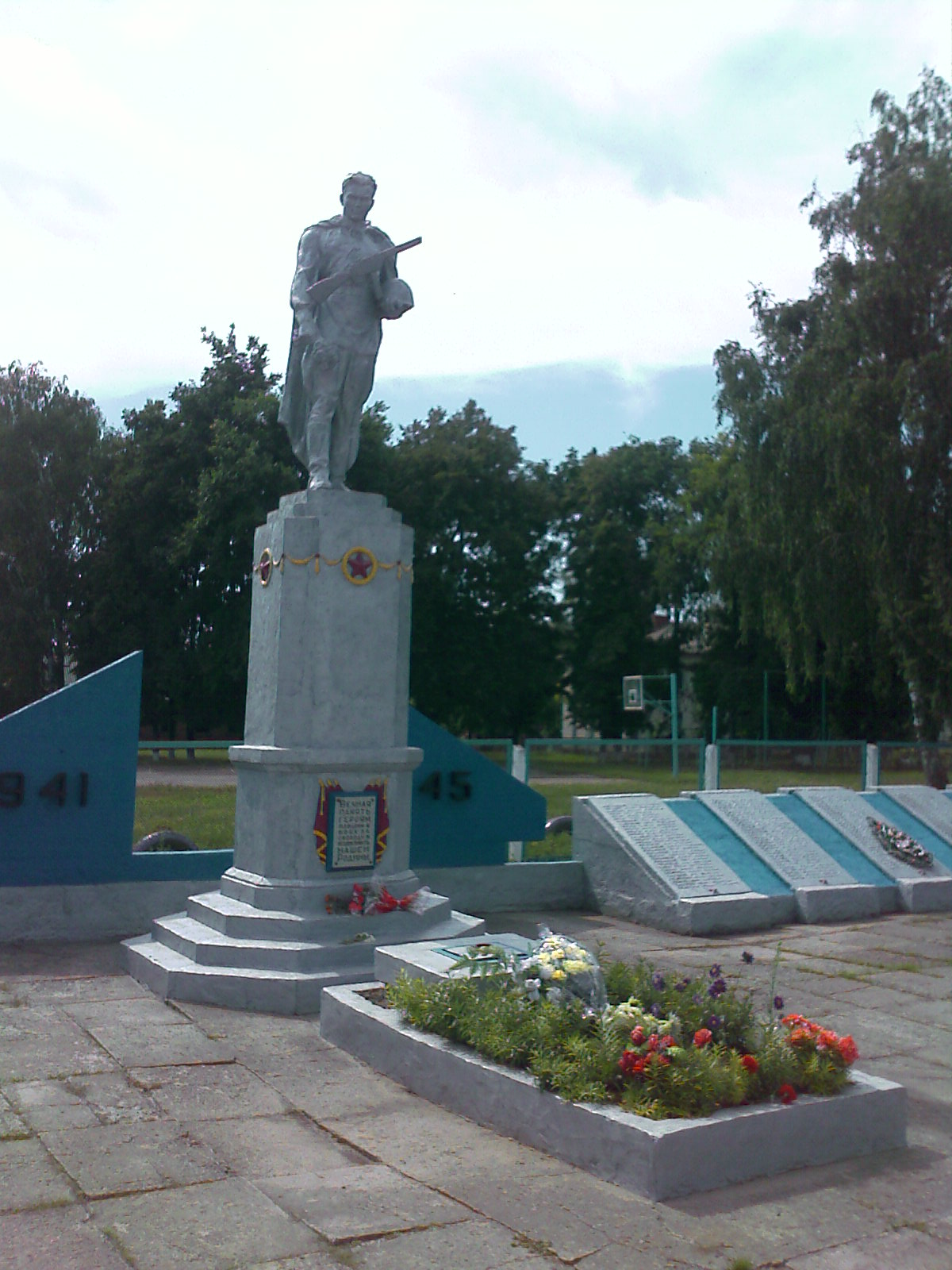
Monument to Red Army Soldiers

- Vilshana Branch of the Orthodox Church of the Ascension of the Lord.
- Mass grave of Red Army soldiers. 24 soldiers were buried.
