= Horobivka =

Village in Kharkiv Oblast, Ukraine

Horobivka Гороб'ївка
- Village
- Interactive map of Horobivka
- Location within Kharkiv Oblast Location within Ukraine
- Coordinates: 49°49′54″N 37°43′44″E
- Country: Ukraine
- Oblast: Kharkiv Oblast
- Raion: Kupiansk Raion
- Founded: 1799

Government
  - Type: Dvorichna settlement hromada

Area
  - Total: 1,088 km^{2} (420 sq mi)
- Elevation: 90 m (300 ft)

Population (2001)
  - Total: 263
  - Density: 0.242/km^{2} (0.626/sq mi)
- Time zone: UTC+2 (EET)
  - Summer (DST): UTC+3 (EEST)
- Postal code: 62701
- Area code: +380 5750
- KOATUU code: 6321885502
- KATOTTH code: None

Horobivka (Ukrainian: Гороб'ївка, Russian: Горобьевка, romanized: Gorobievka) is a village in Kupiansk Raion, Kharkiv Oblast, Ukraine. In 2001, it had a population of 263 people. It is located 17 kilometres (11 mi) northeast of Kupiansk. As of May 2023, the village is currently fully occupied by Russian forces during their invasion of Ukraine.

== History ==
=== 2020 Kharkiv Oblast forest fire ===
In September 2020, the village almost completely burned down as a result of a forest fire in the wider Kharkiv region. The residents were evacuated. 22 houses were destroyed, leaving 33 people homeless.

=== 2022 Russian invasion of Ukraine ===
It was occupied by the Russian Armed Forces as part of the 2022 Russian invasion of Ukraine. On 24 September 2022, it was reported by Russian milbloggers that Ukrainian forces had recaptured the village as part of their wider counteroffensive in the Kharkiv region. Over the course of the next month, Russia made efforts to recapture the territory it lost in northeast Kharkiv Oblast, including Horobivka. On 18 October 2022, an official from the self-proclaimed Luhansk People's Republic first claimed that Russian forces had recaptured Horobivka. The village As of May 2023 is still currently occupied by Russian forces.

== Demographics ==
In 2001, the village had 263 inhabitants. Of these, 243 spoke Ukrainian, and 20 spoke Russian.

== See also ==
List of nearby settlements

- Hrianykivka
- Tavilzhanka
- Dvorichne
- Dvorichna
- Masiutivka
