= Vodiane =

Vodiane (Ukrainian: Водяне) may refer to several villages in Ukraine:

- Vodiane, Mariupol Raion, Donetsk Oblast
- Vodiane, Pokrovsk Raion, Donetsk Oblast
- Vodiane, Volnovakha Raion, Donetsk Oblast
- Zymna Voda, Lviv Oblast; known as Vodiane from 1946 to 1990
- Vodiane, Znamianka urban hromada, Kirovohrad Oblast
- Vodiane, Dvorichna settlement hromada, Kupiansk Raion, Kharkiv Oblast

== See also ==
- Vodiane rural hromada (disambiguation)
