= Tokarivka, Kupiansk Raion, Kharkiv Oblast =

Village in Kharkiv Oblast, Ukraine

Tokarivka Токарівка
- Village
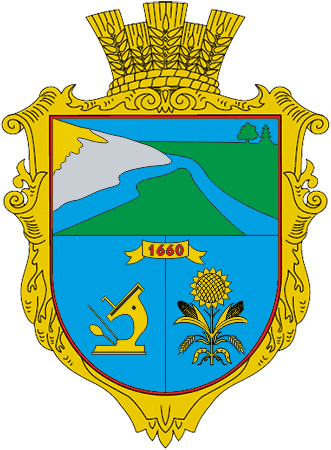
- Coat of arms
- Interactive map of Tokarivka
- Location of Tokarivka within Ukraine Tokarivka (Ukraine)
- Coordinates: 49.79°N 37.911667°E
- Country: Ukraine
- Oblast: Kharkiv Oblast
- Raion: Kupiansk Raion
- Hromada: Dvorichna settlement hromada
- Founded: 1925

Area
  - Total: 0.882 km^{2} (0.341 sq mi)
- Elevation: 165 m (541 ft)

Population (2001 census)
  - Total: 489
  - Density: 554/km^{2} (1,440/sq mi)
- Time zone: UTC+2 (EET)
  - Summer (DST): UTC+3 (EEST)
- Postal code: 62743
- Area code: +380 5750
- KATOTTH: UA63080050500042426

Tokarivka (Ukrainian: Токарівка; Russian: Токаревка) is a village in Dvorichna settlement hromada, Kupiansk Raion, Kharkiv Oblast, Ukraine. It is located 117.55 kilometres (73.04 mi) east by south (EbS) of the centre of Kharkiv city.

== History ==
The settlement was founded in 1925.

=== Russian invasion ===
The village was occupied by Russian troops on 24 February 2022 as part of the Russian invasion of Ukraine and has been under Russian occupation since.

== Demographics ==
As of the 2001 Ukrainian census, the settlement had 489 inhabitants, whose native languages were 90.02% Ukrainian, 9.78% Russian and 0.20% Belarusian.
