= Topoli =

Topoli may refer to:

== Settlements ==
=== Bulgaria ===
- Topoli, Bulgaria, a town in Varna Province
- Topoli Dol, a village in Pazardzhik Province

=== Kazakhstan ===
- Oteshkali Atambaev, known as Topoli until 2006

=== Russia ===
- Topoli, Belgorod Oblast, a khutor in Belgorod Oblast
- Topoli, Krasnodar Krai, a khutor in Krasnodar Krai

=== Ukraine ===
- Topoli, Cherkasy Oblast, a village
- Topoli, Chernihiv Oblast, a village
- Topoli, Crimea, a village
- Topoli (rural-type settlement), in Kharkiv Oblast
  - Topoli (border checkpoint), in Kharkiv Oblast
- Topoli (village), Kharkiv Oblast
- Topoli, Kirovohrad Oblast, a village
- Topoli, Luhansk Oblast, a village

== Other uses ==
- Topoli (film)
