= Kharkiv Oblast campaign (2024–present) order of battle =

This is the order of battle for the Kharkiv Oblast campaign (2024–present) of the eastern front of the Russian invasion of Ukraine

== Russian forces ==
=== Kupiansk front ===
- Russian Armed Forces
  - Russian Ground Forces
    - Moscow Military District
      - 1st Guards Tank Army
        - 2nd Motorized Rifle Division
          - 1st Motorized Tank Regiment
          - 1st Motorized Rifle Regiment
          - 15th Motorized Rifle Regiment
        - 4th Guards Tank Division
          - 12th Tank Regiment
        - 27th Motorized Rifle Brigade
        - 47th Tank Division
          - 272nd Motorized Rifle Regiment
          - 375th Separate Anti-Tank Artillery Battalion
      - 20th Combined Arms Army
    - Leningrad Military District
      - 6th Combined Arms Army
        - 9th Artillery Brigade
        - 25th Motorized Rifle Brigade
        - 69th Motorized Rifle Division
          - 344th Motorized Rifle Regiment
          - 350th Motorized Rifle Regiment
        - 11th Army Corps
          - 7th Motorized Rifle Regiment
  - Main Intelligence Directorate
    - Special Forces of the Main Directorate
      - 16th Spetsnaz Brigade

=== Izium front ===
Russian Armed Forces

- Russian Ground Forces
  - Moscow Military District
    - 1st Guards Tank Army
      - 4th Guards Tank Division
        - 12th Tank Regiment
        - 423rd Motorized Rifle Regiment
    - 20th Combined Arms Army
      - 3rd Motorized Rifle Division
        - 237th Tank Regiment
        - 252nd Motor Rifle Regiment
        - 752nd Motorized Rifle Regiment
  - Leningrad Military District
    - 6th Combined Arms Army
      - 25th Motorized Rifle Brigade
- Main Intelligence Directorate
  - Special Forces of the Main Directorate
    - 16th Spetsnaz Brigade

=== Bohodukhiv, Chuhuiv, and Kharkiv fronts ===
- 6th Combined Arms Army (elements)
  - 68th Guards Motor Rifle Division
  - 69th Guards Motor Rifle Division
  - 1009th Motor Rifle Regiment (elements)
- 11th Army Corps (majority)
  - 18th Guards Motor Rifle Division (elements)
    - 11th Tank Regiment elements
    - 79th Motor Rifle Regiment
  - 7th Motor Rifle Regiment elements
- 44th Army Corps (majority)
  - 128th Motor Rifle Brigade elements
  - 72nd Motor Rifle Division elements
  - 30th Motor Rifle Regiment elements
  - 41st Motor Rifle Regiment elements
- 155th Naval Infantry Brigade
- 810th Guards Naval Infantry Brigade elements
- 83rd Guards Air Assault Brigade
- 136th Guards Motor Rifle Brigade
- 2nd Guards Spetsnaz Brigade
- 47th Tank Division elements
  - 380th Motor Rifle Regiment elements
  - 245th Motor Rifle Regiment (elements)
  - 153rd Tank Regiment (elements)
    - "Storm" detachment
  - 4th Volunteer Reconnaissance and Assault Brigade elements
- 18th Mechanized Brigade elements
- 1008th Motor Rifle Regiment elements
- "Phoenix" special mining battalion, 11th Engineering Brigade
- Akhmat Spetsnaz elements
  - "Vakha" battalion elements
  - "Aida" group elements
  - Zapad-Akhmat Battalion
  - Akhmat Bati Spetsnaz
  - "Okhotnik" detachment elements
    - "Canada" group elements
  - 204th Akhmat Spetsnaz Regiment
    - Izi Group
- 9th Separate Guards Motor Rifle Brigade, 51st Guards Combined Arms Army (elements)
- "Antagonist" drone detachment
- National Guard of Russia
  - 116th Special Purpose Brigade
  - Stal'naya Brigade
- Storm-Z units
- Africa Corps elements
- Ministry of defense
  - Sheikh Mansur volunteer battalion

== Ukrainian forces ==
=== Kupiansk front ===
- Armed Forces of Ukraine
  - Ukrainian Ground Forces
    - Operational Command North
      - 10th Army Corps
        - 116th Mechanized Brigade
      - 30th Mechanized Brigade
    - Operational Command East
      - 92nd Assault Brigade
        - 429th Separate Regiment of Unmanned Aerial Systems
      - 43rd Mechanized Brigade
    - Operational Command West
      - 14th Mechanized Brigade
      - 10th Mountain Assault Brigade
        - 8th Mountain Assault Infantry Battalion
    - Operational Command South
      - 40th Artillery Brigade
  - Ukrainian Air Assault Forces
    - 77th Airmobile Brigade
  - Unmanned Systems Forces
    - 412th Unmanned Aerial Vehicle Regiment
  - Territorial Defence Forces
    - 114th Territorial Defense Brigade
- Ministry of Internal Affairs
  - State Border Guard Service
    - Pomsta Brigade
      - Phoenix Regiment of Unmanned Systems
  - National Guard of Ukraine
    - Offensive Guard
      - 15th Operational Brigade
        - 2nd Operational Battalion
      - 1st Presidential Operational Brigade

=== Chuhuiv and Kharkiv fronts ===
- 3rd Assault Brigade
- 36th Marine Brigade
- 57th Motorised Brigade
- 71st Jaeger Brigade
- 82nd Air Assault Brigade (starting 12 May 2024)
- 116th Mechanized Brigade
- Liut Brigade
- Russian Volunteer Corps
- Active Action unit "Kraken"
- Freikorps
- 101st Guard Brigade Of General Staff
- 13th Khartiia Brigade
- 42nd Mechanised Brigade
- 92nd Assault Brigade

== See also ==
- Kupiansk offensive
- Northern Kharkiv Oblast front of the Russo-Ukrainian war
- List of orders of battle
