= Vodiane, Dvorichna settlement hromada, Kupiansk Raion, Kharkiv Oblast =

Village in Ukraine

Vodiane Водяне
- Village
- Interactive map of Vodiane
- Location of Vodiane within Ukraine Vodiane (Ukraine)
- Coordinates: 49.935°N 37.585°E
- Country: Ukraine
- Oblast: Kharkiv Oblast
- Raion: Kupiansk Raion
- Hromada: Dvorichna settlement hromada
- Founded: 1700

Area
  - Total: 0.244 km^{2} (0.094 sq mi)
- Elevation: 174 m (571 ft)

Population (2001 census)
  - Total: 75
  - Density: 310/km^{2} (800/sq mi)
- Time zone: UTC+2 (EET)
  - Summer (DST): UTC+3 (EEST)
- Postal code: 62720
- Area code: +380 5750
- KATOTTH: UA63080050080069475

Vodiane (Ukrainian: Водяне; Russian: Водяное) is a village in Kupiansk Raion, Kharkiv Oblast, eastern Ukraine, located 91.80 kilometres (57.04 mi) east by south (EbS) of the centre of Kharkiv city. It belongs to Dvorichna settlement hromada, one of the hromadas of Ukraine.

== History ==
The settlement was founded in 1700.

=== Russian invasion ===
The village was temporarily occupied by Russian troops on 24 February 2022.

== Demographics ==
As of the 2001 Ukrainian census, the settlement had 75 inhabitants, whose native languages were 98.67% Ukrainian and 1.33% Russian.
