= Stroivka =

Stroivka (Ukrainian: Строївка) may refer to the following places in Ukraine:

- Stroivka, Chernihiv Oblast, a village in Chernihiv Raion
- Stroivka, Kharkiv Oblast, a village in Kupiansk Raion
