= Kamianka, Dvorichna settlement hromada, Kupiansk Raion, Kharkiv Oblast =

Village in Kupiansk Raion, Ukraine

Kamianka Кам'янка
- Village
- Interactive map of Kamianka
- Location of Kamianka within Ukraine Kamianka (Kharkiv Oblast)
- Coordinates: 49.979722°N 37.841111°E
- Country: Ukraine
- Oblast: Kharkiv Oblast
- Raion: Kupiansk Raion
- Hromada: Dvorichna settlement hromada
- Established: 1675

Area
  - Total: 2.962 km^{2} (1.144 sq mi)
- Elevation: 90 m (300 ft)

Population (2023)
  - Total: 10
  - Density: 3.4/km^{2} (8.7/sq mi)
- Time zone: UTC+2 (EET)
  - Summer (DST): UTC+3 (EEST)
- Postal code: 62710
- Area code: +380 5750
- KATOTTH: UA63080050160094886

Kamianka (Ukrainian: Кам'янка; Russian: Каменка) is a village in the Kupiansk Raion of Kharkiv Oblast in eastern Ukraine, at about 108.93 kilometres (67.69 mi) east by north (EbN) of the centre of Kharkiv city. It belongs to Dvorichna settlement hromada, one of the hromadas of Ukraine.

== Geography ==
The village is located on the right bank of the Oskil River.

== History ==
The settlement was established in 1675.

=== Russo-Ukrainian War ===
The village was occupied by Russian troops on 24 February 2022. By the end of October, the same year, the village was recaptured by Ukrainian forces.

On 28 April 2025, Russia claimed to have recaptured the village, Ukraine denied the claims.

== Demographics ==
As of the 2001 Ukrainian census, the settlement had 968 inhabitants, whose native languages were 89.18% Ukrainian, 10.20% Russian, 0.31% Belarusian and 0.10% Armenian, Moldovan (Romanian) and German.
