= Tavilzhanka =

Village in Kharkiv Oblast, Ukraine

Tavilzhanka Тавільжанка
- Village
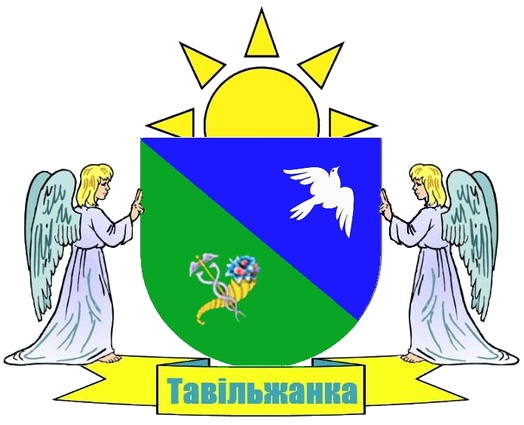
- Coat of arms
- Interactive map of Tavilzhanka
- Location within Kharkiv Oblast Location within Ukraine
- Coordinates: 49°50′20″N 37°46′34″E
- Country: Ukraine
- Oblast: Kharkiv Oblast
- Raion: Kupiansk Raion
- Hromada: Dvorichna settlement hromada
- Founded: 1899

Government
  - Type: Dvorichna Settlement Council
  - Head: Svitlana Moroz

Area
  - Total: 3,312 km^{2} (1,279 sq mi)
- Elevation: 105 m (344 ft)

Population
  - Total: 1,924
  - Density: 0.5809/km^{2} (1.505/sq mi)
- Time zone: UTC+2 (EET)
  - Summer (DST): UTC+3 (EEST)
- Postal code: 62731
- Area code: +380 5750
- KOATUU code: 6321885501
- KATOTTH code: UA63080050480092705

Tavilzhanka (Ukrainian: Тавільжанка, Russian: Таволжанка, romanized: Tavolzhanka) is a village in Kupiansk Raion, Kharkiv Oblast, Ukraine. It belongs to Dvorichna settlement hromada, one of the hromadas of Ukraine. During the Russian invasion of Ukraine, the village was occupied by Russian troops. After the success of the 2022 Kharkiv counteroffensive, the village has become contested territory on the frontline.

== Geography ==
The village is surrounded by large areas of forests alongside the Tavilzhanka (river). After one kilometer, this river connects to the left tributary of the larger Oskil (river), downstream from the village of Dvorichne, where the closest major railway station, Dvorichna station, is located.

== History ==
=== Russian invasion of Ukraine ===
After the beginning of the Russian invasion of Ukraine, Tavilzhanka was occupied by Russian troops. Svitlana Moroz, the village head, was held by Russian forces in a prison in Kupiansk. She eventually escaped, but her husband has not been seen since September 2022.

On 22 September 2022, prominent Russian milblogger Rybar reported that the Ukrainian armed forces reached and began fighting for the village in part of their Kharkiv counteroffensive, which had begun earlier in the month. Advancing from Horobivka and Dvorichna, further progress was made on 25 September by the Ukrainian forces when a foothold was established by nearby railroad tracks in the village. From 25 to 27 September, further fighting reported as "intense" took place in the western part of the village.

Over the following months, it has remained a contested frontline village during the battle of the Svatove–Kreminna line.

== Demographics ==
In 2001, the village had 1924 residents, of whom 1792 spoke Ukrainian, 108 Russian, 5 Hungarian, 3 Belarusian, 9 Armenian, and 7 spoke other languages.

Native languages in Tavilzhanka
	percent
Ukrainian	93.1%
Russian	5.6%
Armenian	0.5%
Hungarian	0.3%
Belarusian	0.2%
others	0.4%

== See also ==
Nearby settlements

- Dvorichna
- Dvorichne
- Horobivka
- Hrianykivka
