= Novoiehorivka, Kupiansk Raion, Kharkiv Oblast =

Novoyehorivka Новоєгорівка
- Village
- Location within Kharkiv Oblast Location within Ukraine
- Coordinates: 49°50′25″N 37°57′55″E
- Country: Ukraine
- Oblast: Kharkiv Oblast
- Raion: Kupiansk Raion
- Rural settlement: Dvorichna settlement hromada
- Founded: 1900

Population
  - Total: 535
- Postal code: 62740
- Area code: +380 5750

Novoyehorivka (Ukrainian: Новоєго́рівка) is a village in Ukraine, located in Dvorichna settlement hromada, Kupiansk Raion, Kharkiv Oblast.

On 12 June 2020, in accordance with administrative reforms in Ukraine, Novoyehorivka was included in the newly formed Dvorichna settlement hromada. On 17 July 2020, Dvorichna Raion as a whole was abolished and its territory transferred to Kupiansk Raion, including Novoyehorivka.

== Demographics ==
As of the 2001 Ukrainian census, the Novoyehorivka counted a population of 535 inhabitants. The linguistic composition was as follows:

Native languages in Novoyehorivka
	percent
Ukrainian	87.7%
Russian	11.9%
Romanian	0.4%
others	0.0%
