= Bohuslavka =

Bohuslavka (Ukrainian: Богуславка) may refer to the following places in Ukraine:

- Bohuslavka, Izium Raion, Kharkiv Oblast
- Bohuslavka, Synelnykove Raion, Dnipropetrovsk Oblast

== See also ==
- Maria Bohuslavka
