= Zapadne =

Village in Kharkiv Oblast, Ukraine

Zapadne Западне
- Village
- Interactive map of Zapadne
- Location of Zapadne within Ukraine Zapadne (Ukraine)
- Coordinates: 49.821389°N 37.616667°E
- Country: Ukraine
- Oblast: Kharkiv Oblast
- Raion: Kupiansk Raion
- Hromada: Dvorichna settlement hromada
- Founded: 1902

Area
  - Total: 0.91 km^{2} (0.35 sq mi)
- Elevation: 137 m (449 ft)

Population (2001 census)
  - Total: 345
  - Density: 380/km^{2} (980/sq mi)
- Time zone: UTC+2 (EET)
  - Summer (DST): UTC+3 (EEST)
- Postal code: 62709
- Area code: +380 5750
- KATOTTH: UA63080050140097441

Zapadne (Ukrainian: Западне; Russian: Западное) is a village in Kupiansk Raion, Kharkiv Oblast, eastern Ukraine, located 96.05 kilometres (59.68 mi) east by south (EbS) from the centre of Kharkiv city. It belongs to Dvorichna settlement hromada.

== History ==
During the Russian invasion of Ukraine, the village changed hands multiple times. It was recaptured by Russian forces in early 2025.

== Demographics ==
As of the 2001 Ukrainian census, the settlement had 345 inhabitants, whose native languages were 95.71% Ukrainian and 4.29% Russian.
