= Stroivka, Kharkiv Oblast =

Village in Kharkiv Oblast, Ukraine

Stroivka Строївка
- Village
- Interactive map of Stroivka
- Location within Kharkiv Oblast Location within Ukraine
- Coordinates: 50°02′31″N 37°52′40″E
- Country: Ukraine
- Oblast: Kharkiv Oblast
- Raion: Kupiansk Raion

Population (2001)
  - Total: 31
- Postal code: 62712

Stroivka (Ukrainian: Строївка) is a village in Kupiansk Raion, Kharkiv Oblast, Ukraine, close to the border with Russia. It belongs to Dvorichna settlement hromada, one of the hromadas of Ukraine.

Until 18 July 2020, Stroivka belonged to Dvorichna Raion. The raion was abolished in July 2020 as part of the administrative reform of Ukraine, which reduced the number of raions of Kharkiv Oblast to seven. The area of Dvorichna Raion was merged into Kupiansk Raion.

Stroivka was occupied by Russian forces in the 2022 Russian invasion of Ukraine. They withdrew in September 2022 during Ukraine's Kharkiv counteroffensive. Due to heavy mining, Stroivka and the neighbouring village of Topoli remained empty in no man's land until September 2023, when Ukrainian forces cleared a path through the mines and re-entered the villages. Russia recaptured the settlement on 29 May 2025.
