= Sotnytskyi Kozachok =

Sotnytskyi Kozachok Сотницький Козачок
- Village
- Location within Kharkiv Oblast Location within Ukraine
- Coordinates: 50°25′59″N 35°54′53″E
- Country: Ukraine
- Oblast: Kharkiv Oblast
- Raion: Bohodukhiv Raion
- Year Founded: 1675
- Time zone: UTC+2 (EET)
  - Summer (DST): UTC+3 (EEST)
- Postal Code: 62212
- KOATUU: 6322682004
- Area Code: +380 5764

Sotnytskyi Kozachok (Ukrainian: Сотницький Козачок) is a village in eastern Ukraine, belonging to Bohodukhiv Raion of Kharkiv Oblast. The population is 26 as of 2024.

== History ==
In 1932-1933, during the Holodomor, a total of 315 villages died as a result of the man-made famine.

During the 2024 Kharkiv offensive, the Russian forces attempted to advance onto the village from the border, but were pushed back.

On November 16, 2024, Russian milbloggers claimed that Russian forces had captured the border, however, this was not verified by the Institute for the Study of War or any independent source.

== Administrative division ==
On June 12, 2020, following a resolution from the Cabinet of Ministers of Ukraine, the village became a part of the Zolochiv settlement hromada.

In July 2020, the village became a part of Bohodukhiv Raion after the Ukrainian parliament approved a series of administrative reforms.
