= Fyholivka =

Village in Kharkiv Oblast, Ukraine

Fyholivka Фиголівка
- Village
- Interactive map of Fyholivka
- Location of Fyholivka within Ukraine Fyholivka (Ukraine)
- Coordinates: 49.9°N 37.704722°E
- Country: Ukraine
- Oblast: Kharkiv Oblast
- Raion: Kupiansk Raion
- Hromada: Dvorichna settlement hromada
- Founded: 1832

Area
  - Total: 0.353 km^{2} (0.136 sq mi)
- Elevation: 82 m (269 ft)

Population (2022)
  - Total: 46
  - Density: 130/km^{2} (340/sq mi)
- Time zone: UTC+2 (EET)
  - Summer (DST): UTC+3 (EEST)
- Postal code: 62720
- Area code: +380 5750

Fyholivka (Ukrainian: Фиголівка; Russian: Фиголевка) is a village in Kupiansk Raion, Kharkiv Oblast, eastern Ukraine, located 100.81 kilometres (62.64 mi) east by south (EbS) of the centre of Kharkiv city. It forms part of Dvorichna settlement hromada.

== History ==
The settlement was founded in 1832.

=== Russian invasion of Ukraine ===
During the early months of the Russian invasion of Ukraine in 2022, Fyholivka was located within a Russian-controlled part of Kharkiv Oblast, which returned to Ukrainian control as part of a September 2022 Ukrainian offensive.

It was reported that Russian forces were attempting to infiltrate the Fyholivka area on 22 February 2023.

The village was recaptured by Russian forces on 6 February 2025.

== Demographics ==
As of the 2001 Ukrainian census, the settlement had 104 inhabitants, whose native languages were 89.42% Ukrainian, 8.65% Russian and 1.92% Belarusian.
