= Vodiane rural hromada =

Vodiane rural hromada (Ukrainian: Водянська сільська громада) may refer to one of two hromadas of Ukraine:

- Vodiane rural hromada, Zaporizhzhia Oblast
- Vodiane rural hromada, Cherkasy Oblast
