= Bohuslavka, Izium Raion, Kharkiv Oblast =

Village in Kharkiv Oblast, Ukraine

Bohuslavka Богуславка
- Village
- Interactive map of Bohuslavka
- Bohuslavka in Kharkiv Oblast Bohuslavka (Ukraine)
- Coordinates: 49.474722°N 37.683611°E
- Country: Ukraine
- Oblast: Kharkiv Oblast
- Raion: Izium Raion
- Founded: 1785

Area
  - Total: 3.127 km^{2} (1.207 sq mi)
- Elevation: 81 m (266 ft)

Population (2001 census)
  - Total: 1,321
  - Density: 422.4/km^{2} (1,094/sq mi)
- Time zone: UTC+2 (EET)
  - Summer (DST): UTC+3 (EEST)
- Postal code: 63810
- Area code: +380 5759

Bohuslavka (Ukrainian: Богуславка; Russian: Богуславка) is a village in Izium Raion (district) in Kharkiv Oblast of eastern Ukraine, at about 115.4 kilometres (71.7 mi) east-southeast (ESE) from the centre of Kharkiv city. It is the administrative centre of the Boguslavka village council, which also includes the villages of Zagrizove, Lozova and Nova Kruhliakivka. The village is on the left (eastern) bank of the Oskil Reservoir.

The settlement came under attack by Russian forces in 2022, during the Russian invasion of Ukraine and was regained by Ukrainian forces by the beginning of October the same year.
