= Dvorichna =

Rural settlement in Kharkiv Oblast, Ukraine

Dvorichna Дворічна
- Rural settlement
- Coat of arms
- Interactive map of Dvorichna
- Location within Kharkiv Oblast Location within Ukraine
- Coordinates: 49°51′N 37°40′E
- Country: Ukraine
- Oblast: Kharkiv Oblast
- Raion: Kupiansk Raion
- Hromada: Dvorichna settlement hromada
- Founded: 1660

Area
  - Total: 4.04 km^{2} (1.56 sq mi)
- Elevation: 88 m (289 ft)

Population (2024)
  - Total: 80(4,491 as of 2,001)
  - Density: 20/km^{2} (51/sq mi)
- Time zone: UTC+2 (EET)
  - Summer (DST): UTC+3 (EEST)
- Postal code: 62709
- Area code: +380 5750

Dvorichna (Ukrainian: Дворічна, pronounced [dwoˈr⁽ʲ⁾itʃnɐ]) is a rural settlement in Kupiansk Raion, Kharkiv Oblast, Ukraine. It hosts the administration of Dvorichna settlement hromada, one of the hromadas of Ukraine. During the Russian invasion of Ukraine, the town was captured by Russian forces, but was recaptured by Ukrainian forces in September 2022 during a major counteroffensive in Kharkiv Oblast. As of 28 January 2025, the town is under Russian control.

== History ==
In July 1931, the town began publishing its own local newspaper, which it still continues to do today.

In 1960, the town became classified as an urban-type settlement. This remained until 26 January 2024, when a new law entered into force which abolished this status, and Dvorichna became a rural settlement.

Until 18 July 2020, Dvorichna was the administrative center of Dvorichna Raion. The raion was abolished in July 2020 as part of the administrative reform of Ukraine, which reduced the number of raions in Kharkiv Oblast to seven. The area of Dvorichna Raion was merged into Kupiansk Raion.

=== Russian invasion of Ukraine ===
It has been reported that Dvorichna came under Russian occupation on 24 February 2022, the first day of the Russian invasion of Ukraine. On 11 September 2022, the settlement returned to Ukrainian control during the 2022 Ukrainian Kharkiv counteroffensive. After the recapture, however, the town still remained relatively close to the frontline, and as a result had the population of the town fell from 3,500 before the war to 80 as of February 2024, and 80% of the buildings in the town had become damaged to some degree, including all 35 apartment buildings.

By December 2024, the settlement was contested by Russian forces as part of renewed offensive operations to cross the Oskil river. By 13 January 2025, Russian forces had expanded their bridgehead along the Oskil River near Dvorichna and captured around half of the village. On 28 January, the Russian defense ministry said that the settlement had been fully recaptured by its forces.

== Population ==
The population of the town has been counted three times; once in January 1989, where the population was recorded at 4,807 people, again in January 2013, where the population was recorded at 3,812 people. and most recently in 2022, when the population was estimated to be around 3,290 (2022 estimate). The linguistic composition of the settlement as of the 2001 Ukrainian census was as follows:

First languages in Dvorichna
	percent
Ukrainian	88.6%
Russian	10.3%
Belarusian	0.5%
Romanian	0.1%
others	0.3%

== See also ==
List of nearby settlements

- Hrianykivka
- Dvorichne
- Horobivka
- Tavilzhanka
