= Dvorichna Raion =

Former subdivision of Kharkiv Oblast, Ukraine

Dvorichna Raion Дворічанський район
- Raion
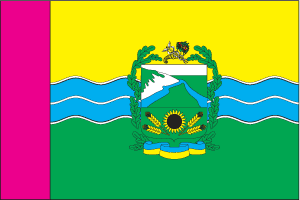
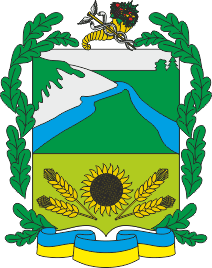
- Flag Coat of arms

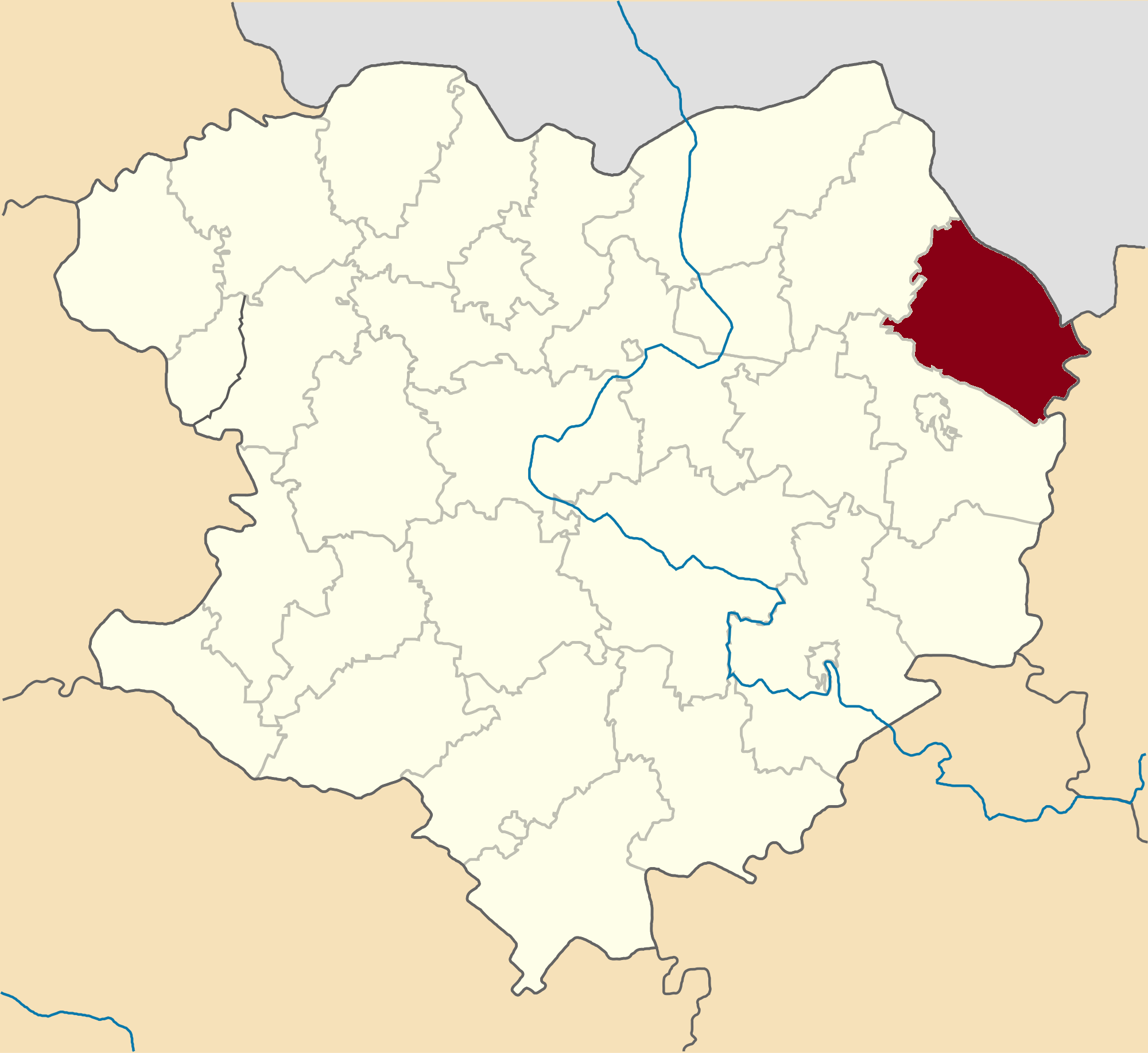
- Raion location in Kharkiv Oblast
- Coordinates: 49°54′11.25″N 37°47′41.8992″E
- Country: Ukraine
- Oblast: Kharkiv Oblast
- Disestablished: 18 July 2020
- Administrative center: Dvorichna

Area
  - Total: 1,112.35 km^{2} (429.48 sq mi)

Population (2020)
  - Total: 16,568
  - Density: 14.895/km^{2} (38.577/sq mi)
- Time zone: UTC+2 (EET)
  - Summer (DST): UTC+3 (EEST)
- Website: dvorichna-rda.softbi.info

Dvorichna Raion (Ukrainian: Дворічанський район) was a raion (district) in Kharkiv Oblast of Ukraine. Its administrative center was the urban-type settlement of Dvorichna. The raion was abolished on 18 July 2020 as part of the administrative reform of Ukraine, which reduced the number of raions of Kharkiv Oblast to seven. The area of Dvorichna Raion was merged into Kupiansk Raion. The last estimate of the raion population was 16,568 (2020 est.)

At the time of disestablishment, the raion consisted of one hromada, Dvorichna settlement hromada with the administration in Dvorichna.
