= Classification of objects of the administrative-territorial system of Ukraine =

Classification of objects of the administrative-territorial system of Ukraine (KOATUU) (Ukrainian: Класифікатор об'єктів адміністративно-територіального устрою України, КОАТУУ), was a national standardization system established by the State Committee for Technical Regulation and Consumer Policy on October 31, 1997, and went into effect on January 1, 1998.

KOATUU was directly inherited from and replaced the old Soviet system SOATO of the Soviet standard system GOST, without major structural changes (although there were some nomenclatural modifications). KOATUU is numbered as DK 014-97 in the system of classification and coding of technical-economical and social information in Ukraine (abbreviated as DSK TESI).

The classification is conducted by the Scientific Research Institute of Statistics of the State Statistics Committee of Ukraine. DK 014-97 (KOATUU) is planned to be integrated in the International Organization for Standardization and to follow the designated system for Ukraine, ISO 3166-2:UA.

Following the passage of laws on administrative reform on 17 July 2020, KOATUU became outdated and was deprecated. In response, the Ministry of Development of Communities and Territories developed a new system to replace KOATUU called the Codifier of Administrative Territorial Units and Territories of Territorial Communities, which was approved on 26 November 2020.

== See also ==
- Population and housing censuses by country
- List of administrative divisions by country
