= Oskil =

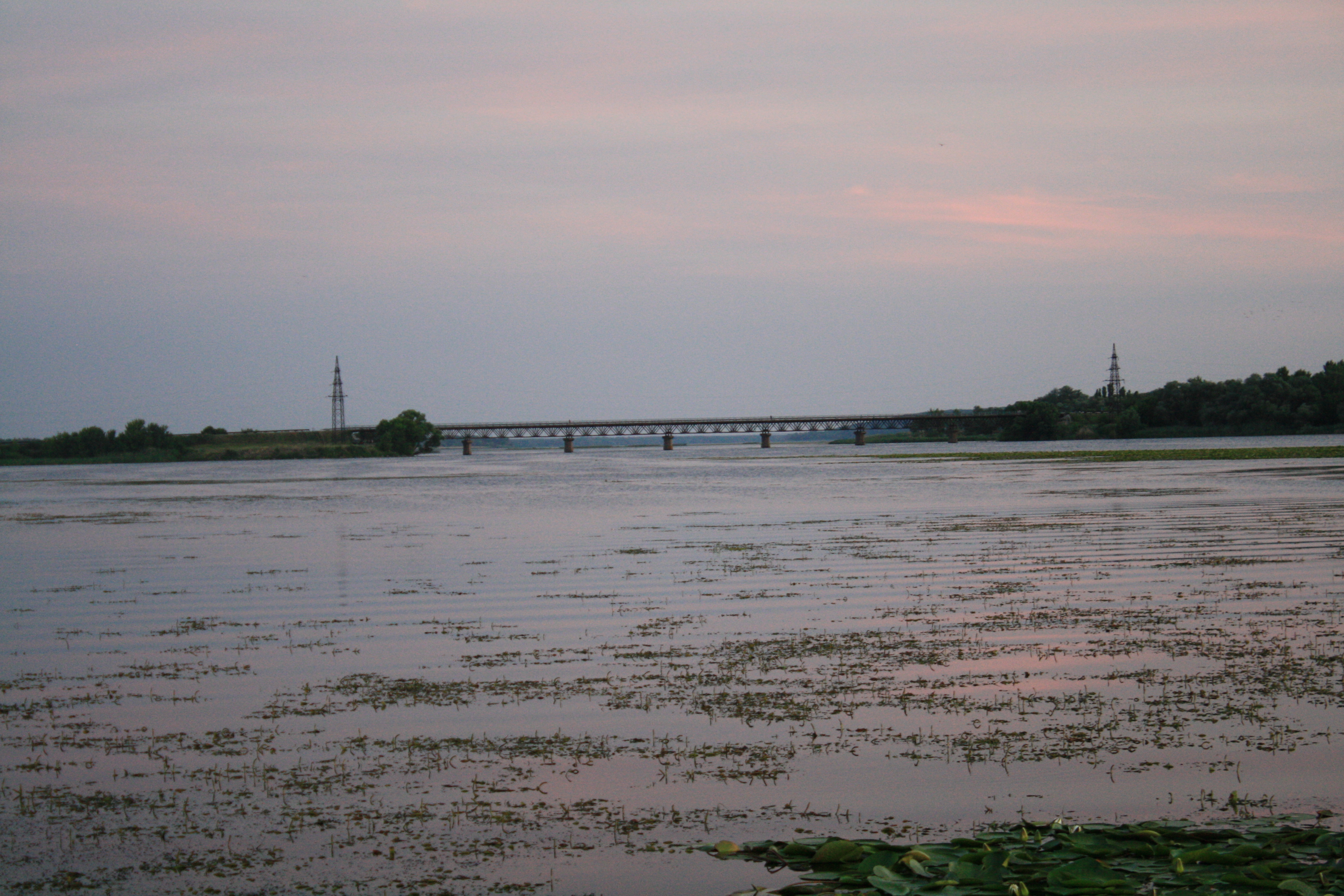
- Oskil near Kruhliakivka

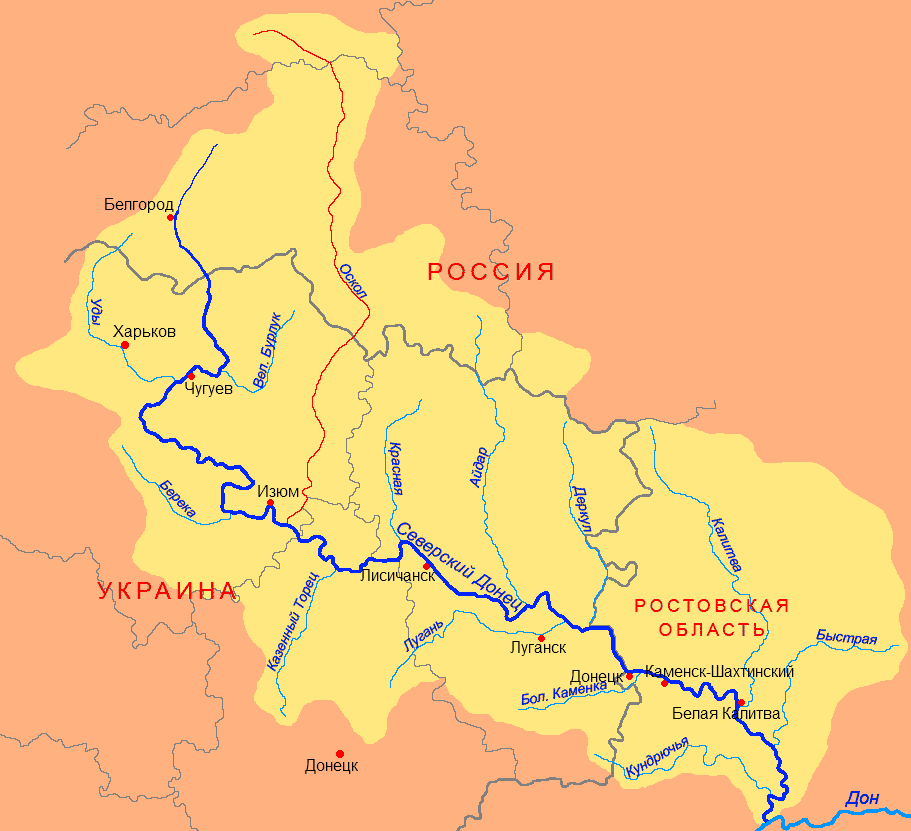
- Donets river basin. The Oskil (red) is the northernmost large tributary
- Native name: Оскол (Russian); Оскiл (Ukrainian)

Location
- Country: Russia, Ukraine

Physical characteristics
- Mouth: Donets
  - coordinates: 49.1001°N 37.4087°E
- Length: 472 km (293 mi)
- Basin size: 14,800 km^{2} (5,700 sq mi)

Basin features
- Progression: Donets→ Don→ Sea of Azov

The Oskil or Oskol (Ukrainian: Оскiл; Russian: Оскол) is a south-flowing river in Russia and Ukraine. It arises roughly between Kursk and Voronezh and flows south to join the Siverskyi Donets which flows southeast to join the Don. It is 472 kilometres (293 mi) long, with a drainage basin of 14,800 square kilometres (5,700 sq mi).

The river has its sources on the Central Russian Upland, and flows through Kursk and Belgorod Oblasts in Russia, and through the eastern part of Kharkiv Oblast in Ukraine, where it joins the Seversky Donets river. An artificial lake, the Oskil Reservoir, was created in 1958 to help with flood protection and as a source of electricity.

There are several towns along the Oskil: Stary Oskol, Novy Oskol and Valuyki in Russia, and Kupiansk, Kupiansk-Vuzlovyi, Kivsharivka, Borova and Dvorichna in Ukraine.

== History ==
=== Russo-Ukrainian war ===
On March 31, 2022, during the Russian invasion of Ukraine, the Oskil Dam was destroyed. In September 2022, to resist the 2022 Ukrainian Kharkiv counteroffensive, Russian forces unsuccessfully used the Oskil River as a defensive barrier, only managing to hold a small portion of territory along the river in northeastern Kharkiv oblast.

Following the counteroffensive, the frontline stalled along the northeastern sector of the river in Ukraine. However, in late 2024, Russian forces restarted offensive operations in the area, making several attempts to recross the Oskil river. On January 9, 2025, Russian forces successfully established a bridgehead across the Oskil river, southeast of Dvorichna. Following this, Russian forces steadily advanced across the river, eventually capturing Dvorichna, and using their bridgehead as a launch post for advancing onto Kupiansk.
