= Codifier of administrative-territorial units and territories of territorial communities =

In Ukraine, the Codifier of administrative-territorial units and territories of territorial communities (Ukrainian: Кодифікатор адміністративно-територіальних одиниць та територій територіальних громад), for short KATOTTH (КАТОТТГ) is a national register of the administrative divisions of Ukraine and the territory of hromadas (communities) of the country, introduced on 26 November 2020 in accordance with an edict of Ministry of Communities and Territories Development to replace the previous classification of objects of the administrative-territorial system of Ukraine (KOATUU) system.

It is a consequence of the administrative reforms of the country that began in 2015, in which settlements in neighboring village, settlement, and city councils were gradually united into territorial hromadas, and the number of raions (districts) was reduced from 490 to 136.

== Structure ==
The administrative-territorial units are divided into five levels:

1. First level: the oblast, autonomous republic, or city with special status
2. Second level: the raion
3. Third level: the hromada
4. Fourth level: the specific populated place; cities, villages, rural settlements
5. Additional level: urban districts (including in cities with special status)

The units are also divided by category, each with its own one-letter abbreviation in the Latin alphabet. The following list is per the levels mentioned before and within the KATOTTH:

- First level: O (oblast or autonomous republic) and K (city with special status)
- Second level: P (raion)
- Third level: H (hromada)
- Fourth level: M (city), ~~T (urban-type settlement prior to 2021)~~, X (rural settlement), and C (village)
- Fifth level: B (urban district)

The KATOTTH code itself takes the form (Cyrillic lettering):

UA|ОО|РР|ГГГ|ППП|ММ|УУУУУ

- UA is just "UA", the ISO 3166-1 code for Ukraine
- OO is the code of the first-level division
- РР is the code of the second-level division
- ГГГ is the code of the third-level division
- ППП is the code of the populated place
- ММ is the code of the urban district
- УУУУУ is a unique key of the object

== Examples ==
- UA74000000000025378; Chernihiv Oblast
- UA46140000000036328; Yavoriv Raion, Lviv Oblast
- UA71020270000021083; Stebliv settlement hromada
- UA32120070080094229; The village Novi Bezradychi
- UA80000000000210193; Darnytskyi District, Kyiv

== See also ==
- Administrative-territorial reform in Ukraine
- ISO 3166
- ISO 3166-2
