= Kupiansk Raion =

Subdivision of Kharkiv Oblast, Ukraine

Kupiansk Raion Куп'янський район
- Raion
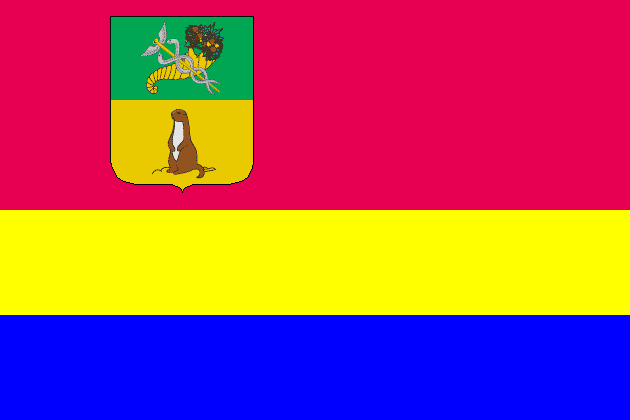
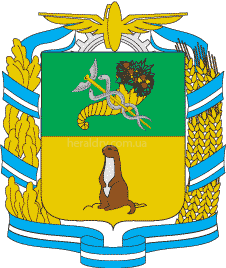
- Flag Coat of arms
- Interactive map of Kupiansk Raion
- Coordinates: 49°40′35.85″N 37°41′10.5612″E
- Country: Ukraine
- Oblast: Kharkiv
- Admin. center: Kupiansk
- Subdivisions: 8 hromadas

Area
  - Total: 4,612.9 km^{2} (1,781.1 sq mi)

Population (2022)
  - Total: 130,111
  - Density: 28.206/km^{2} (73.053/sq mi)
- Time zone: UTC+2 (EET)
  - Summer (DST): UTC+3 (EEST)
- Website: http://kupyansk-rayon.osp-ua.info/

Kupiansk Raion (Ukrainian: Куп'янський район) is a raion (district) in Kharkiv Oblast, Ukraine. The administrative center of the raion is the city of Kupiansk. Population: 130,111 (2022 estimate).

On 18 July 2020, as part of the administrative reform of Ukraine, the number of raions of Kharkiv Oblast was reduced to seven, and the area of Kupiansk Raion was significantly expanded. Three abolished raions, Dvorichna, Shevchenkove, and Velykyi Burluk Raions, as well as the city of Kupiansk, which was previously incorporated as a city of oblast significance and did not belong to the raion, were merged into Kupiansk Raion. The January 2020 estimate of the raion population was 23,180 (2020 est.).

It is approximately 120 kilometers to the east of Kharkiv and 40 kilometers south of the border with Russia.

== Subdivisions ==
=== Current ===
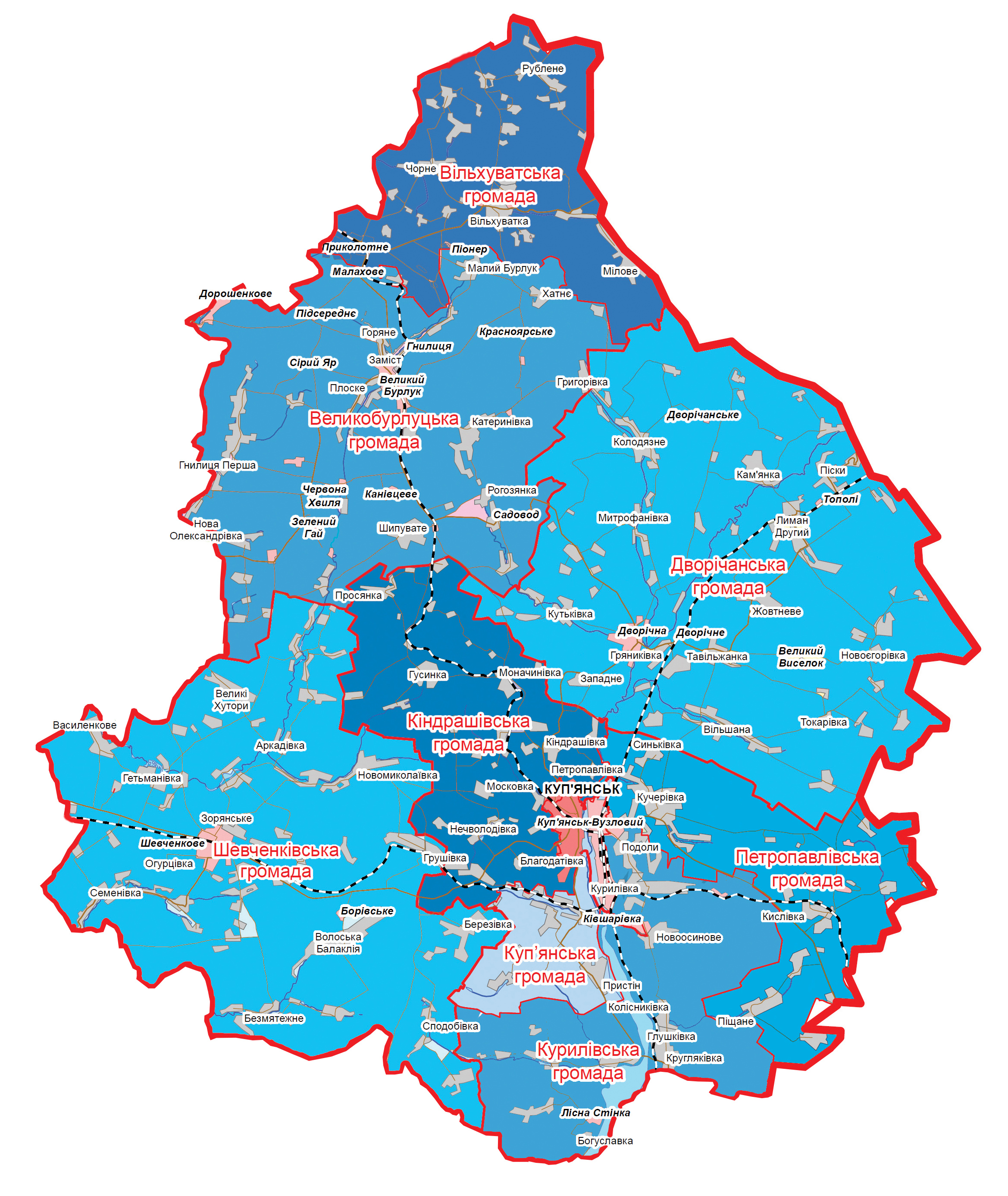
Map of Kupiansk Raion Hromadas after July 2020.

After the reform since 17 July 2020, the Raion consists of 8 territorial hromadas, including 1 city, 3 rural settlements, and 4 villages as administrative centers:

- Dvorichna settlement hromada, with the administration in rural settlement of Dvorichna, transferred from Dvorichna Raion;
- Kindrashivka rural hromada, village of Kindrashivka, retained from Kupiansk Raion;
- Kupiansk urban hromada, city of Kupiansk, transferred from Kupiansk Municipality;
- Kurylivka rural hromada, village of Kurylivka, retained from Kupiansk Raion;
- Petropavlivka rural hromada, village of Petropavlivka, retained from Kupiansk Raion.
- Shevchenkove settlement hromada, rural settlement of Shevchenkove, transferred from Shevchenkove Raion;
- Velykyi Burluk settlement hromada, rural settlement of Velykyi Burluk, transferred from Velykyi Burluk Raion;
- Vilkhuvatka rural hromada, village of Vilkhuvatka, transferred from Velykyi Burluk Raion;

=== Before 2020 ===
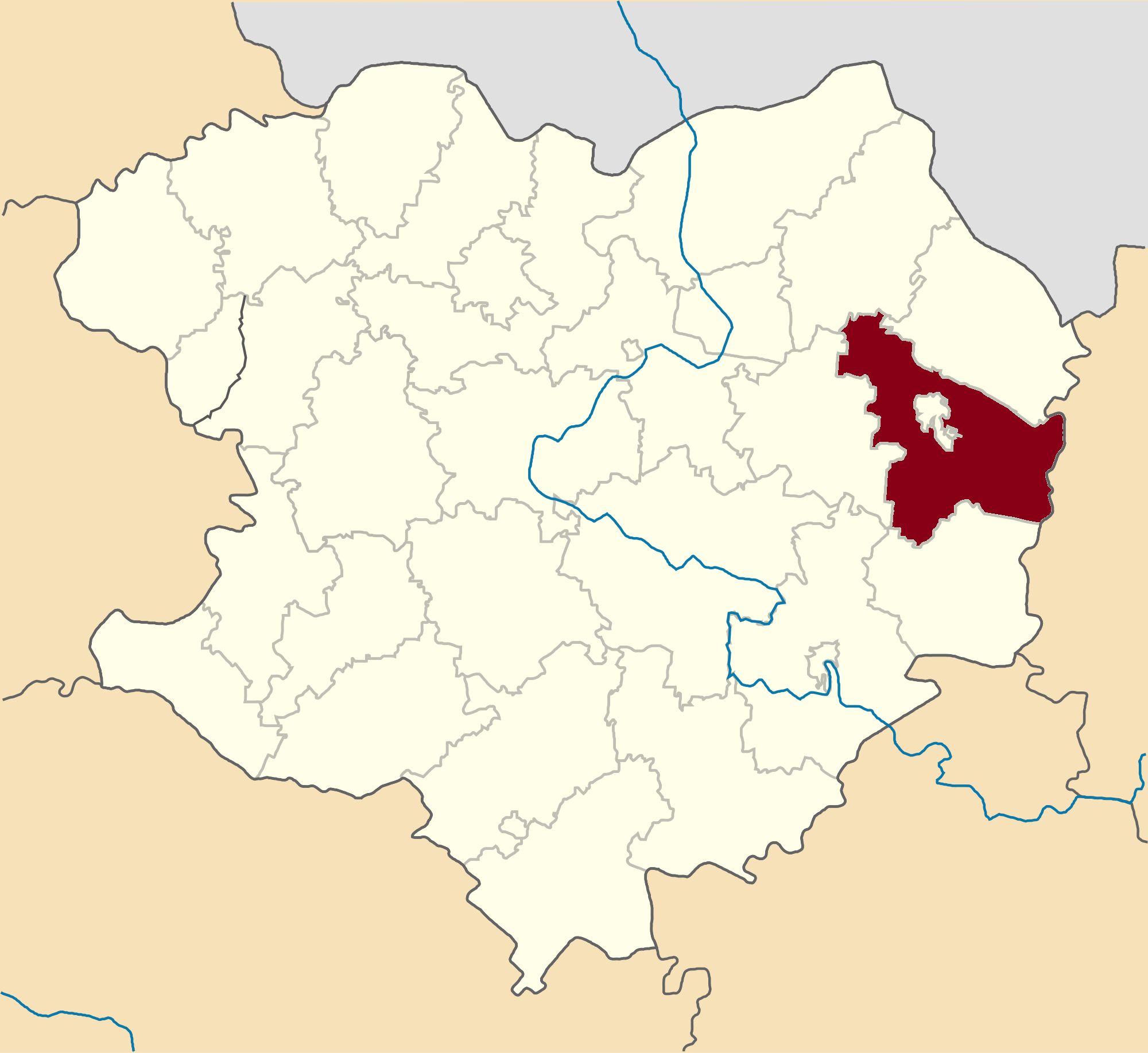
Kupiansk Raion in Kharkiv Oblast before 2020

Before the 2020 reform, the raion consisted of three hromadas:

- Kindrashivka rural hromada with the administration in Kindrashivka;
- Kurylivka rural hromada with the administration in Kurylivka;
- Petropavlivka rural hromada with the administration in Petropavlivka.

== Notable people ==
- Ilya Ilyich Mechnikov, microbiologist
- Vladimir Dudintsev, Ukrainian-born Russian writer
