= Kupiansk civilian convoy shelling =

Killing of civilians in Kupiansk

- Part of the 2022 Kharkiv counteroffensive in the Russian invasion of Ukraine
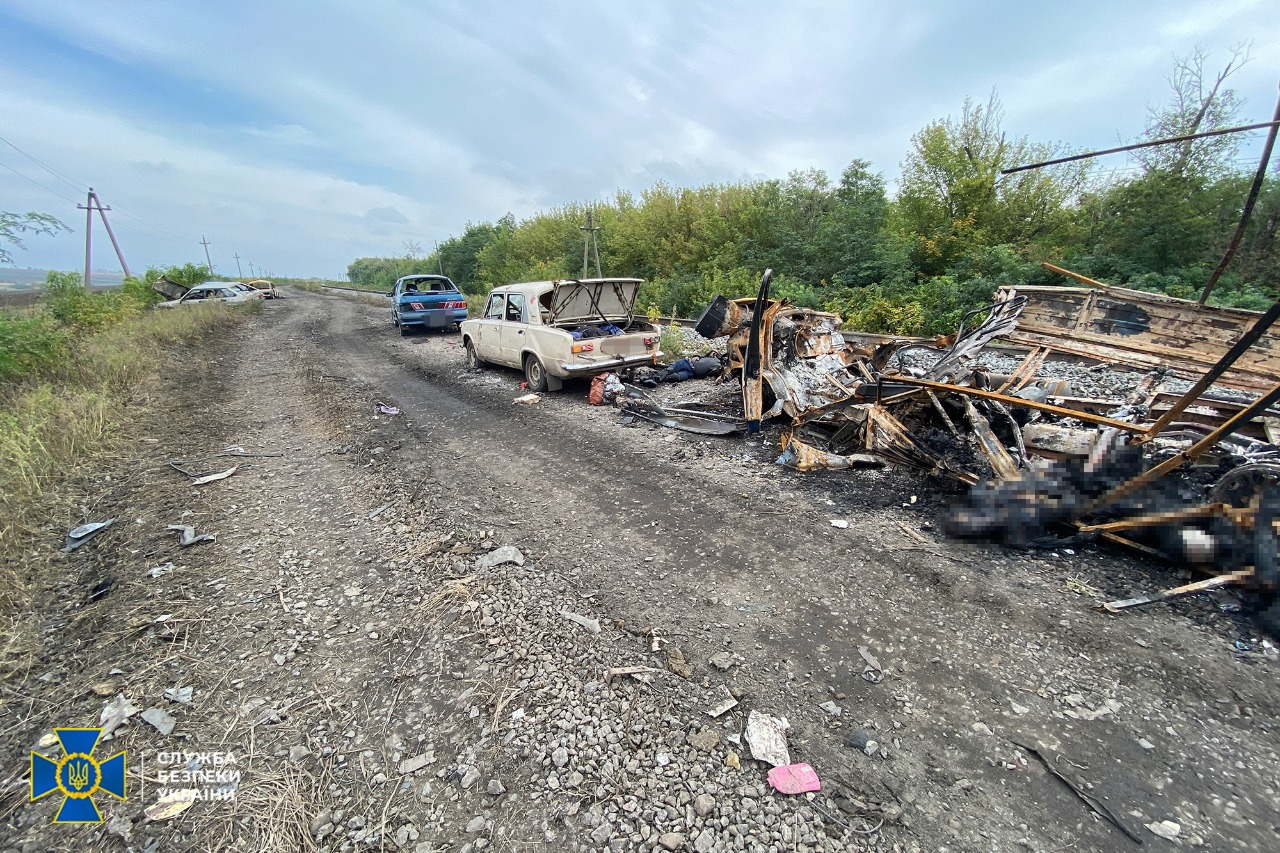
- Location: 49°39′24.4″N 37°44′51.2″E; 1 km from the railway track between Kurylivka and Pishchane, Ukraine.
- Date: September 25, 2022; ~09:00 (UTC+3)
- Target: Ukrainians
- Attack type: Mass shooting
- Deaths: 26
- Injuries: At least 3
- Perpetrator: Russian Armed Forces

The Kupiansk civilian convoy shelling was the killing of Ukrainian civilians carried out by the Russian Army on September 25, 2022, on the Kurylivka-Pishchane highway near Kupiansk, Kharkiv Oblast, Ukraine. 26 civilians were killed.

At that time, the section of the road was in the "gray zone" (area neither fully controlled by either side). The Ukrainian military was not able to reach the scene until October 1, 2022.

== History ==
During September 2022, the Armed Forces of Ukraine staged a counteroffensive in Kharkiv Oblast. Kupiansk-Vuzlovyi was regained on September 27.

On September 30, Ukrainian soldiers found the remnants of a convoy in the outskirts of Kurylivka. Bodies of civilians were discovered in six cars and a van heading towards Pishchane.

Following news reports, seven witnesses came forward who had escaped to the village of Kivsharivka. According to them, on the morning of September 25, their evacuation convoy left Kurylivka in the direction of Svatove, Starobilsk, through what they believed was the only road open. At around 9 o'clock, their column was ambushed by a group of Russian soldiers which shot at the convoy from both sides. Small arms were used to kill the wounded and those who tried to escape.

Police officers subsequently identified the bodies as local residents. Among the dead was the organizer of the refugee convoy who had charged ₴6,000 per evacuee and was a former resident of Kupiansk-Vuzlovyi. Twelve of the dead had been named by October 20, 2022.

A further body was discovered on October 17, 2022, 1.5 kilometres away from the incident site. The final death toll was 26 people. 22 people managed to escape.

The bodies and a car were examined by French experts who discovered signs of the use of 30 mm and 45 mm high-explosive shells, as well as VOG-17 and VOG-25 grenades.
