= Kurylivka, Kupiansk Raion =

Village in Kharkiv Oblast, Ukraine

Kurylivka Курилівка
- Village
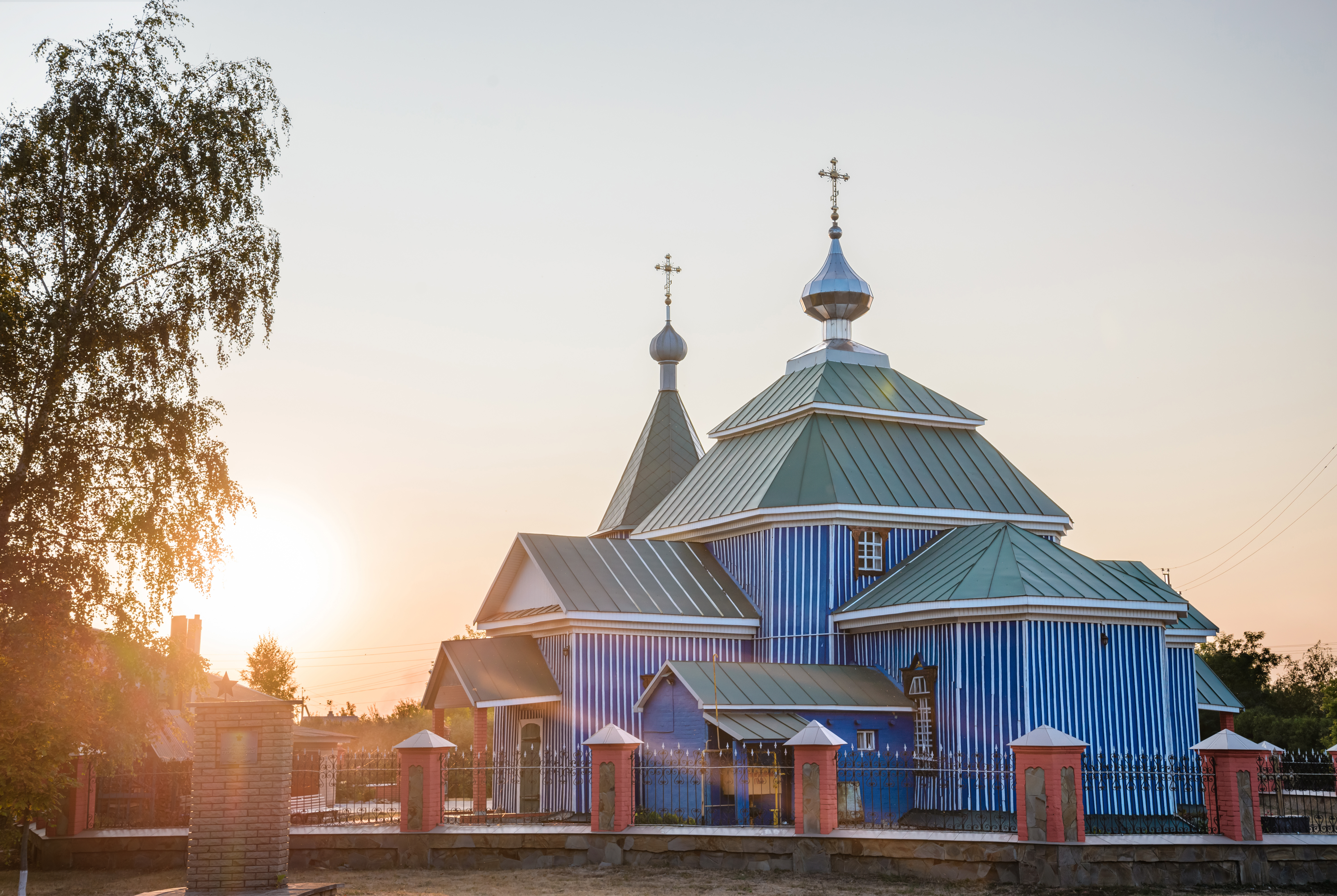
- St. John of Patmos Church.

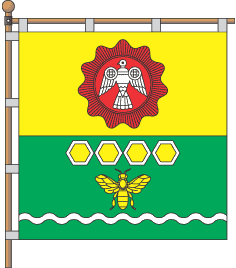
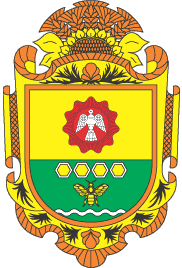
- Flag Coat of arms
- Interactive map of Kurylivka
- Location in Ukraine Kurylivka (Ukraine)
- Coordinates: 49°39′38″N 37°41′54″E
- Country: Ukraine
- Oblast: Kharkiv Oblast
- Raion: Kupiansk Raion
- Hromada: Kurylivka rural hromada
- Founded: 1775

Area
  - Total: 4.47 km^{2} (1.73 sq mi)
- Elevation: 95 m (312 ft)

Population (2001 census)
  - Total: 3,351
  - Estimate (2025): 240
  - Density: 750/km^{2} (1,940/sq mi)
- Time zone: UTC+2 (EET)
  - Summer (DST): UTC+3 (EEST)
- Postal code: 63728-63730
- Area code: +380 5742

Kurylivka (Ukrainian: Курилівка; Russian: Куриловка) is a village in Kupiansk Raion (district) in Kharkiv Oblast of eastern Ukraine, at about 113.6 kilometres (70.6 mi) east-southeast from the center of Kharkiv city. It hosts the administration of Kurylivka rural hromada, one of the hromadas of Ukraine.

On 25 September 2022 an attack on the vehicles, which carried 31 people attempting to flee fighting in Russian-held territory in northeastern Ukraine, was carried out, resulting in seven survivors. By 16 February 2026, Russian forces claimed control over the village. On 12 April 2026, Russian control was confirmed by the ISW.

== Geography ==
The village of Kurylivka is located 12 km south from Kupyansk on the Lozovatka River. The village of Peschane is 2 km upstream, and downstream it adjoins the urban-type settlement of Kupiansk-Vuzlovyi. The village is crossed by a railway, with stations at Kurylivka station. The P-07 road passes nearby.

== History ==
- In 1775, during the reign of Catherine the Great, the village was founded.
- During the war, 908 village residents fought on the front lines in the Red Army; 352 soldiers died; 226 were awarded military USSR orders and medals. The deceased Soviet pilot Ivan Ivanovich Chuchvaga, who accomplished a feat and was awarded the title Hero of the Soviet Union is buried in the village.
- In 1976, the village had 1,420 households and a population of 4,794.

== Population ==
=== Language ===
Distribution of the population by native language according to the 2001 census:

Language	Percentage
Ukrainian	78.3%
Russian	21.2%
other/undecided	0.5%

== Social sphere ==
Village club and library.

- Dairy and poultry farms;
- Kurilovskoye village store;
- Kupyansk Foundry, OJSC
- Nadiya LLC;
- Kupyansk airfield.

== Religion ==
The Church of St. John the Theologian, probably built in 1625 or late XVIII century, rebuilt in 1836. The wooden church was probably one of the oldest churches in the Kharkiv region. In the 1930s, the church was converted into a grain storage facility, and later a movie theater and a military canteen; the bell tower and dome were destroyed. In the 1990s and 2000s, the church was restored. Destroyed during the retreat of the Russian army in September 2022.

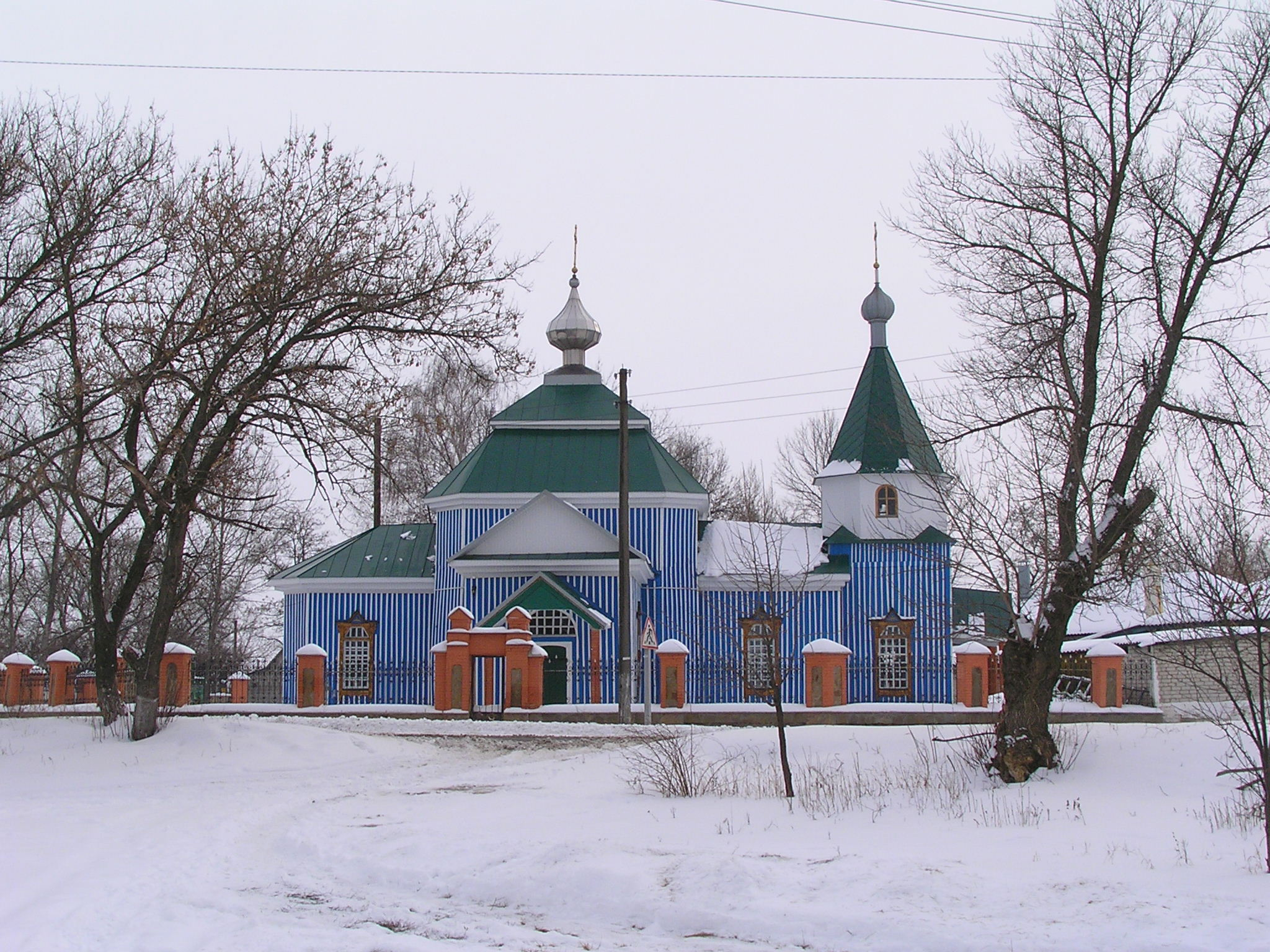

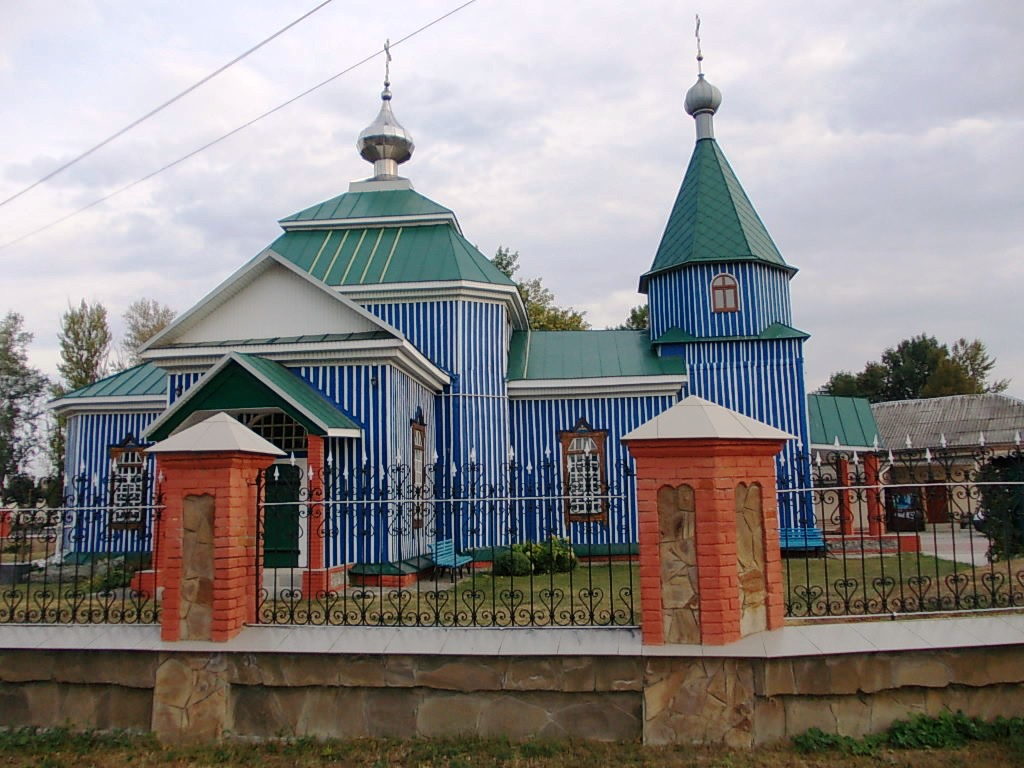

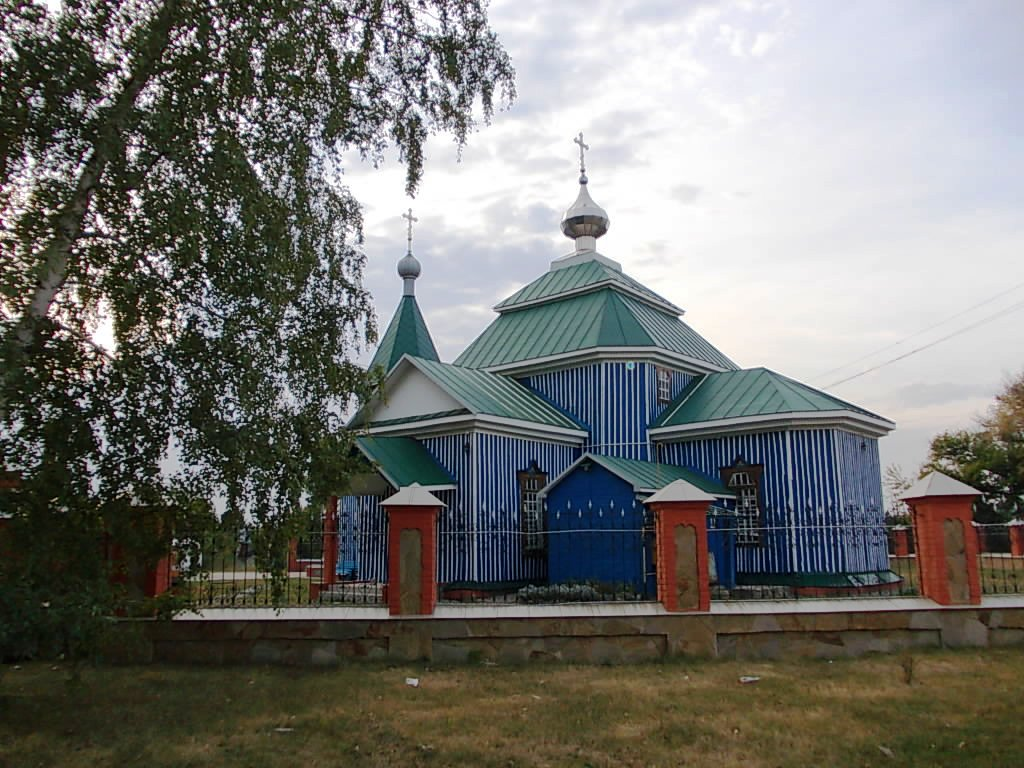
