= Kupiansk-Vuzlovyi =

Rural locality in Kharkiv Oblast, Ukraine

Kupiansk-Vuzlovyi Куп'янськ-Вузловий
- Rural settlement
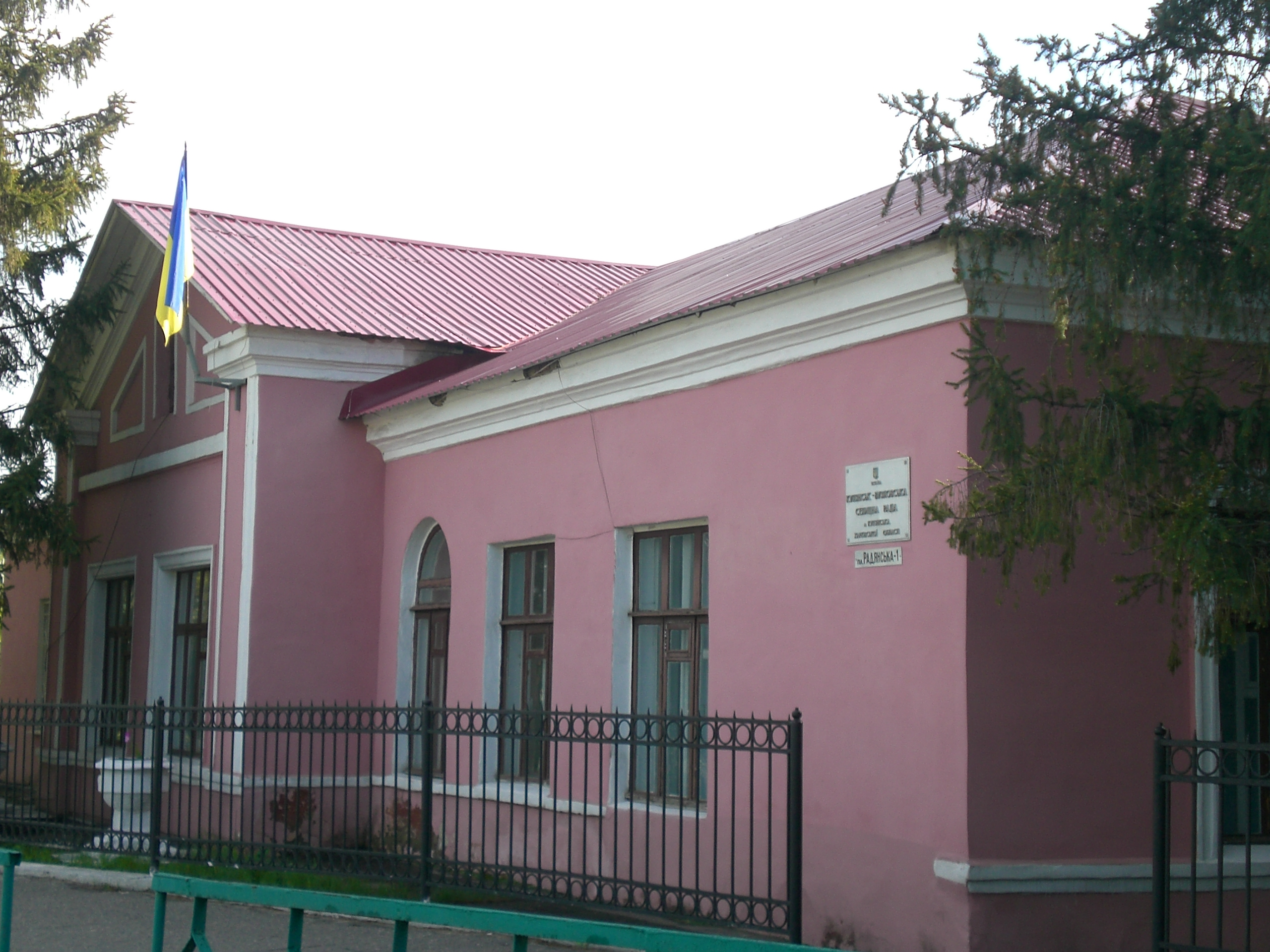
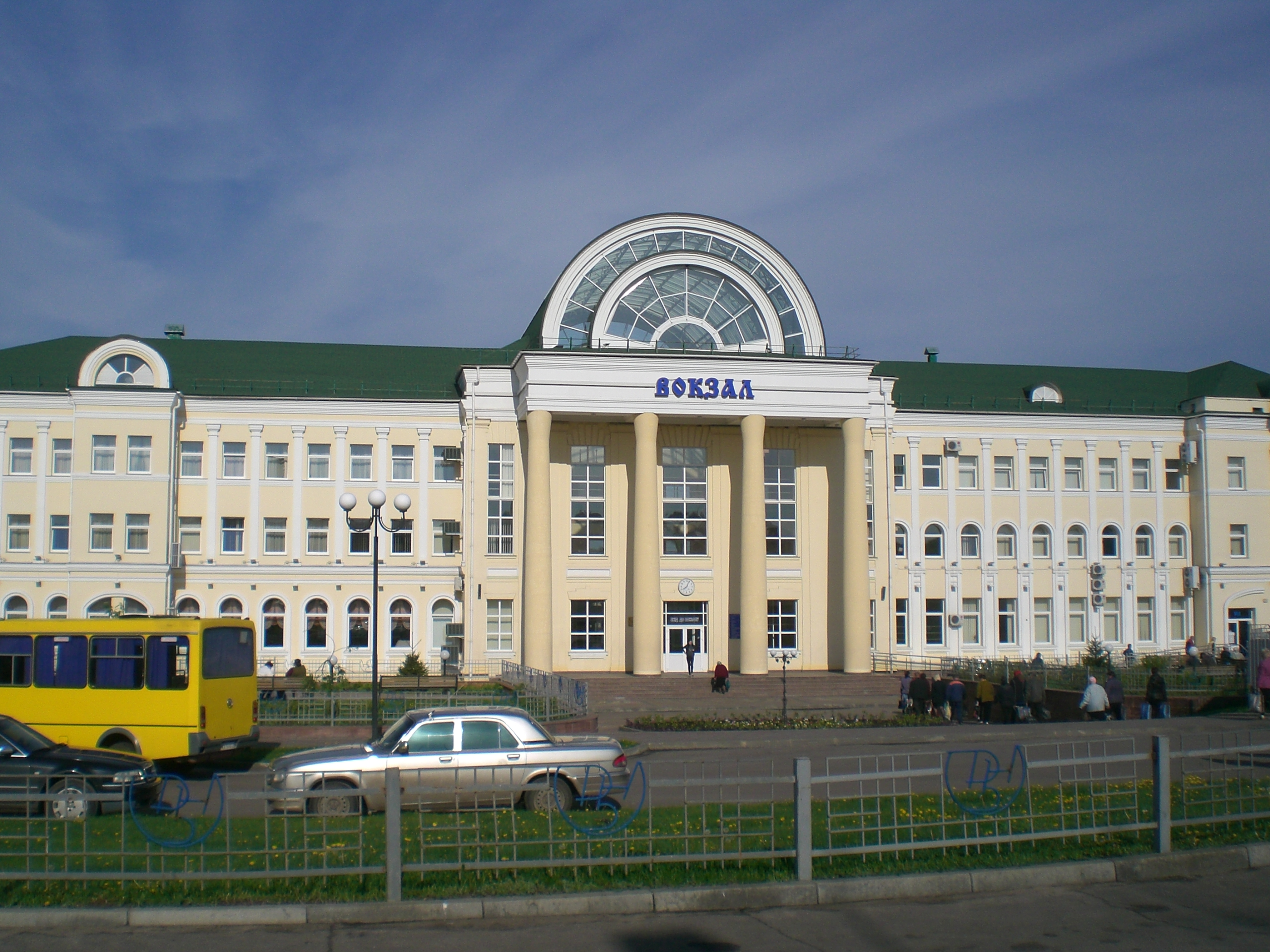
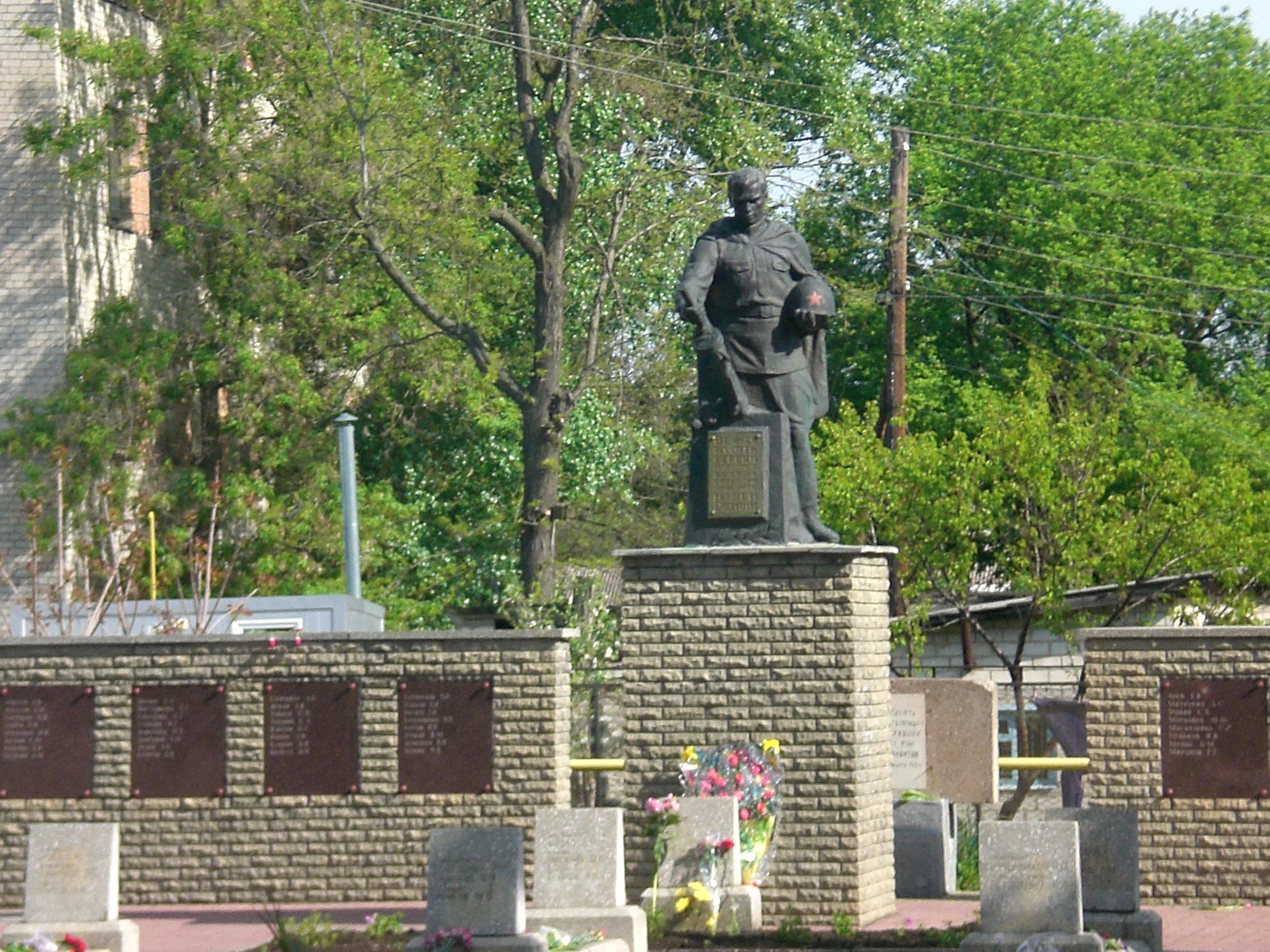
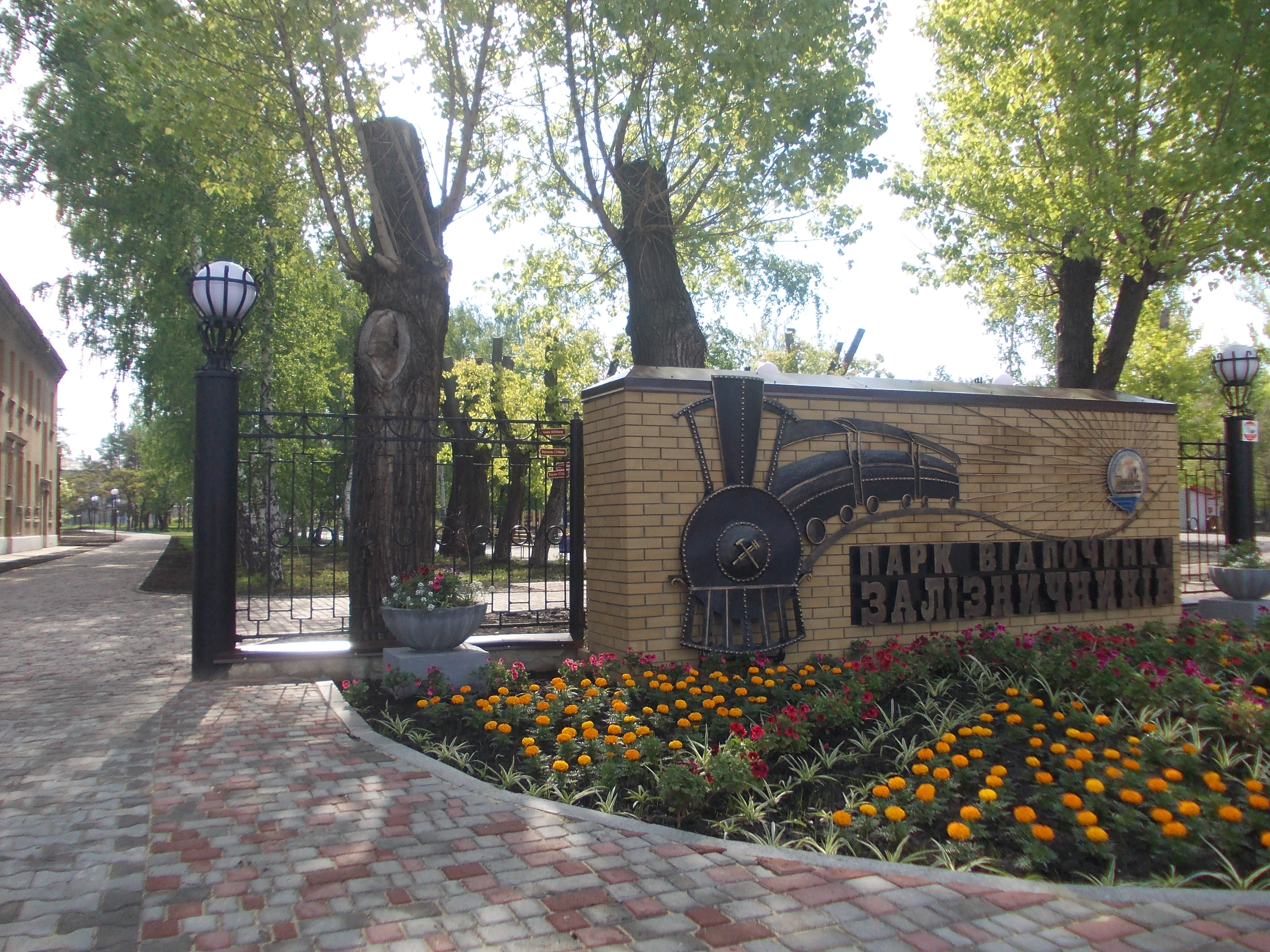
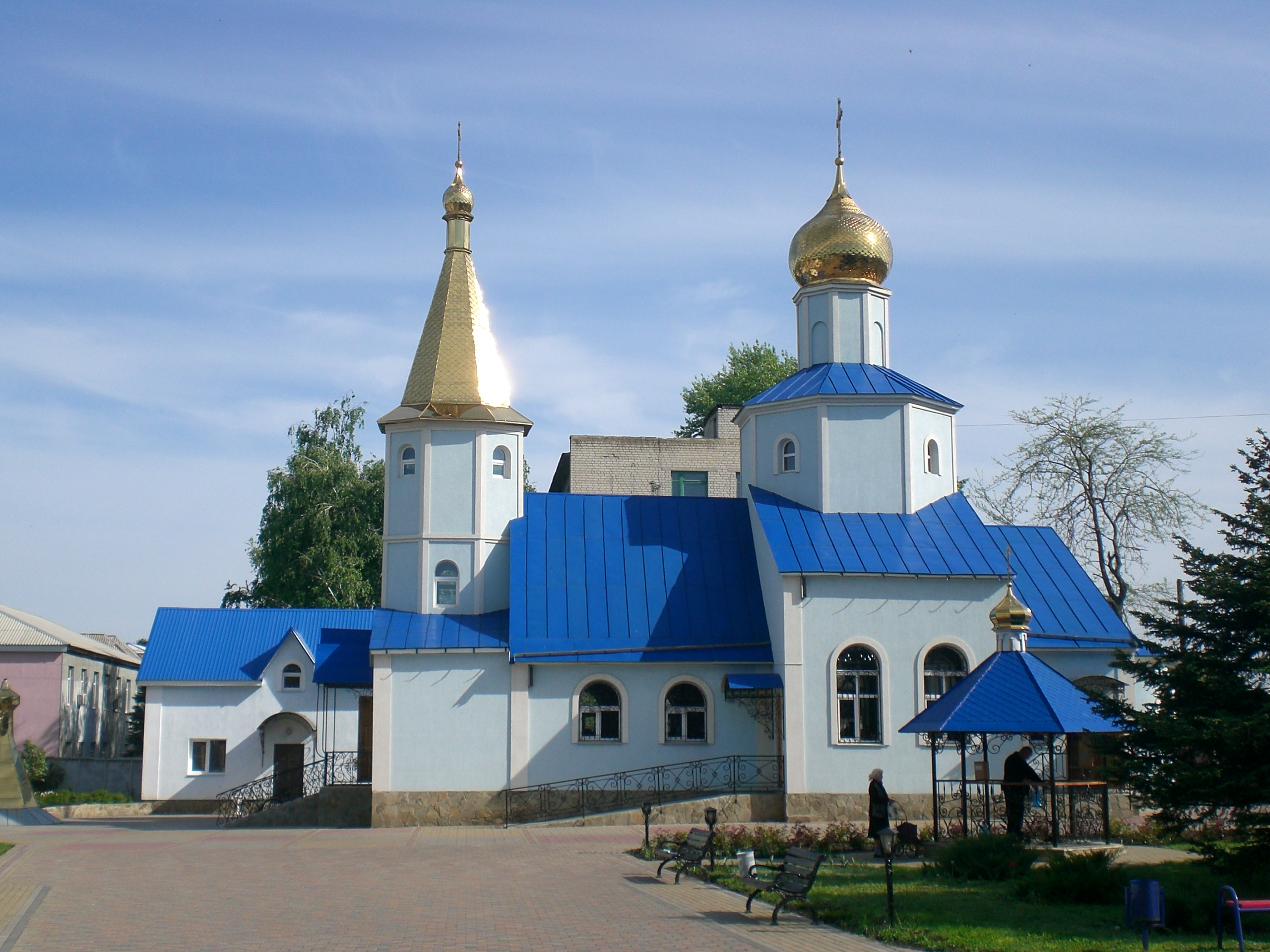
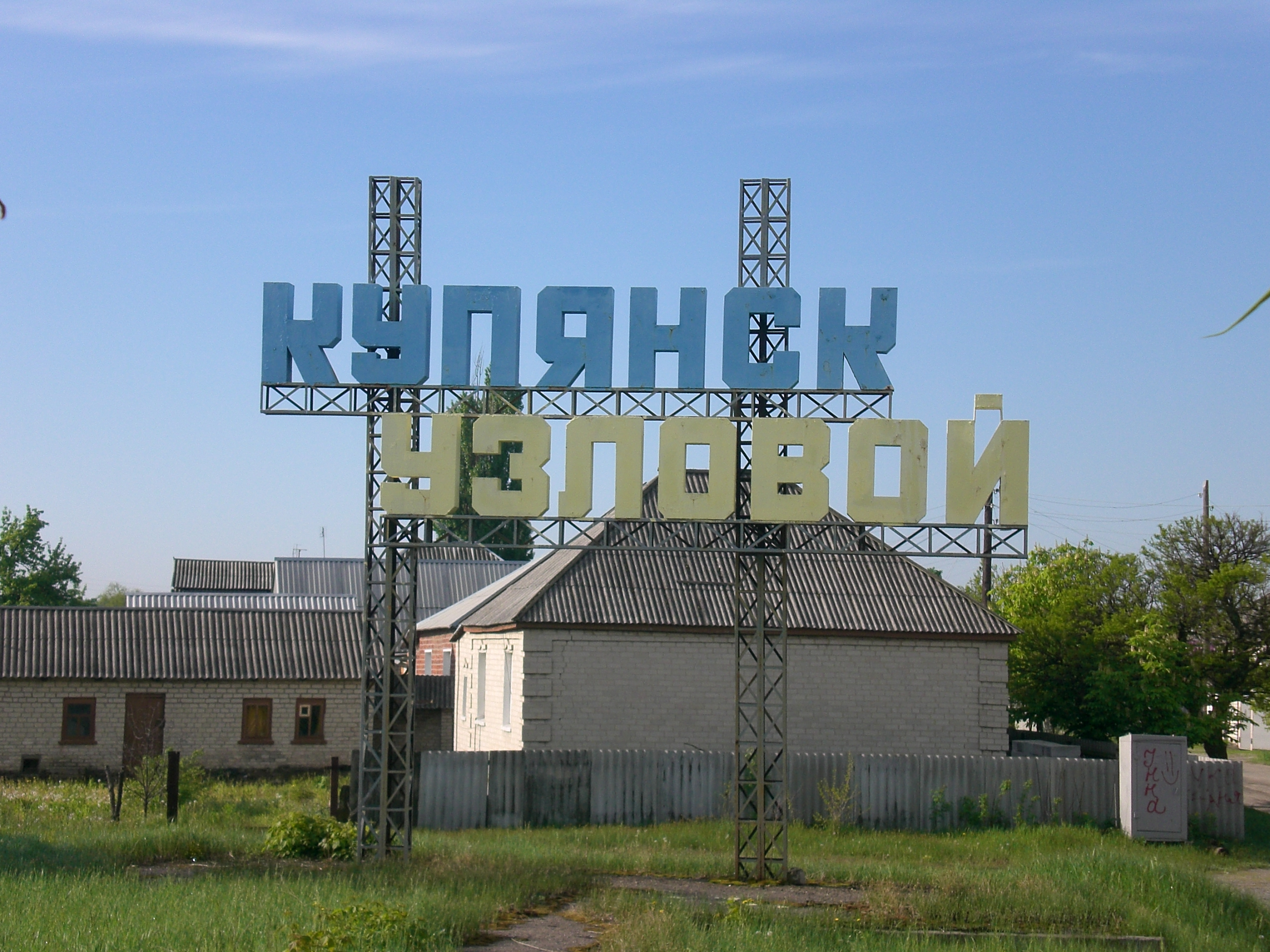
- From top, left to right: Settlement council; Train station; World War II memorial; Railway workers park; Holy Protection Church; Village sign
- Interactive map of Kupiansk-Vuzlovyi
- Location in Kharkiv Oblast Location in Ukraine
- Coordinates: 49°39′24″N 37°39′00″E
- Country: Ukraine
- Oblast: Kharkiv Oblast
- Raion: Kupiansk Raion
- Hromada: Kupiansk urban hromada

Area
  - Total: 4.42 km^{2} (1.71 sq mi)

Population (2022)
  - Total: 8,212
  - Density: 1,860/km^{2} (4,810/sq mi)
- Time zone: UTC+2 (EET)
  - Summer (DST): UTC+3 (EEST)
- Post Code: 63709
- Area code: +380 5742
- KATOTTH: UA63080090030044417

Kupiansk-Vuzlovyi (Ukrainian: Куп'янськ-Вузловий, Russian: Купянск-Узловой) is a rural settlement in Kupiansk Raion of Kharkiv Oblast in Ukraine. It is located on the left bank of the Oskil, in the drainage basin of the Don. Kupiansk-Vuzlovyi belongs to Kupiansk urban hromada, one of the hromadas of Ukraine. The village has 8,212 (2022 estimate) inhabitants.

== Geography ==
Kupiansk-Vuzlovyi is located on the left bank of the Oskol at the confluence of the Lozovatka River, upstream near the locomotive depot it borders on the city of Kupyansk; 1.5 km from the center of the village is the factory settlement of Trubny, downstream at a distance of 2.5 km is the urban-type settlement of Kivsharivka, on the opposite bank is the village of Osinovo. Upstream of the Lozovatka River is the village of Kurylivka.

== History ==
In 1895, the settlement was created in Kharkov Governorate of the Russian Empire to serve the eponymous railway station of the Balashov — Kharkiv railway line. Its history is closely linked to that of Kupyansk. In 1896, the Belgorod — Volchansk railway line was opened. In 1901, construction of the Kupyansk — Volchansk railway line was completed, thus forming the Belgorod — Kupyansk line (divided by the state border since 1991). Seven miles from the city, construction began on a railway junction. On the site of the Lotnikovka farmstead (formerly Lotnikovskoye), the railway workers' settlement of Kupyansk-Uzlovaya was built.

During the World War II, from July 1942 to 3 February 1943, the town of was under German occupation. In 1956, a club with a 600-seat hall was built here (architect N.V. Varakin). In the early 1970s, a building materials plant and railway maintenance companies operated here. In January 1989, the population was 13,196.

According to the 2001 census, there were 9,789 people, 4,478 men and 5,311 women, and as of January 1, 2013, there were 8,989 people. In 2009, a new railway station opened. On January 14, 2010, Archbishop Onufriy (Lyogky), Vicar of the Kharkiv Diocese of Izium, consecrated the newly built Holy Protection Church.

Until 18 July 2020, Kupiansk-Vuzlovyi belonged to Kupiansk Municipality. The municipality was abolished in July 2020 as part of the administrative reform of Ukraine, which reduced the number of raions of Kharkiv Oblast to seven. The area of Kupiansk Municipality was merged into Kupiansk Raion.

In 2022, Russia invaded Ukraine and occupied Kupiansk-Vuzlovyi. On September 10, amidst Ukraine's offensive in Kharkiv Oblast, Russian forces retreated from Kupiansk after which it was retaken by Ukraine. On September 26, Kupiansk-Vuzlovyi was also retaken.

Until 26 January 2024, Kupiansk-Vuzlovyi was designated urban-type settlement. On this day, a new law entered into force which abolished this status, and Kupiansk-Vuzlovyi became a rural settlement.

In January 2026, Valery Gerasimov, Chief of the Russian General Staff, said that Russia had captured Kupiansk-Vuzlovyi and that troops were "conducting inspections and clearing urban neighborhoods". However, at this time Russian controlled territory was still 10 km from Kupiansk-Vuzlovyi, and the city was under full control of Ukraine.

== Economy ==
=== Transportation ===
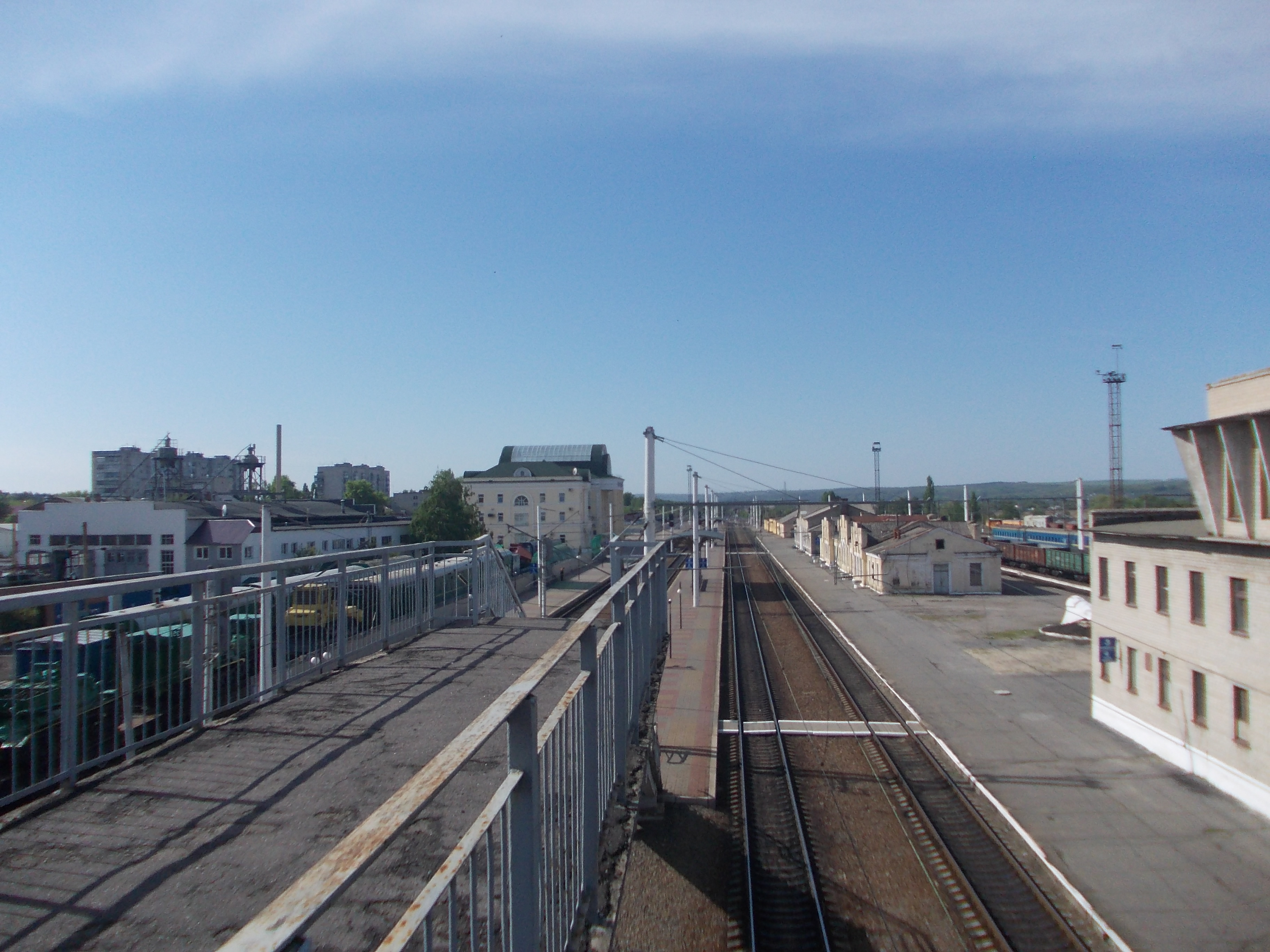
Train Station.

Kupiansk-Vuzlovyi railway station is a major railway junction which has connections with Kharkiv, Sviatohirsk, Sievierodonetsk, and, via Kupiansk to Stary Oskol in Russia. There are passenger trains along these directions.

The settlement has access to Highway H26 connecting Kharkiv with Sievierodonetsk, as well as by local roads to Borova and further to Izium.

=== Industry ===
- Kupyansk Track Machine Station No. 133;
- Kupyansk-Uzlovaya Track Depot No. 15;
- Kupyansk Construction, Installation, and Operations Department No. 4;
- Kupyansk Signaling and Communications Depot No. 12;
- Kupyansk Operating Car Depot No. 4;
- Kupyansk Car Repair Depot No. 12;
- Kupyansk Locomotive Depot No. 15;
- Kupyansk-Sortirovochny Station;
- Kupyansk Silicate Plant.

== Social sphere ==
- Kindergarten No. 1 "Solnyshko";
- Educational Complex No. 3;
- House of Science and Technology;
- Kupyansk-Uzlovskaya Road Polyclinic, Therapy Department;
- Lokomotiv Sports Complex (swimming pool, stadium, mini-football field).

== Attractions ==
- Memorial to the Red Army soldiers of the Great Patriotic War;
- Monument to the Unknown Soldier;
- Monument to railway workers;
- Steam locomotive monument (on the grounds of the locomotive depot).
