= Kupiansk =

City in Kharkiv Oblast, Ukraine

Kupiansk Куп'янськ Kupyansk
- City
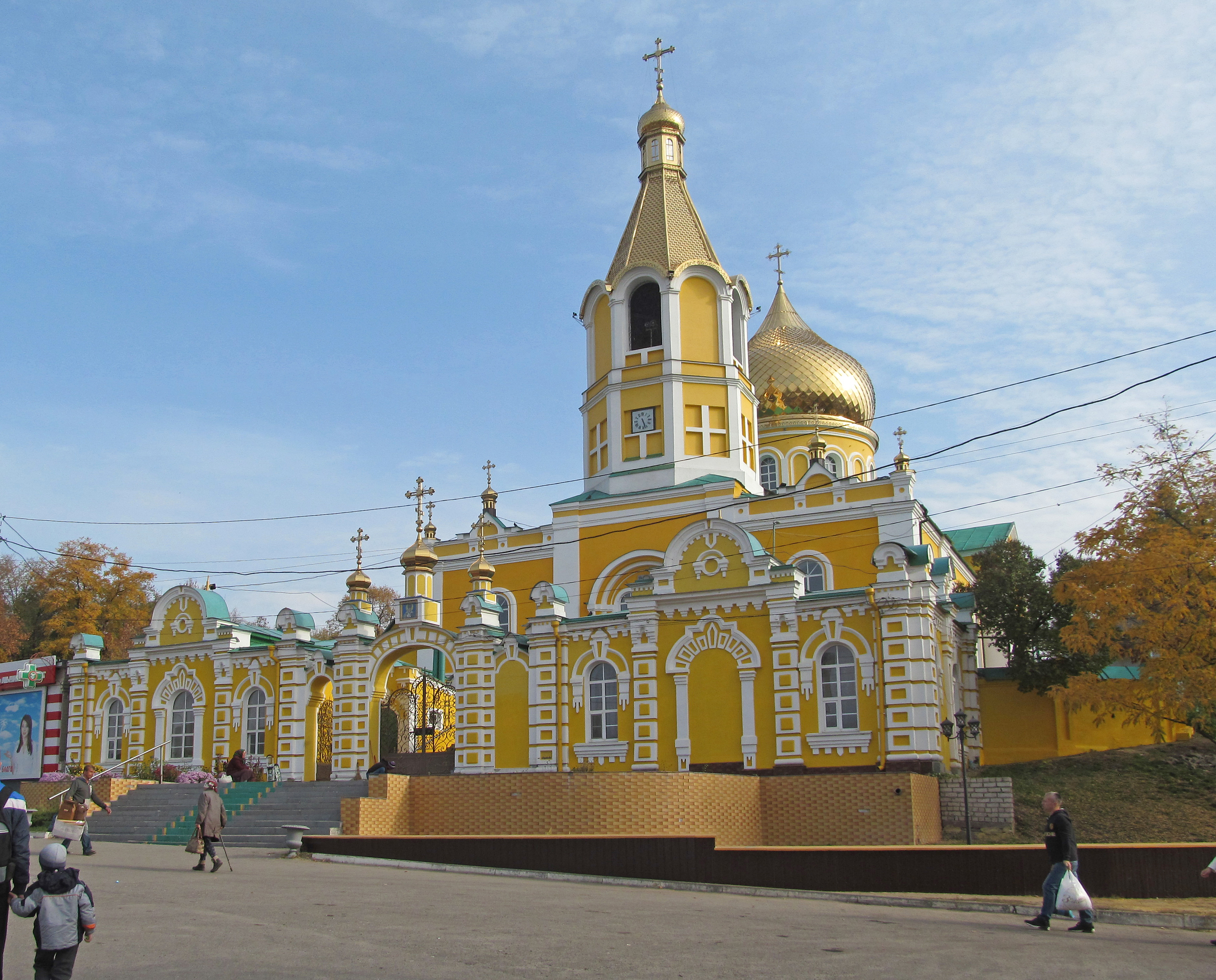
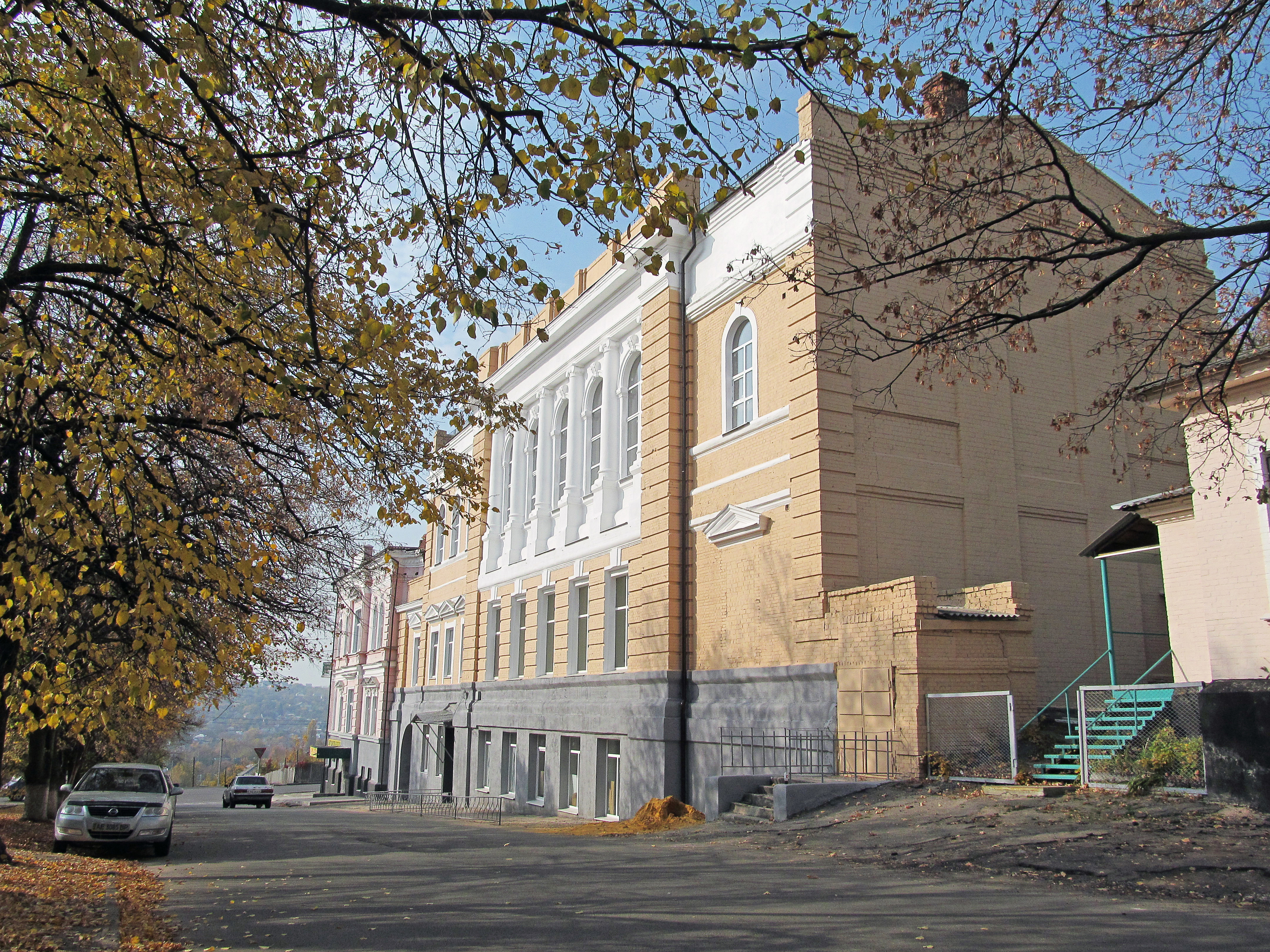
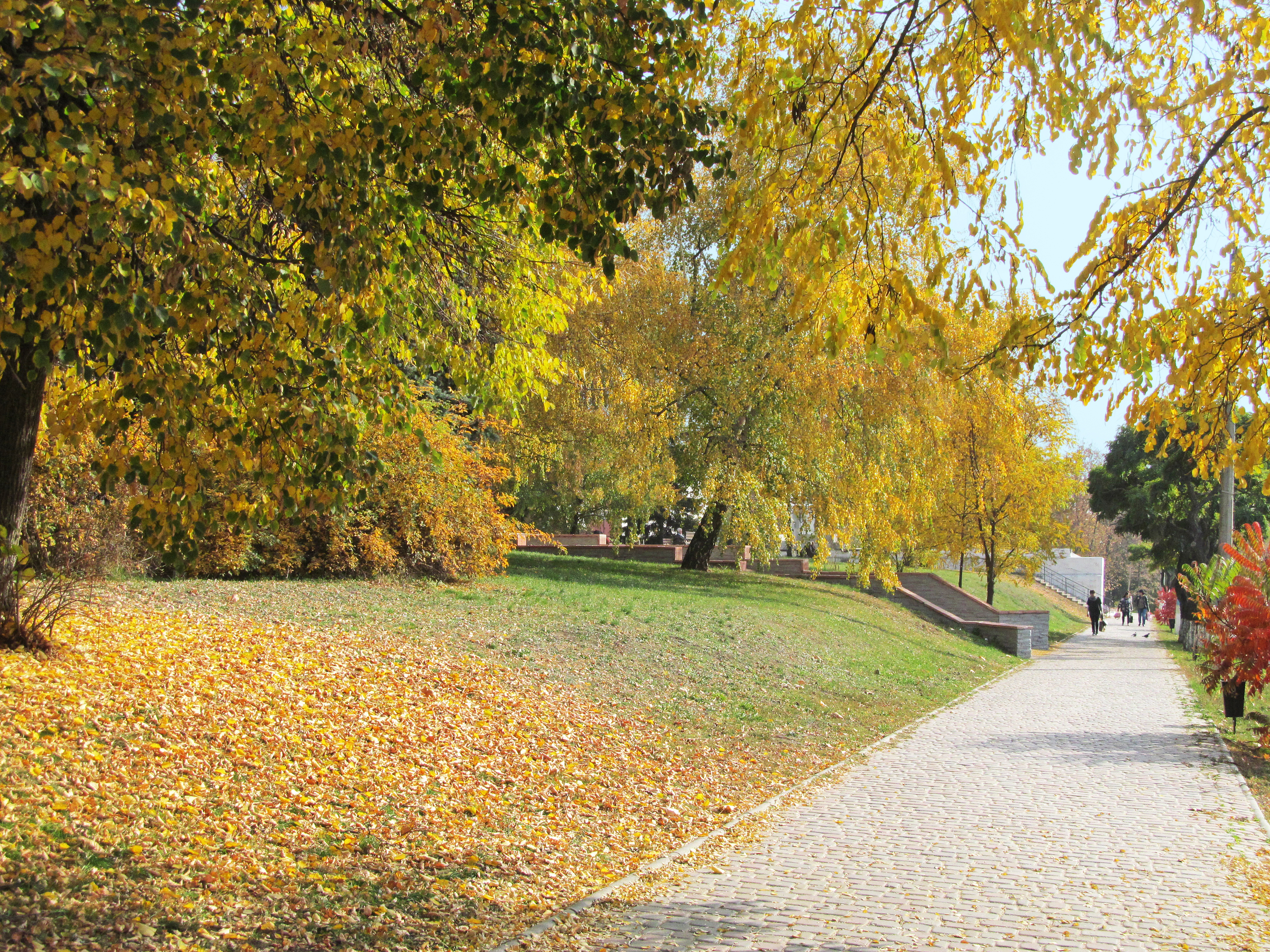
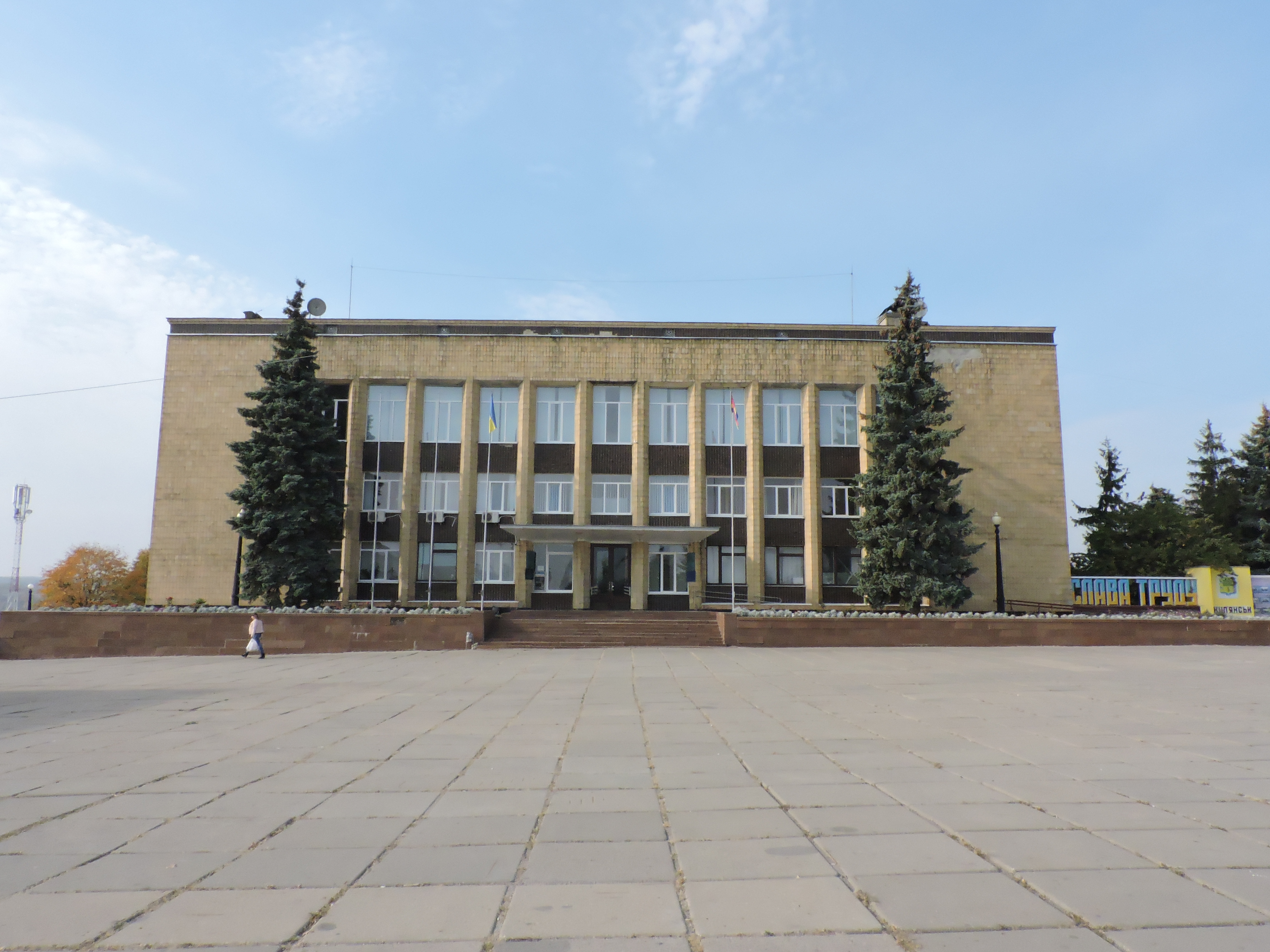
- Saint Nicholas church City House of Culture Park Administrative building

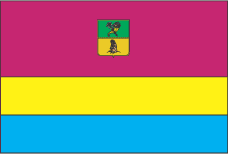
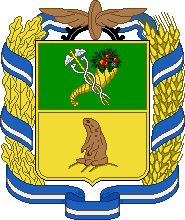
- Flag Coat of arms
- Interactive map of Kupiansk
- Location within Ukraine Location within Kharkiv Oblast
- Country: Ukraine
- Oblast: Kharkiv Oblast
- Raion: Kupiansk Raion
- Hromada: Kupiansk urban hromada
- Founded: 1655

Government
  - head of City Military Administration: Andrii Besedin

Area
  - Total: 33.34 km^{2} (12.87 sq mi)

Population (November 2025)
  - Total: 560
  - Density: 17/km^{2} (44/sq mi)
- Time zone: UTC+2 (EET)
  - Summer (DST): UTC+3 (EEST)
- Postal code: 63700-63709
- Website: kupyansk.osp-ua.info

Kupiansk or Kupyansk (Ukrainian: Куп'янськ, IPA: [ˈkupjɐnʲsʲk]; Russian: Купянск, IPA: [ˈkupʲɪnsk]) is a city in Kharkiv Oblast, Ukraine. It is the administrative center of Kupiansk Raion. It is also an important railroad junction for the oblast. Kupiansk hosts the administration of Kupiansk urban hromada, one of the hromadas of Ukraine. It had a population of 26,627 (2022 estimate). In February 2024, more than 3,500 people remained in the city, and by November 2025, its population had declined to 560. It is located in the historic region of Sloboda Ukraine.

As of November 2025, Russian forces claim control of the city while top Ukrainian military officials deny this.

Until 18 July 2020, Kupiansk was incorporated as a city of oblast significance and the center of Kupiansk Municipality. The municipality was abolished in July 2020, as part of administrative reforms in Ukraine, which reduced the number of raions in Kharkiv Oblast to seven. The area of Kupiansk Municipality was merged into Kupiansk Raion.

== Overview ==
Kupiansk is located on the bank of the Oskil River. Kupiansk is divided into three subparts, known as: Kupiansk (main part of town), Kupiansk-Vuzlovyi (where the train station is), and Kivsharivka.

Kupiansk is about two and a half hours from Kharkiv. The two cities are connected by train and bus.

== History ==
=== Ancient settlements ===
Human settlement in the area dates back over 6,000 years. A Neolithic settlement from circa 5000-4000 BC and four Bronze Age burial mounds from 2000 to 1000 BC were discovered near Kupiansk.

=== Early history ===
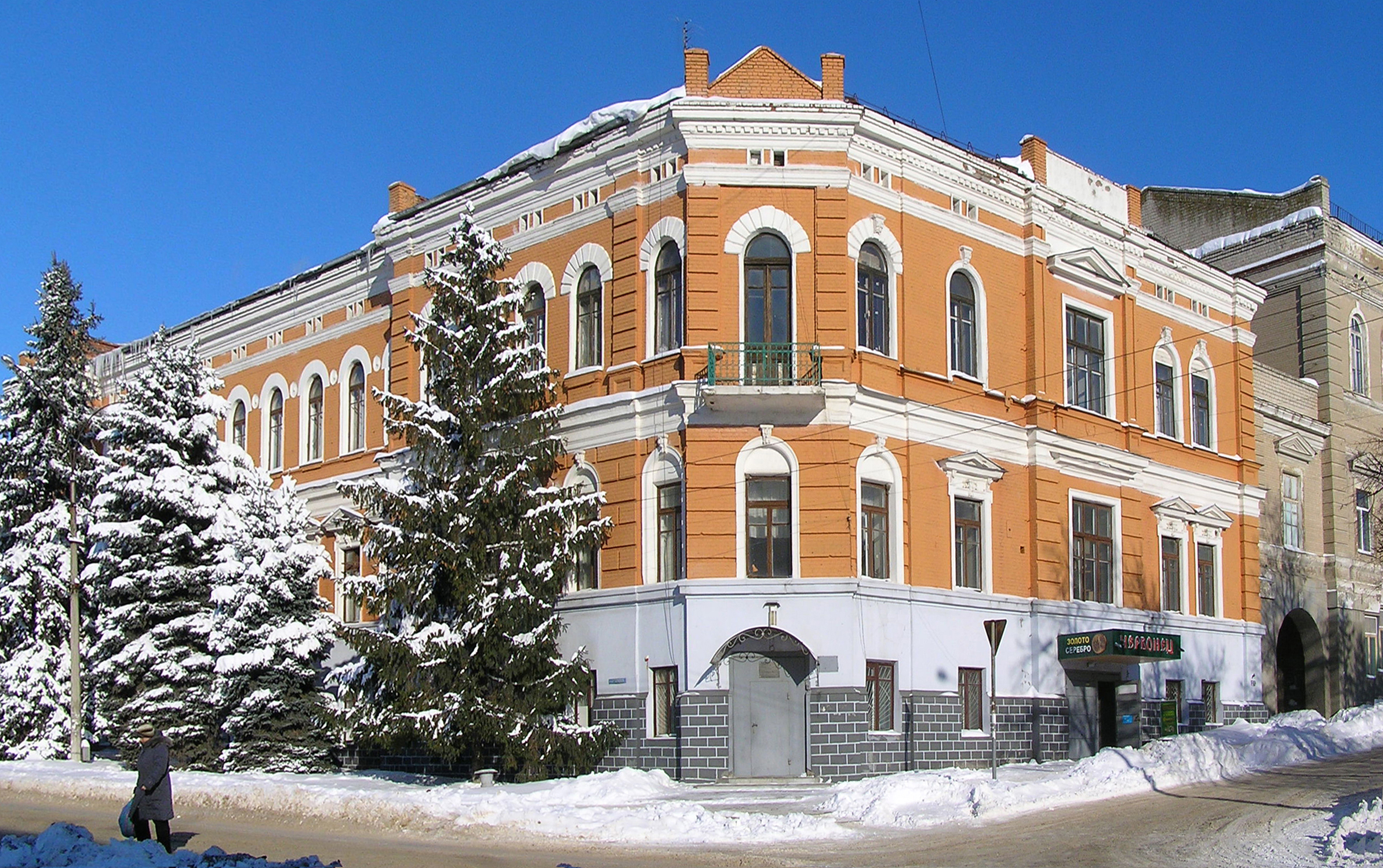
Former theological school

Kupiansk was founded under the name Kupenka in 1655 within the region of Sloboda Ukraine. It was a typical military Ukrainian Cossack settlement. Residents were engaged in military service, agriculture, crafts, and trade.

After the end of Crimean Tatar raids, since the 1730s, the town's economic development accelerated. In the 18th century, the town began to be called Kupiansk, and became a major trading center. Four annual fairs were organized as of 1767, and six as of 1780. There were also two weekly markets, on Mondays and Fridays. In particular, distilling and milling have developed considerably, but other products were also made in Kupiansk. In 1781, the town's coat of arms was approved. A theological school and a craft school were opened in 1819 and 1885, respectively. Since 1895, Kupiansk obtained railway connections with Kharkiv, Vovchansk and Lysychansk.

During the Ukrainian War of Independence, from 1917 to 1920, it passed between various factions. Afterwards it was administratively part of the Kharkiv Governorate of Ukraine.

Kupiansk was occupied during World War II by Germany from 24 July 1942 to 3 February 1943.

=== Russo-Ukrainian war ===
Kupiansk was first occupied by Russian forces from 27 February 2022 to 10 September 2022. Although the Ukrainian Army had destroyed a railway bridge to slow the Russian advance three days earlier, Kupiansk Mayor Hennadiy Matsehora, member of the Opposition Platform — For Life party, surrendered the city to the Russian Army in exchange for a cessation of hostilities, as the Russians threatened to take the city by force. As a result, the Ukrainian government indicted Matsehora for treason the next day. On 28 February 2022, Matsehora was arrested by Ukrainian authorities. Later Kupiansk became the de facto seat of the Russian-backed Kharkiv military-civilian administration and an important logistical supply route. At Kupiansk town hall, the Ukrainian flag continued to be flown for 6 weeks, and at the medical school for 3 months. Locals were forced to work for the occupation force, paint bridges in the colours of the Russian flag and perform railway repair for alleged salaries that were never paid out.

Kupiansk was liberated during the 2022 Kharkiv counteroffensive. On 8 September 2022, a representative of the General Staff of the Armed Forces of Ukraine announced that Ukrainian forces had retaken more than 20 settlements in the Kharkiv Oblast and "in some areas penetrated Russian defence positions up to 50km". On the same day, the Russian occupation authorities claimed that "the Russian army began to defend the city" and that "additional reinforcements entered the region from Russia", indicating that Ukrainian forces were re-approaching the city from the west, after retaking the town of Shevchenkove earlier that day. On 9 September 2022, Ukrainian forces re-entered the outskirts of Kupiansk and its administrative borders, starting the battle of Kupiansk. By the morning of 10 September 2022, Ukrainian forces had recaptured the city council building. Later that day, a Ukrainian official confirmed that the Ukrainian Armed Forces had liberated the city. By September 26, Ukrainian Forces liberated Kupiansk-Vuzlovyi, the sister city of Kupiansk, located on the left bank of the Oskil River.

After retreating from the city, Russian troops repeatedly shelled it. In particular, the central city hospital, high-rise buildings and a lyceum, the Kupiansk-Vuzlovyi railway station and others were damaged.

The first strikes against the town were on 13 September, which killed two civilians. The next day, one person was wounded from airstrikes. On 18 September, five people were injured from shelling in Kupiansk. Two days later, two civilians were killed and five injured after Russian shelling on the city. On 22 September, a woman and two children were injured by shelling.

On 26 September, Russian forces shelled a convoy of civilians escaping the villages of Kurylivka and Pishchane near Kupiansk, killing 26 civilians. Signs of torture were discovered in Russian administration centers throughout the city.

On 27 September, five civilians were injured after a Russian strike on a church in Kupiansk.

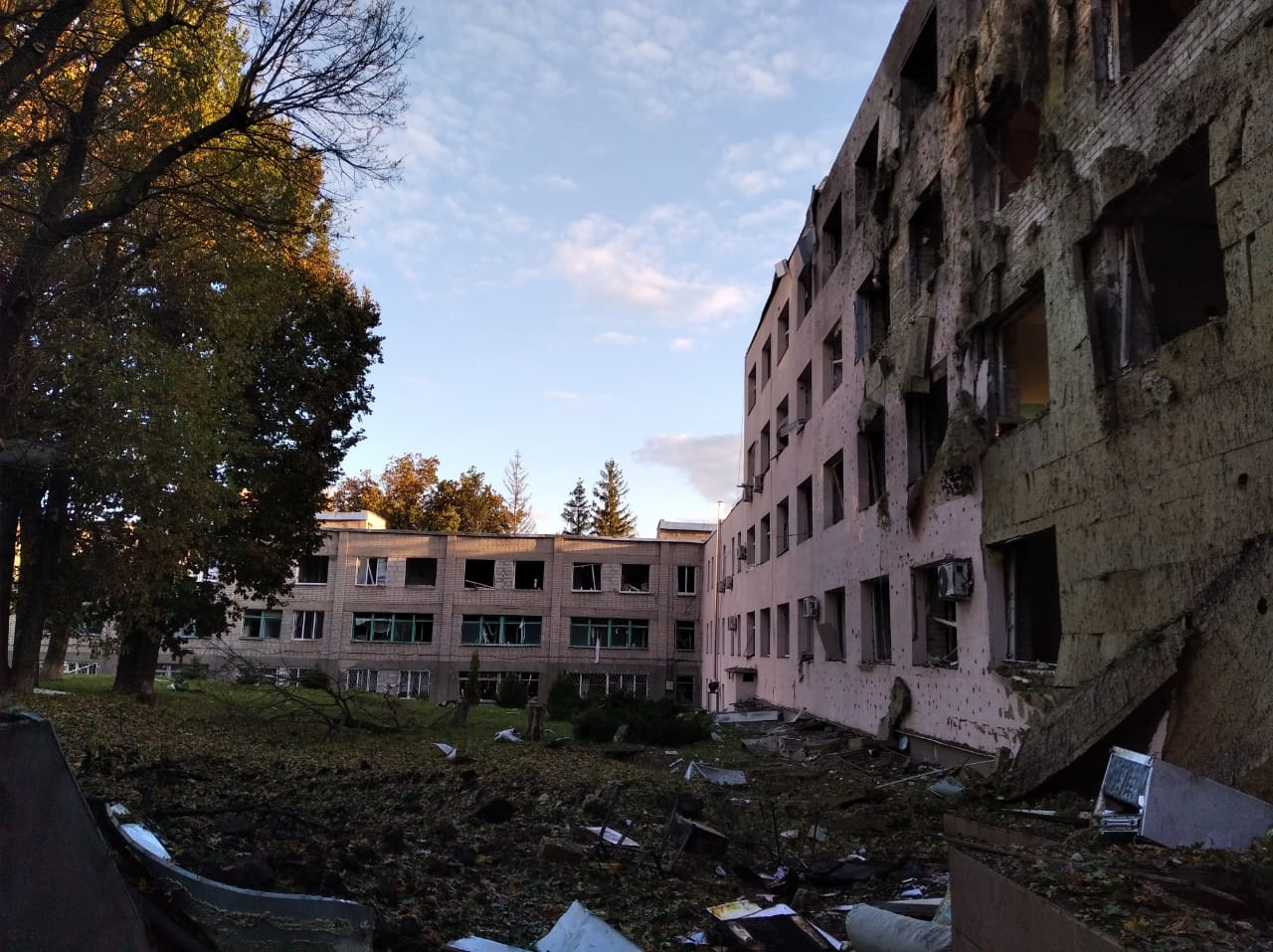
Central City Hospital after Russian shelling, 3 October 2022

On 3 October, Russian shelling of a hospital in Kupiansk killed a doctor and injured a nurse. One woman was injured on 5 October by an airstrike.

Kupiansk's bridge over the Oskil River was partially damaged in combat, and became suitable only for use by pedestrians. Russian forces bombed the local meat factory of Kupiansk, killing around a thousand pigs.

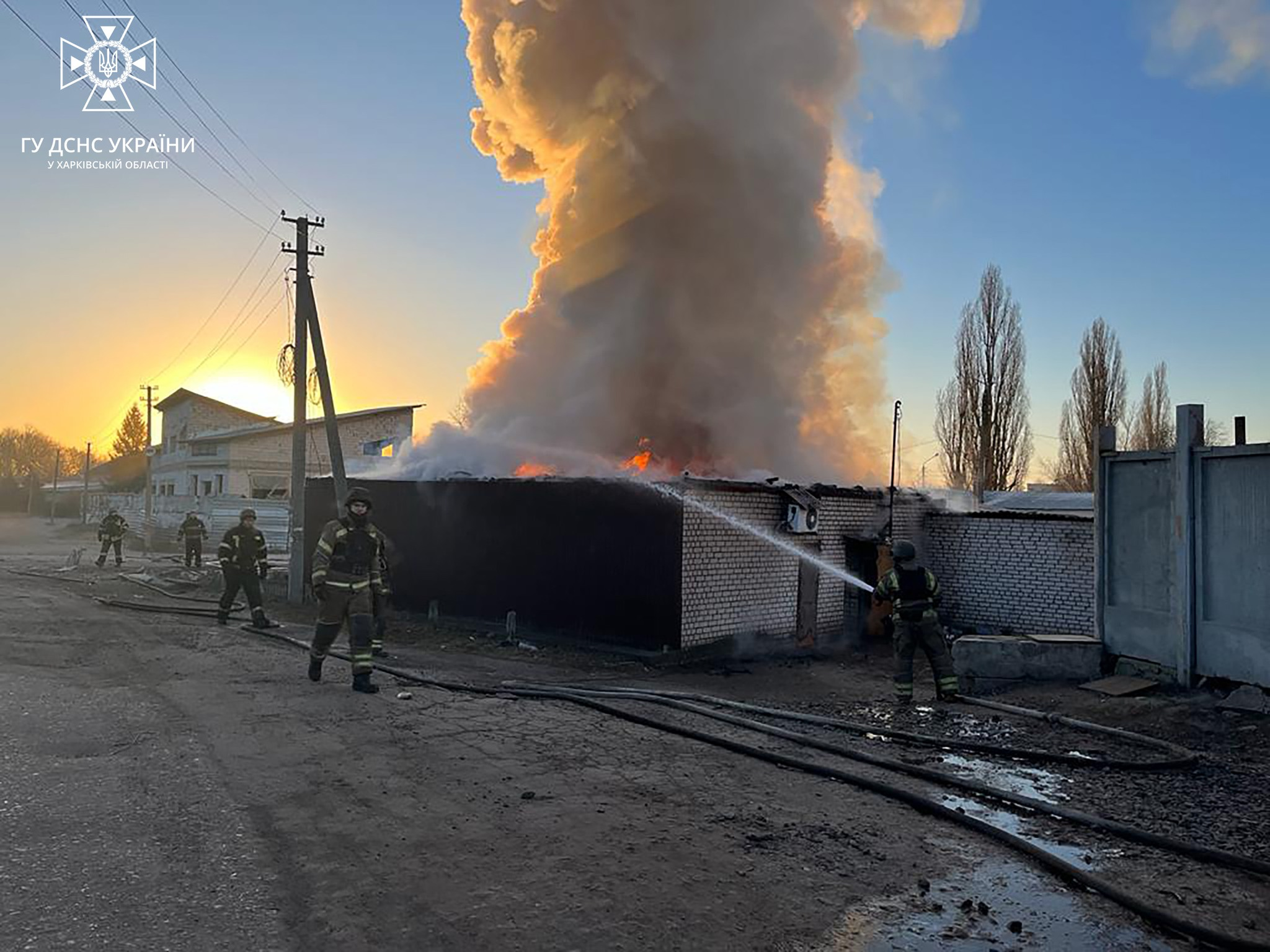
Aftermath of Russian shelling of Kupiansk, 25 January 2023

On 3 March 2023, Ukrainian authorities ordered an evacuation of civilians from the city due to advances of the Russian Armed Forces around Kupiansk and Bakhmut.

On 14 November 2024, two Russian armoured vehicle columns advanced into the city from the northeast, though reportedly had tenuous control over the area. Russian forces made further progress into the city the following day, with fighting reportedly ongoing in the industrial area, and were reportedly setting up supply lines to assist in further offensive efforts. After facing logistical problems, Russian forces withdraw from Kupiansk in late November.

At the end of November 2024, a Ukrainian official confirmed that Russian troops recently crossed over to the west bank of the Oskil River north of Kupiansk near the suspension bridge south of Novomlynsk. At the same time, Ukraine's General Staff admitted that Russian forces launched attacks on the west bank near Fyholivka, Holubivka, and Kindrashivka. The fighting continued into December 2024, when Ukrainian troops reported that Russian forces were attempting to cross the Oskil river a few kilometres north of Kupiansk city.

At the end of January 2025, the Institute for the Study of War assessed that Russian forces are attempting to use their bridgeheads across the Oskil river to support their advances and encircle Kupiansk from the northwest, as well as set the ground for future advances and offensives into Kharkiv Oblast. In September 2025, the Russian Ministry of Defense stated that the seizure of Kupiansk would support Russian efforts to advance toward Sloviansk and Kramatorsk (both south of Kupiansk) and seize Ukraine's fortress belt in Donetsk Oblast, which further highlighted the strategic importance of the city during the war.

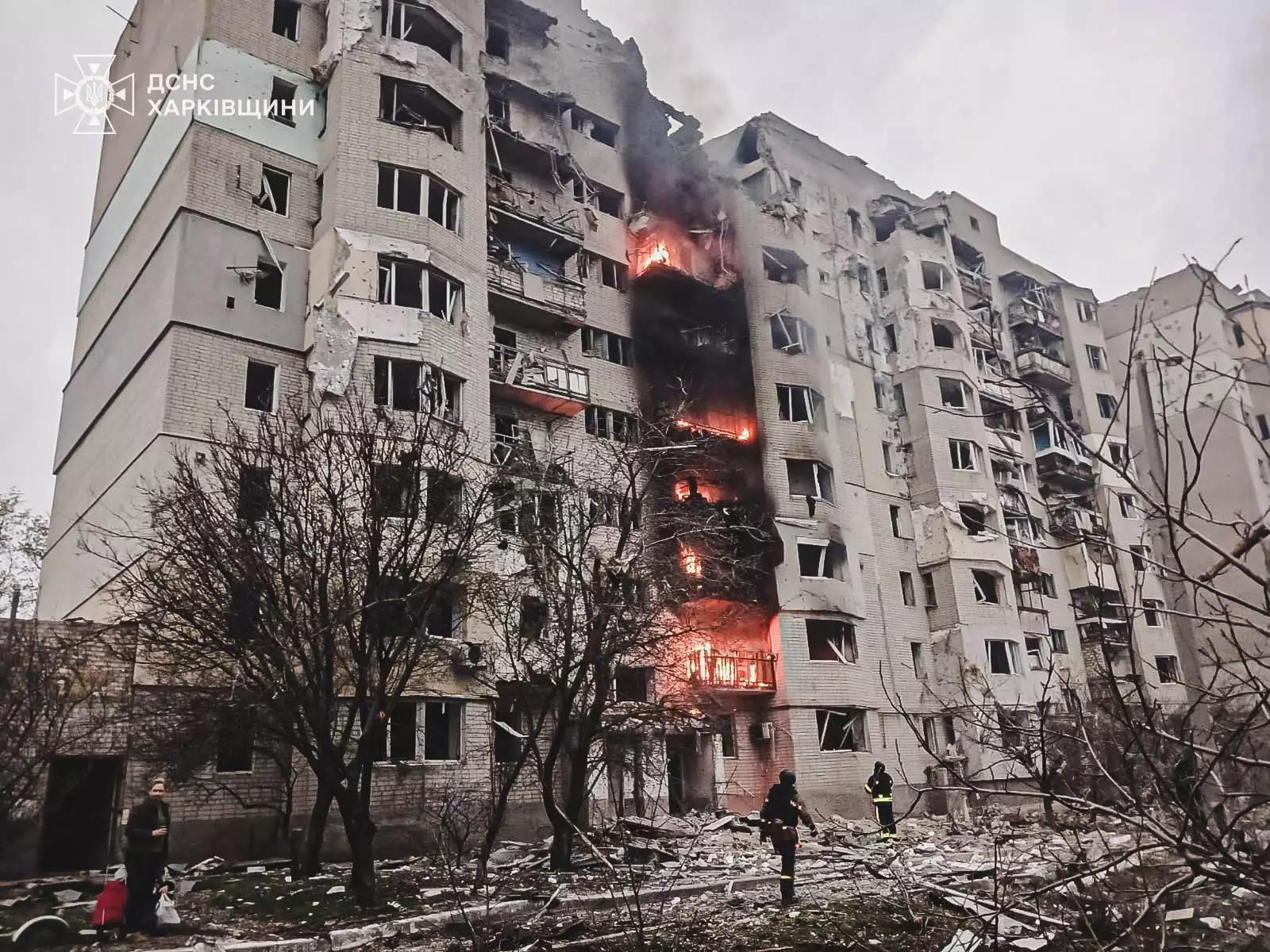
Residential building after Russian bombing, 6 April 2025

On 24 May 2025, Ukrainska Pravda reported that over 90% of Kupiansk is destroyed or damaged from the bombardment.

During the Kupiansk offensive, misinformation and false intelligence reports from the Russian Ministry of Defence have sparked friendly fire incidents among Russian troops. By early October 2025 the city was again partially occupied by Russia. On 20 November 2025, the Russian Defense Ministry announced the full capture of Kupiansk, although the Ukrainian military denies this. On 12 December, President Zelenskyy confirmed with his visit that the city is not captured.

Uawire reports that "The operation to liberate Kupyansk remains far from complete", and that "Clearing continues “house by house,” complicated by the presence of civilians “whom the Russians use as human shields.""

== Population ==
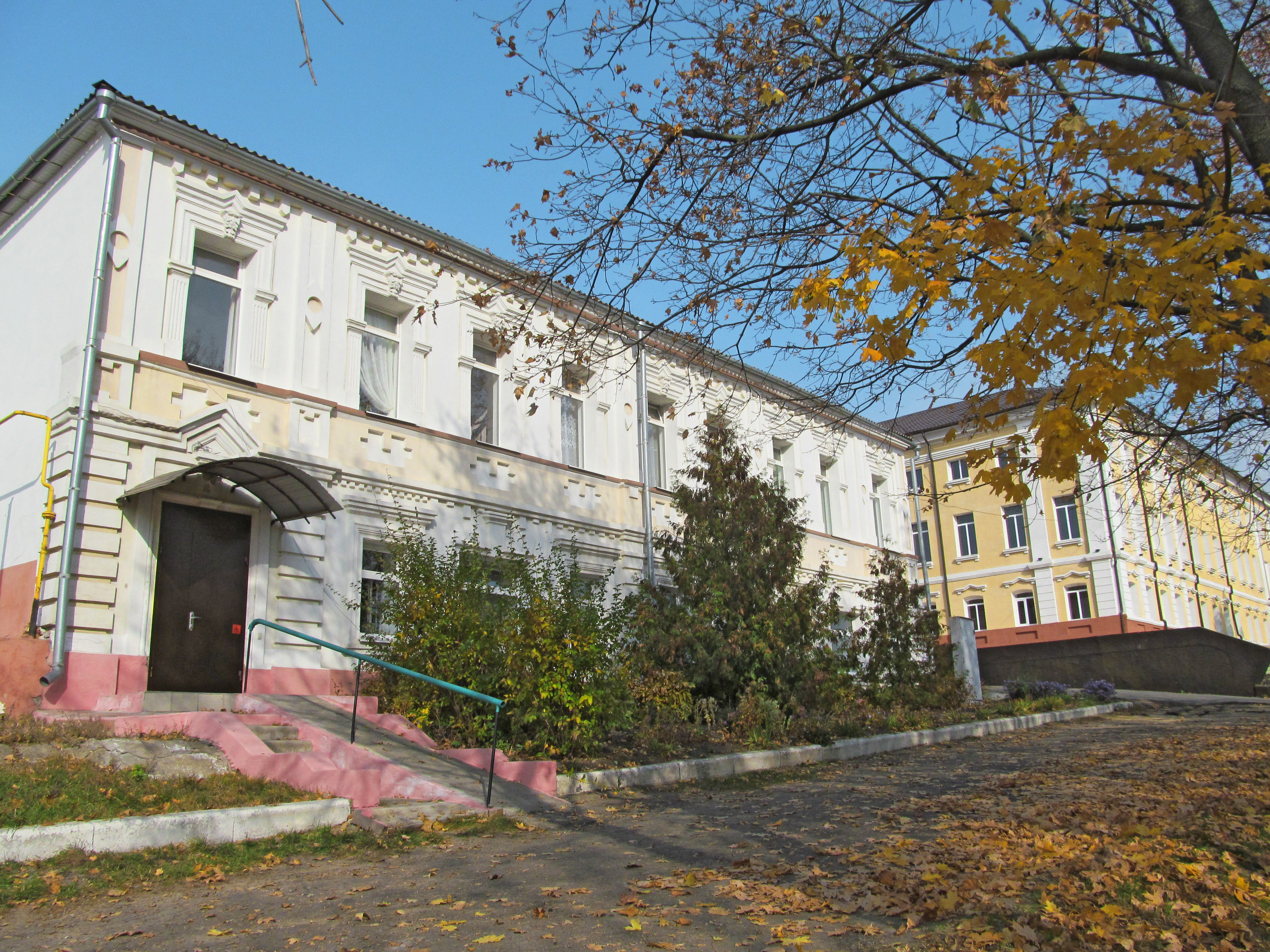
Childrens Music School

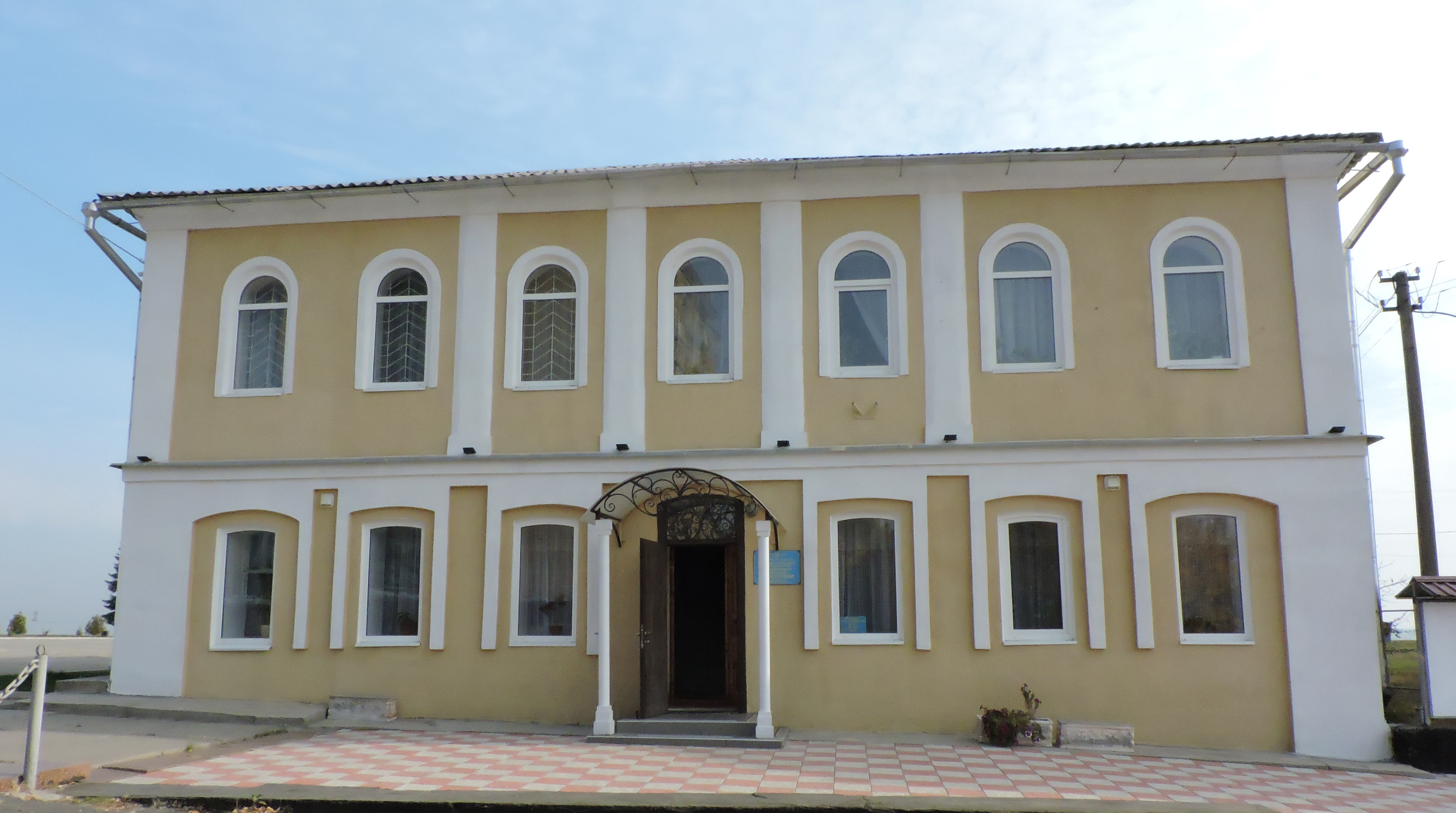
Kupiansk Central Raion Library

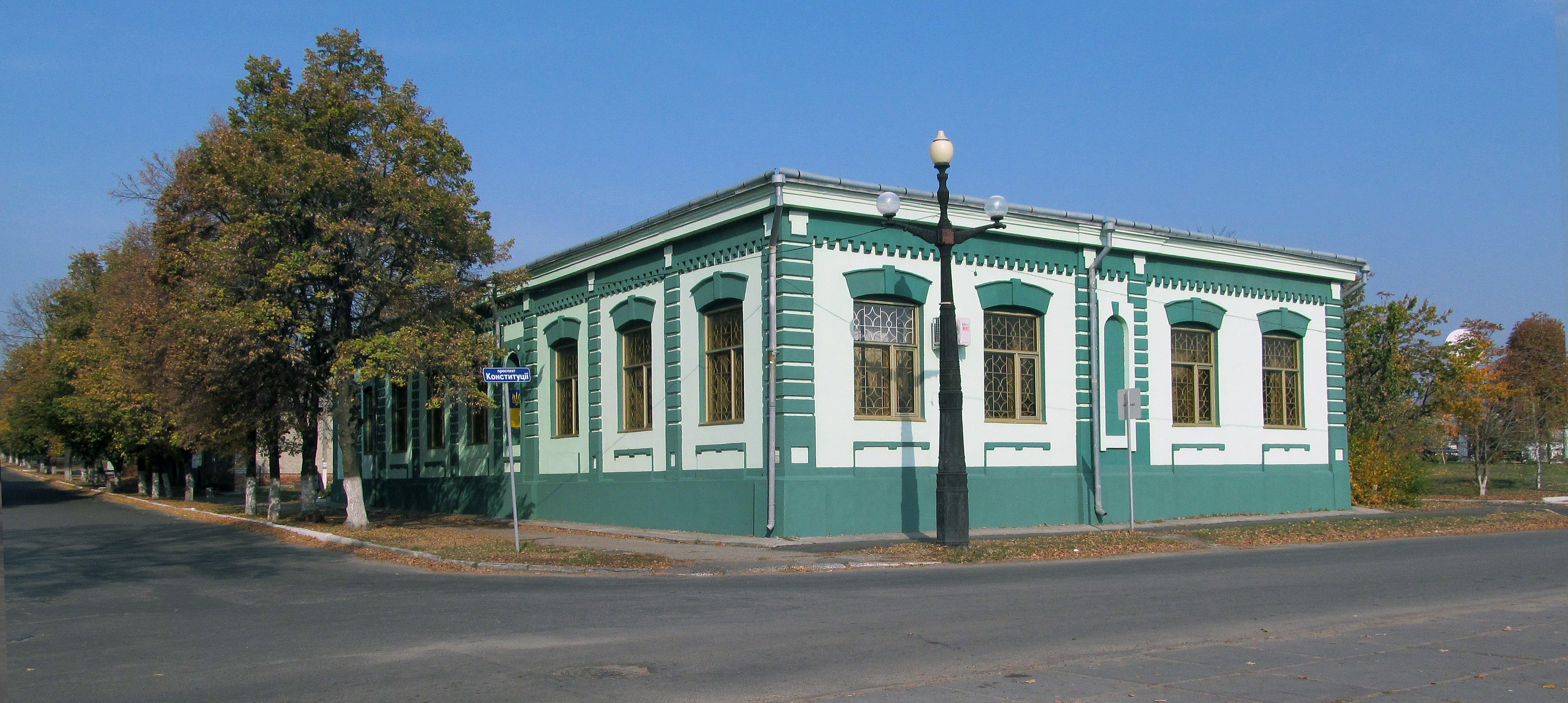
Kupiansk Office of the State Treasury of Ukraine

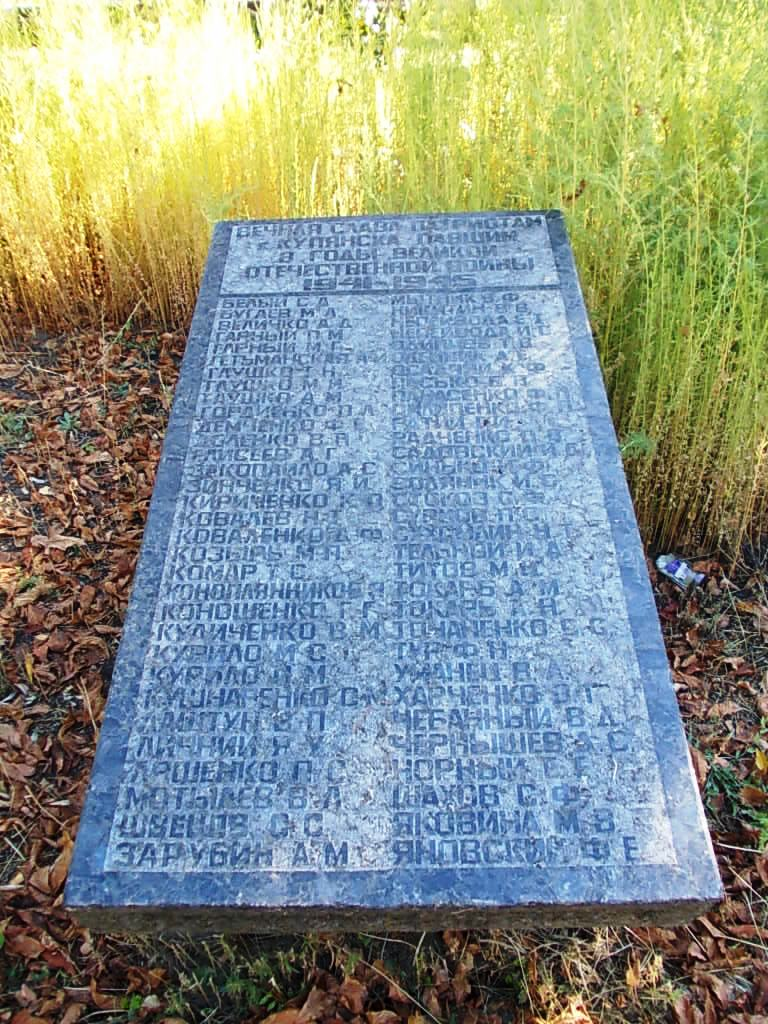
Mass grave of the victims of Nazi Germany

=== Ethnicity and language ===
Ethnic makeup of the city as of 2001:

Ethnic groups in Kupiansk
	percent
Ukrainians	77.73%
Russians	16.20%
Belarusians	0.40%
Armenians	0.18%

Distribution of the population by native language according to the 2001 census:

Language	Percentage
Ukrainian	78.03%
Russian	19.59%
other/undecided	2.38%

== Geography ==
=== Climate ===
Climate data for Kupiansk (1981–2010)
Month	Jan	Feb	Mar	Apr	May	Jun	Jul	Aug	Sep	Oct	Nov	Dec	Year
Mean daily maximum °C (°F)	−1.7 (28.9)	−1.1 (30.0)	5.1 (41.2)	15.3 (59.5)	22.3 (72.1)	26.0 (78.8)	28.1 (82.6)	27.4 (81.3)	20.9 (69.6)	13.0 (55.4)	4.4 (39.9)	−0.6 (30.9)	13.3 (55.9)
Daily mean °C (°F)	−4.5 (23.9)	−4.6 (23.7)	0.8 (33.4)	9.5 (49.1)	15.9 (60.6)	19.7 (67.5)	21.7 (71.1)	20.4 (68.7)	14.5 (58.1)	8.0 (46.4)	1.2 (34.2)	−3.4 (25.9)	8.3 (46.9)
Mean daily minimum °C (°F)	−7.3 (18.9)	−7.8 (18.0)	−2.8 (27.0)	4.1 (39.4)	9.5 (49.1)	13.7 (56.7)	15.5 (59.9)	13.8 (56.8)	8.8 (47.8)	3.6 (38.5)	−1.6 (29.1)	−6.1 (21.0)	3.6 (38.5)
Average precipitation mm (inches)	42.9 (1.69)	41.4 (1.63)	38.7 (1.52)	34.7 (1.37)	48.6 (1.91)	73.6 (2.90)	61.5 (2.42)	39.7 (1.56)	47.0 (1.85)	43.8 (1.72)	45.9 (1.81)	45.0 (1.77)	562.8 (22.16)
Average precipitation days (≥ 1.0 mm)	9.5	8.6	8.1	6.3	7.1	8.8	7.0	5.3	7.0	6.3	7.1	8.5	89.6
Average relative humidity (%)	83.8	81.2	76.6	65.4	61.3	65.2	64.5	64.4	70.8	77.1	84.1	85.2	73.3
Source: World Meteorological Organization
