= Kivsharivka =

Rural settlement in Kharkiv Oblast, Ukraine

Kivsharivka Ківшарівка
- Rural settlement
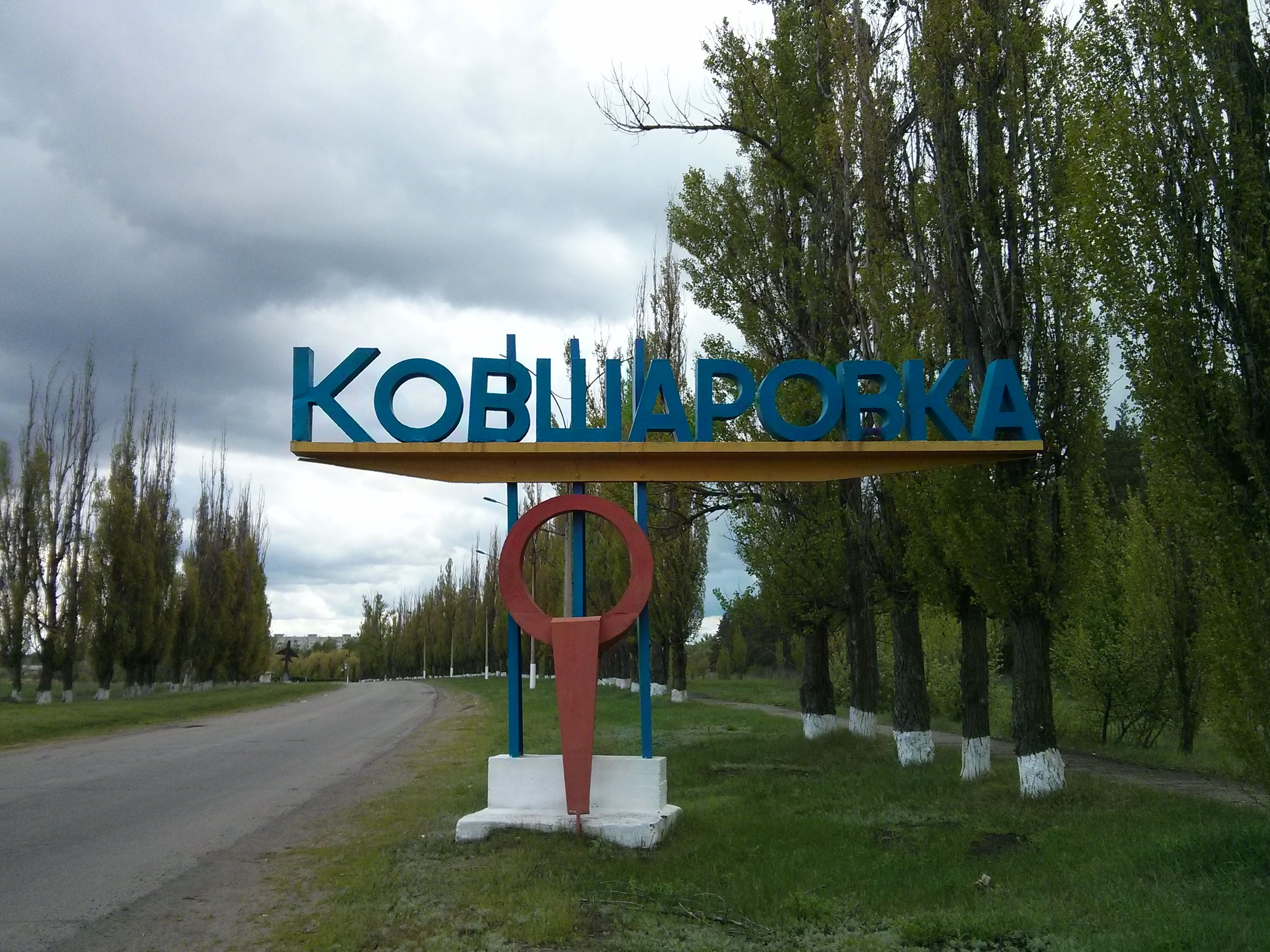
- Town entrance sign
- Interactive map of Kivsharivka
- Location in Kharkiv Oblast Location in Ukraine
- Coordinates: 49°37′44″N 37°40′59″E
- Country: Ukraine
- Oblast: Kharkiv Oblast
- Raion: Kupiansk Raion
- Hromada: Kupiansk urban hromada

Area
  - Total: 054 km^{2} (21 sq mi)
- Elevation: 96 m (315 ft)

Population (2022)
  - Total: 17,960
  - Density: 330/km^{2} (860/sq mi)
- Time zone: UTC+2 (EET)
  - Summer (DST): UTC+3 (EEST)
- Post Code: 63734
- Area code: +380 5742
- KATOTTH: UA63080090020061282

Kivsharivka (Ukrainian: Ківшарівка; Russian: Ковшаровка, romanized: Kovsharovka) is a rural settlement in Kupiansk Raion, Kharkiv Oblast, Ukraine. It is located on the left bank of the Oskil, in the drainage basin of the Don. Kivsharivka belongs to Kupiansk urban hromada, one of the hromadas of Ukraine. Population: 17,960 (2022 estimate).

== Geography ==
Kivsharivka is located on the left bank of the Oskol River. The settlement of Kupiansk-Vuzlovyi is 1.5 km upstream. The village of Glushkovka is 7 km downstream. The village of Osinovo is on the opposite bank of the river. The intermittent Dubovka River flows through the settlement, and the village of Novoosinovo is adjacent to it just upstream. Large forested areas adjoin the settlement.

== History ==
In 1870, the village of Kovsharovka existed on the left bank of the Oskol River. Between 1963 and 1967, a large Kupyansk Foundry was built and commissioned in Kovsharovka, leading to population growth and an increase in the built-up area. In 1987, the urban-type settlement of Kovsharovka emerged from the merger of the villages of Pritulova, Zaborovka, and Kovsharovka.

Until 18 July 2020, Kivsharivka belonged to Kupiansk Municipality. The municipality was abolished in July 2020 as part of the administrative reform of Ukraine, which reduced the number of raions of Kharkiv Oblast to seven. The area of Kupiansk Municipality was merged into Kupiansk Raion. As of August 2023 there still lived around 1,500 people.

Between February and September 2022, the village was occupied by the Russian Federation. On 28 September 2022, it was captured by the AFU. Until 26 January 2024, Kivsharivka was designated urban-type settlement. On this day, a new law entered into force which abolished this status, and Kivsharivka became a rural settlement. By 29 March 2026, Russian forces claimed control over the village, Ukrainian sources denied it.

== Demographics ==
=== Population ===
In January 1989 the population was 23,772 inhabitants. According to the 2001 Ukrainian census, the village population was 23,529 inhabitants.

=== Language ===
Distribution of the population by native language according to the 2001 census:

Language	Percentage
Ukrainian	58.3%
Russian	31.3%
other/undecided	0.4%

== Economy ==
Kivsharivka railway station is on the railway connecting Kupiansk and Sviatohirsk, with further connections to Kharkiv and Sloviansk. There is infrequent passenger traffic.

The settlement has access to Highway H26 connecting Kharkiv with Sievierodonetsk, as well as by local roads to Borova and further to Izium.

The village has only one significant enterprise – the Kupyansk mechanical assembly plant.

== Notable people ==
- Anikeev, Yuri Vladimirovich (born 1983) is a Ukrainian athlete specializing in checkers.
- Koshevoy, Evgeniy Viktorovich (born 1983) - Ukrainian actor of the studio "95 quarter", KVN actor.
- Zhivolup, Mikhail Andreevich (1909–1991) - Major General, participant in the Great Patriotic War, Hero of the Soviet Union.
- Savlepov, Anton Olegovich (born 1988) is a Ukrainian musician, showman, stand-up comedian, former lead singer of the group «Quest Pistols», member of the group «Agon».

== Gallery ==
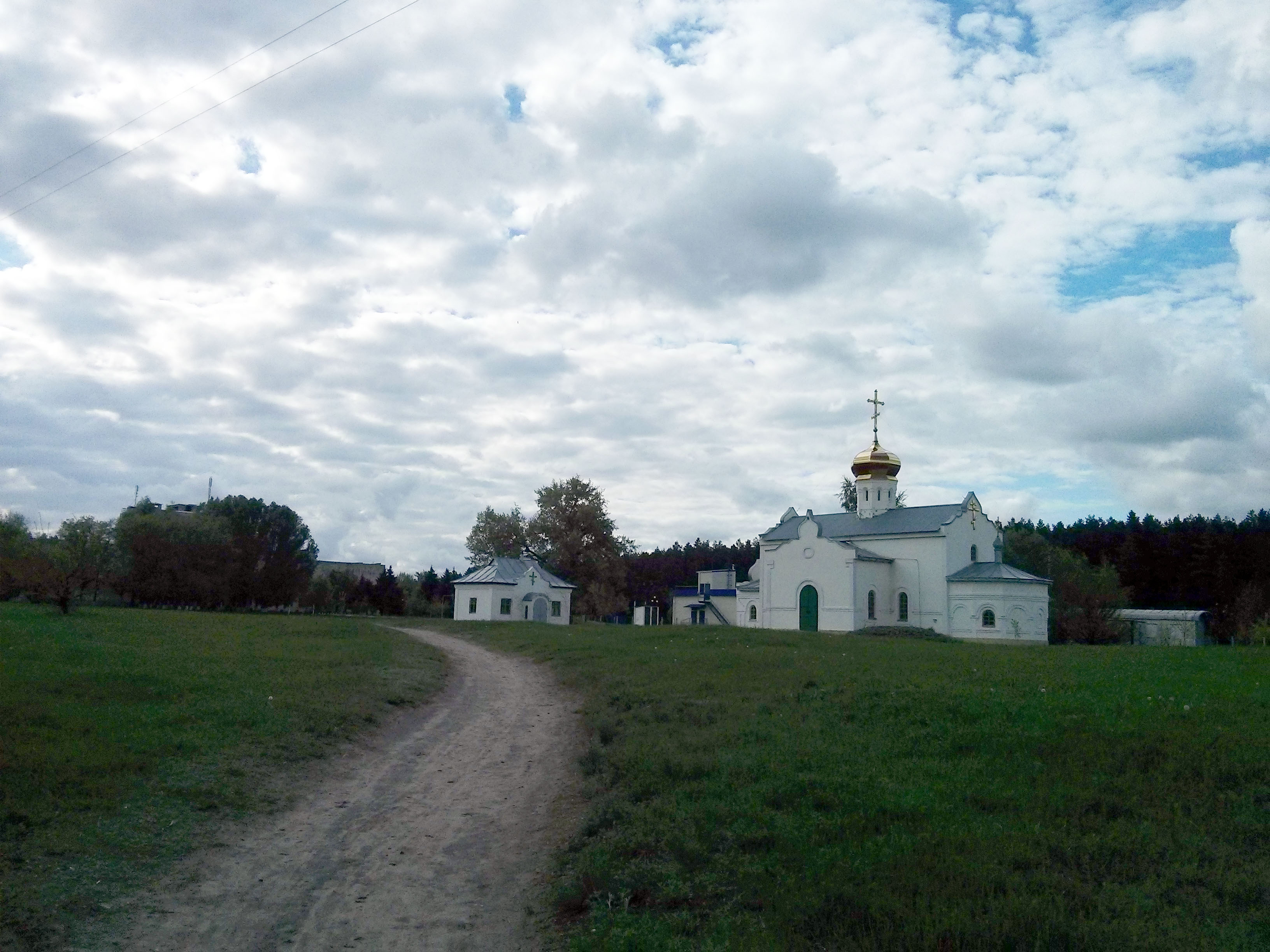
One of the landscapes of Kivsharivka

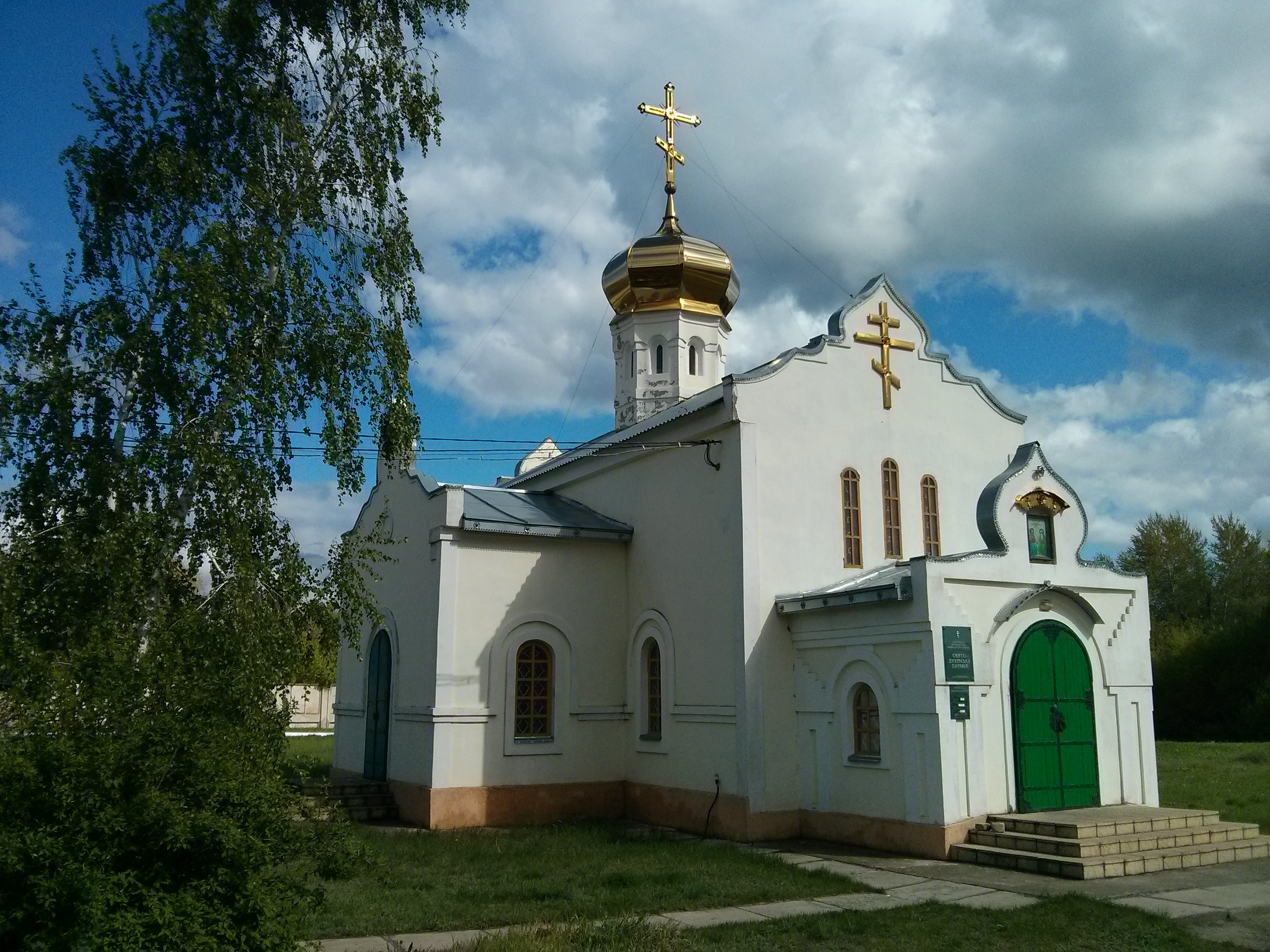
Church of the Holy Spirit Parish

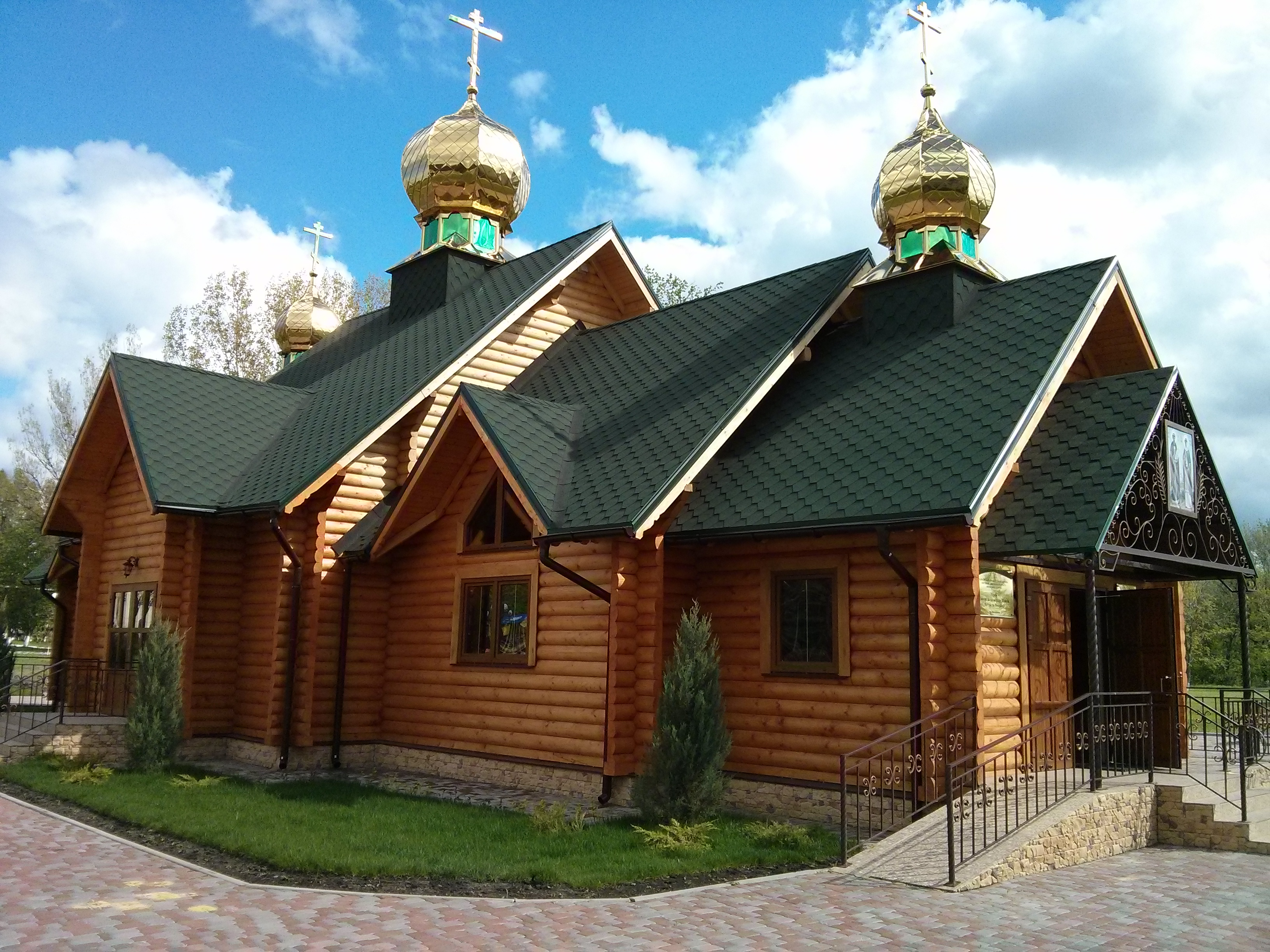
Church of the Holy Benevolent Princes Peter and Fevronia

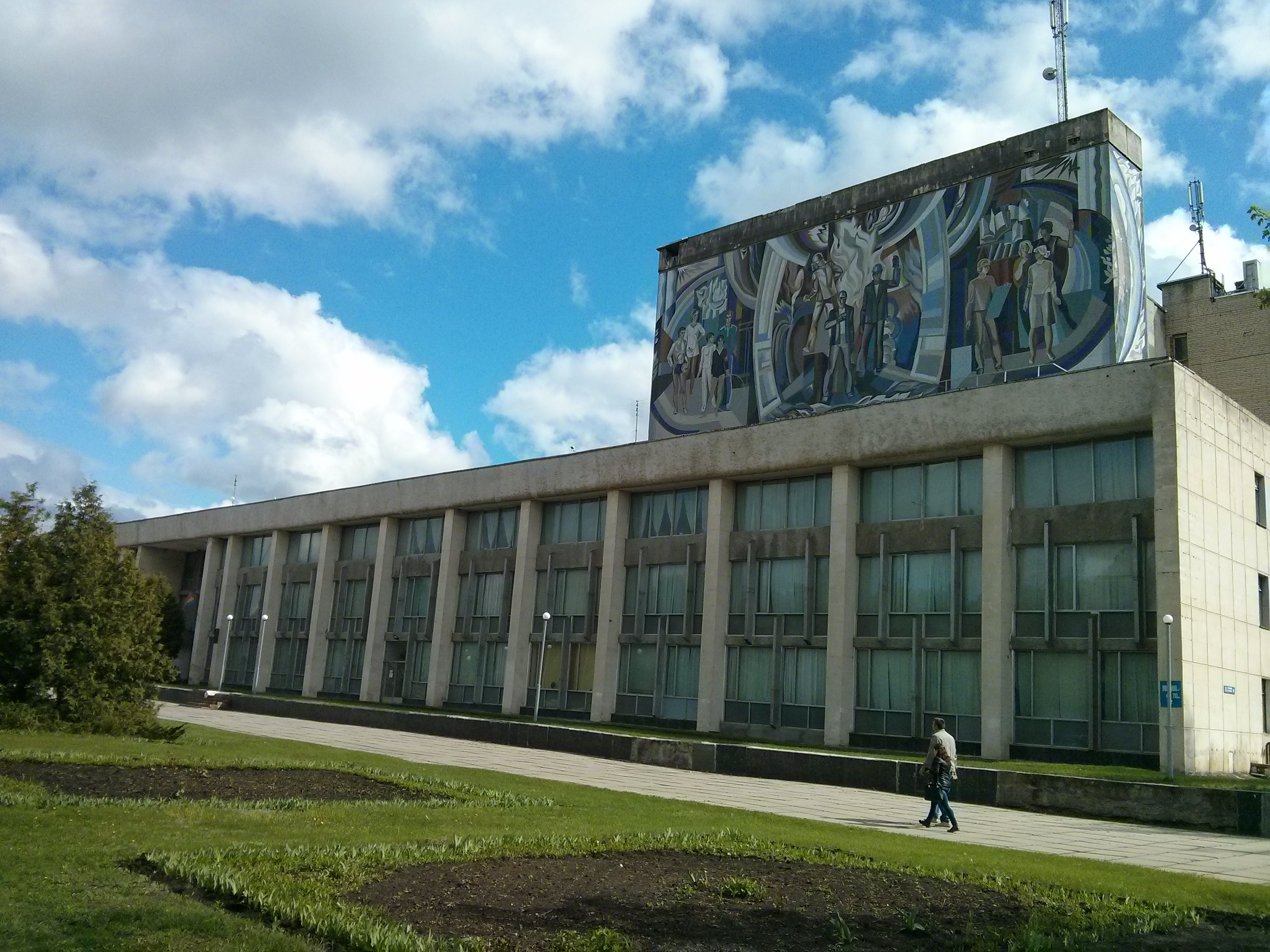
Palace of Culture named after V.I. Koshelev

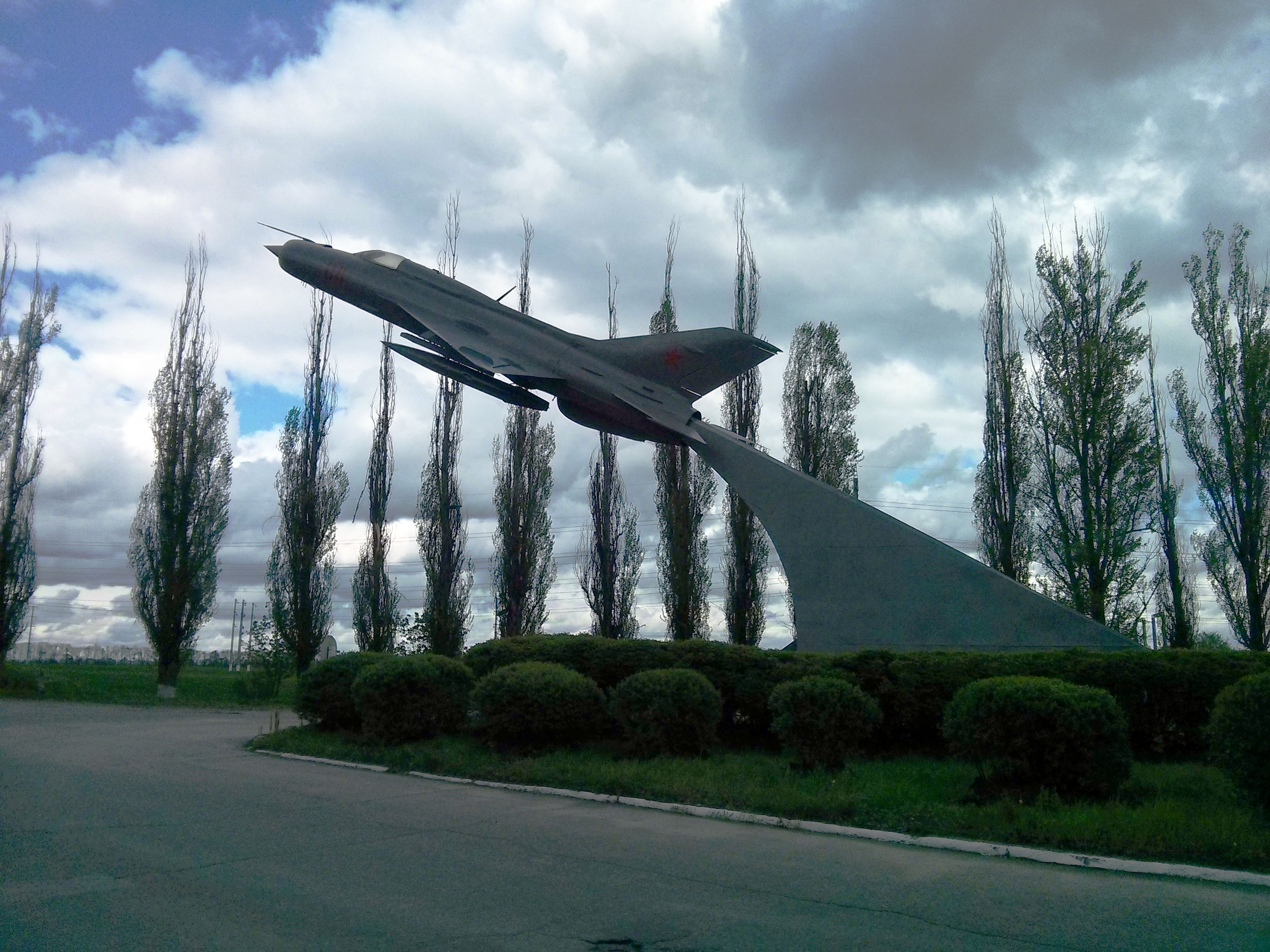
Memorial to the memory of the soldiers-aviators of the Great Patriotic War

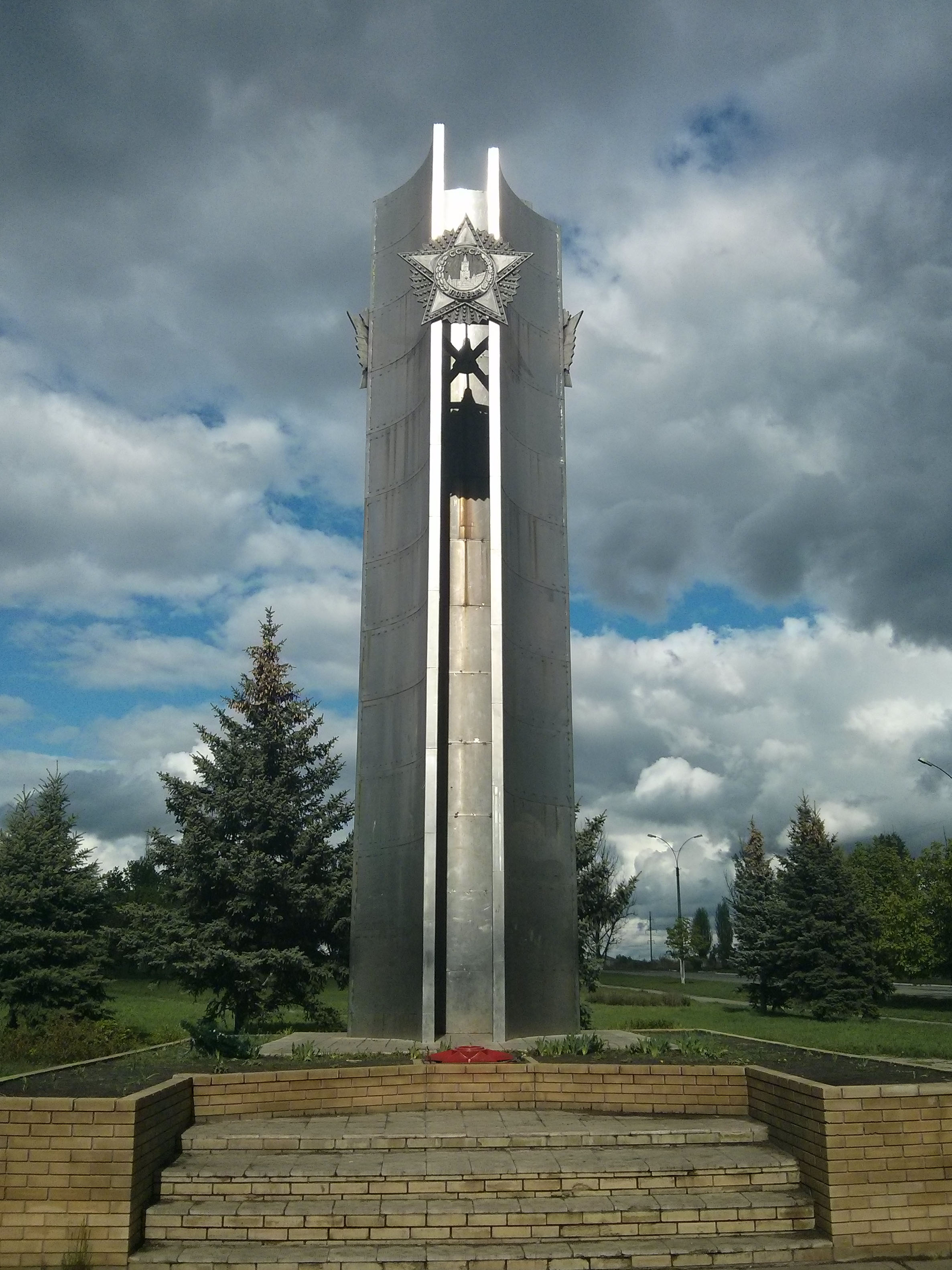
Memorial stele of the soldiers of the Great Patriotic War

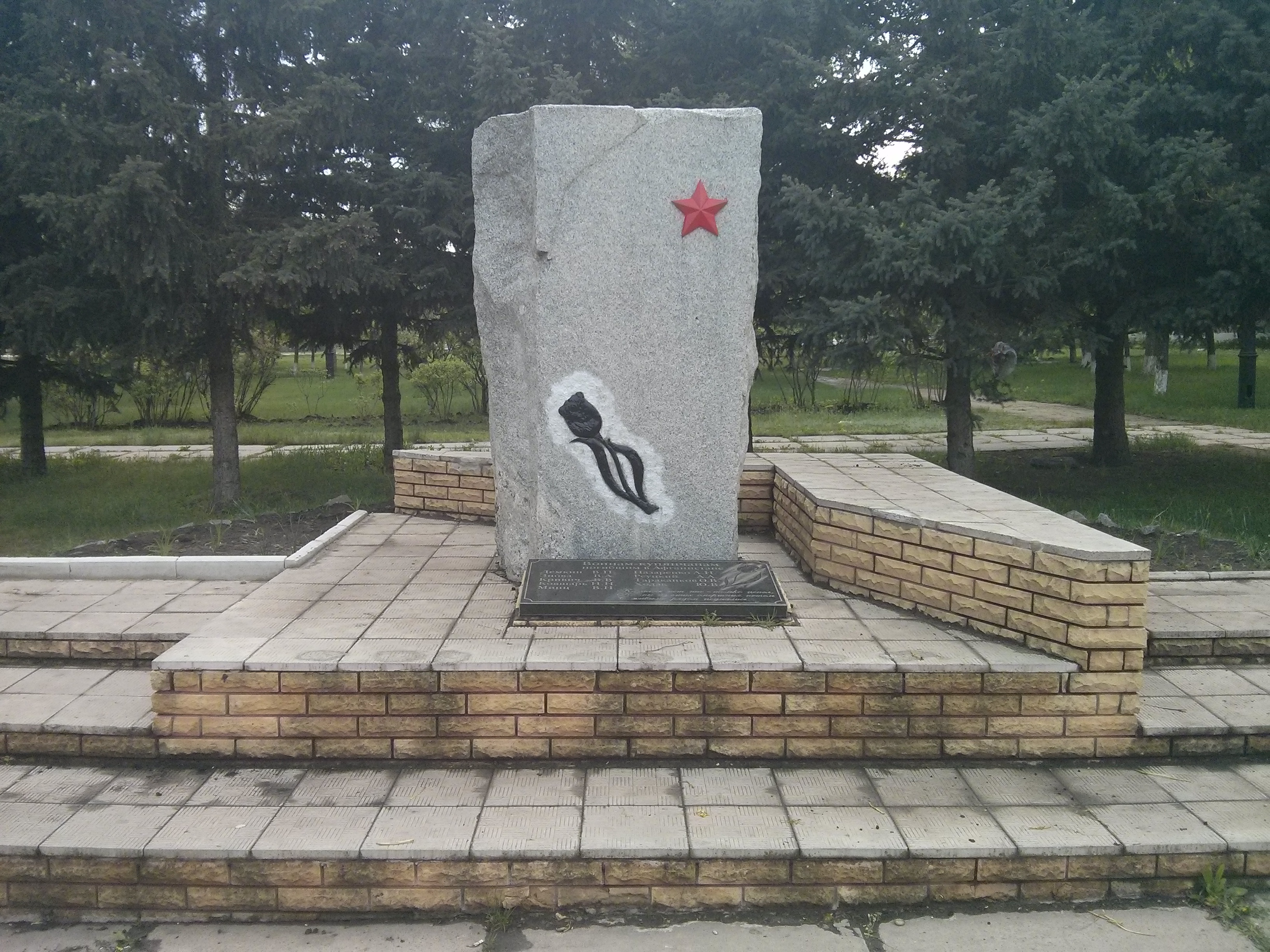
Memorial to the soldiers of the Afghan War

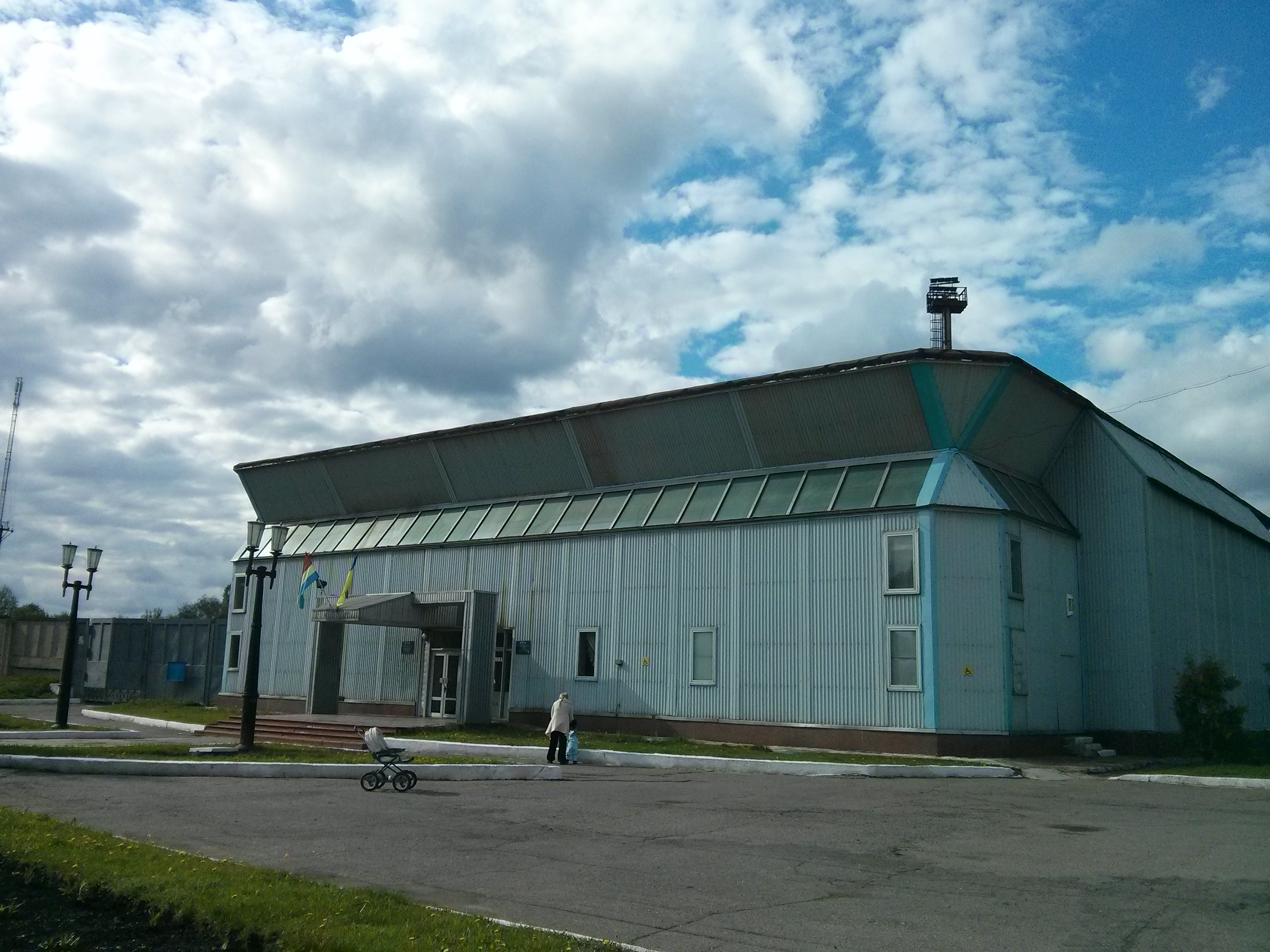
Physical education and health complex

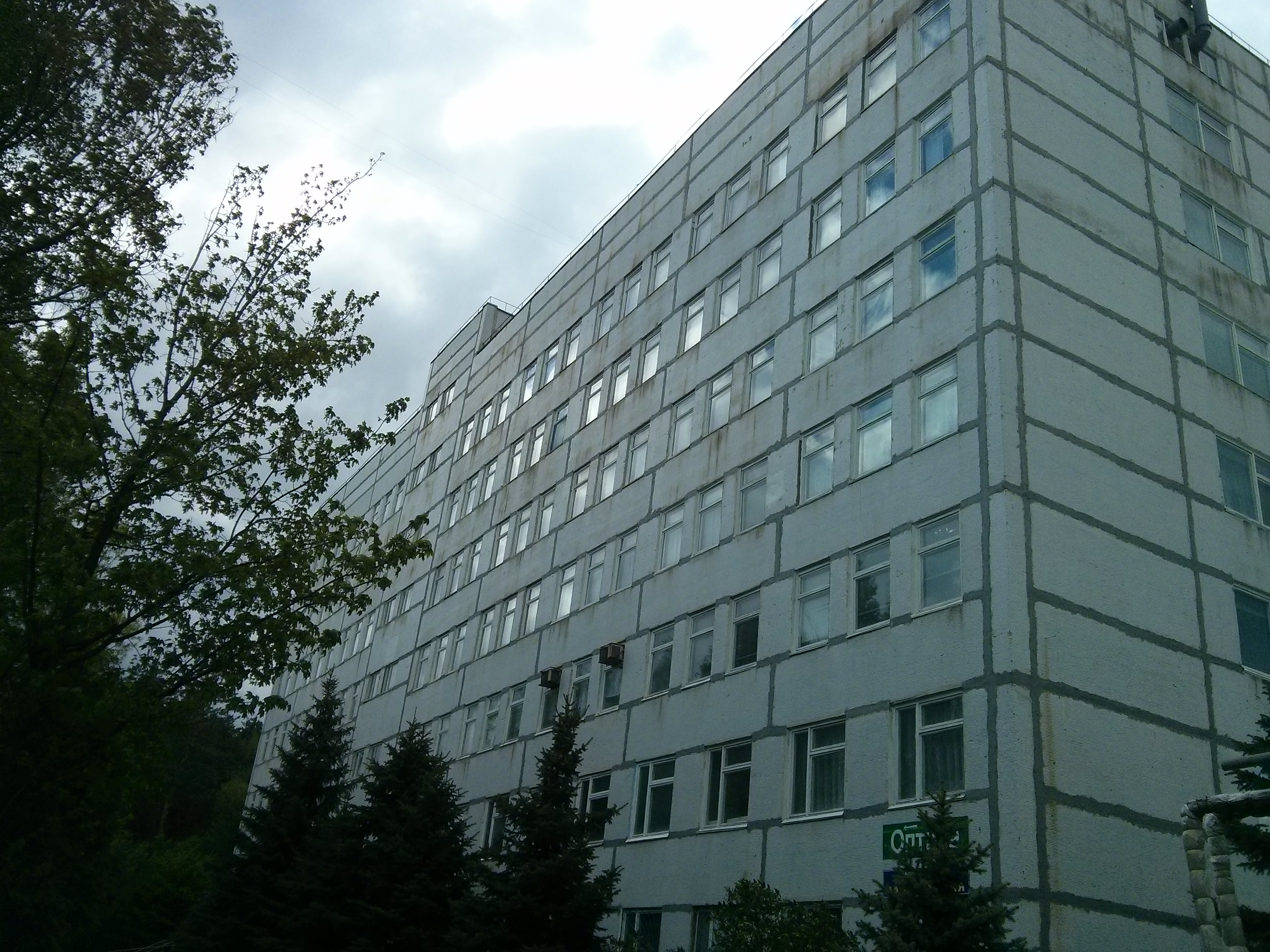
Polyclinic Department of Kupyansk City Hospital
