= Luhansk Oblast campaign order of battle =

This is the order of battle for the Luhansk Oblast campaign of the eastern front of the Russian invasion of Ukraine

== Russian forces ==
=== Kupiansk front ===
- Russian Armed Forces
  - Russian Ground Forces
    - Moscow Military District
      - 1st Guards Tank Army
        - 2nd Motorized Rifle Division
          - 1st Motorized Tank Regiment
          - 1st Motorized Rifle Regiment
          - 15th Motorized Rifle Regiment
        - 4th Guards Tank Division
          - 12th Tank Regiment
        - 27th Motorized Rifle Brigade
        - 47th Tank Division
          - 272nd Motorized Rifle Regiment
          - 375th Separate Anti-Tank Artillery Battalion
      - 20th Combined Arms Army
    - Leningrad Military District
      - 6th Combined Arms Army
        - 9th Artillery Brigade
        - 25th Motorized Rifle Brigade
        - 69th Motorized Rifle Division
          - 344th Motorized Rifle Regiment
          - 350th Motorized Rifle Regiment
        - 11th Army Corps
          - 7th Motorized Rifle Regiment
  - Main Intelligence Directorate
    - Special Forces of the Main Directorate
      - 16th Spetsnaz Brigade

=== Borova front ===
Russian Armed Forces

- Russian Ground Forces
  - Moscow Military District
    - 1st Guards Tank Army
      - 4th Guards Tank Division
        - 12th Tank Regiment
        - 423rd Motorized Rifle Regiment
    - 20th Combined Arms Army
      - 3rd Motorized Rifle Division
        - 237th Tank Regiment
        - 252nd Motor Rifle Regiment
        - 752nd Motorized Rifle Regiment
  - Leningrad Military District
    - 6th Combined Arms Army
      - 25th Motorized Rifle Brigade
- Main Intelligence Directorate
  - Special Forces of the Main Directorate
    - 16th Spetsnaz Brigade

=== Northeast Donetsk front ===
- Russian Armed Forces
  - Russian Ground Forces
    - Moscow Military District
      - 20th Combined Arms Army
        - 144th Guards Motor Rifle Division
          - 283rd Motorized Rifle Regiment
          - 488th Motorized Rifle Regiment
          - 1428th Motorized Rifle Regiment
    - Central Military District
      - 25th Combined Arms Army
        - 67th Motorized Rifle Division
          - 31st Motorized Rifle Regiment
    - Southern Military District
      - 8th Guards Combined Arms Army
        - 238th Artillery Brigade
          - Reconnaissance and strike battalion
            - Berkut Group
      - 3rd Combined Arms Army
        - 2nd Artillery Brigade
        - 7th Motorized Rifle Brigade
- Main Intelligence Directorate
  - Special Forces of the Main Directorate
    - 16th Spetsnaz Brigade

== Ukrainian forces ==
=== Kupiansk front ===
- Armed Forces of Ukraine
  - Ukrainian Ground Forces
    - Operational Command North
      - 10th Army Corps
        - 116th Mechanized Brigade
      - 30th Mechanized Brigade
    - Operational Command East
      - 92nd Assault Brigade
        - 429th Separate Regiment of Unmanned Aerial Systems
      - 43rd Mechanized Brigade
    - Operational Command West
      - 14th Mechanized Brigade
      - 10th Mountain Assault Brigade
        - 8th Mountain Assault Infantry Battalion
    - Operational Command South
      - 40th Artillery Brigade
  - Ukrainian Air Assault Forces
    - 77th Airmobile Brigade
  - Unmanned Systems Forces
    - 412th Unmanned Aerial Vehicle Regiment
  - Territorial Defence Forces
    - 114th Territorial Defense Brigade
- Ministry of Internal Affairs
  - State Border Guard Service
    - Pomsta Brigade
      - Phoenix Regiment of Unmanned Systems
  - National Guard of Ukraine
    - Offensive Guard
      - 15th Operational Brigade
        - 2nd Operational Battalion
      - 1st Presidential Operational Brigade

=== Northeast Donetsk front ===
- 3rd Assault Brigade
- 60th Mechanized Brigade
- 63rd Mechanized Brigade
- 66th Mechanized Brigade

== See also ==
- Kupiansk offensive
- Northeast Donetsk campaign
