= Luhansk Oblast campaign =

Military campaign during the Russo-Ukrainian war

- Part of the eastern front of the Russo-Ukrainian war
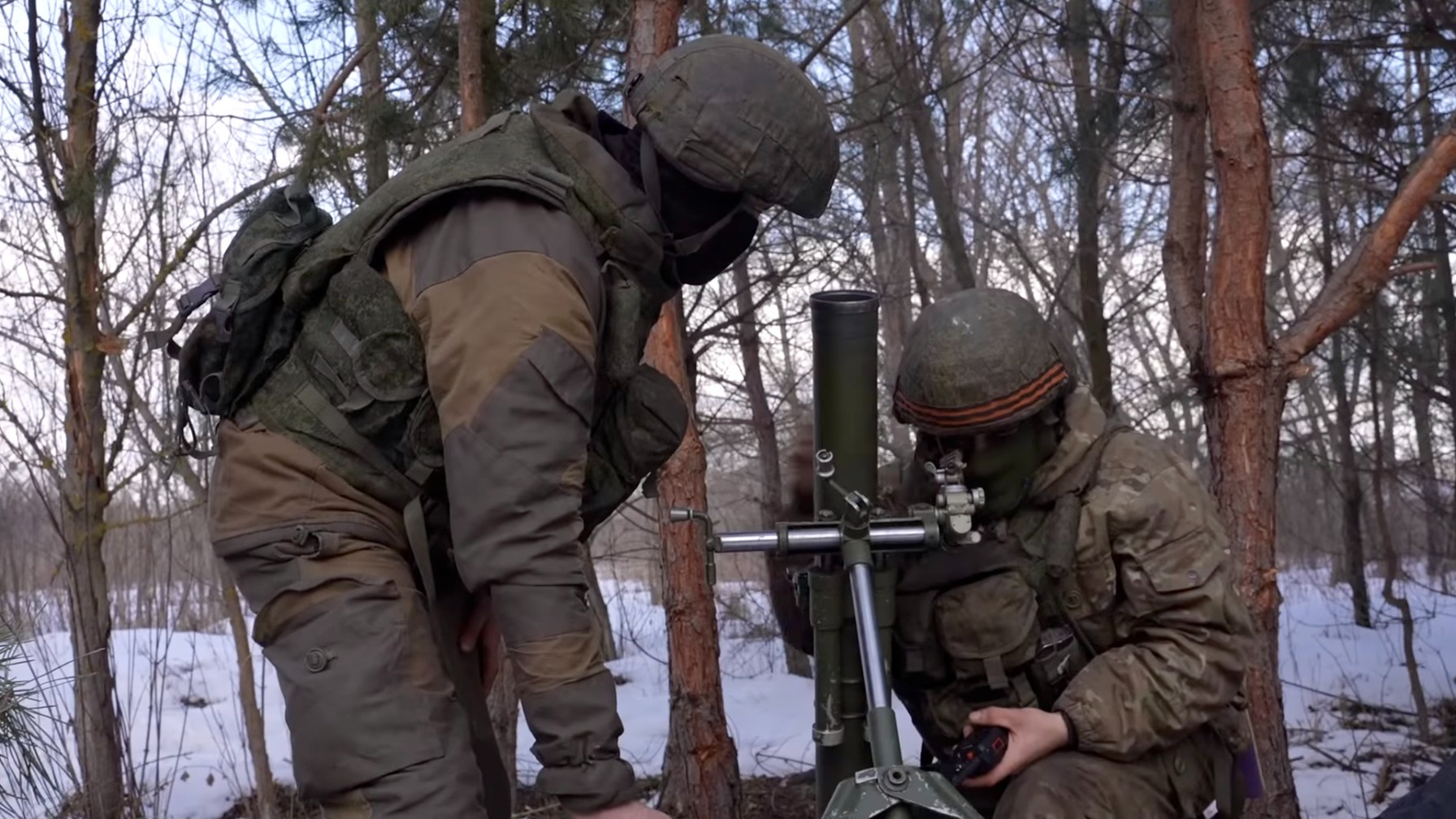
- Russian mortar team in northeastern Ukraine in February 2023
Date	19 September 2022 – present (4 years, 1 month, 2 weeks and 5 days)
Location	Luhansk Oblast, eastern Kharkiv Oblast and northeast Donetsk Oblast, Ukraine
Status	Ongoing
Territorial changes	Russia controls 99% of the Luhansk Oblast and parts of Northeastern Donetsk Oblast and eastern Kharkiv Oblast as of August 2025

Belligerents
Russia	Ukraine

Units involved
Order of battle	Order of battle

Strength
Per Ukraine: ~120,000 (as of July 2023); ~57,000 (as of February 2024)	Unknown

Since 19 September 2022, a military campaign has taken place along a frontline in western parts of Luhansk Oblast and far-eastern parts of Kharkiv Oblast amid the Russo-Ukrainian war. The frontline has been referred to as the Svatove–Kreminna line or the Kupiansk–Svatove–Kreminna–Bilohorivka line, after the major settlements that lie along it.

== Background ==
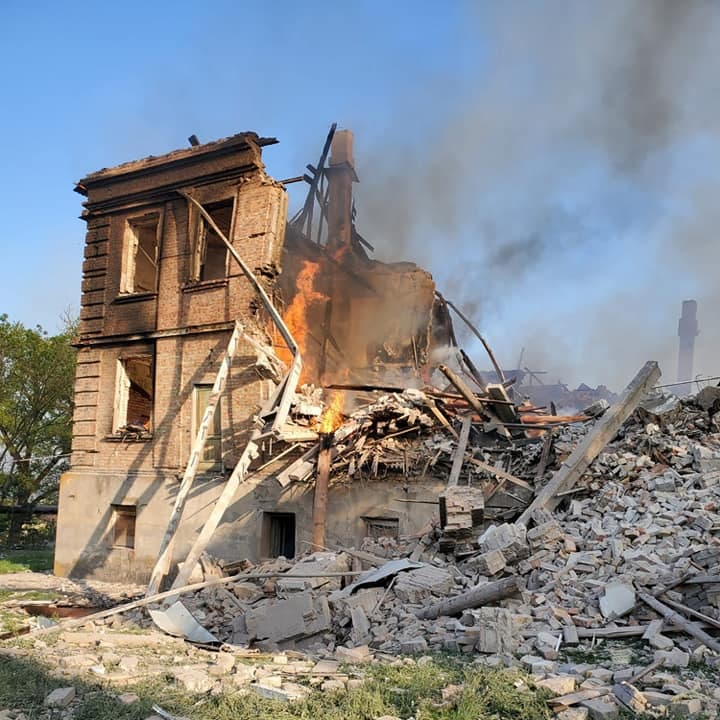
The Bilohorivka school after the Russian bombing in May 2022

The city of Svatove fell on 6 March 2022, less than two weeks into the Russian invasion of Ukraine. Kreminna, a city in Luhansk Oblast, was captured by Russian forces on 19 April.

Between 5 and 13 May, Russian forces began a series of military engagements on the Lyman-Sievierodonetsk front. The settlement of Bilohorivka in Luhansk Oblast was one of the places where Russian forces tried unsuccessfully to cross the Siverskyi Donets, becoming a hot spot of fighting in early May 2022.

With the fall of Lysychansk and its western outskirts in July 2022, Russia and its puppet state the Luhansk People's Republic declared full control of Luhansk Oblast for the first time, achieving an objective of the Russian campaign. Bilohorivka became one of the last settlements in Luhansk Oblast to come under Russian control.

== Campaign ==
=== Kreminna–Lyman front ===
On the night of 27–28 September 2022, Ukrainian forces crossed the Siverskyi Donets River at Dronivka, stormed the Siverskyi Donets Forest Park, and successfully blocked the critical Kreminna-Torske road. Surviving troops from the BARS-13 detachment and 20th Guards Combined Arms Army, previously based in Lyman where they sustained heavy casualties during the battle for the town, reestablished themselves in Kreminna.

On 2 October, Ukrainian forces began heavily bombarding Russian positions in Kreminna, advancing as far as the R-66 highway. The following day, Ukrainian troops managed to intersect a segment of the highway between Chervonopopivka and Pishchane, although were pushed back by Russian forces. To counter Ukrainian advances, Russian forces had mined all access roads to Kreminna and Svatove, according to Luhansk Regional Military Administration head Serhiy Haidai.

Between 2 and 13 October, Ukrainian troops recaptured 14 towns and villages, including Borova, along the Kharkiv-Luhansk border. Ukrainian forces also advanced towards Chervonopopivka on the Svatove-Kreminna highway, although they were pushed back from their positions by 5 October.

On 18 October, Russia attempted an assault with artillery support on Stelmakhivka, Hrekivka, Nadia and Novoiehorivka, but the attack was repulsed. Russian troops continued to shell liberated settlements.

The Ukrainian military announced that its forces had recaptured the villages of Karmazynivka and Miasozharivka on 24 October.

Both Russian and Ukrainian media reported on 9 November that fighting continued in the town's neighborhoods and that fierce street fighting continued in the following weeks and months.

During November, there were little territorial changes due to the muddy terrain, although fierce battles raged every day. Much of the Russian defense line in northern Luhansk Oblast became staffed with newly mobilized Russian reservists throughout the month.

On 16 November, the commander of BARS-13 (Russian Combat Reserve) stated that Ukrainian forces had launched a counteroffensive near the city of Kreminna and that counteroffensive operations had been extended 12 km south of Kreminna to Bilohorivka. This counteroffensive operation aimed for Ukrainian forces to regain lost territories in Luhansk south of the Donets. Powerful artillery attacks began with precision strikes from HIMARS multi-barrel rocket systems. Luhansk Oblast Governor Serhiy Haidai stated on 17 November that fierce fighting was taking place near Bilohorivka.

In early December, Ukrainian forces broke through Russian lines around Chervonopopivka, with fighting mostly centered west of the R-66 highway connecting Kreminna and Svatove. By early December, Ukraine had advanced to the hills west of Chervonopopivka.

Throughout December, relentless battles occurred along the line, with both Russian and Ukrainian forces launching daily attacks to varying degrees of success. On 18 December, a geolocated video showed Ukrainian forces advancing in the Serebryansky forest south of Kreminna.

According to Luhansk Oblast governor Serhiy Haidai, Russian forces constructed "a very powerful defense" in the region by December 2022, and were bringing "huge" quantities of reserves and equipment to renew their forces. By the end of January 2023, Ukraine said its advances along the line had slowed.

Russian airborne troops operating on the Kreminna front, February 2023. Video released by the Russian Ministry of Defence.

In early February 2023, Russian troops increased the number of attacks in the Kreminna area, to identify weak points in the defense of the Armed Forces of Ukraine.

On the night between 26 and 27 January 2023, Russian forces reportedly began preparing for a new offensive west of Kreminna, launching small ground attacks near Dibrova. Clashes broke out along the front line, with Russian forces conducting attacks towards Ukrainian positions in Chervonopopivka, Ploshchanka, Nevske, and west of Kreminna. Much of the fighting and counterattacks between Ploshchanka and Kreminna during this period were conducted by the 144th Guards Motor Rifle Division, according to the ISW.

By 8–9 February, Ukrainian government sources and independent analysts said that a Russian offensive along the Svatove-Kreminna line had begun. Luhansk Oblast governor Serhiy Haidai said "there has been a significant increase in attacks and shelling." A main goal of the Russian offensive was said to have been to push Ukrainian forces back over the Oskil River which runs through Kupiansk, as well as to make a "buffer zone" for the Luhansk region. Leonid Pasechnik, president of the Russia-controlled Luhansk People's Republic, claimed Ukraine was bringing reinforcements to the area, making the situation "very difficult". A Ukrainian soldier fighting in Kreminna stated Russian ground attacks usually consisted of small groups of around fifteen men. Drone warfare also became prevalent on the front.

Between 19 and 20 June 2023, Russian forces intensified offensive operations west of Kreminna.

On 22 June, graphic footage showed Ukrainian forces repelling attacks by Russian Storm-Z, 80th Guards Tank Regiment, and Akhmat forces in the Serebryansky forest.

By 11 July, geolocated footage indicated that Russian forces had entered eastern parts of the village of Torske 15 kilometres (9.3 mi) west of Kreminna.

On 17 July, Russian forces continued limited ground attacks southwest and south of Kreminna, but without much success. The ISW assessed that this was likely an effort to exploit Ukrainian operational focus on other sectors of the front and draw Ukrainian reserves away from critical areas along the frontline, and said Russia's effort was likely being hindered by their front-line personnel being poorly trained and equipped Storm-Z penal units.

At the end of December 2024, geolocated footage indicated that Russian forces had advanced to the northeastern and southeastern outskirts of Terny.

On 4-5 January 2025, geolocation records indicate that Ukrainian forces retook positions in central Terny. Simultaneously, different geolocation records show that Russian troops advanced across the Zherebets River and entered central Ivanivka.

On 6 January, ISW reported that it was likely that Russian forces had captured Ivanivka and were advancing southwest of the settlement, as well as in the fields northwest of Terny.

=== Kharkiv Oblast–Luhansk Oblast border ===
On 5 August 2023, Russian forces captured the village of Novoselivske, amid Russian attacks in the northeast which were reportedly attempts to divert Ukrainian forces from the southern campaign.

On 25 August and 2 September 2023, geolocated footage showed that Russian forces recaptured tactical heights west of Kovalivka and southeast of Novoiehorivka, respectively. A few days later on 11 September 2023, there was also a small advance north of Serhiivka.

On 30 August 2024, Russia seized the village of Stelmakhivka. In early December 2024, Ukrainian sources reported that Russian forces successfully took control of the villages of Pershotravneve and Vyshneve. Simultaneously, in the southeast of Kupiansk, geolocated footage indicated that Russian forces recently advanced westward along the bridge over the Oskil River, following the P-79 Kruhlyakivka-Kupiansk highway, west of Kruhlyakivka and north of settlements along the eastern bank of the river.

On 11 December, Ukrainian forces recaptured Kopanky.

Russian milbloggers claimed on 15 December that Russian forces advanced north of Zelenyi Hai.

Russian forces advanced northward and northeastward towards Kruhlyakivka and Zahryzove on 19 December. The following day, Russian troops advanced into northern Zahryzove.

In late December, southeast of Kupiansk, Russian troops captured Lozova and Berestove and advanced along Stepova Road south of Zahryzove and east of Novoiehorivka.

By 5 January 2025, Russian forces had made progress in the fields northwest of Lozova. On 7 January, Russian forces raised their flag in Lozova, indicating that they had captured the village.

On 15 January, geolocated footage indicate that Russian forces recently advanced to the north and northwest of Vyshneve, as well as to the west of Makiivka.

On 17 January, geolocated footage indicated that Russian forces advanced east of Zeleny Hai.

On 20 January, the Russian Ministry of Defense claimed that Russian forces had seized Novoiehorivka. However, this claim was later refuted by a Ukrainian officer.

On 23 March 2025, Ukrainian forces of the 3rd Assault Brigade recaptured the village of Nadiya and about three square kilometers of surrounding territory. Andriy Biletsky, a spokesman for the Third Army Corps, stated that it had taken Russian forces two months to capture Nadiya, and that the Russian 752nd and 254th Motor Rifle Regiments have been rendered combat ineffective due to their losses in taking, and attempting to hold, Nadiya.

=== South of the Siverskyi Donets River ===
During the 2022 Kharkiv counteroffensive, on 19 September, Russian troops were forced to leave Bilohorivka, beginning heavy fighting for the village again. These gains gave Ukraine back a "foothold in the region". On 20 September 2022, Luhansk Oblast governor Serhiy Haidai reported that Russian troops had "razed [Bilohorivka] to the ground" during their failed attempts to recapture it, stating that Ukrainian forces had full control of the town.

On 18 October, Russia attempted an assault with artillery support on Bilohorivka, but the attack was repulsed. Russian troops continued to shell liberated settlements.

On 8 December, Haidai said Russia had deployed more troops near Lysychansk to capture Bilohorivka and described an intensified Russian air offensive.

Russian forces continued offensive operations at Bilohorivka on 16 January 2023. The Ukrainian General Staff reported that Ukrainian forces repulsed Russian attacks at Verkhniokamianske, Spirne, and Bilohorivka. Geolocated imagery showed that Russian forces made minor progress north of Bilohorivka.

In early February, Russian troops increased the number of attacks in the Bilohorivka area, to identify weak points in the defense of the Armed Forces of Ukraine. Ukrainian forces still maintained a presence in Bilohorivka by 7 February, despite repeated claims from Russian sources that Russia had captured the town. Russian forces made limited advances near Bilohorivka on 23 March, on 12 April, and on 22 May.

On 20 May 2024, the Russian defence ministry stated it had fully recaptured Bilohorivka. Ukraine's General Staff said their troops were still "holding back" Russian forces near the settlement.

On 23 February 2025 Russian forces captured Bilohorivka. Ukrainian officials reported the loss of the rural settlement. However, Ukrainian forces continued to maintain positions on the outskirts of Bilohorivka.

=== Kupiansk front ===
AP News reported in late February 2023 that "grueling artillery battles" had intensified in the Kupiansk area. However, in the early days of the effort, Russia only made marginal gains in the vicinity of Dvorichne (not to be confused with Dvorichna, a village in the same region).

Geolocation images released on 31 May showed that Russian troops made a small advance southeast of Masiutivka.

Between 19 and 20 June, Russian forces intensified offensive operations in the direction of Kupiansk. Russian forces made gains in the Kupiansk area on 19 June.

On 17 July, Russian forces further intensified active offensive operations, advancing into the area around Kupiansk. The ISW proposed that Russia's aims with the operation were to take advantage of Ukraine's operational focus on other sectors of the front and draw Ukrainian reserves away from critical theaters like Bakhmut, western Donetsk Oblast and western Zaporizhia Oblast, where Ukrainian forces were conducting counteroffensive operations. Russian forces deployed Storm-Z assault units formed by former members of the Wagner group and other convicts in the direction of Kupiansk. Russian forces also tried to carry out a second successful landing across the Oskil River near Masiutivka, taking new positions with the aim of completely breaking the strong Ukrainian defense line. On 17 July, Ukrainian officials stated that large contingents of Russian forces participating in the offensive were engaged in heavy fighting with Ukrainian forces in the Kupiansk area.

On 18 July, Ukrainian Deputy Defense Minister Hanna Malyar and Ukrainian Ground Forces Commander Lt. Gen. Oleksandr Syrsky reported that Russian forces continued to transfer reinforcements in the direction of Bakhmut and were concentrating their main forces in the direction of Kupiansk due to Ukrainian advances in the Bakhmut area.

On 10 August, Ukraine ordered a mandatory evacuation of 12,000 civilians from Kupiansk district, citing "the difficult security situation and the increasing amount of shelling by Russian terrorist forces."

On 7 September, units of the State Border Guard Service of Ukraine entered the settlements of Topoli and Stroivka, raising the Ukrainian flags over the settlements' administrative buildings. The settlements, close to the border with Russia, had been abandoned by Russian forces since the 2022 Kharkiv counteroffensive, but Ukrainian forces where unable to liberate the settlements due to Russian artillery control over the region leaving them in a "grey-zone" as neither side controlled them.

After having failed to breach through the Kotliarivka/Kyslivka/Ivanivka and then Synkivka axes, Russia switched offensive directions and reactivated the Svatove sector. On 18 January 2024, Russian forces managed to advance in the forest area east of Tabaivka and the next day a prominent Russian source reported that Russian troops had advanced up to half a kilometer west of the railway in the direction of Krokhmalne as well. On 20 January, Krokhmalne was recaptured and, on the following two days, several Russian sources said that Russian troops advanced southwest of the village and reached the outskirts of Berestove. A Russian journalist further said that Russian forces recently recaptured sections of the P07 highway, including near Novoselivske. He also reported that the frontline had been leveled along the highway up to the southern outskirts of Kotliarivka.

By 27 January, it was confirmed that Russian troops had advanced west of Synkivka.

On 27 January, Russian sources claimed that the small rural settlement of Tabaivka had been captured (except for the southern outskirts) by elements of the 47th Tank Division. The settlement lies in a lowland exposed to hills east of the P07 highway, which would have facilitated an attack.

The next day, they also claimed that Russian forces were moving southwest towards Pishchane, advanced in Berestove, further south, and possibly captured Kotliarivka, immediately northeast. On 1 February, geolocated footage confirmed the Russians had at least stabilized the front along the P07 highway and some Russian sources further claimed that Russian troops had entered Ivanivka and were advancing south towards Kyslivka.

In early June, geolocated footage indicated that Russian forces had likely captured the village of Ivanivka in Kharkiv Oblast.

On 20 July, Russia was confirmed to have recaptured Pishchane in eastern Kharkiv Oblast.

On 29 August, footage showed that Russia had made advances in central Synkivka, with some sources saying the village had been captured.

By 6 September, Russian forces had completely seized Synkivka, while Russian sources claimed further advances west of Pishchane. Further advances south in the week after the capture of Synkivka were made, with Russian forces advancing into northern Petropavlivka.

On 14 November, two Russian armoured vehicle columns advanced into Kupiansk from the northeast, though reportedly had tenuous control over the area. Russian forces made further progress into the city the following day, with fighting reportedly ongoing in the industrial area, and were reportedly setting up supply lines to assist in further offensive efforts.

At the end of November, a Ukrainian official confirmed that Russian forces recently crossed to the western bank of the Oskil River near the suspension bridge south of Novomlynsk. The General Staff of Ukraine acknowledged that Russian forces carried out attacks on the western bank near Fyholivka, Holubivka, and Kindrashivka. Russian sources claimed that Russian forces established a foothold on the western bank near Dvorichna.

In early December, Russian forces once again crossed the Oskil River south of Dvorichna and established a second bridgehead. Ukrainian officials reported that the Ukrainian armed forces successfully prevented Russia from building a bridgehead on the west bank of the Oskil River and recaptured the village of Novomlynsk.

Russian milbloggers claimed on 15 December that Russian forces seized Dvorichna (north of Kupiansk); advanced south of Dvorichna along the western (right) bank of the Oskil River; and advanced on the western bank of the Oskil River. On 19 December, Ukrainian military observer Kostyantyn Mashovets stated that Ukrainian forces appeared to have retreated westward to the P-79 highway towards Dvorichna. Geolocated records indicated that Russian forces advanced slightly southeast of Dvorichna on 22 December.

At the end of December, Russian milbloggers reported that Russian forces had withdrawn from the northeastern outskirts of Kupiansk to fortified positions near Petropavlivka some time ago, as Ukrainian unmanned aerial vehicles disrupted Russian ground lines of communication.

On 8 January 2025, Ukrainian military observer Kostyantyn Mashovets stated that Russian forces had advanced slightly to the south of Dvorichna and that Russian troops were advancing along the Dvorichna-Kupiansk highway toward Zapadne.

On 12 January, the Russian Ministry of Defense claimed that Russian forces had seized Kalynove. The following day, Ukrainian military observers reported that Russian forces had significantly expanded their bridgehead along the Oskil River near Dvorichna, maintained positions in half of Dvorichna, and were potentially attempting to advance along the P-79 Dvorichna-Kupiansk road toward Kindrashivka.

The Ukrainian General Staff acknowledged that Russian forces had attacked near Stroivka on 19 January.

The Russian Ministry of Defense claimed on 22 January that Russian forces had seized Zapadne. On the same day, Russian military bloggers claimed that Russian troops advanced to the north and south of Zapadne, as well as to the south and center of Dvorichna. On 28 January, the Russian defense ministry said that the town of Dvorichna had been fully recaptured by its forces.

== Casualties and losses ==
In sporadic casualty updates between November 2022 and October 2023, the Ukrainians had claimed that 3,729 Russian soldiers have been killed, at least 2,633 wounded, and at least 53 captured. Ukraine has also claimed the destruction of 54 Russian T-80 and T-90 tanks, as well as 7 T-72 tanks. Ukraine has also claimed to have destroyed two 2S4 Tyulpans, and captured 3 T-72B3 tanks.

On the night of 2 November, Ukrainian sources claimed to have destroyed an entire Russian battalion near the town of Makiivka, in Svatove Raion. According to a Russian survivor of the attack, out of the 570 soldiers in his unit, 29 survived, 12 were wounded, while the other 529 men had been killed. Furthermore, some Russian sources claimed that the unit to which the battalion belonged, the 362nd Motorized Rifle Regiment, lost 2,500 men killed (or over half its strength) in just 12 days at a position near Svatove, and only had 100 men left to man the defense line. The same source also claimed that 300 Russian wounded who attempted to crawl back to their positions were treated as deserters, although neither of these reports could be independently verified at the time. Meanwhile, on 7 November, 21 Russian soldiers from the 346th Motorized Rifle Regiment surrendered en masse to the Ukrainians near Svatove.

On 18 November, video emerged of what appeared to be at least ten Russian soldiers surrendering to Ukrainian soldiers in the town of Makiivka, then being killed by the Ukrainians after another Russian suddenly emerges from cover opens fire on the Ukrainians. Ukraine claims that the Russian soldiers had committed an act of intentional perfidy firing at them while surrendering, but the Russians deny this, and claim that "the execution of at least 11 unarmed Russian servicemen" had occurred.

On 15 January 2023, the Ukrainians reported that as of the 12th, a battalion from the Russian 26th Tank Regiment had been reduced to just 30 men and 10 tanks, down from an established strength of 40 T-80BV tanks and 120 tank crewmen.

On 9 February 2023, Ukrainian officials claimed they had destroyed a Russian BMPT Terminator in the Luhansk front, posting pictures online of what appeared to be the destroyed Russian vehicle. If true, this would be the first known loss of such vehicle in the war.

On 24 March, the Ukrainians claimed to have killed or wounded 183 Russian soldiers and to have taken two prisoners in fighting east of Kupiansk and Lyman. They also claimed to have destroyed 10 T-80 and T-90 tanks over the course of the previous week. Furthermore, on 26 March, they claimed that 100 Russian soldiers had been killed and taken to a morgue in Troitske, a town in Svatove Raion. Another 140 seriously injured were taken to hospitals for medical treatment. By 5 April, the Ukrainians claimed to have destroyed another 10 T-90 tanks during the fighting.

On 17 April, the Ukrainian General Staff claimed that 14 Russian trucks transporting seriously wounded soldiers back to Russian territory were denied entry and turned back, with some of the men dying as a result. The remaining 50 of them were later taken to Troitske Central District Hospital in Luhansk Oblast.

On 8 May, the Ukrainians claimed to have destroyed two Russian tanks, one a T-80 and the other a T-90, during fighting in Luhansk Oblast. They also claimed to have killed 50 Russian soldiers and wounded another 96.

On 5 October 2023, Russia conducted a missile attack against civilians in the village Hroza near Kupiansk, killing over 50 civilians.

On 23 October 2023, the Ukrainians claimed to have repelled 20 Russian attacks in the Lyman–Kupiansk sector, "eliminating" 263 Russian servicemen and 23 units of equipment.

In November 2023, the fighting reportedly escalated, with the Ukrainians claiming that the Russians lost 11,000 men killed during just the past month, with 1,100 pieces of equipment destroyed, including 130 tanks, 208 IFVs and 260 artillery systems and mortars. 1,826 soldiers and 200 pieces of equipment (including 22 tanks and 54 armored vehicles) lost just between 1 and 6 November. During the first half of December alone, they claimed Russia had lost another 8,000 troops in Luhansk, as well as 500 pieces of equipment, including 67 tanks, 100 armored vehicles and 77 artillery pieces. By 27 December, the Ukrainians again claimed heavy losses for their enemy, with Russia allegedly suffering more than 3,000 casualties, including over a thousand dead, during just the past week. They also claimed to have taken out 361 pieces of military equipment, including 43 tanks, 83 armored combat vehicles, and 69 artillery pieces.

On 20 January 2024, the Ukrainians claimed to have killed or wounded 7,055 to 7,500 Russian soldiers since the beginning of the year (compared with 14,000 losses in December 2023), and to have destroyed 931 pieces of equipment, including 120 tanks, 218 armored vehicles and 178 artillery systems and mortars within the same period.

On 15 February 2024, Ukrainian forces claimed to have destroyed a battalion-sized Russian assault group from the 3rd Army Corps near the village of Terny, with the loss of four T-90M and two T-80 tanks, plus four IFVs and a TOS-1 thermobaric rocket-launcher.

On 7 March 2024, the Ukrainians published an intercepted phone call from a Russian soldier, who claimed that the Kremlin was sending prisoners and the disabled to fight, and that 600 of them had been killed in "one-and-a-half months of the assault".

On 7 April, the Ukrainian Azov Brigade published a video in which they ambushed a Russian convoy near Terny. They claimed to have killed 50 Russians, destroyed 11 pieces of equipment, and captured a "new" T-72B3M tank.

On 1 May, the Ukrainians struck a Russian military training ground about 80 kilometers behind the frontline in Luhansk Oblast, southwest of Mozhnyakivka, with four ATACMS. 116 Russian personnel were reportedly killed in the strike.

On 14 June, a large concentration of Russian troops from the 20th Army were awaiting a speech from Major General Sukhrab Akhmedov behind the front line in Luhansk Oblast when the gathering was attacked by Ukrainian M142 HIMARS strikes. Reports from both Ukrainian and Russian sources state that 100 Russian troops died, and a further 100 were wounded.

On 1 October 2024, the Ukrainians reportedly defeated a battalion-sized Russian force near Kupyansk, which had launched a two-pronged assault to reach the Oskil. In just 20 minutes, they claimed to have destroyed 18 MBTs and 37 AFVs, with 1,000 men claimed killed, wounded or missing.

On 25 November 2024, Major Anastasiya Bobovnikova, spokesperson for Ukraine's Luhansk Group of Forces, claimed that Russia suffered 15,000 losses ("roughly 1.5 divisions' worth of infantry") in the Siversk direction during an unspecified timeframe. Independent news site Astra reported on 18 November that these losses were from the 3rd Combined Arms Army, and had lost 1,410 men assaulting Bilohorivka over the course of ten days. They also claimed that the commander of the 123rd Motorized Rifle Brigade was removed following an assault where 200 infantrymen had gone missing and 100 tank crewmen had been killed or wounded on 2 November.

On 6 December 2024, the Ukrainians claimed to have repulsed three Russian mechanized assaults with 100 lightly armored vehicles near Kupyansk, 90 percent of which were destroyed.

On 14 December 2024, elements of three Ukrainian brigades repulsed a battalion-sized Russian assault on Siversk, who claimed to destroyed 15 armored vehicles and tanks, 40 motorcycles and to have killed or injured 400 personnel.

On 24 December 2024, a Ukrainian battalion commander claimed that his forces had repelled three Russian mechanized assaults near Kupyansk since 17 December, and had destroyed 37 armored vehicles, or about 85 percent of the armored vehicles Russian forces had used.

On 7 January 2025, a Ukrainian battalion commander claimed that Russian forces lost almost 100 armored vehicles and suffered "significant casualties" during recent attempts to enter Kruhlyakivka (northeast of Borova).

On 7 February 2025, the Ukrainians claimed that Russian forces had suffered over 1,000 casualties during recent assaults against Terny.

According to an analyst by DeepState, estimated Russian casualties fighting in Bilohorivka between April 2024 and February 2025 were 3,013, including 1,543 killed, 1,455 wounded and 15 captured.

== See also ==
- List of military engagements during the Russian invasion of Ukraine
