= Northeastern Ukraine campaign =

Northeastern Ukraine campaign may refer to:

- 2022 Kharkiv counteroffensive
- Luhansk Oblast campaign
- Northern Kharkiv front of the Russo-Ukrainian War

== See also ==
- Eastern front of the Russian invasion of Ukraine
- Northern front of the Russian invasion of Ukraine
