= Kreminna urban hromada =

Kreminna urban hromada Кремінська міська громада
- Hromada
- Interactive map of Kreminna urban hromada
- Country: Ukraine
- Oblast: Luhansk
- Raion: Sievierodonetsk

Area
  - Total: 532.9 km^{2} (205.8 sq mi)

Population (2020)
  - Total: 21,968
  - Density: 41.22/km^{2} (106.8/sq mi)
- Settlements: 11
- Cities: 1
- Rural settlements: 4
- Villages: 6

Kreminna urban hromada (Ukrainian: Кремінська міська громада) is a hromada of Ukraine, located in Sievierodonetsk Raion, Luhansk Oblast. Its administrative center is the city Kreminna.

It has an area of 532.9 square kilometres (205.8 mi^{2}) and a population of 21,968, as of 2020.

The hromada contains 11 settlements: 1 city (Kreminna), 6 villages:

- Holikove
- Novokrasnianka
- Pishchane
- Pshenchne
- Surovtsivka
- Chervonopopivka

And 4 rural-type settlements: Dibrova, Zhitlivka, Kuzmine, Stara Krasnianka.

== See also ==
- List of hromadas of Ukraine
