= Novoselivske (village) =

Novoselivske is an urban-type settlement in Crimea, Ukraine.

Novoselivske may also refer to:

- Novoselivske, a village in Dnipropetrovsk Oblast, Ukraine
- Novoselivske, Luhansk Oblast, a village in Luhansk Oblast, Ukraine
