= 423rd Guards Yampolsky Motor Rifle Regiment =

423rd Guards, Order of Suvorov 2nd class and Order of Kutuzov 2nd class, Yampolsky Motor Rifle Regiment
- 423-й гвардейский мотострелковый Ямпольский Краснознамённый, орденов Суворова и Кутузова полк
- Sleeve patch of the 423rd Guards MR Regiment
- Active: 1942–2009; 2013–present
- Country: Russia
- Branch: Russian Ground Forces
- Type: Mechanized infantry
- Size: Regiment
- Part of: 4th Guards Tank Division
- Garrison/HQ: Naro-Fominsk, 70km south-west of Moscow.
- Nickname: Yampolsky
- Mottos: "Duty and honour"
- Engagements: World War II; Second Chechen War Russo–Ukrainian War: Northern front; Russian invasion of Sumy Oblast; Eastern front; 2022 Kharkiv counteroffensive; Kharkiv Oblast–Luhansk Oblast border front
- Decorations: Order of Suvorov 2nd Class; Order of Kutuzov 2nd Class
- Honorifics: Yampol

The 423rd Guards Yampolsky Motor Rifle Regiment (Note: (Russian: 423-й гвардейский мотострелковый Ямпольский Краснознамённый, орденов Суворова и Кутузова полк, romanized: 423-y gvardeyskiy motostrelkovyy Yampol'skiy Krasnoznamonnyy, ordenov Suvorova i Kutuzova polk), military unit number 91701) is a regiment of the Soviet Army and Russian Ground Forces. For most of the post-war period, it has been a part of the 4th Guards Tank Division.

== History ==
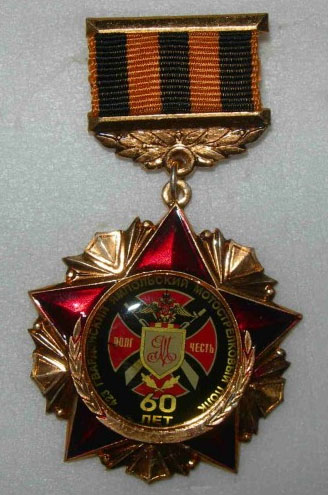
Medal of 60 years to The Yampolsky regiment

The 31st Motorised Brigade was formed in June 1942 under the 17th Tank Corps. On 2 January 1943, the brigade was renamed as the 3rd Guards Yampolsky Motor Rifle of Suvorov and Kutuzov.

Within three years of participation in the German-Soviet War, the brigade fought from the Don to Elbe rivers, from the city of Voronezh to the walls of Prague, inflicting heavy damage against enemy forces. For their actions, 19 members of the brigade received distinctions as Hero of Soviet Union.

Since 11 September 1945, the place of permanent deployment of the regiment has been Naro-Fominsk, Moscow Region.

On 5 May 1957 the regiment was renamed as the 423rd Guards Yampolsky Motor Rifle of Suvorov and Kutuzov's awards of II degree a regiment. The regiment has grown up 12 commanders of divisions, 2 deputy ministers of defence.

Since 11 September 1999 - 28 March 2000 The regimental tactical group 423rd regiment carried out a problem on constitutional order prompting in territory to the Chechen republic.

The regiment participated in the assault of the city of Grozny, the battle for the village of Komsomolskoye. The regiment lost 27 people.

In 2000, 2001, 2002 the regiment admitted the best regiment in Moscow Military District.

On 21 June the part celebrates an annual holiday of formation of a regiment. The regiment was disbanded in April 2009 when the division became a brigade.

Two members of the regiment were captured by Ukraine's 93rd Mechanized Brigade on the first day of the Russian invasion of Ukraine. On 1 March, soldiers from the regiment were captured in the village of Hrun, near Okhtyrka, Sumy Oblast.

On 10 September 2022, during a Ukrainian counteroffensive in the Kharkiv Oblast, members of the regiment were taken prisoner in the village of Topolske, south of Izium, by Ukraine's Carpathian Sich Battalion.

In December 2022, the regiment was reportedly deployed to the Luhansk Oblast front. In June 2024, Russian sources reported that the unit had engaged in combat within the Luhansk Oblast village of Stelmakhivka. By December 2024, the 423rd Regiment had reportedly reached Zelenyi Hai of Kharkiv Oblast.

== Last structure ==
As of 2007, the Yampolsky Regiment consisted of the following units:

- 1st Motorised Battalion, Naro-Fominsk
- 2nd Motorised Battalion, Naro-Fominsk
- 3rd Motorised Battalion, Naro-Fominsk
- Independent Military Intelligence Company, Naro-Fominsk
- Independent Signal Company, Naro-Fominsk
- Support Company, Naro-Fominsk
- Engineer Company, Naro-Fominsk
- Tank Company, Naro-Fominsk
- Artillery Battalion, Naro-Fominsk
- Artillery Battalion, Naro-Fominsk
- Air Defence Battalion, Naro-Fominsk

== Personnel and equipment ==
The 423rd Guards Yampolsky Motor Rifle Regiment had approximately 1692 personnel in active service.

Equipment Summary

- BMP-2 — 85
- BRM-1K — 5
- BTR-80 — 6
- 2S3 Akatsiya — 27
- MTLB- 3
- BMP-1KSh-8
- T-80- 17
