= Kolomyichykha rural hromada =

Kolomyichykha rural hromada Коломийчиська сільська громада
- Hromada
- Interactive map of Kolomyichykha rural hromada
- Country: Ukraine
- Oblast: Luhansk
- Raion: Svatove

Area
  - Total: 390.6 km^{2} (150.8 sq mi)

Population (2020)
  - Total: 3,211
  - Density: 8.221/km^{2} (21.29/sq mi)
- Settlements: 21
- Villages: 21

Kolomyichykha rural hromada (Ukrainian: Коломийчиська сільська громада) is a hromada of Ukraine, located in Svatove Raion, Luhansk Oblast. Its administrative center is the village of Kolomyichykha.

It has an area of 390.6 square kilometres (150.8 mi^{2}) and a population of 3,211, as of 2020.

The hromada contains 21 settlements, which are all villages:

- Andriivka
- Volodymyrivka
- Dzherelne
- Karmazynivka
- Kovalivka
- Kolomyichykha
- Kryvoshiivka
- Kuzemivka
- Myasozharivka
- Nadiia
- Nezhuryne
- Novoiehorivka
- Novoiehorivka
- Novoselivske
- Patalakhivka
- Pidkuychansk
- Popivka
- Raihorodka
- Serhiivka
- Stelmakhivka
- Storozhivka

== See also ==
- List of hromadas of Ukraine
