= 2nd Guards Motor Rifle Brigade =

Kyrgyz military unit

2nd Guards Motor Rifle Frunze Brigade
- 2-я отдельная гвардейская мотострелковая Краснознамённая бригада им. М. В. Фрунзе
- Active: 18 March 1918 – present
- Country: Soviet Union (1918–1992); Kyrgyzstan (since 1992)
- Branch: Soviet Army; Kyrgyz Army
- Type: Motor rifle
- Role: Urban warfare
- Size: Brigade (2,000)
- Part of: Northern Group of Forces
- Garrison/HQ: Koy-Tash
- Nickname(s): Frunze Guards
- Anniversaries: 18 March
- Engagements: Russian Civil War; Soviet–Japanese Border Wars; World War II

Commanders
- Notable commanders: Major General Alexei Kosyakov (1985–1987)

The 2nd Guards Motor Rifle Frunze Brigade (Kyrgyz: 2-гвардиялык мотоаткычтар бригадасы; Russian: 2-я отдельная гвардейская мотострелковая Краснознамённая бригада им. М. В. Фрунзе), Military Unit No. 73809, is a Kyrgyz military unit in the Ground Forces based in the city of Koy-Tash.

== History ==
=== Early Soviet era and war years ===
The 1st Peasant Soviet Regiment was one of the first military units to be formed in the Red Army, being formed in 1918, in Gomel, a city in what is now Belarus. The first fighters were from the Gomel and Starodub partisan detachments. It first saw action during the Russian Civil War during which it fought against foreign occupation and anti-Soviet forces. It was labelled the 241st Peasant Regiment immediately after those battles. For its service in the battles of Minsk, Baranavichy, Rodimin, it was awarded the Order of the Red Banner. On 9 June 1922, the regiment was renamed the 94th Peasant Rifle Regiment, and in recognition of its service it received the honorific Mikhail Frunze in 1927. In the 30s, the regiment took part in combat operations against the Imperial Japanese Army on Lake Khasan during the Soviet–Japanese border conflicts of the decade. In September 1939, the regiment was given the conventional name of the 17th Rifle Regiment.

=== War years ===
During the Great Patriotic War, the unit was deployed to operations in Belarus and the Baltic States. In 1941, near Naro-Fominsk, the infantrymen restrained the German Wehrmacht offensive for four days, after which they launched a counterattack. In 1942 it received the honorary title of Guards, becoming 87th Guards Red Banner Rifle Regiment, and the division in which it was serving became the 29th Guards Rifle Division. During the war, it notably took part in the Battles of Rzhev. It included four Heroes of the Soviet Union, and over two hundred order bearers. The regiment's combat service, often referred to in Russian sources as its 'combat path,' or 'fighting way,' ended while serving in Estonia. Its last battle was fought near the town of Tsipkuri under the command of regimental commander, Hero of the Soviet Union, Colonel Ivan Tretyak.

=== Post-war ===
After the war, it had been renamed to the 113th Guards Mechanized Regiment (effective June 1946) and the 282nd Guards Red Banner Motor Rifle Regiment named after Frunze (effective 30 April 1957), both of which under the 36th Guards Motor Rifle Division. The regiment held the title of best in the Soviet Army for more than two decades and was awarded the Pennant of the Minister of Defense of the Soviet Union "For courage and military valor". Later the 282nd Guards Motor Rifle Regiment received a "permanent residence permit" in Kirghizia in 1967 after being relocated to the republic from the city of Rakvere in the Estonian SSR. Organizationally, it became part of the 8th Guards Motor Rifle Panfilov Division with a deployment in the village of Koy-Tash near Frunze.

=== Independence ===
In May 1992, like many other military units deployed on the territory of the former Soviet republic, the regiment was included in the ranks of the Armed Forces of the Kyrgyz Republic. On 8 December 1997, it was transformed into the 1st Koy-Tash Motorized Rifle brigade. In November 2012, by order of Ministry of Defense Major General Taalaibek Omuraliev, it was given its current name Members of the brigade took part in the quelling of the Batken Conflict in 1999, with 25 of its fighters being killed in action. Units of the brigade are part of the Collective Rapid Reaction Force of the Collective Security Treaty Organization. An anniversary pennant was handed over to personnel of the brigade on its 95th anniversary, during a ceremony held on Poklonnaya Hill in Moscow. On its centennial in 2018, it received greetings from President of Kyrgyzstan Sooronbay Jeenbekov, who described the unit as one that "continues to maintain and increase its glorious path". Previously, meetings of veterans of the regiment were held in 2008 and 2013.

== See also ==
- Central Asian Military District
