= 63rd Mechanized Brigade =

Ukrainian Ground Forces unit

63rd Mechanized "Lyman" Brigade
- 63-тя окрема механізована Лиманська бригада
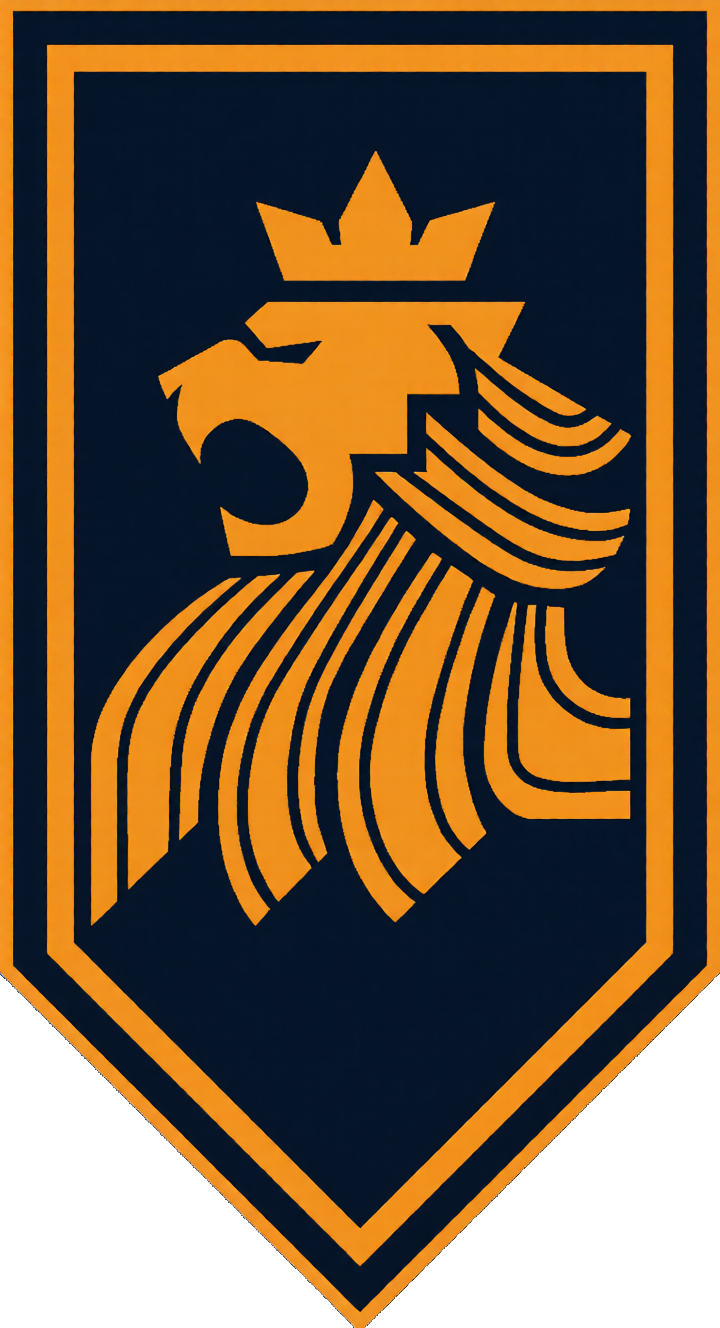
- Shoulder Sleeve Insignia
- Active: July 23, 2017 – present
- Country: Ukraine
- Branch: Ukrainian Ground Forces
- Role: Mechanized Infantry
- Size: Brigade
- Part of: 3rd Army Corps
- Garrison/HQ: Starokostyantyniv, Khmelnytskyi Oblast
- Engagements: Russian invasion of Ukraine: 2022 Kherson counteroffensive; Battle of Bakhmut
- Website: https://www.facebook.com/63ombr

Commanders
- Current commander: Pavlo Yurchuk

Insignia
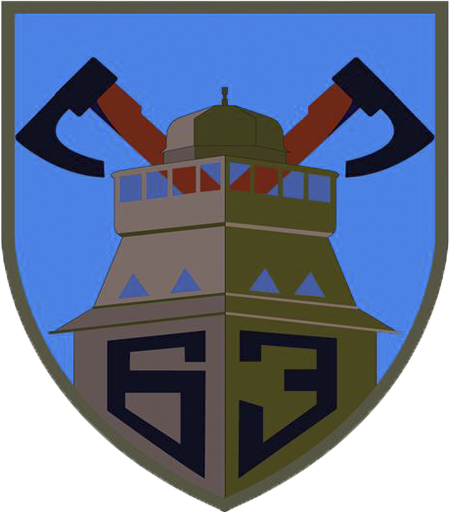
- Old unit patch

- Old patch

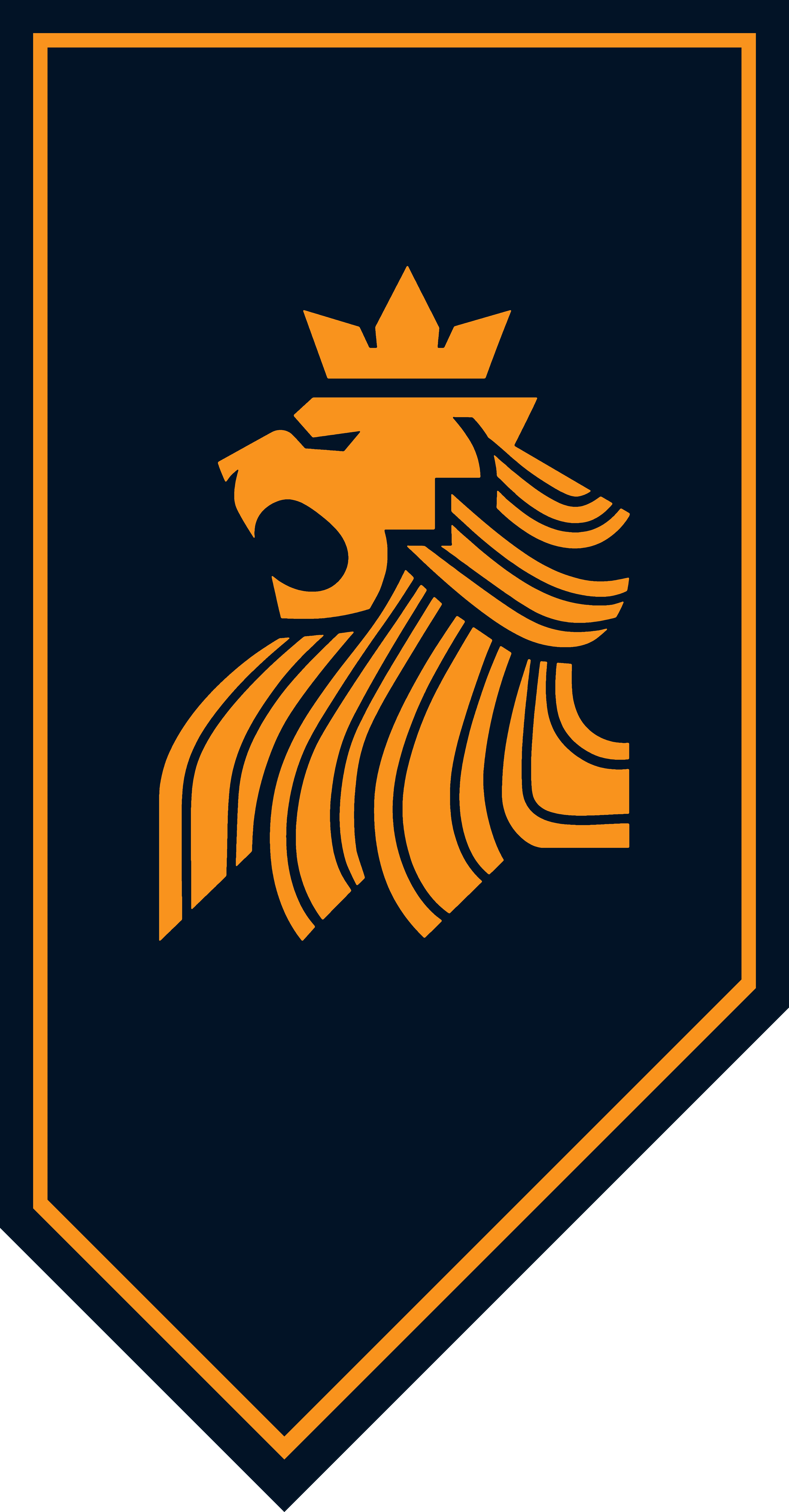
- Flag

The 63rd Mechanized "Lyman" Brigade (Ukrainian: 63-тя окрема механізована Лиманська бригада) is a brigade of the Ukrainian Ground Forces formed in 2017.

== History ==
In October 2017, the brigade arrived in the ATO zone. The brigade participated in the strategic command and staff exercise "Cossack Will" once more in September 2019 as the main unit, which was utilized during the practical phase. The fact that the units were outfitted with their own weapons and military hardware marked a significant departure from 2017. The staff demonstrated high skill, tenacity, and the capacity to successfully complete tasks as assigned. The brigade received high praise from both the exercise leadership and the command of the Ground Forces of the Ukrainian Armed Forces, according to the exercise results.

During the Russian invasion of Ukraine, starting in April, the brigade fought in the Kherson-Mykolaiv direction, taking part in battles for the right bank of the Dnieper. In November 2022, it took part in the liberation of Kherson. From December 15, 2022, the brigade was transferred to Bakhmut.

By January 2024, the brigade was operating in the Luhansk Oblast near the village of Dibrova. In March 2024, the brigade's units took part in an operation to target Russian positions west of Kreminna in the Luhansk Oblast.

== Structure ==
As of 2024, the brigade's structure is as follows:

- 63rd Mechanized Brigade
  - Headquarters & Headquarters Company
  - 1st Mechanized Battalion
  - 2nd Mechanized Battalion
  - 3rd Mechanized Battalion
  - 23rd Rifle Infantry Battalion
    - UAV Unit "Promin"
  - 51st Separate Rifle Battalion
  - 52nd Separate Rifle Battalion
  - 55th Separate Rifle Battalion
  - Tank Battalion
  - Field Artillery Regiment
    - Headquarters and Target Acquisition Battery
    - Self-Propelled Artillery Battalion
    - 36th Howitzer Self-Propelled Artillery Battalion
    - 41st Howitzer Self-Propelled Artillery Battalion
    - Rocket Artillery Division
    - Anti-Tank Artillery Division
  - Anti-Aircraft Defense Battalion
  - Reconnaissance Company
  - Aerial Reconnaissance Unit "Smiley"
  - Unmanned Systems Battalion "Moon Planet"
  - Engineer Battalion
  - Logistic Battalion
  - Signal Company
  - Maintenance Battalion
  - Radar Company
  - Medical Company
  - Chemical, Biological, Radiological and Nuclear Defense Company
  - 105th Separate Mechanized Battalion
  - 106th Separate Mechanized Battalion
  - 107th Separate Mechanized Battalion
  - Unmanned Systems Battalion
  - Anti-aircraft missile and artillery division
  - Combat and logistical support units
