= Serhiivka, Luhansk Oblast =

Serhiivka Сергіївка Сергеевка (Russian)
- Village
- Location within Luhansk Oblast Location within Ukraine
- Coordinates: 49°21′41″N 37°57′30″E
- Country: Ukraine
- Oblast: Luhansk Oblast
- Raion: Svatove Raion
- Hromada: Kolomyichykha rural hromada

Population (2001)
  - Total: 20
- Time zone: UTC+2 (EET)
  - Summer (DST): UTC+3 (EEST)

Serhiivka (Ukrainian: Сергіївка; Russian: Сергеевка) is a village in Svatove Raion in Luhansk Oblast, in eastern Ukraine. In 2001, it had population of 20 people.

== History ==
It was occupied by Russian forces during the Russian invasion of Ukraine. Ukrainian forces liberated it on 26 October 2022.
