= 144th Guards Motor Rifle Division =

Active Russian Ground Forces formation

- Shoulder Sleeve Patch
- Active: 1922–2004; 2016–present
- Country: Soviet Union; Russia
- Branch: Red Army (1922–1946); Soviet Army (1946–1991); Russian Ground Forces (1991–present)
- Type: Mechanized infantry
- Size: Division
- Part of: 20th Combined Arms Army; Moscow Military District
- Garrison/HQ: Yelnya; MUN 23060
- Nickname: Yelnya
- Engagements: World War II; Battle of Moscow; Riga offensive (1944); Russo-Ukrainian War; Kyiv offensive; 2022 Ukrainian Kharkiv counteroffensive; Battle of Bakhmut; Battle of the Svatove–Kreminna line; 2023 Ukrainian counteroffensive; 2024 Kursk offensive
- Decorations: Order of the Red Banner; Order of Suvorov, 2nd class
- Battle honours: Guards

Commanders
- Current commander: Colonel Aleksey Alekseyevich Polyakov

The 144th Guards Yelnya Red Banner Order of Suvorov Motor Rifle Division (Russian: 144-я гвардейская мотострелковая Ельнинская Краснознамённая, ордена Суворова дивизия) is a motorized infantry division of the Russian Ground Forces, reestablished in 2016 with its headquarters at Yelnya, Smolensk Oblast.

== History ==
=== Formation & World War II ===
The division traces its lineage back to the 32nd Rifle Division (First formation) of the Soviet Union's Red Army, first formed in 1922 and converted into the 29th Guards Rifle Division in 1942 for its actions in the Battle of Moscow during World War II.

The 32nd Division's part in the battle of Moscow did not escape the notice of the Soviet high command and it was given the title 29th Guards Rifle Division and the 17th Rifle Regiment received the Order of the Red Banner. Its regiments were given new Guards unit numberings as the 87th, 90th, and 93rd Guards Rifle Regiments. In October 1944 it was moved to the Baltic area and was the first Soviet division into Riga. It ended the war as part of 10th Guards Army still in the Baltic region.

=== Cold War ===
Postwar, it was stationed in the Estonian SSR and redesignated as the 36th Guards Mechanized Division in 1946 and the 36th Guards Motor Rifle Division in 1957. Three years later, on 23 June 1960, the division was disbanded by being renamed the 8th Guards Rezhitskaya Order of Lenin Red Banner order of Suvorov Motorised Rifle Division "Major-General I.V. Panfilov". To perpetuate the lineage of the disbanded division, the 36th Guards was redesignated and adopted its history. By this time, the 87th Guards Rifle Regiment had become the 282nd Guards Motor Rifle Regiment. When the 8th Guards Motor Rifle Division was transferred to Central Asia in 1967, it was dispatched to Kyrgyzstan with the division, and, many years later, eventually after the dissolution of the Soviet Union became a Kyrgyz motor rifle brigade.

On 18 February 1967, the 144th Guards Motor Rifle Division was formed in Tallinn, Estonian SSR, Baltic Military District, replacing the 8th Guards Motor Rifle Division, which was about to transfer to Frunze, Kyrgyz SSR. Ten months later, on 23 December 1967, the division was given the traditions, honors and awards of the 36th Guards Motor Rifle Division, which had been disbanded in 1960. It was therefore renamed the 144th Guards Motor Rifle Division.

Holm 2015 and Feskov et al. 2013 list the regiments of the division in 1970 as follows:

- 254th Guards Motor Rifle Regiment (Tallinn, Estonian SSR) - from the 8th Guards Motor Rifle Division
- 482nd Motor Rifle Regiment (Klooga, Estonian SSR)
- 488th Motor Rifle Regiment (Klooga, Estonian SSR)
- 228th Tank Regiment (Keila, Estonian SSR)
- 450th Artillery Regiment (Klooga, Estonian SSR)
- 1259th Anti-Aircraft Artillery Regiment (Klooga, Estonian SSR)

Holm writes that the division was maintained as a Not Ready Division - Cadre Low Strength (US terms: Category III) - manning was 15% (2000 men).

== Russian Ground Forces service ==
After the withdrawal of Soviet troops from the Baltics following the dissolution of the Soviet Union, the division became part of the Russian Ground Forces and was sent to Yelnya, Yelninsky District, Smolensk Oblast in the Moscow Military District and was reorganised as the 4944th Base for Storage of Weapons and Equipment in 1993. It was planned that in a crisis it would be capable of being brought back to up to full division strength. The 4944th Guards Weapons and Equipment Storage Base was disbanded in 2004.

As part of a Russian military buildup in the mid-2010s, the division was reformed as the 144th Motor Rifle Division in 2016 at Yelnya as part of the 20th Guards Army, and redesignated as the 144th Guards Motor Rifle Division to become the official successor of the previous formation of the same name in 2018. By a decree of Russian President Vladimir Putin on 30 June 2018, it inherited the lineage of the 29th Guards Rifle Division and its successors.

=== Russo-Ukrainian War ===
==== Russian invasion of Ukraine ====
When, on 24 February 2022, Russia invaded Ukraine, the unit was deployed as part of the grouping detailed to capture Ukraine's capital Kyiv by invading Ukraine from neighboring Belarus. The unit reportedly suffered heavy losses in the Kyiv campaign, and early April 2022 the campaign was disbanded altogether by Russia. The unit retreated across the Russian and Belarusian borders and was reinforced in order to return to the front.

The 488th Motor Rifle Regiment attacked Kharkiv Oblast on 5 March 2022. By July, the unit received the honorific 'Guards' status.

In the September 2022 Ukrainian Kharkiv counteroffensive the unit again suffered heavy losses. The surviving members of the unit failed their objective to stop the Ukrainian army from crossing the Oskil river. It was reported on 23 September that the commander of the 144th division, Colonel Aleksey Alekseyevich Polyakov was wounded and evacuated in Svatove. Polyakov returned to division command by January 2023.

On 26 September 2022, the 144th Guards Motor Rifle Division, which had a prewar strength of over 12,000 troops, had been reported to have been largely destroyed and rendered combat ineffective as a result of heavy casualties sustained during the Kharkiv counteroffensive and the battle of Bakhmut.

The 283rd Motor Rifle Regiment was added to the order of battle in 2023.

In August 2024 during the 2024 Kursk offensive, The Security Service of Ukraine reported that over 100 soldiers from the 488th Guards Motorized Rifle Regiment surrendered at a large defensive complex.

According to the Institute for the Study of War, the 144th Guards Motor Rifle Division had been active on the Lyman front from at least 2023 until early 2025 without having been withdrawn for rest or reconstitution at any point. It was reported in March 2025 that the division's 254th Motor Rifle Regiment had suffered losses in combat against Ukraine's 3rd Assault Brigade near the village of Nadiia in the Luhansk Oblast. After the success of Operation Vivaldi in 2026 Ukrainian forces claim, that the 144th Division "ceased to operate as an organized military force".

== Composition ==
Structure in 2024

- Headquarters (Yelnya, Yelninsky District, Smolensk Oblast)
  - 673rd separate anti-aircraft missile division (Smolensk);
  - 148th separate reconnaissance battalion, military unit 23872 (Smolensk);
  - 1259th separate anti-tank artillery Battalion (Yelnya);
  - 340th Separate Engineer Battalion (Yelnya);
  - 686th Separate Communications Battalion (Shatlovo);
  - 1032nd Separate Logistics Battalion (Pochep);
  - 150th Separate Medical Battalion (Pochep);
  - Separate UAV Company;
  - Separate Electronic Warfare Company;
  - Separate NBC Protection Company.
- 182nd Motor Rifle Regiment (Zaymishche, Klintsy, Bryansk Oblast);
- 254th Guards Motor Rifle Regiment named for "Alexander Matrosov" V/Ch 91704 (Zaymishche, Klintsy, Bryansk Oblast);
- 283rd Motor Rifle Regiment (Yelnya);
- 488th Guards Motor Rifle Regiment - "Simferopol Red Banner, Order of Suvorov named for Sergo Ordzhonikidze," V/Ch 12721 (Klintsy);
- 59th Guards Tank Lublin Twice Red Banner, Order of Suvorov and Kutuzov Regiment (Yelnya);
- 856th Guards Self-Propelled Artillery Regiment - "Kobrin Red Banner, Order of Bogdan Khmelnitsky"; V/Ch 23857 (Pochep, Bryansk Oblast.) The Order of Bogdan Khmelnitsky was awarded in July 1945.

== Commanders ==
- Major General Vladimir Vitalyevich Sleptsov ?- 2022
- Colonel Aleksey Alekseyevich Polyakov (2022–present)

== See also ==
- List of infantry divisions of the Soviet Union 1917–1957
