= 25th Combined Arms Army =

Russian Ground Forces formation

- 25-я общевойсковая армия
- Great emblem of the 25th Combined Arms Army
- Active: May 2023 – present
- Country: Russia
- Branch: Russian Ground Forces
- Type: Combined Arms
- Size: Army
- Part of: Central Military District
- Garrison/HQ: Yekaterinburg, Sverdlovsk Oblast
- Engagements: Russian invasion of Ukraine; Luhansk Oblast campaign

Commanders
- Current commander: Major General Rustam Yusupov

The 25th Combined Arms Army is a field army of the Russian Ground Forces that began forming in May 2023.

== History ==
The army was formed as part of the Russian military expansion announced in December 2022. Formation of the unit began in May 2023, with personnel recruited from Buryatia, Irkutsk, and the Russian Far East. The 31st and 37th regiments of the army's 67th Division were formed from volunteers from Bashkortostan and Tatarstan, respectively. The army headquarters is reportedly based in Yekaterinburg.

According to recruitment advertisements, the army was initially supposed to be deployed to Zaporizhzhia and Kherson regions in December. However, the unit was instead deployed to Luhansk Oblast in September, replacing the 76th Air Assault Division, which was sent to the Robotyne region, and the 41st Combined Arms Army, which was sent to an unspecified area in southern Ukraine. Initially understrength, the unit was fully staffed by the end of September with around 17,000 personnel stationed near Kreminna.

== Current structure ==
- 25th Combined Arms Army
  - 67th Motor Rifle Division
    - 31st Motor Rifle Regiment (Bashkortostan)
    - 36th Motor Rifle Regiment
    - 37th Motor Rifle Regiment
    - 19th Tank Regiment
  - 164th Separate Motor Rifle Brigade (Aleysk)
  - 169th Separate Motor Rifle Brigade
  - 11th Separate Tank Brigade
  - 73rd Artillery Brigade
  - 75th Artillery Brigade

== Commander ==
- Major General Andrey Seritsky (2023–2024)
- Major General Rustam Yusupov (2024–)
