= Miasozharivka =

Village in Luhansk Oblast, Ukraine

Miasozharivka М'ясожарівка
- Village
- Interactive map of Miasozharivka
- Location of Miasozharivka within Ukraine Miasozharivka (Ukraine)
- Coordinates: 49.4425°N 37.906944°E
- Country: Ukraine
- Oblast: Luhansk Oblast
- Raion: Svatove Raion
- Hromada: Kolomyichykha rural hromada
- Founded: 1953

Area
  - Total: 0.894 km^{2} (0.345 sq mi)
- Elevation: 144 m (472 ft)

Population (2001 census)
  - Total: 35
  - Density: 39/km^{2} (100/sq mi)
- Time zone: UTC+2 (EET)
  - Summer (DST): UTC+3 (EEST)
- Postal code: 92623
- Area code: +380 6471

Miasozharivka (Ukrainian: М'ясожарівка; Russian: Мясожаровка; until 2016 Artemivka (Артемівка)) is a village in Svatove Raion, Luhansk Oblast eastern Ukraine. It is located 141.24 kilometres (87.76 mi) northwest (NW) of the centre of Luhansk city. It belongs to Kolomyichykha rural hromada.

== History ==
The village was founded in 1953 under the original name of Artemivka. In 2016, the name of the village was decommunised and renamed Miasozharivka.

During the full-scale Russian invasion of Ukraine, the village was captured by Russian Forces. On 24 October 2022, the Armed Forces of Ukraine recaptured the village.

Renewed Russian attacks continued in June 2024. Russian forces recaptured the village by 6 October 2024.
