= Chervonopopivka =

Village in Luhansk Oblast, Ukraine

Chervonopopivka Червонопопівка
- Village
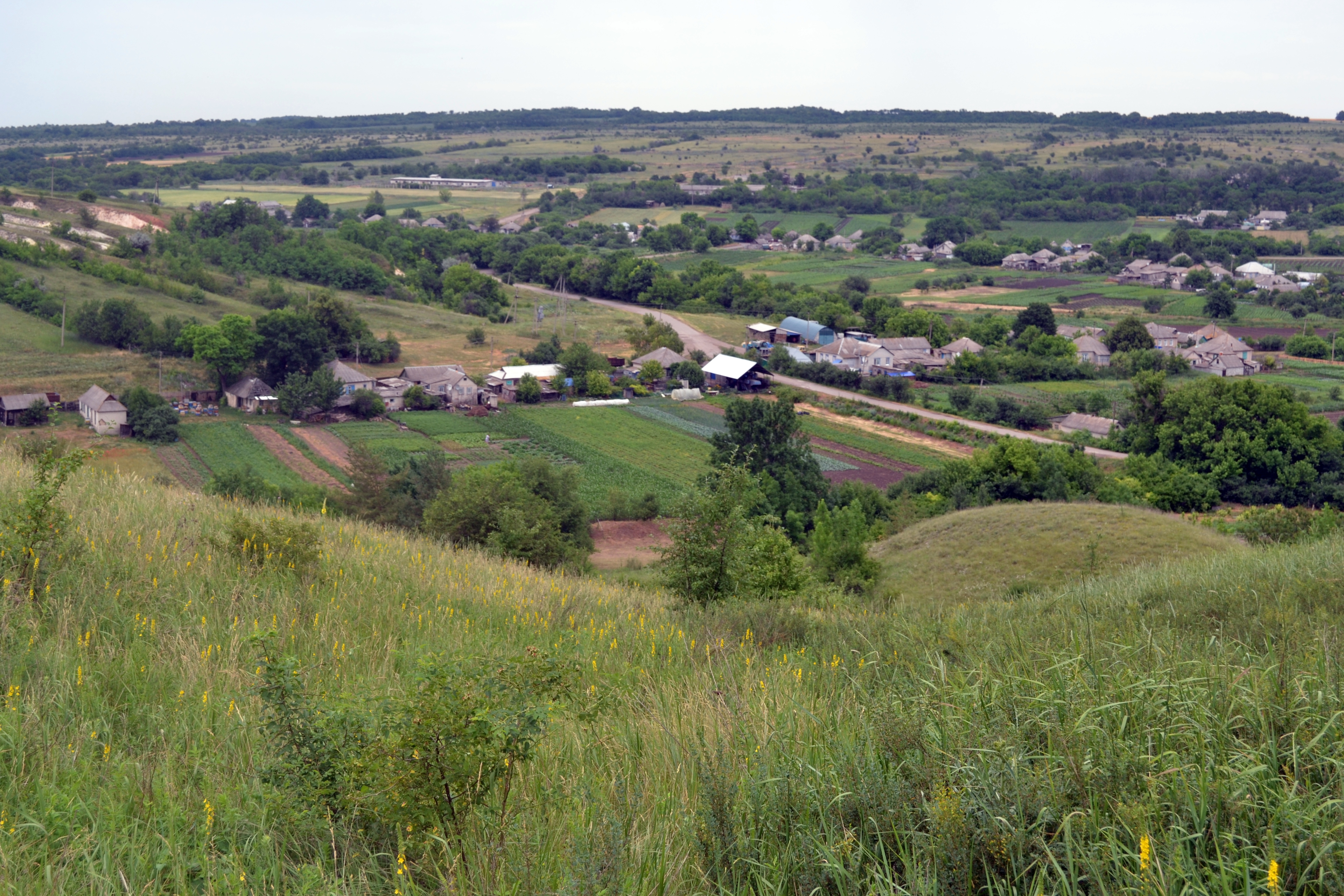
- Skyline of Chervonopopivka

- Location of Chervonopopivka Chervonopopivka (Ukraine)
- Coordinates: 49°07′53″N 38°08′46″E
- Country: Ukraine
- Oblast: Luhansk Oblast
- Raion: Sievierodonetsk Raion
- Hromada: Kreminna urban hromada

Population (2001)
  - Total: 1,042
- Postal code: 92924
- Area code: +380 6454
- Climate: Cfa

Chervonopopivka (Ukrainian: Червонопопівка) is a village in Sievierodonetsk Raion, Luhansk Oblast, Ukraine.

== History ==
The village of Chervonopopivka was historically located in the Kreminna Raion which, as of 18 July 2020, was abolished and merged into the Sievierodonetsk Raion.

During the Russian invasion of Ukraine, the village was captured and occupied by Russian forces in March 2022. Ukrainian forces would recapture the village in October 2022. The Russian Ministry of Defense reported that the village was recaptured by Russian forces on 11 December 2022, but on 15 December the village was recaptured by Ukraine according to ISW and the General Staff of the Armed Forces of Ukraine.

== Demographics ==
As of the 2001 Ukrainian census, the village had a population of 1,042 inhabitants. The native language composition was as follows:

First languages in Chervonopopivka
	percent
Ukrainian	93.5%
Russian	5.5%
Belarusian	1.0%
others	0.0%

== Notable people ==
- Prokopy Gerasimenko (1914–1944), commander and Hero of the Soviet Union
