= Nadiia, Luhansk Oblast =

Village in Svatove Raion, Luhansk Oblast, Ukraine

Coordinates: 49°22′13″N 37°55′33″E

Nadiia (Ukrainian: Наді́я) is a village in eastern Ukraine, located in Kolomyichykha rural hromada, Svatove Raion, Luhansk Oblast. It has a population of 25.

During the Russian invasion of Ukraine, the village was captured by Russian forces at some point. It was reportedly liberated by Ukrainian forces in October 2022. In August 2023, the Ukrainian military reported that Nadiia had been hit by Russian artillery strikes. Over the course of the next two months the village would be heavily contested before being re-captured by Russian forces. On March 23, 2025, Ukrainian forces of the 3rd Assault Brigade would again reportedly liberate the village after a years-long attrition campaign, with the Brigade spokesmen claiming that the fighting had rendered the Russian 752nd and 254th Motor Rifle Regiments combat ineffective due to their losses.
