= Zaymishche, Klintsy, Bryansk Oblast =

Zaymishche Займище
- Selo
- Location within Bryansk Oblast Location within Russia
- Coordinates: 52°43′N 32°14′E
- Country: Russia
- Region: Bryansk Oblast
- District: Klintsy
- Time zone: UTC+3:00

Zaymishche (Russian: Займище) is a rural locality (a selo) in Klintsy, Bryansk Oblast, Russia. The population was 5,028 (2021 census); and 5,297 as of 2010. There are 53 streets.

== Geography ==
Zaymishche is located 4 km south of Klintsy (the district's administrative centre) by road. Sinkovka is the nearest rural locality.
