= Novoselivske, Luhansk Oblast =

Village in Ukraine

Novoselivske Новоселівське
- Location within Luhansk Oblast Location within Ukraine
- Coordinates: 49°31′20″N 37°57′9″E
- Country: Ukraine
- Oblast: Luhansk Oblast
- Raion: Svatove Raion
- Settlement: 1934

Area
  - Total: 1,036 km^{2} (400 sq mi)
- Elevation: 182 m (597 ft)

Population (2023)
  - Total: 0
  - Density: 710.42/km^{2} (1,840.0/sq mi)
- Postal code: 92621
- Area code: +380 6454
- Climate: Cfa

Novoselivske (Ukrainian: Новоселівське) is a rural-type settlement in Kolomyichykha rural hromada, Svatove Raion, Luhansk Oblast, Ukraine. Prior to the Russian invasion of Ukraine, the population was 736. By January 2023, the town had no inhabitants as the population fled.

== History ==
On 1 June 1932, the state farm Komsomolets was created by splitting the state farm Topoli from the nearby village of Volodymyrivka. Soon afterwards, the village of Novoselivske was created next to the Komsomolets farm. The farm had 5,924 hectares (14,640 acres) of land, 4,288 of which were arable land. In 1934, a small herd of 350 cows and a pig farm were brought to Komsomolets. The first director of the farm was a communist named Pestov, the party secretary was Smolyakov, the commissar was M. N. Korzunetsky, and the chief agronomist was N. I. Litovka.

=== Russian invasion of Ukraine ===
Russian forces captured Novoselivske around 6 March 2022, with the rest of Svatove Raion. Ukrainian forces led by the Kraken Regiment recaptured the village on 30 December 2022. By 7 February 2023, there were no residents left in the village, and all buildings had been destroyed or seriously damaged. Luhansk Oblast governor Serhiy Haidai claimed that a Russian sniper shot the last remaining resident in January 2023. Clashes continued in the village in February. On 5 August 2023, Russia recaptured the village.
