= Stelmakhivka =

Village in Ukraine

Stelmakhivka Стельмахівка
- Village
- Stelmakhivka shown within Ukraine Stelmakhivka shown within Luhansk
- Coordinates: 49°28′17″N 37°54′07″E
- Country: Ukraine
- Oblast: Luhansk Oblast
- Raion: Svatove Raion
- Hromada: Kolomyichykha rural hromada
- Elevation: 146 m (479 ft)

Population (2022)
  - Total: 0
- Postal code: 92623
- Area code: +380 6471

Stelmakhivka (Ukrainian: Стельмахівка) is a village in Kolomyichykha rural hromada, Svatove Raion, Luhansk Oblast, Ukraine. It had a population of 505 in 2001, however little to no people remain nowadays. The body of local self-government is Stelmakhiv village council.

== Geography ==
The village is located near the border of Luhansk and Kharkiv Oblasts, 20 kilometers from Svatove and 23 kilometers from the urban settlement of Borova. Administratively, the village was arranged into the Svatove Raion in 2020. The elevation is 146 meters.

== History ==
The village was founded in 1864.

During the Russian invasion of Ukraine, the village was captured by Russia in 2022.

On 8 October 2022, the Armed Forces of Ukraine de-occupied the village from Russian forces. On 3 November 2022, the last civilians were evacuated from Stelmakhivka.

The village was claimed by Russia to have been recaptured by 29 August 2024, and geolocated footage confirmed the capture on 30 August.

== Demographics ==
As of the 2001 Ukrainian census, the village had 505 inhabitants. The native languages composition was:

Native languages in Stelmakhivka
	percent
Ukrainian	97.0%
Russian	3.0%
others	0.0%
