= 752nd Guards Motor Rifle Regiment =

Russian Ground Forces unit

752nd Guards Petrokovsky twice Red Banner, Orders of Suvorov, Kutuzov and Bogdan Khmelnitsky Motor Rifle Regiment (2016–present) 23rd Separate Guards Motorized Rifle Brigade (2009–2016) 81st Guards Motorized Rifle Regiment (1957–2009) 17th Guards Mechanized Regiment (1945–1957) 17th Guards Mechanized Brigade (1943–1945) 6th Guards Motorized Rifle Regiment (1942–1943) 210th Rifle Regiment (1939–1942)
- Russian: 752-й гвардейский мотострелковый Петроковский дважды Краснознамённый, орденов Суворова, Кутузова и Богдана Хмельницкого Волжский казачий полк
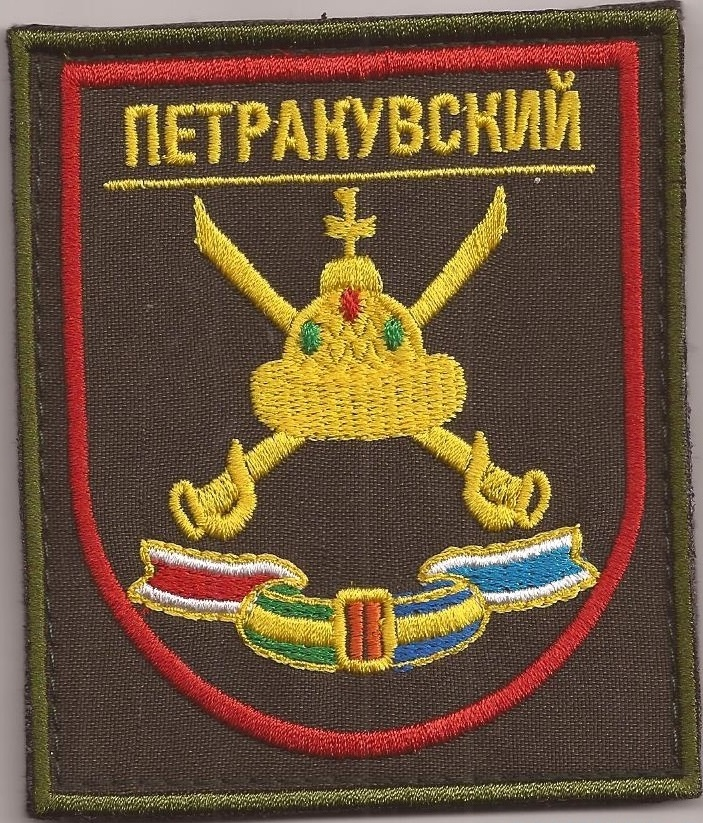
- Insignia of the 752nd Guards Motorized Rifle Regiment
- Active: 1939–2009; 2016–present
- Country: Soviet Union (1939–1991); Russia (1991–2009; 2016–present)
- Allegiance: Soviet Armed Forces; Russian Armed Forces
- Branch: (Soviet Union) Soviet Army; Russian Ground Forces
- Type: Mechanized infantry
- Role: Light Infantry
- Size: Regiment
- Part of: 20th Guards Combined Arms Army; 3rd Motor Rifle Division
- Garrison/HQ: Valuyki, Belgorod Oblast; MUN 34670
- Nickname: "Petrokovsky"
- Engagements: World War II; Soviet–Japanese border conflict; Battle of Khalkhin Gol; Great Patriotic War; Operation Barbarossa; Battle of Moscow; Battle of Rzhev, summer 1942; Orel–Kursk operation; Kamenets–Podolsky pocket; Sandomierz–Silesian offensive; Vistula–Oder offensive; Battle of Berlin; Prague offensive; Warsaw Pact invasion of Czechoslovakia; First Chechen War; Battle of Grozny; Russo-Ukrainian War; Invasion of Ukraine; 2023 Ukrainian counteroffensive; Battle of Avdiivka
- Decorations: Order of the Red Banner (2x); Order of Kutuzov; Order of Suvorov; Order of Bogdan Khmelnitsky
- Battle honours: Guards

The 752nd Guards Motor Rifle Petrokovsky twice Red Banner, Orders of Suvorov, Kutuzov and Bogdan Khmelnitsky Volga Cossack Regiment, (Russian: 752-й гвардейский мотострелковый Петроковский дважды Краснознаменный, орденов Суворова, Кутузова и Богдана Хмельницкого Волжский казачий полк; MUN 34670) is a mechanized infantry regiment of the Russian Ground Forces. The regiment is part of the 3rd Motor Rifle Division. It is stationed in the town of Valuyki and the village of Soloti in the Belgorod Oblast.

== History ==
=== Formation and combat actions of the regiment before 1941 ===
The 752nd Guards Motor Rifle Regiment was originally formed on June 26, 1939, based on the 2nd battalion of the 244th Territorial Rifle Regiment, as the 210th Rifle Regiment of the 82nd Rifle Division of the Urals Military District. In accordance with this directive, all units and subdivisions of the 82nd Rifle Division, along with the actual ones, received conditional names. The 210th Rifle Regiment was conditionally named military unit 602.

In early July 1939, the regiment was transferred as part of the division to the Khalkhin Gol river area, and while still en route, the 82nd Rifle Division received order No. 13285/op of the Zabaikalsky Military District Armed Forces dated July 4, 1939, to include it in the 57th Special Corps, which was transformed on July 19, 1939, into the 1st Army Group under the command of Corps Commander Georgy Zhukov.

On August 31, the combat operations of the 602nd (210th) Rifle Regiment was considered complete. Along with other units, the regiment was withdrawn to the reserve of the 1st Army Group. For active and courageous actions in the battles in the area of Peschanaya and Zelenaya hills, the 210th Rifle Regiment received a letter of thanks from the commander of the 1st Army Group, Gen. Georgy Zhukov.

After the end of hostilities, the 210th Rifle Regiment did not return to the Urals, but was left in Mongolia. Its permanent stationing place became the city of Choibalsan, where the regiment was stationed until October 7, 1941. In March 1940, the 210th Rifle Regiment was transferred to the organization chart of a motorized rifle regiment.

Due to the difficult situation near Moscow from October 7 to 25, 1941, the regiment was transferred to the Western Front as part of the 82nd Motorized Rifle Division, where the division became part of the 5th Army of Major General Leonid Govorov.

=== During the Eastern Front ===
On October 26, 1941, after unloading trains in the city of Zagorsk and completing the march Zagorsk — Moscow — Kubinka, the regiment immediately entered the battle of Moscow.

From October 26, the regiment fought in the area of the villages of Trufanovka, Boltino and Kapan. In these battles, the regiment destroyed up to 1,900 enemy soldiers and officers (including two colonels). Nine cannons, 12 mortars, 11 heavy and 17 light machine guns, 82 trucks, 7 passenger cars and 2 staff cars, 3 anti-aircraft guns and much other military equipment were captured. In the area of the village of Trufanovka, 78 commanders and Red Army soldiers of the 50th Rifle Division were freed from captivity.

On October 29, the regiment repelled an attack by a battalion of the SS 7th Infantry Division Germans, and killed 170 soldiers and officers in the battle. On November 2, the regiment engaged superior forces from the 197th Infantry Division of the Germans and routed its main group near the village of Kapan. Being half-encircled, the regiment continued to hold the defensive line it occupied and inflicted heavy losses on the enemy, destroying up to a regiment of enemy infantry. In the process, 25 enemy tanks were burned and disabled, and much other military property was captured.

On November 3, the Germans supported by tanks, counterattacked 6 times. The regiment demonstrated exceptionally high tenacity in defense and inflicted heavy losses on the enemy, destroying up to 1,000 soldiers and officers, burning and disabling 49 enemy tanks, and destroying much other military property. In the subsequent battles from November, 4 to December, 26 1941 the regiment repelled 12 enemy attacks, destroyed up to 1,000 soldiers and officers, burned and destroyed 26 tanks and 47 enemy vehicles. The regiment, along with other units of the division and the army as a whole, played an important role in stabilizing the defensive front in this direction.

In March 1942, it received the "Guards" title, transformed into the 6th Guards Motor Rifle Regiment. In June 1943, on the basis of the regiment, the 17th Guards Mechanized Red Banner Brigade was formed as part of the 6th Guards Mechanized Corps. The brigade was ceremoniously presented with the Guards Battle Banner.

During later years of the War in the Eastern Front, the regiment took part in the Battle of Rzhev, summer 1942, Orel–Kursk, Kamenets-Podolsky, Lvov-Sandomierz, Vistula-Oder, Berlin and Prague operations, ending combat in Czechoslovakia.

In 1944, the brigade's second battalion, under the command of Nikolai Goryushkin, took part in the capture of Czestochowa as a tank landing force. And for its direct participation in the capturing of the city of Piotrkow the brigade was awarded the honorary title of "Piotrokovskaya".

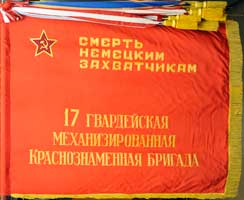
Battle Banner of the 17th Guards Mechanized Red Banner Brigade.

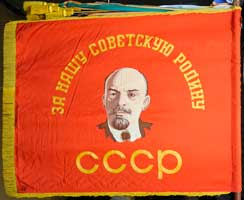
Battle Banner of the 17th Guards Mechanized Red Banner Brigade.

=== Cold War ===
In June 1945, based on the order of the People's Commissariat of Defense of the Soviet Union No. 0013 of June 10, 1945, the 17th Guards Mechanized Brigade was reformed into the 17th Guards Mechanized Regiment (military unit 49941) as part of the 6th Guards Mechanized Division (military unit 89428). From June 1946 it was located in Eberswalde in East Germany, part of the Group of Soviet Forces in Germany.

The unit was stationed (according to the entries in the historical form) in:

from 24.06.1945 to 05.07.1945 in the city of Hartberg, Austria.

from 28.08.1945 to November 1945 in the city of Winner-Neustadt.

In November 1945, the regiment was redeployed to Hungary in the city of Veszprém.

From 10.06.1946, the regiment was stationed in Eberswalde.

By order of the 6th Guards Division No. 00409 dated 01.11.1946, the regiment was folded into a regular battalion. And only on 25.04.1949 it was again expanded into a full-fledged regiment. As part of the creation of motor rifle divisions in 1957, the unit was again reformed. By Directive of the Commander-in-Chief of the Ground Forces No. OSH/1/243659 dated 12.03.1957, the 17th Guards Mechanized Regiment (until June 1945, the 17th Guards Mechanized Brigade) was reformed into the 81st Guards Motor Rifle Petrovskiy Twice Red Banner, Order of Suvorov, Kutuzov and Bogdan Khmelnitsky Regiment.

In 1961, according to the Order of the commander of the 6th Guards Motor Rifle Division of the 81st Guards. The MSP (without the 1st MSP) was introduced in the city of Berlin "to provide effective assistance to the Government of the GDR in the construction of the border between West and East Berlin." It was stationed in the suburb of Berlin — Karlshorst, GDR.

The regiment was located from 13 August 1961 to 24 January 1962 in Berlin and closely cooperated with separate commandant security battalions and the central (Berlin) border district of the GDR. After the regiment left Berlin, on August 20, 1962, the 6th Separate Guards Motor Rifle Brigade (USSR) was formed on the basis of the 133rd Separate Motor Rifle Battalion (133rd) (PP 75242), 154th (PP 51439), and 178th Separate Motor Rifle Battalion (178th) (PP 83398) separate commandant security battalions and other units of the 6th Guards Motor Rifle Division as part of the 20th Guards Combined Arms Army and stationed in Berlin — Karlshorst.

From 13 May to 5 September 1968, the regiment took part in Operation Danube. On 13 May, the regiment received an alarm signal and moved to a reserve area, marched 250 km and by 3.40 on 15 May had concentrated in the Kunnersdorf area. On 20 August 1968, the regiment received an order to cross the Czechoslovak Socialist Republic border and by 6.00 on 21.08.1968, had approached the eastern outskirts of Prague.

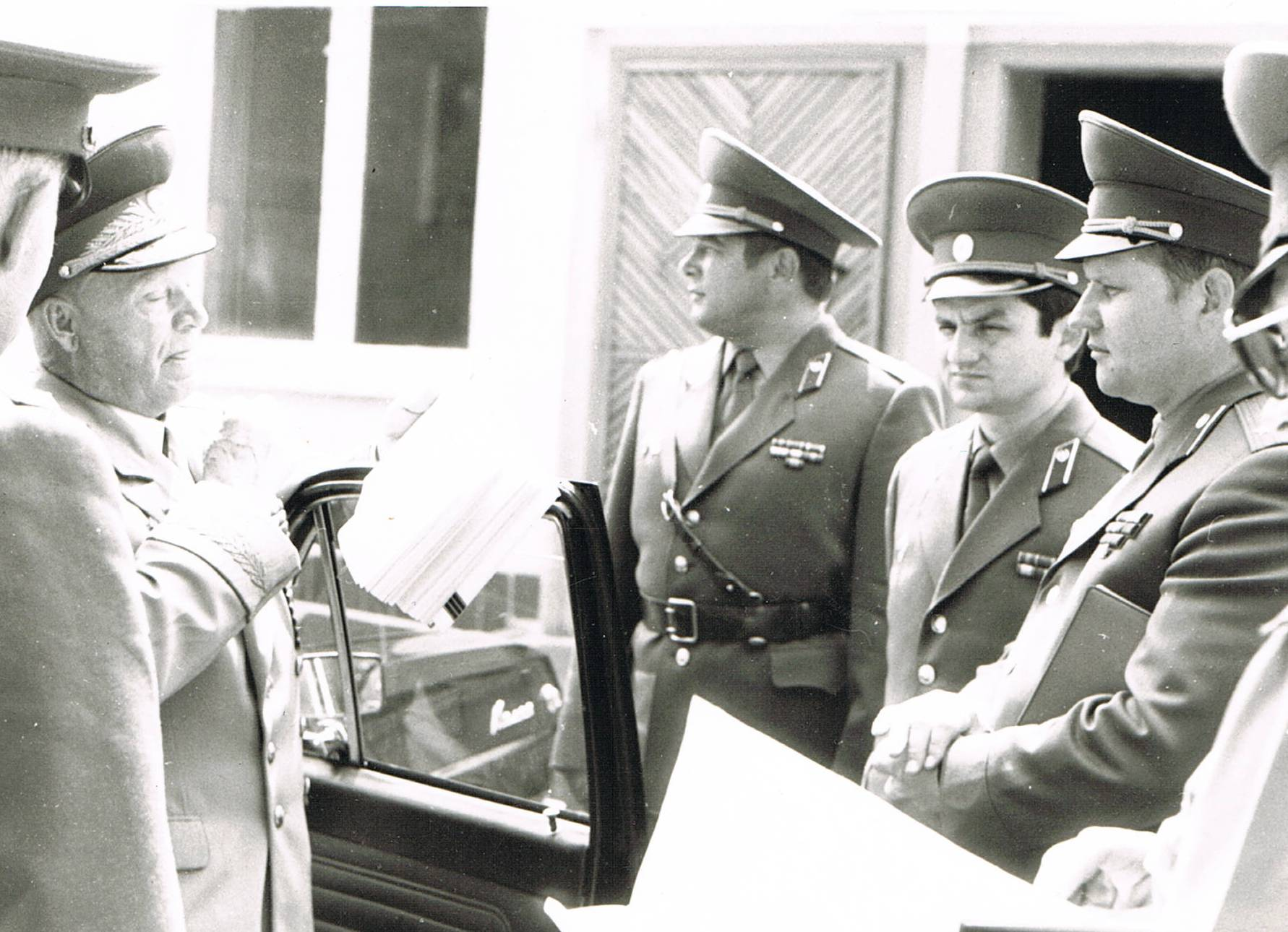
Former commander of the 4th Guards TA D.D. Lelyushenko, commander of the 81st Guards MRR A.V. Stepanov, head of the PO K. Khronusov, commander of the 6th Guards MRD A.A. Dorofeev in the barracks. Eberswalde, 1983.

On 12 September 1968, it left Prague and concentrated near it. On November 11, 1968, the regiment was withdrawn from Czechoslovakia and on November 12, 1968, it arrived at its permanent deployment location Eberswalde. In 1985, regiment within a reorganisation became part of the 90th Guards Tank Division.

=== Post Cold War ===
In 1993, in connection with the liquidation of the Western Group of Forces, the regiment, together with other units of the 90th Guards Tank Division was withdrawn to the territory of the Russian Federation and stationed in the village of Roshchinsky Samara Oblast, becoming part of the 2nd Guards Tank Army of the Volga Military District.

In accordance with the order of the Minister of Defense of the Russian Federation No. 036 dated June 15, 1994, the 81st Guards MRR stationed on the territory of the Volga Cossack Horde was given the traditional Cossack name "Volga Cossack".

In 1994–1995, as part of the "Northern" operational group, the regiment took part in the assault on Grozny during the First Chechen War. On 31 December 1994, during the Battle of Grozny, together with units of the 131st Separate Motor Rifle Brigade, it was surrounded. When breaking out of the encirclement, the regiment suffered significant losses; the regiment commander Yaroslavtsev and the regiment chief of staff Burlakov were wounded. As of the evening of January 2, 1995, out of 1,241 personnel (with reinforcements), 567 remained in service, that is, less than half. On or about 9 April 1995, the regiment was withdrawn from Chechnya.

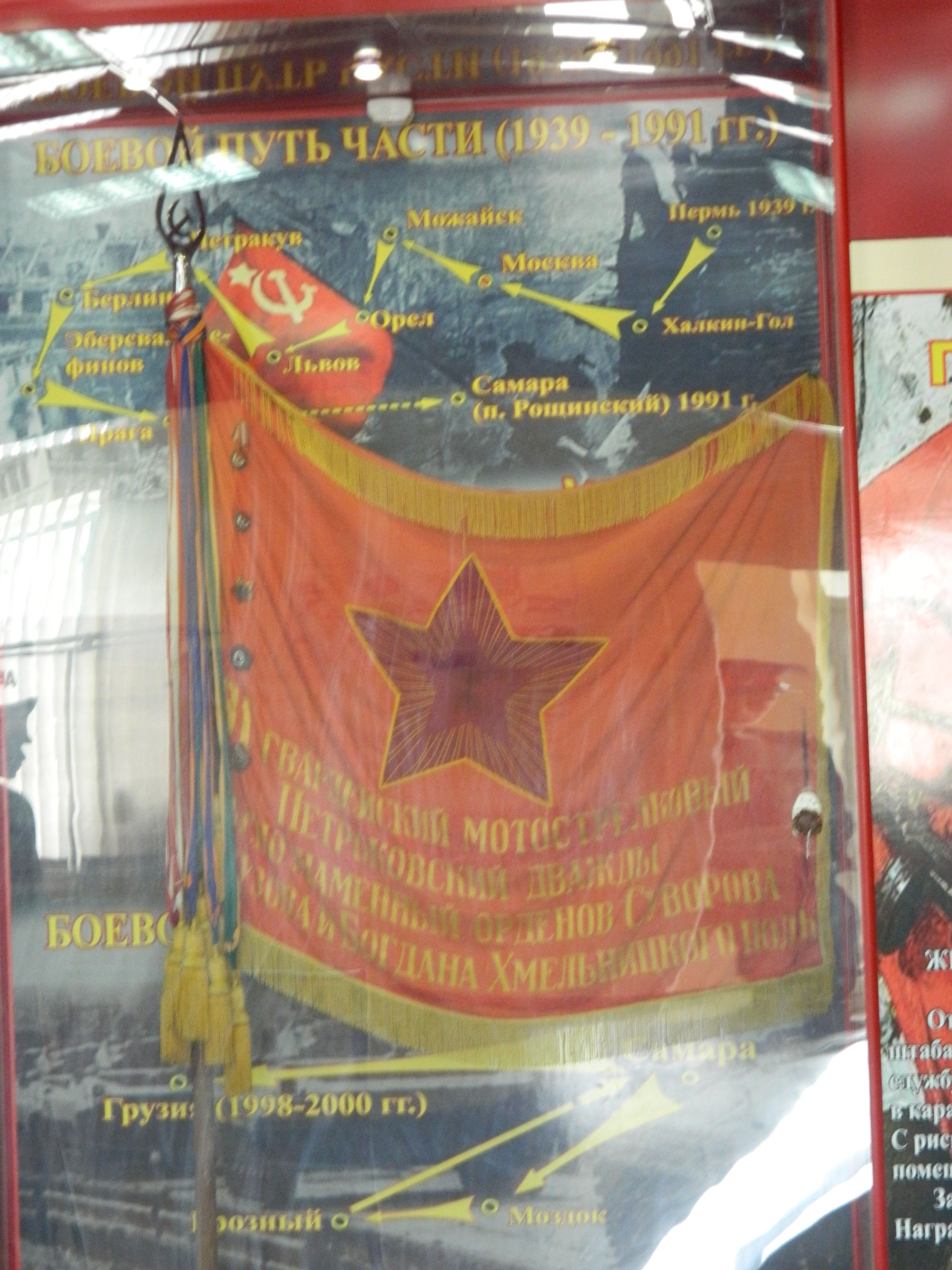
The battle flag of the regiment at the headquarters of the 23rd Separate Guards Motor Rifle Brigade, Twice Red Banner, Orders of Suvorov, Kutuzov and Bogdan Khmelnitsky, Volga Cossack Brigade.

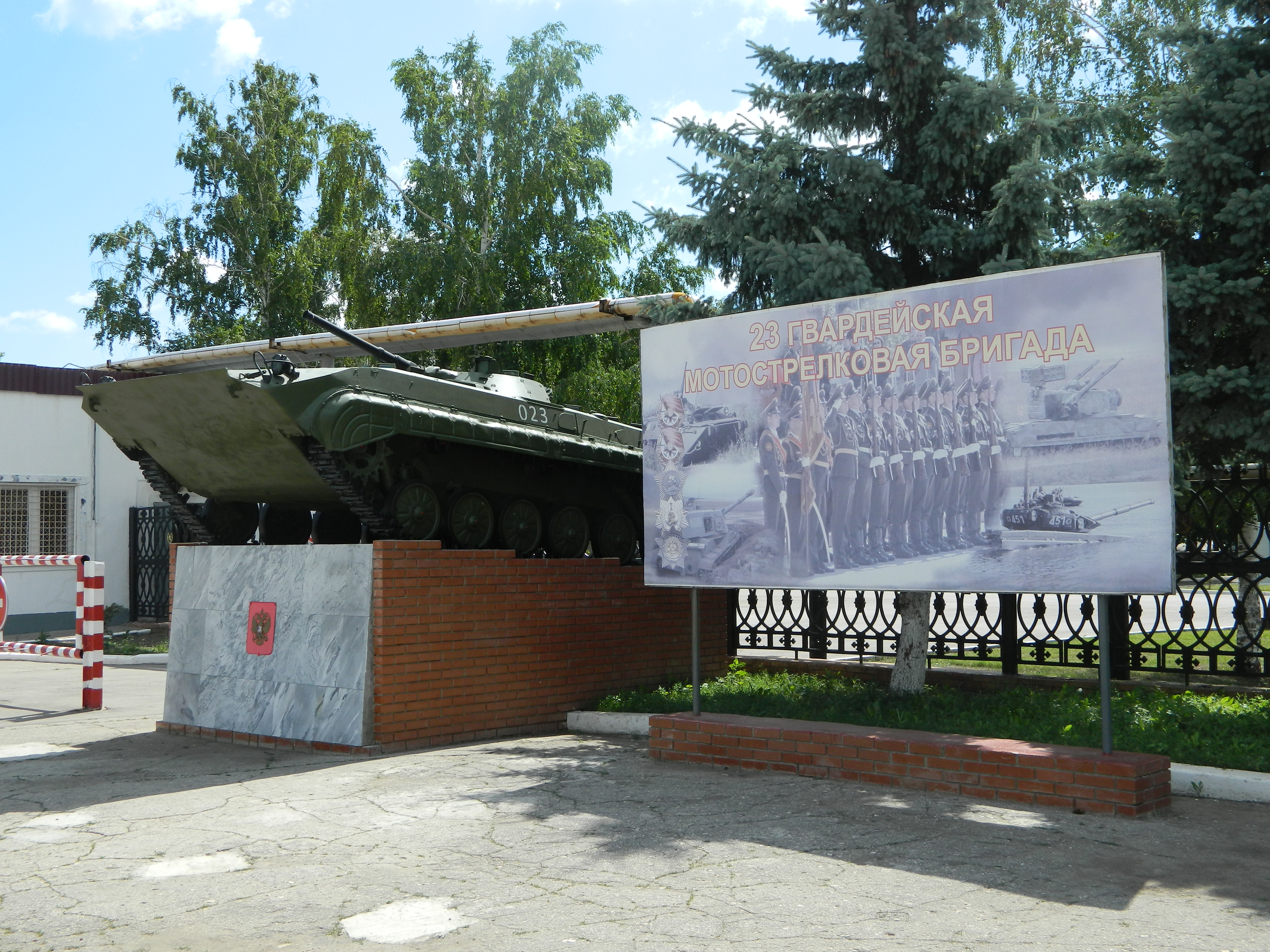
Checkpoint of the 23rd Guards Motor Rifle Brigade (2009–2016) in the suburbs of Samara.

In December 1997, the 90th Guards Tank Division was reduced to the status of a Base for Storage of Weapons and Equipment. As a result, the regiment was transferred to the 27th Guards Motor Rifle Division of the Volga Military District, and moved to the village of Kryazh (a suburb of Samara), becoming a regiment of constant readiness.

In the period from February to June 2009, on the basis of the 81st Guards Motor Rifle Regiment, was created, with the transfer of the Guards Battle Banner, awards, honorary titles and the historical form of the regiment, the 23rd Separate Guards Motor Rifle Petrovskaya twice Red Banner, Orders of Suvorov, Kutuzov and Bogdan Khmelnitsky Volga Cossack Brigade.

=== As 752nd Guards Motor Rifle Regiment ===
Exercise of the 752nd Guards Motorized Rifle Regiment on March 6, 2020 at one of the training grounds in the Voronezh Oblast using the BTR-82A, the Grad MLRS, and T-72B3 tanks.

Exercise of the 752nd Guards Motorized Rifle Regiment on July 15, 2020 at a training ground in the Nizhny Novgorod Oblast using the Grad MLRS and T-72B tanks.

In 2016, the 23rd Separate Guards Motor Rifle Brigade was moved from Samara to the city of Valuiki, Belgorod Oblast, and reorganized into the 752nd Guards Motor Rifle Regiment (Military Unit Number 34670) with the preservation of awards, ranks and historical traditions. There it joined the 3rd Motor Rifle Division.

On September 30, 2022, during the Russian invasion of Ukraine, the 752nd Motor Rifle Regiment found itself in an operational encirclement near Drobysheve and Lyman, Donetsk Oblast. Also in the operational encirclement was a detachment formed by the "Union of Donbass Volunteers" called the "Russian Legion" (aka "Bars-13"). Between 2023 and 2024, the regiment fought in the Battle of Avdiivka. At the end of 2023, 21 lawsuits were filed to recognize the servicemen of the military unit of the regiment as dead.

It was reported in March 2025 that the regiment had suffered losses in combat against Ukraine's 3rd Assault Brigade near the village of Nadiia in the Luhansk Oblast.

== Commanders ==
Regimental/Brigade Commanders

- 19.03.1958 — 10.1960 Guards Lieutenant Colonel Kirillov, Ivan Vasilyevich
- 08.10.1960 — 09.1964 Guard Colonel Rozantsev Alexey Trofimovich
- 16.09.1964 - 1968 Guards Lieutenant Colonel Ryzhkov Nikolai Mikhailovich
- 1969-1971 - Guard Lieutenant Colonel Komarov Vladimir Ivanovich
- 1969-1969 - Guard Lieutenant Colonel Antonov Anatoly Petrovich
- 28.06.1971 — 08.1976 Guard Lieutenant Colonel Galiev Rifkhat Nurmukhametovich
- 13.08.1976 — 1979 Guard Major Rogushin Sergey Pokopievich
- 1979 — 07.1981 Guard Major Kruglov Gennady Alekseevich
- 10.07.1981 — 11.1983 Guard Lieutenant Colonel Stepanov Anatoly Vasilyevich
- 15.11.1983 — 07.1985 Guard Major Bespalov Boris Georgievich
- 13.07.1985 — 07.1988 Guard Lieutenant Colonel Makadzeev Oleg Borisovich
- 03.07.1988 — 1990 Guard Lieutenant Colonel Negovor Vladimir Alekseevich
- 1990 — 05.1991 Guard Lieutenant Colonel Borisenok Sergey Vladimirovich
- 17.05.1991 — 01.1995 Guard Lieutenant Colonel Yaroslavtsev, Alexander Alekseevich
- 17.01.1995 - 11.1997 Guard Colonel Aidarov Vladimir Anatolyevich
- 29.11.1997 — 1998 Guard Colonel Stoderevsky Yuri Yurievich
- 1998-2000 Guard Lieutenant Colonel Gerasimenko Alexander Vladimirovich
- 30.09.2000 — 01.2004 Guard Lieutenant Colonel Kovalenko, Dmitry Ivanovich, Major General Deputy Commander 49th Army
- 10.01.2004 — 12.2005 Guard Colonel Yankovsky Andrey Ivanovich
- 20.12.2005 — 02.2008 Guard Lieutenant Colonel Shkatov Evgeny Evgenevich
- 13.02.2008 — 08.2009 Guard Colonel Milchakov Sergey Vitalievich
- 03.08.2009 — 2011: Guards Colonel Yankovsky, Andrey Ivanovich
- 2011-2011: Guards Colonel Ignatenko, Alexander Nikolaevich
- 2012 — 11.2013: Guards Colonel Tubol, Evgeny Viktorovich
- from 11.2013 — 2016: Guard Major General Stepanishchev, Konstantin Vladimirovich

Chiefs of Staff-First Deputy Commanders

- 1957-1958 Guard Lieutenant Colonel Tsivenko Nikolai Mikhailovich
- 1959-1960 Guard Lieutenant Colonel Rozantsev Alexey Timofeevich
- 1961-1962 Guard Lieutenant Colonel Lakeev Mikhail Ivanovich
- 1963-1967 Guard Lieutenant Colonel Efankin Boris Fedoseevich
- 1968-1970 Guard Lieutenant Colonel Berdnikov Evgeny Sergeevich
- 1971-1972 Guard Lieutenant Colonel Gubanov Nikolay Ivanovich
- 1973-1974 Guard Major Yachmenev Evgeny Alekseevich
- 1974-1975 Guard Major Kalinin Vitaly Vasilyevich
- 1975-1977 Guard Captain Stogrin Zinovy Ivanovich
- 1977-1979 Guard Major Dryapachenko Nikolay Alekseevich
- 1980-1983 Guard Major Bespalov Boris Georgievich
- 1983-1984 Guard Major Shirshov Alexander Nikolaevich
- 1984-1987 Guard Lieutenant Colonel Mikhailov Valery Georgievich
- 1987-1991 Guard Major Egamberdiev Bahadir Abdumannabovich
- 1991-1992 Guard Major Samolkin Alexey Nikolaevich
- 1994 Guard Lieutenant Colonel Zyablitsev Alexander Perfirevich
- 1994 Guard Lieutenant Colonel Burlakov Semyon Borisovich
- 1995 Guard Lieutenant Colonel Aleksanrenko Igor Anatolyevich
- 1995 VRIO KMSP Guard Lieutenant Colonel Stankevich, Igor Valentinovich
- 1996-1997 Guard Major Kirill Vladimirovich Vechkov
- 1998 Guard Major Kuzkin Vladimir Alexandrovich
- 1999-2001 Guard Lieutenant Colonel Medvedev Valery Nikolaevich
- 2002 Guard Lieutenant Colonel Minnullin Nail Raufovich
- 2003-2004 Guard Lieutenant Colonel Yarovitsky Yuri Davidovich
- 2005-2006 Guard Lieutenant Colonel Stepanishchev Konstantin Vladimirovich
- 2007-2008 Guard Lieutenant Colonel Zakharov Sergey Vladimirovich
- 2009 Guard Lieutenant Colonel Boldyrev Andrey Vladimirovich

Deputy Commanders for the Political Unit

- 1957-1958 Guard Lieutenant Colonel Pridvorny Nikolai Fyodorovich
- 1959-1962 Guard Major Zhuga Ivan Stepanovich
- 1963-1968 Guard Lieutenant Colonel Panahov Ibrahim Teimurovich
- 1969 Guard Lieutenant Colonel Timofeev Diogen Vasilievich
- 1970-1971 Guard Lieutenant Colonel Matveev Victor Ivanovich
- 1972-1975 Guard Major Sukhachev Yuri Vladimirovich
- 1976-1977 Guard Lieutenant Colonel Kondratenko Gennady Deonisovich
- 1978-1979 Guard Major Bukatin Alexander Grigorievich
- 1980-1983 Guard Major Voloshenko Anatoly Yurevich
- 1984-1986 Guard Lieutenant Colonel Cherny Iosif Iosifovich
- 1987-1988 Guard Major Kirilov Boris Alekseevich
- 1989 Guard Major Ashirbaev Isabek Botbaevich
- 1990 Guard Lieutenant Colonel Mekhovich Alexander Mecheslavovich
- 1991 Guard Major Kutovoy Dmitry Ivanovich
- 1992-1996 Guards Lieutenant Colonel Stankevich, Igor Valentinovich
- 1997 Guard Major Fomin Alexander Gennadievich
- 1998 Guard Lieutenant Colonel Frank Sergey Yakovlevich
- 1999-2001 Guard Lieutenant Colonel Kuzmin Valentin Nikolaevich
- 2002 Guard Lieutenant Colonel Fomin Alexander Gennadievich
- 2003 Guard Lieutenant Colonel Paziy Alexey Petrovich
- 2004-2005 Guard Lieutenant Colonel Tonkikh Dmitry Viktorovich
- 2006-2008 Guard Lieutenant Colonel Kurepin Alexey Vladimirovich

== Awards and honorary titles ==
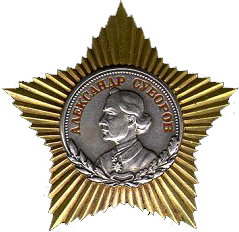
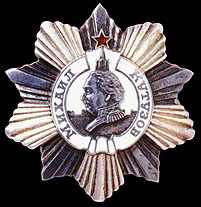
Awards and titles inherited by the unit	Year, month, date, decree numbers
Guards For bravery shown in battles with the German invaders, fortitude, courage, discipline and heroism of personnel, awarded to the 210th Red Banner Motorized Rifle Regiment	Order of the People's Commissar of Defense of the USSR dated March 17, 1942, No. 78
«Petrokovsky» For distinction in battles to capture the city of Pitroków (Petrokov), awarded to the 17th Guards Mechanized Red Banner Brigade	Order of the Supreme Commander-in-Chief of February 19, 1945 No. 014
For the capture of the station Dorokhovo and the city of Mozhaisk, the 210th Motorized Rifle Regiment was awarded the Order of the Red Banner	Decree of the Presidium of the Supreme Soviet of the USSR of May 3, 1942
For the capture of the city of Berlin the 17th Guards Mechanized Red Banner, Orders of Suvorov, Kutuzov and Bogdan Khmelnitsky Brigade was awarded the Order of the Red Banner	Decree of the Presidium of the Supreme Soviet of the USSR of June 4, 1945
For the liberation of the city of Lviv the 17th Guards Mechanized Red Banner Brigade was awarded the Order of Suvorov 2nd degree	Decree of the Presidium of the Supreme Soviet of the USSR of August 10, 1944
For the capture of the cities of Ratibor, Biskau, the 17th Guards Mechanized Red Banner, Order of Suvorov Brigade was awarded the Order of Kutuzov, 2nd degree	Decree of the Presidium of the Supreme Soviet of the USSR of April 26, 1945
For the capture of the cities of Cottbus, Lübben, Zossen, Beelitz, Luckenwalde, Trebbin, Treuenbrietzen, Zahna, Marienfelde, Rangsdorf, Diedersdorf, Teltow the 17th Guards Mechanized Red Banner, Orders of Suvorov and Kutuzov Brigade was awarded the Order of Bohdan Khmelnitsky, 2nd degree	Decree of the Presidium of the Supreme Soviet of the USSR of May 26, 1945

== Distinguished soldiers ==
Two servicemen of the regiment became Heroes of the Russian Federation during the anti-terrorist operation on the territory of the Chechen Republic in 1994-1995.

Hero of the Russian Federation
	Surname, name, patronymic	Rank, position(s). Decrees of the President of the Russian Federation.
1.	Kirichenko, Grigory Sergeevich	Guards senior warrant officer, senior technician of the 1st company of the 81st Guards Motor Rifle Regiment (21.06.1995, Меdal № 173)
2.	Stankevich, Igor Valentinovich	Guards lieutenant colonel, deputy commander of the 81st Guards Motor Rifle Regiment for educational work (19.10.1995, Меdal № 238)

=== Lists of the dead and missing soldiers ===
The list of the dead of the 81st Motor Rifle Regiment (90th Guards TD) as provided on the website “Dedicated to the Memory of the Servicemen”.

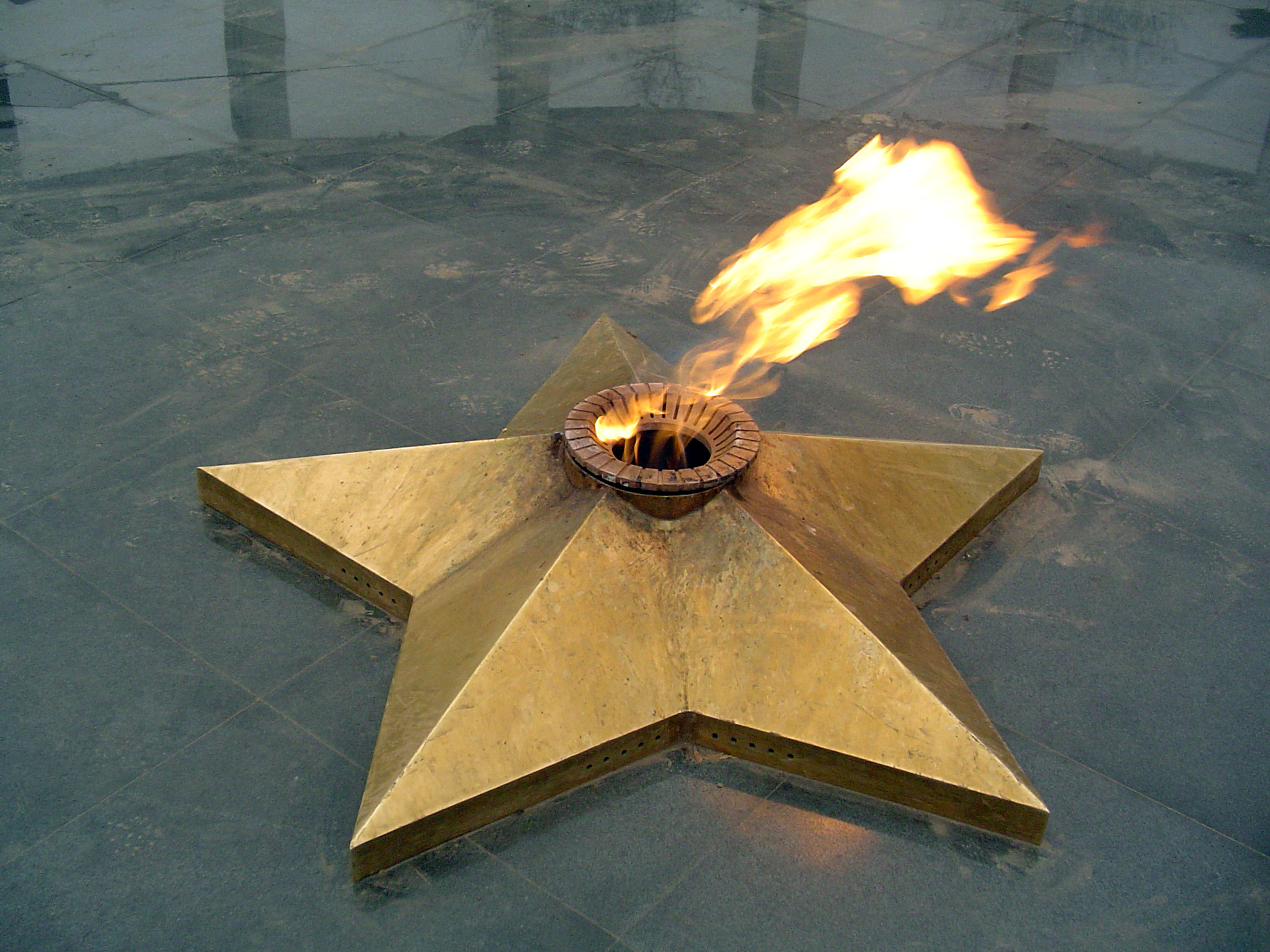
Eternal flame for the servicemen of the unit in Pushkino.

== March of the regiment ==
External image
- March of the regiment performed by the author - A. Konyukhov.

Words and music by Alexander Konyukhov

Dedicated to my fellow soldiers of all times and to my commander Oleg Borisovich Makadzeev

81st Guards Regiment Shrouded in valor and glory! Five orders on your banner Shining — the awards of the Motherland!

How many roads have been traveled,
We are rightfully proud of you.

Our regiment is ready to defeat any enemy!

To increase the glory of our fathers and grandfathers!

There is a tank on a pedestal in the regiment, As a mother's memory of her son. Motherland, you remember all the soldiers Who died in battle for Russia.

We swear to remember the Great Days
Our fathers and grandfathers are an example for us.
A step into immortality. The defeated Reichstag.
And above the Berlin sky the scarlet banner of Victory!

We all who live are given one life We know the price of tears and grief. And, repeating the names of the fallen, We call upon the planet for peace.

We have enough will, enough fire,
We do not hide our power.
But, keeping the formidable weapon,
We call upon all nations to fight for peace!

GSFG, Eberswalde-Finow (October 1985 — August 1986)

After the regiment's participation in the First Chechen War, two verses were added to the text:

Author Hero of Russia Igor Stankevich

When we entered the city of Grozny, We did not dream of awards. We did not save our friends from bullets. But we did not lose the honor of the regiment!

The equipment burned, hearts were torn
Mothers and wives cried.
Fathers, we fulfilled your order-
We went for Holy Rus' without arguing.
