= Dibrova, Sievierodonetsk Raion, Luhansk Oblast =

Village in Kreminna Raion, Luhansk Oblast, Ukraine

Coordinates: 49°00′01″N 38°06′43″E

Dibrova (Ukrainian: Діброва) is a village in the Sievierodonetsk Raion, Luhansk Oblast, Ukraine. In 2001, it had a population of 338. Until 2016, it was known as Chervona Dibrova (Ukrainian: Червона Діброва). The village is located close to Kreminna and Pryvyllia, north of the Serebrianskiy Forest and the Siverskiy Donets. The elevation is 98 meters.

== Russian invasion of Ukraine ==
In 2022, during the Russian invasion of Ukraine, Dibrova was captured alongside the whole of the Luhansk Oblast by Russian and Luhansk People's Republican forces. It was retaken by Ukrainian forces in December 2022. The area, as of May 2023, remains contested.

== Demographics ==
As of the Ukrainian national census in 2001, the village had a population of 338 inhabitants. In terms of spoken language, the village is overwhelmingly Ukrainophone, while a significant minority speaks Russian as their primary language. The exact linguistic composition was as follows:

Native languages in Dibrova
	percent
Ukrainian	83.1%
Russian	15.1%
Belarusian	0.9%
others	0.9%
