= LXIX Corps =

LXIX Corps or 69th Corps may refer to:

- LXIX Army Corps, Wehrmacht, Germany
- 69th Rifle Corps, Soviet Union
- 69th (Liverpool) Lancashire Rifle Volunteer Corps, United Kingdom

== See also ==
- List of military corps by number
- 69th Brigade (disambiguation)
- 69th Division (disambiguation)
- 69th Regiment (disambiguation)
- 69th (disambiguation)
