= 69th =

69th is the ordinal form of the number 69. 69th or Sixty-ninth may also refer to:

- A fraction, 1/69, equal to one of 69 equal parts

== Geography ==
- 69th meridian east, a line of longitude
- 69th meridian west, a line of longitude
- 69th parallel north, a circle of latitude
- 69th parallel south, a circle of latitude
- 69th Street (disambiguation)

== Military ==
- 69th Army (Soviet Union)
- 69th Division (disambiguation)
- 69th Regiment (disambiguation)
- 69th Squadron (disambiguation)

== Other ==
- 69th century
- 69th century BC

== See also ==
- 69 (disambiguation)
