= Route 69 (disambiguation) =

Route 69 may refer to:

- Route 69 (MBTA)
- London Buses route 69
- Melbourne tram route 69

== See also ==
- 69 (disambiguation)
- List of highways numbered 69
