= 69th Guards Motor Rifle Division =

69th Guards Motor Rifle Division (2024–present) 138th Guards Motor Rifle Brigade (1997–2024) 45th Guards Motor Rifle Division (1957 – 1997) 45th Guards Rifle Division (1942 – 1957) 70th Rifle Division (1934 – 1942)
- Russian: 69-я гвардейская мотострелковая Красносельская ордена Ленина, Краснознамённая дивизия
- Active: 1934–present
- Country: Soviet Union (1934–1991); Russia (1991–present)
- Branch: Soviet Army (until 1991); Russian Ground Forces (1991–present)
- Type: Mechanized infantry
- Size: Division
- Part of: 6th Combined Arms Army; Leningrad Military District
- Garrison/HQ: Kamenka, Leningrad Oblast; MUN 02511
- Engagements: World War II; Soviet-Finnish War; Continuation War; Siege of Leningrad; Courland Pocket; Transnistrian War; Abkhazia conflict; Georgian–Ossetian conflict; First Chechen War; Battle of Grozny; Second Chechen War; Battle of Grozny (1999–2000); Russian military intervention in Syria; Russian invasion of Ukraine; Battle of Kharkiv; 2024 Kharkiv offensive; Kupiansk offensive
- Decorations: Guards; Order of Lenin; Order of the Red Banner
- Battle honours: Krasnoe Selo

Commanders
- Current commander: Colonel (Guards) Sergei Maksimov

The 69th Guards Motor Rifle Krasnoe Selo Order of Lenin Red Banner Division (Russian: 69-я гвардейская мотострелковая Красносельская ордена Ленина, Краснознамённая дивизия, MUN 02511) is a formation of the Russian Ground Forces. It is stationed in the Leningrad Military District, in the village of Kamenka, Vyborgsky District, Leningrad Oblast. It includes various components: air defense, artillery battalion, infantry and tank battalions. The late brigade was expanded into the 69th Guards Motor Rifle Division in May 2024.

== History ==
=== Division in the World War II ===
The division traces its history to the 70th Territorial Rifle Division formed in Kuibyshev in 1934. After 22 June 1941, the division fought near Leningrad, in Estonia and Kurland. The division was with the 6th Guards Army of the Kurland Group, Leningrad Front in May 1942. On 16 October 1942, for holding the "Nevsky Pyatachok", it was transformed into the 45th Guards Order of Lenin Rifle Division (45th Guards Rifle Division).

On January 19, 1944, in heavy fighting, it captured the settlement of Krasnoe Selo and played a decisive role in lifting the siege of Leningrad during the Red Army offensive. Later in 1945, the 45th Guards Division liberated Vyborg and participated in the operation to destroy Army Group Courland in the Courland Pocket of Latvia. During the Great Patriotic War, 20 soldiers of the division became Heroes of the Soviet Union.

In 1944, the 45th Guards Rifle Division was located in the village of Kaukyarvi in the Vyborg District on the former Mannerheim Line, which was stormed by units of the 45th Division during the Soviet-Finnish War of 1939-1940 and Continuation War. It was part of the 30th Guards Leningrad Red Banner Rifle Corps for the rest of the existence of the USSR.

=== Division after World War II ===
On 25 June 1957 the 45th Guards Rifle Division became the 45th Guards Motor Rifle Division. In 1992, the division received so-called peacekeeping status. After that, the division's peacekeeping battalion, under the command of Lieutenant Colonel Sergei Kremlev, spent 5 months in Moldova's unrecognized breakaway region of Transnistria, in the area of Dubăsari and Rîbnița. Between 1992 and 1994, it carried out peacekeeping and separation missions in the Georgian-Abkhazian, Georgian-Ossetian armed conflicts, Yugoslav War and the civil war in Tajikistan.

In 1994–1995, soldiers of the 45th Guards Motor Rifle Division took part in the First Chechen War. Guardsmen of the 129th Guards Motor Rifle Regiment with 80 tanks under the command of Guards Colonel Alexander Borisov and the 133rd Separate Guards Tank Battalion carried out tasks to restore constitutional order. The fiercest clashes took place in Battle of Grozny and Khankala.

In December 1997, in connection with the military reform of the Russian Armed Forces, the new Minister of Defense Igor Sergeyev created from the 45th Guards Motor Rifle Division the 138th Separate Guards Motor Rifle Krasnoselskaya Order of Lenin, Red Banner Brigade, which inherited the orders, honorary titles, historical form, military glory and all the traditions of the unit.

In 1999–2000, the brigade, as part of the Zapad group, operated in the Second Chechen War. In early February 2000, units of the brigade blocked the village of Katyr-Yurt in the Achkhoy-Martan district during Operation Wolf Hunt, which involved pursuing the surviving gangs after the storm of Grozny. The brigade then proceeded through the Asinovskoye Gorge further south into the mountainous terrain.

The brigade was deployed in other operations during the war, in which, along with other Russian Ground Forces units, its personnel was reported to have behaved badly at times. A 22-year-old woman in Ingushetia was shot by drunken soldiers from the brigade scavenging for alcohol. The deployment of a tank battalion of the brigade was apparently halted when it was discovered that soldiers had been selling the explosive from their tanks' reactive armour. For both Chechen wars, four fighters of the 138th Brigade were awarded the title Hero of Russia.

In March 2010 Leningrad Military District commander General Lieutenant Nikolai Bogdanovsky said, regarding problems with the command and violence in the 138th at Kamenka: ". . . we haven't managed to complete fully tasks connected with discipline–in particular, in the 138th Kamenka Brigade the commander, chief of staff, and assistants for armaments and socialization work were dismissed because of events there. Now the situation is normalising, we are trying not to repeat past mistakes." Since 1 September 2010, in connection with the liquidation of the Leningrad Military District, it has become part of the newly created Western Military District.

=== Russian invasion of Ukraine ===
Since February 2022, the 138th Brigade has taken part in the Russian invasion of Ukraine. According to Helsingin Sanomat, social media sources claim the brigade with two battle groups of approximately 800 men was fighting in battle of Kharkiv. Local inhabitants of Kamenka interviewed by Helsingin Sanomat claim the brigade has suffered losses and hundreds of soldiers were wounded, with 270 being hospitalized and another 80 being moved to hospitals; however, the paper was unable to verify the claims.

On 20 March 2022, Ukraine claimed that 10 servicemen in the 138th were being investigated for refusing to fight and encouraging others in the unit to return home. Elements of the brigade were routed in the battle of Kharkiv and were withdrawn into Russia. At the end of 2023, the brigade was in the north of the Luhansk Oblast, participating in the defense of Kreminna and in the attempts of Russian forces to attack on Kupiansk.

On 1 May 2024, the 138th Brigade was transformed into the 69th Guards Motor Rifle Krasnoselskaya Order of Lenin, Red Banner Division while retaining the historical form, honorary name, awards and military glory. It has been reported that the division was deployed to fight in the 2024 Kharkiv offensive and in Vovchansk.

According to Ukrainian military observer Kostiantyn Mashovets, the 69th Motor Rifle Division operated in a bridgehead over the Oskil River within and south of the town of Dvorichna in January and February 2025. In February and March, units of the division reportedly operated near Kindrashivka and Fyholivka, and in April, the Russian ministry of defense credited the division's 344th Motor Rifle Regiment with the capture of Kamianka.

== Structure ==
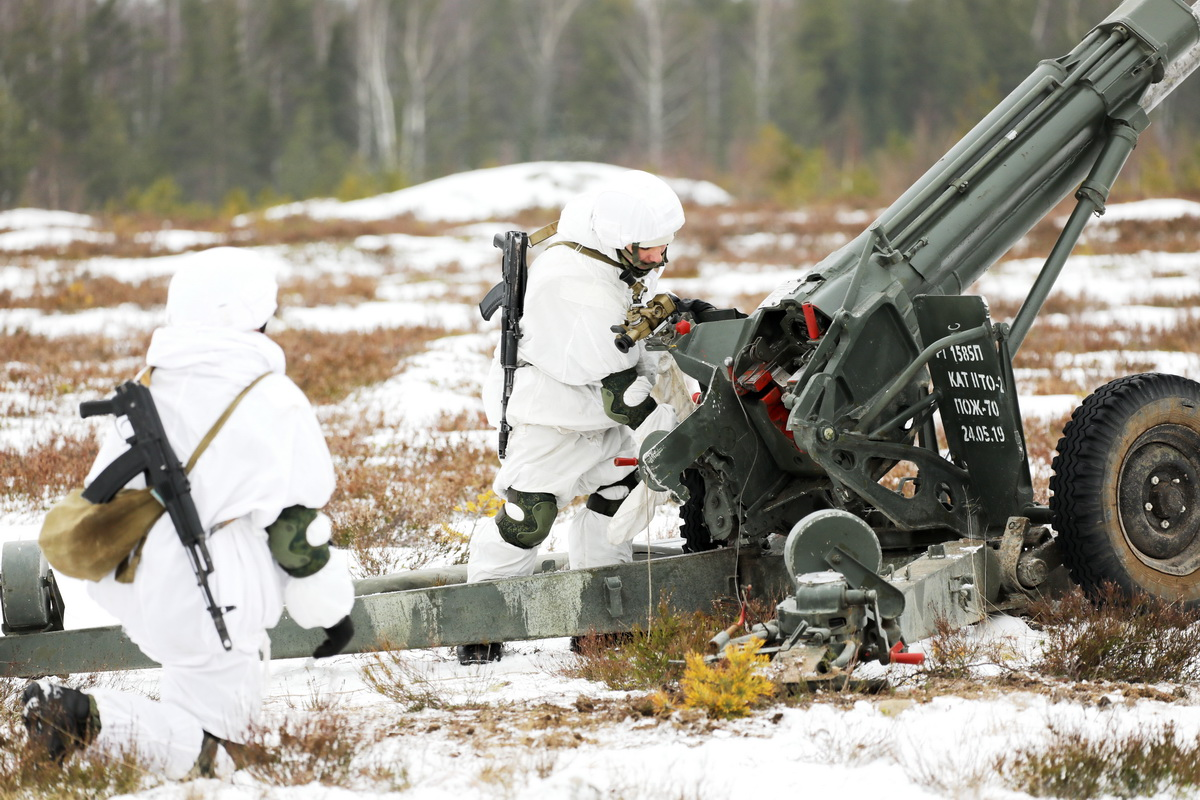
2B16 120 mm gun-howitzer-mortar of the 69th Guards Motor Rifle Division in 2020.

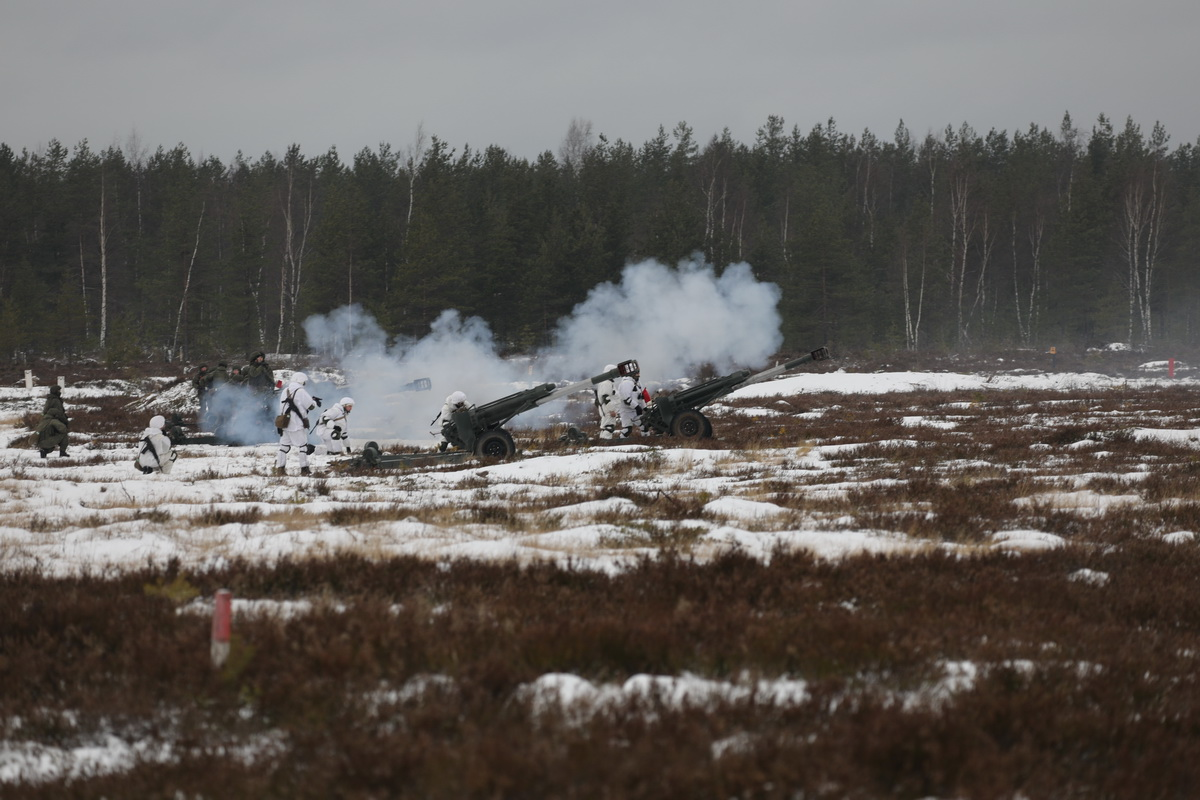
2B16 120 mm gun-howitzer-mortar of the 69th Guards Motor Rifle Division in 2020.

Command structure in 2024

- Division HQ
- 83rd Motorized Rifle Regiment
- 667th Guards Leningrad Motor Rifle Regiment;
- 697th Guards Leningrad Motor Rifle Regiment;
- 708th Guards Leningrad Red Banner Motor Rifle Regiment;
- 133rd Guards Idritsky Red Banner, Order of Suvorov Tank Regiment;
- Division Artillery Group
  - 486th Guards Leningrad Red Banner Self-Propelled Artillery Regiment;
  - 383rd Rocket Artillery Battalion;
  - 1525th Anti-Tank Artillery Battalion;
- 247th Guards Anti-Aircraft Missile Regiment;
- 49th Guards Engineer Battalion;
- 511th Separate Electronic Warfare Battalion;
- Reconnaissance battalion;
- Medical battalion;
- Command (communications) battalion;
- Repair and recovery battalion;
- Logistics battalion;
- Commandant's company;
- NBC protection company;
- UAV company;
- Orchestra.

== Commanders ==
1. Major-General Mikhail Malofeyev (21.11.1997 – 15.7.1999)
2. Major General Igor Turchanyuk (05.8.1999 – 07.7.2000)
3. Colonel Bagir Yusuf oglu Fatulayev (temporarily filled the post of 08.07.2000 – 21.09.2000)
4. Major General Anatoli Elkin (22.9.2000 – 22.02.2002)
5. Major General Andrey Serdyukov (temporarily filled the post in 10.03.2002, has been appointed 11.7.2002 – 09.6.2004)
6. Major-General Vladimir Genrikhovich Tsilko (22.6.2004 – 14.6.2005)
7. Colonel Alexander Romanenko (14.6.2005 – 24.4.2008)
8. Colonel Vladimir Frolov (temporarily filled the post of 25.4.2008 – 19.6.2008)
9. Colonel Alibek Navruzbekovich Aslanbek (20.6.2008 – 10.2009)
10. ...
11. Colonel (Guards) Sergei Maksimov (2021–2024)

== Heroes of Russia ==
- Lieutenant Colonel Gerasimov, Vadim Sergeevich, commander of a motorized rifle battalion, 2022, (posthumous).
- Guards Senior Lieutenant Efimov, Aleksandr Aleksandrovich, deputy company commander of a reconnaissance battalion, 2022, (posthumous).
- Guards Senior Lieutenant Sorokin, Oleg Gennadyevich, deputy commander of the 4th motorized rifle company for military-political work of the 2nd motorized rifle battalion, 2023, (posthumous).
- Guards Senior Lieutenant Paschenko, Aleksey Sergeevich, Deputy Company Commander, 2023 (posthumously).

== Gallery ==
138th Guards Motorized Rifle Brigade's exercise (02-03-2021)

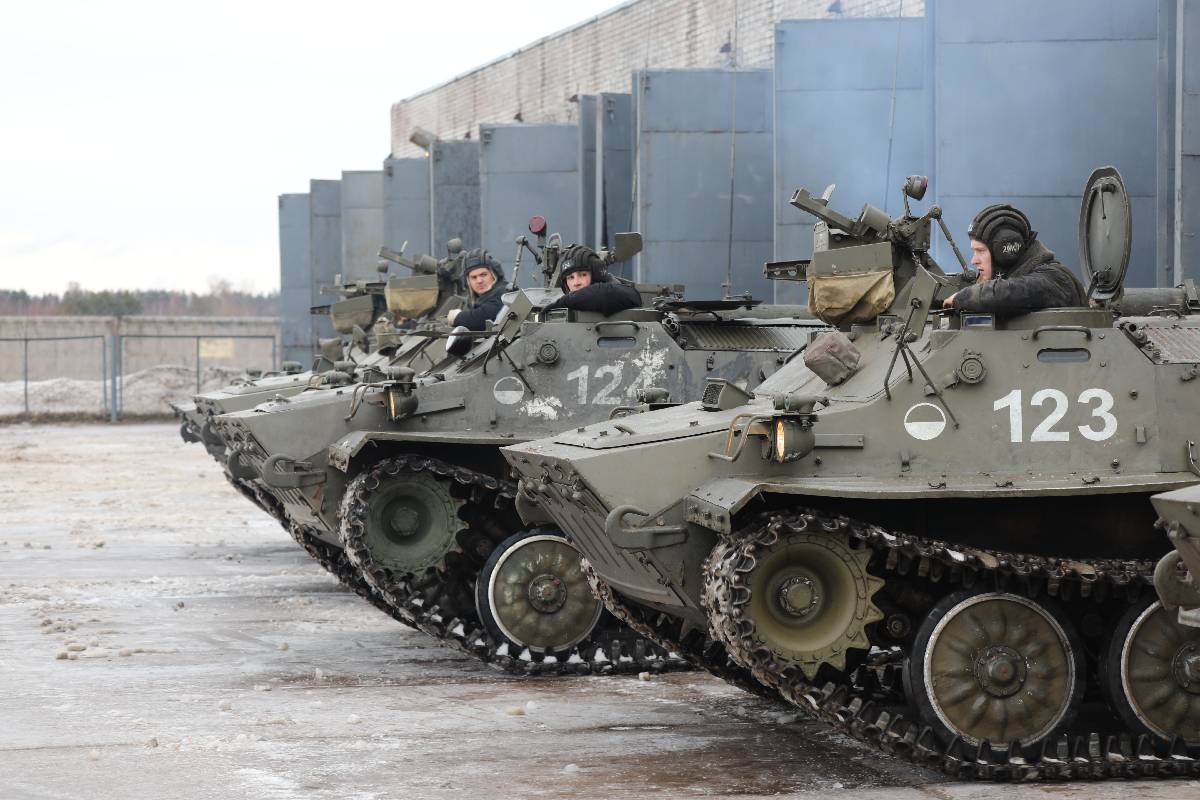

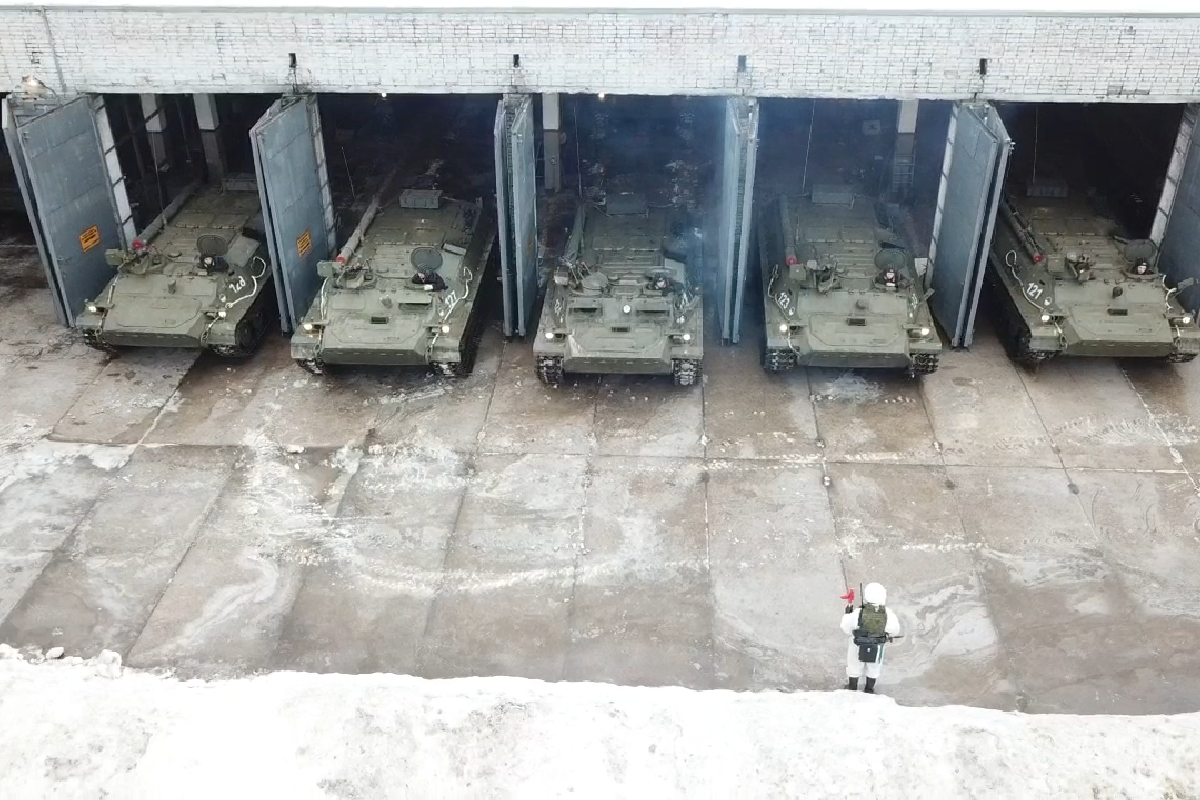

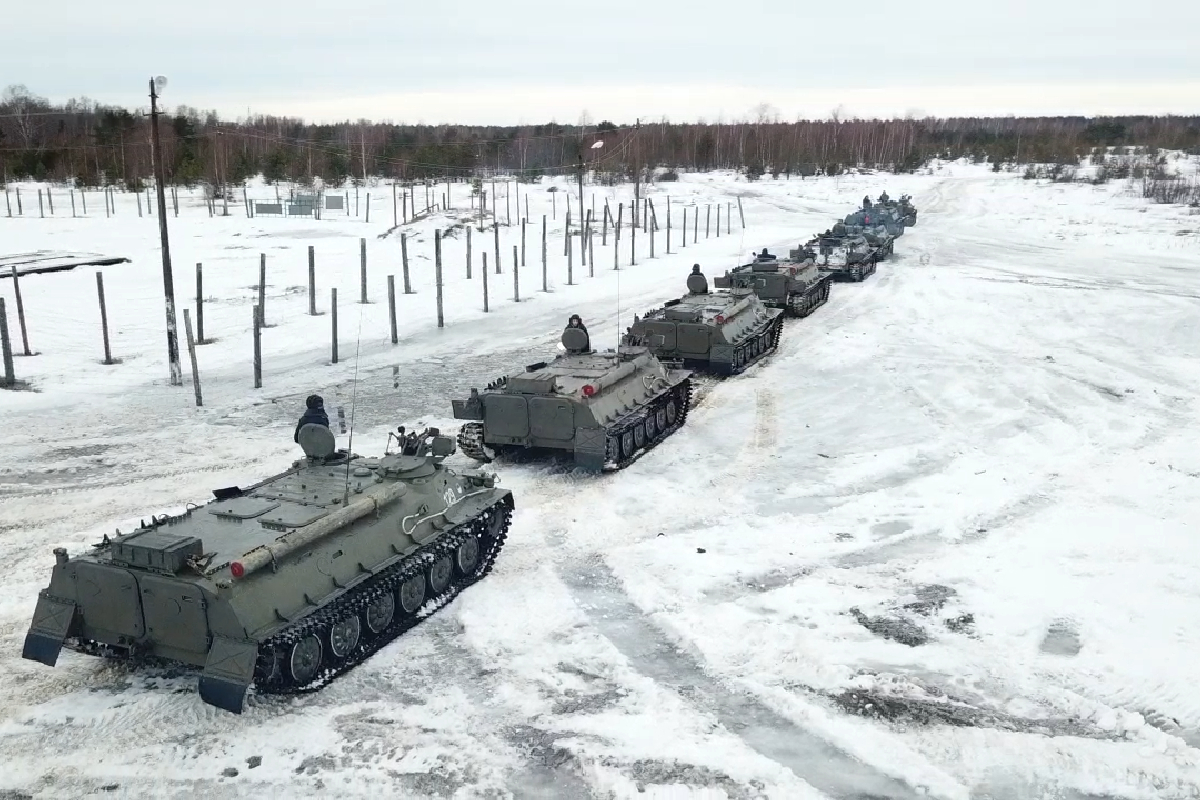

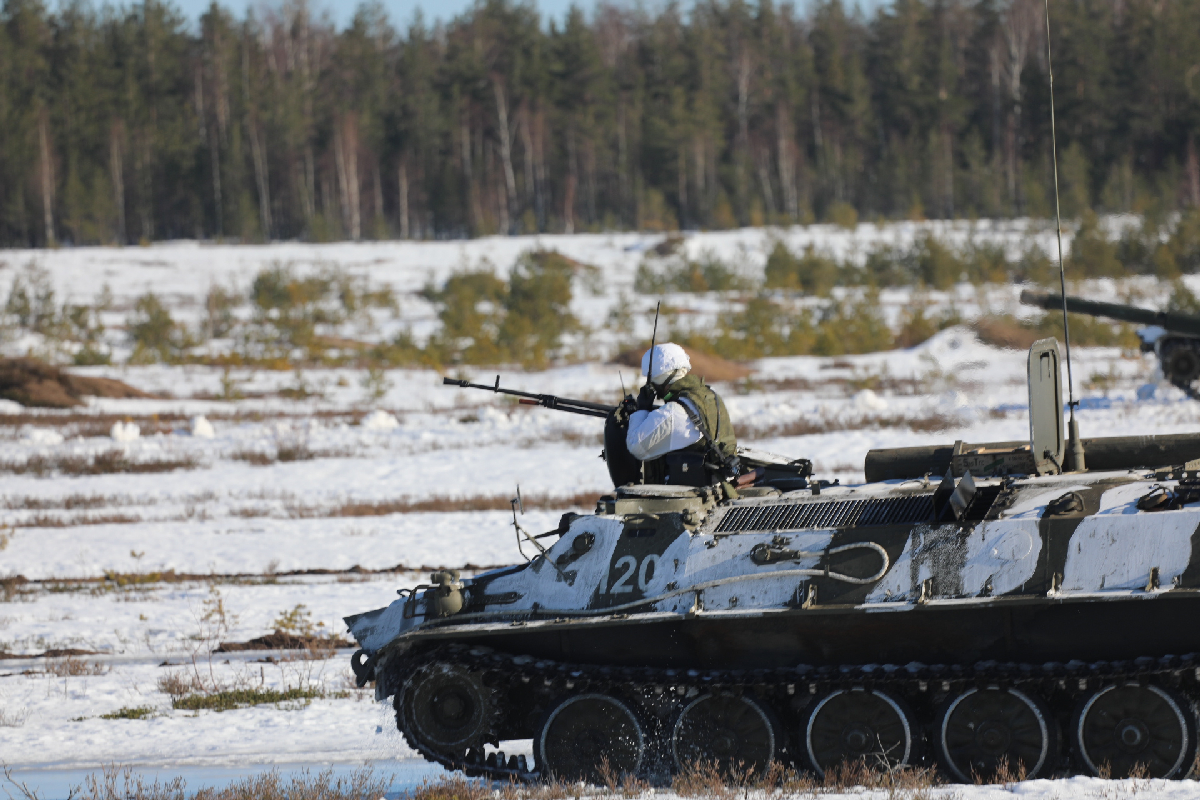

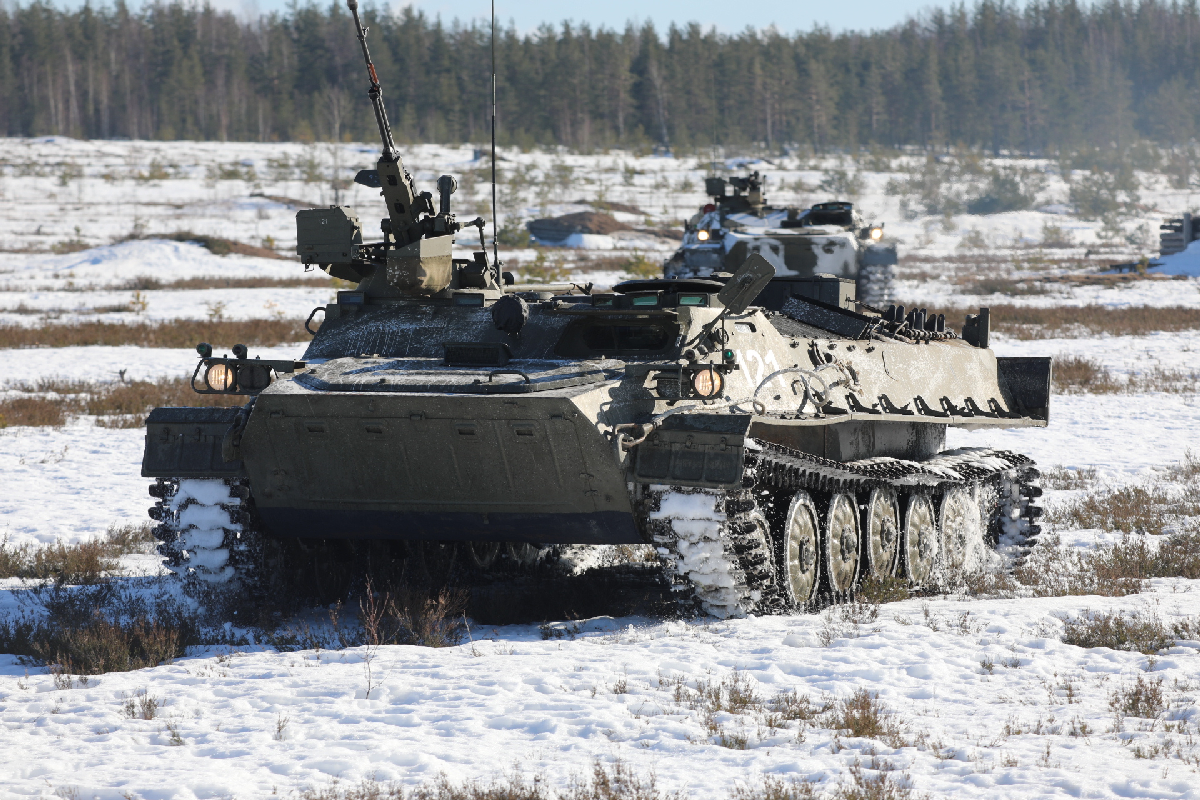

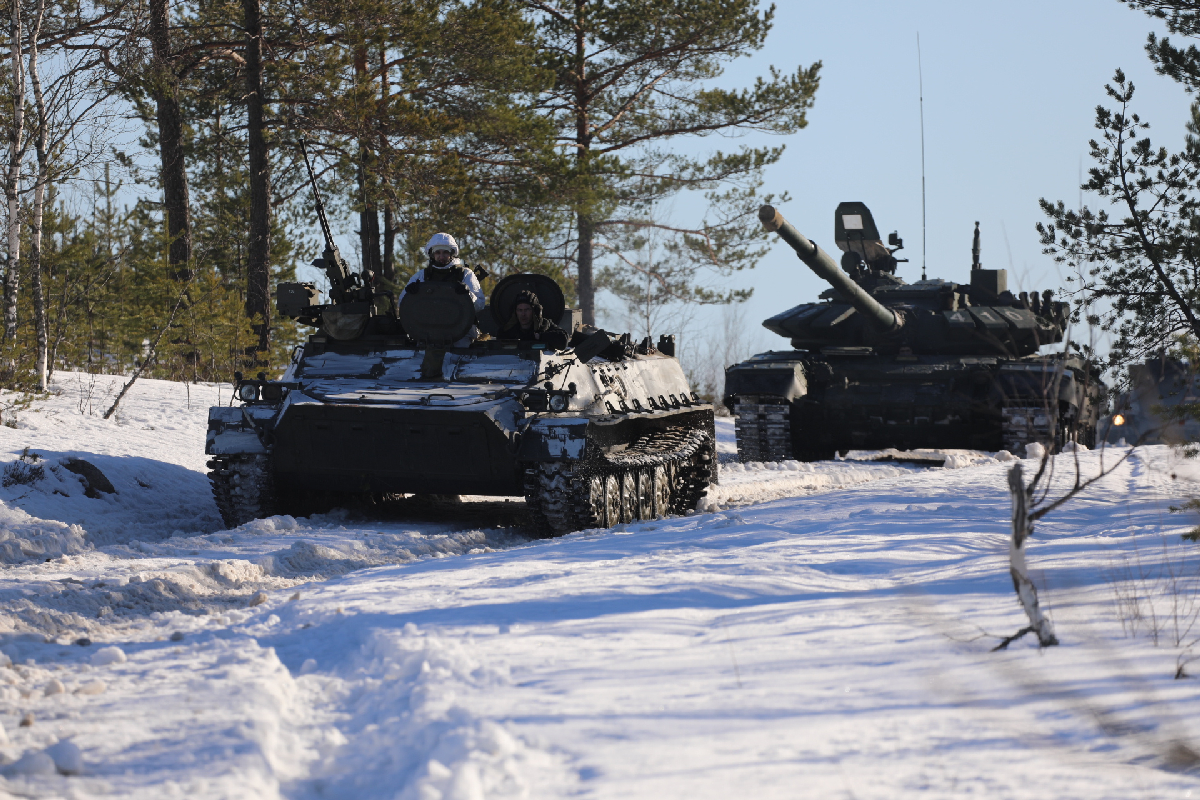

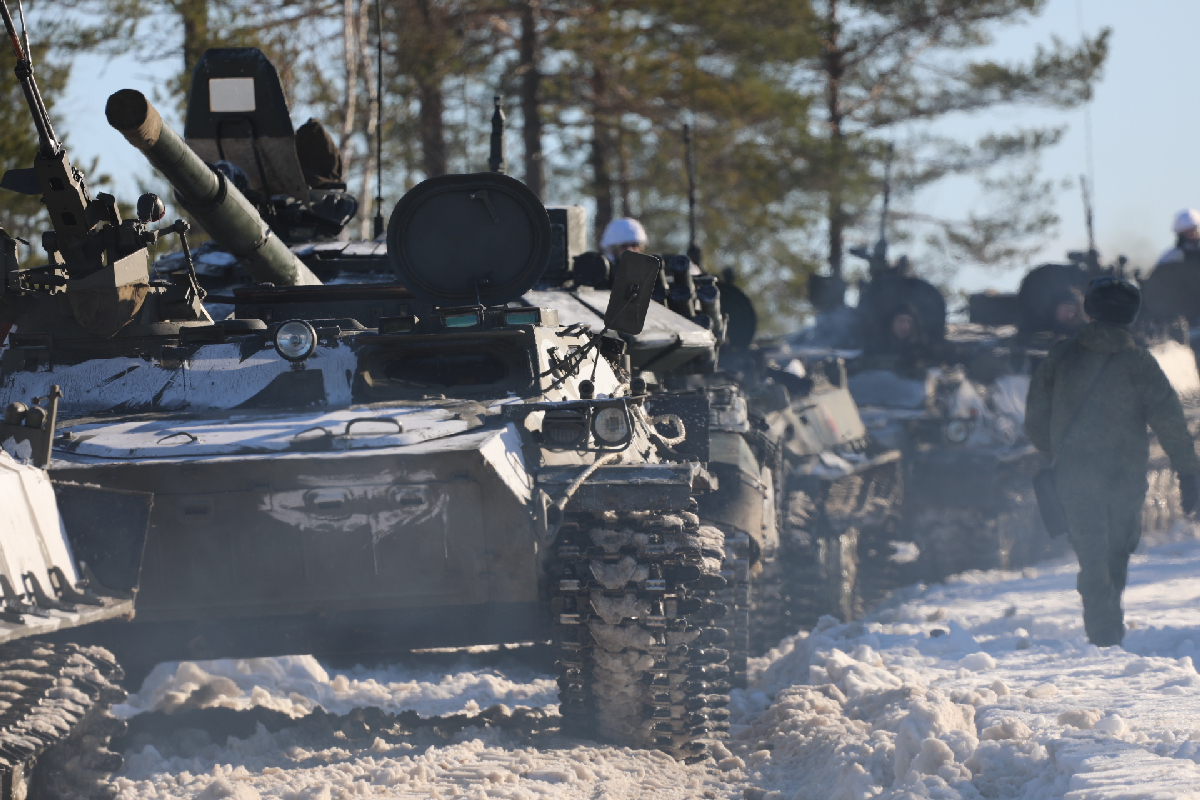

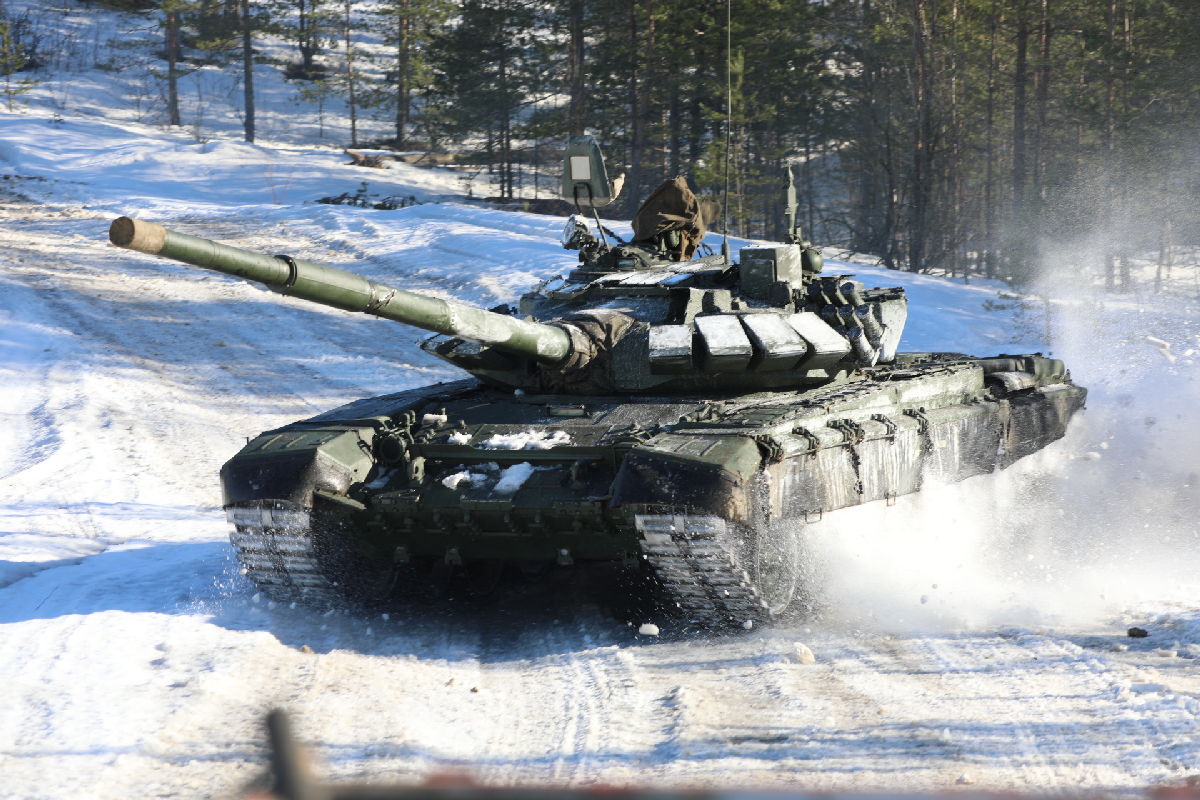

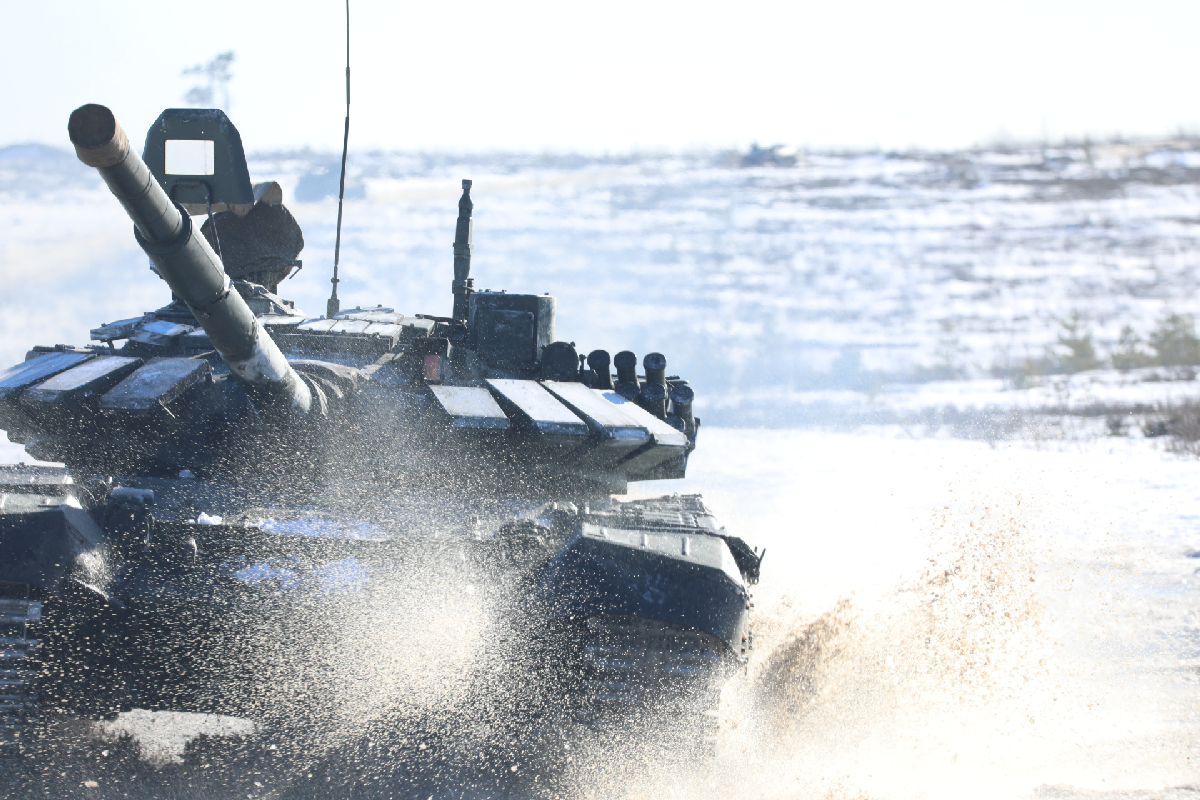

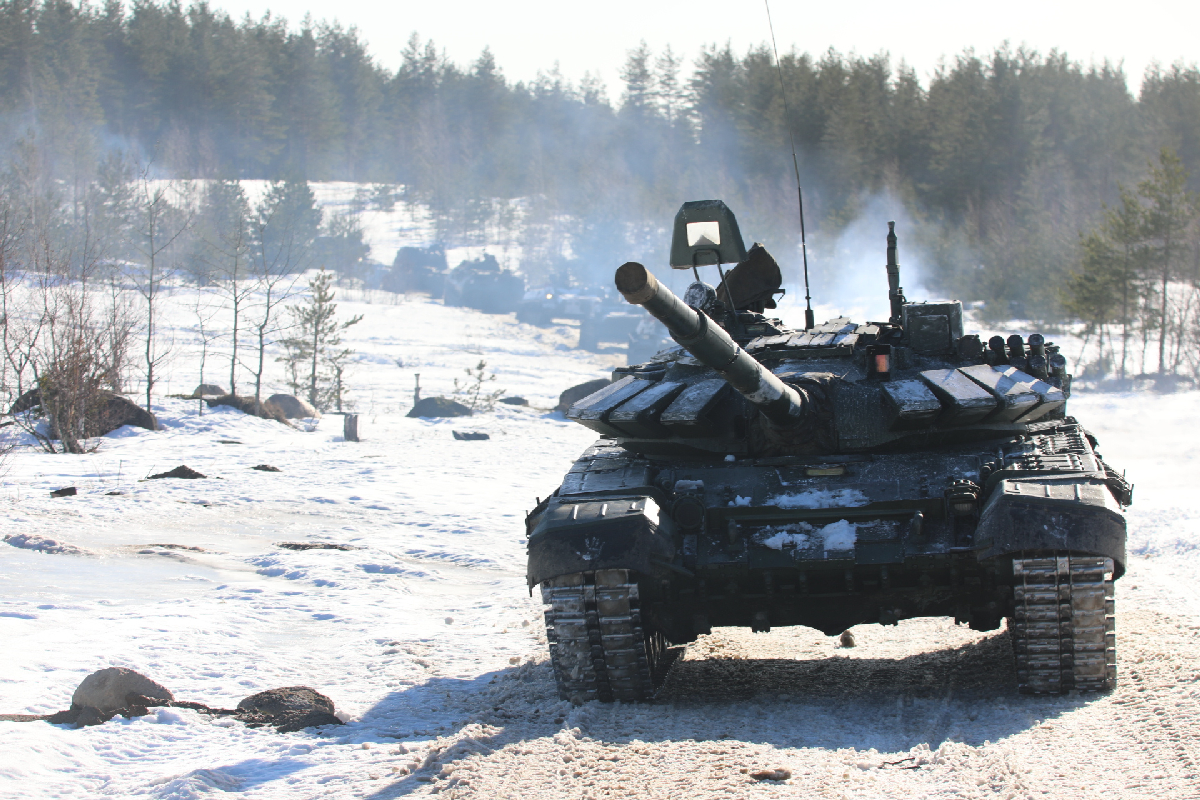

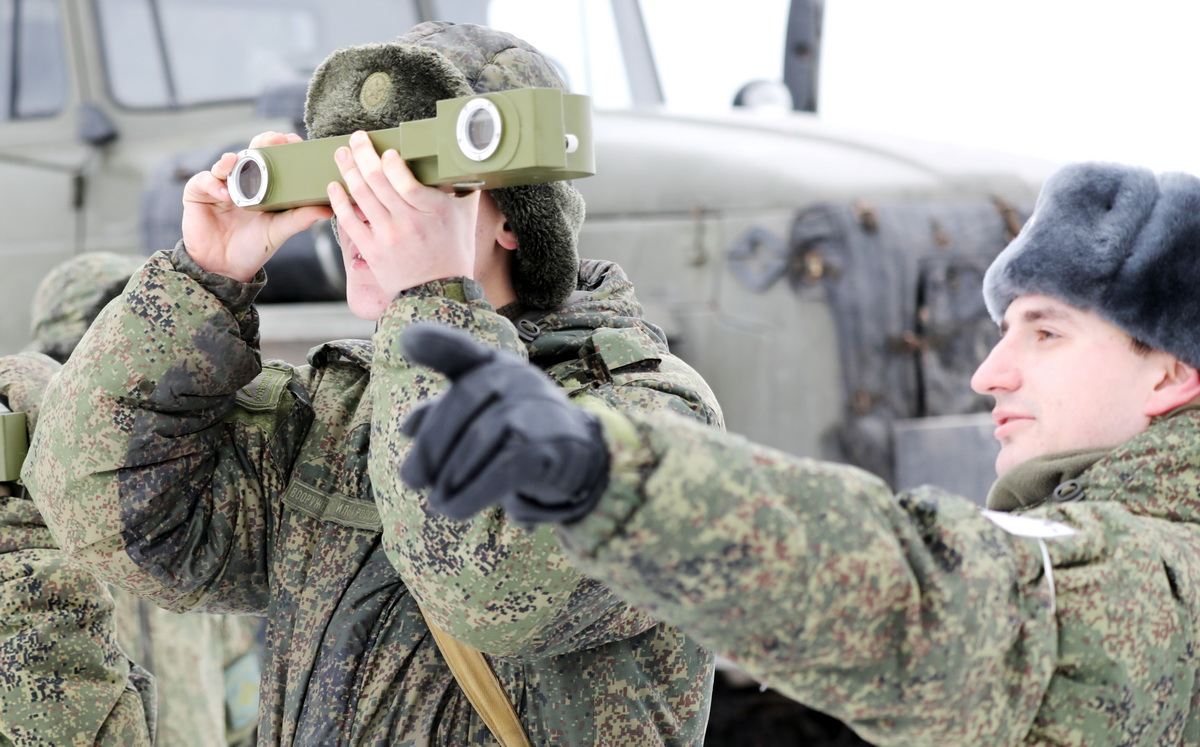

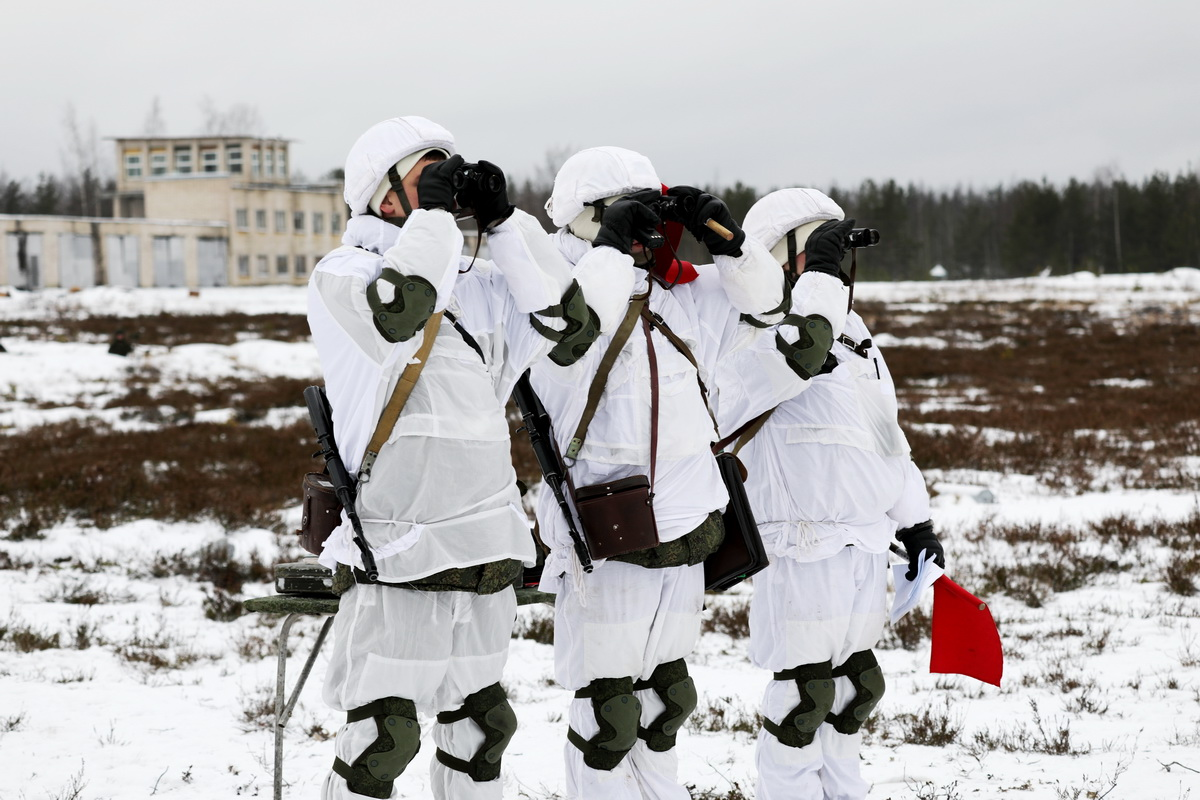

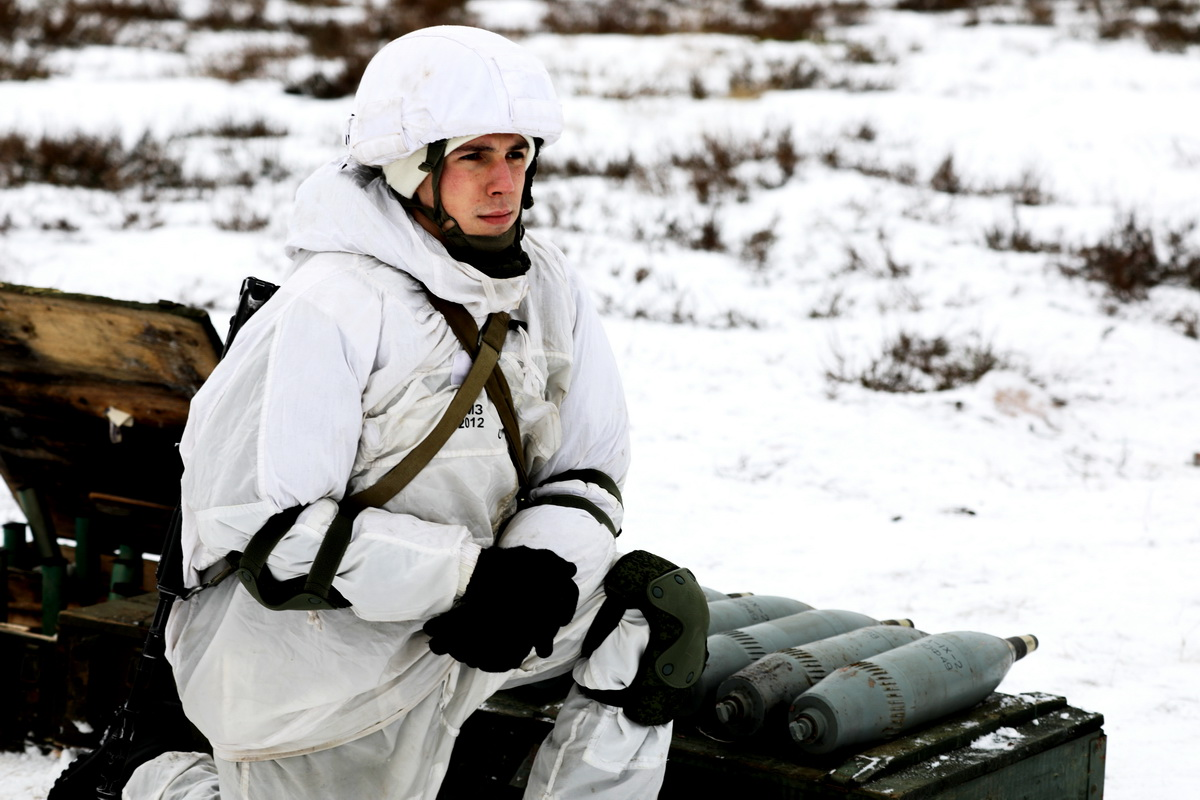

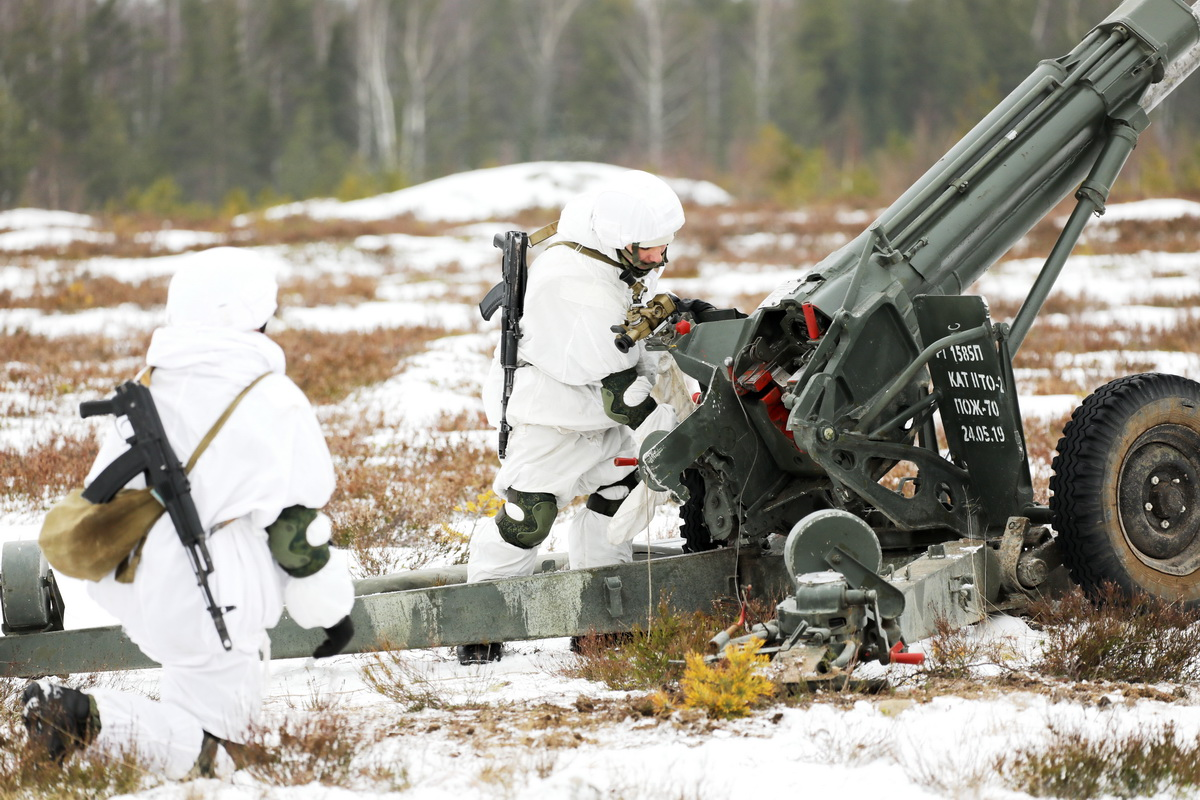

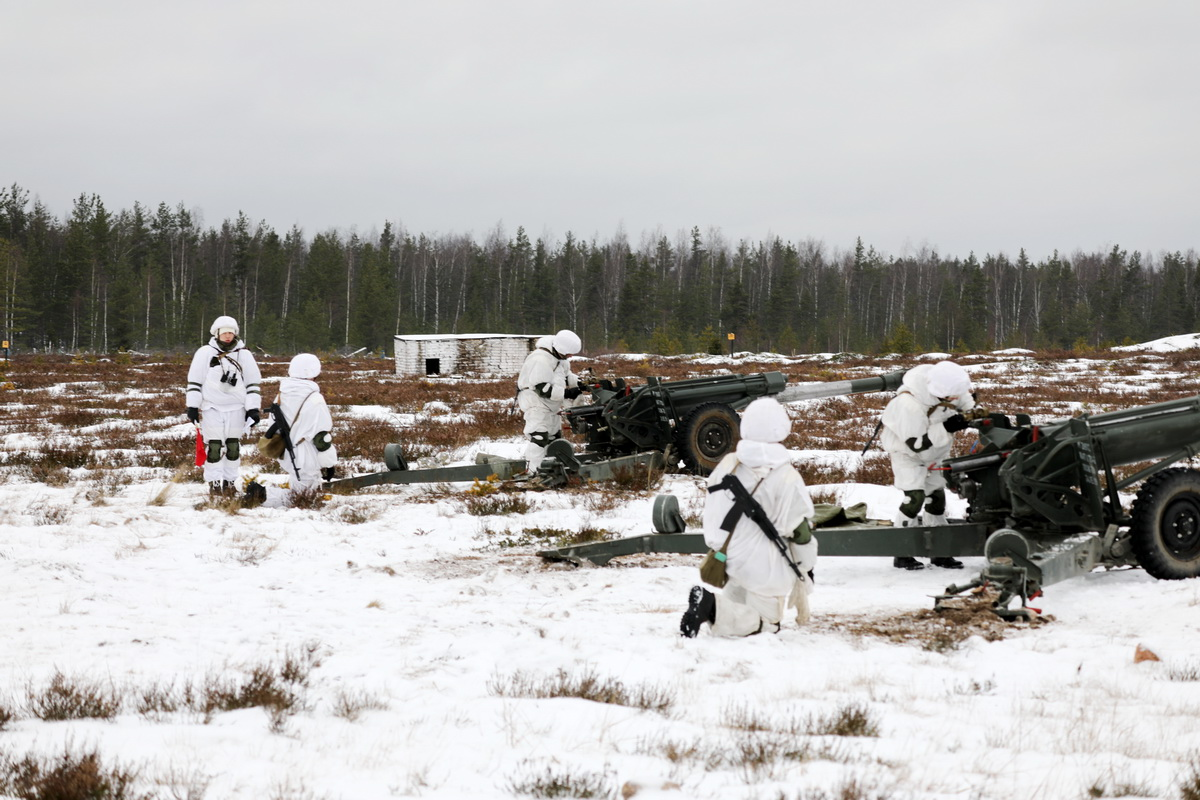

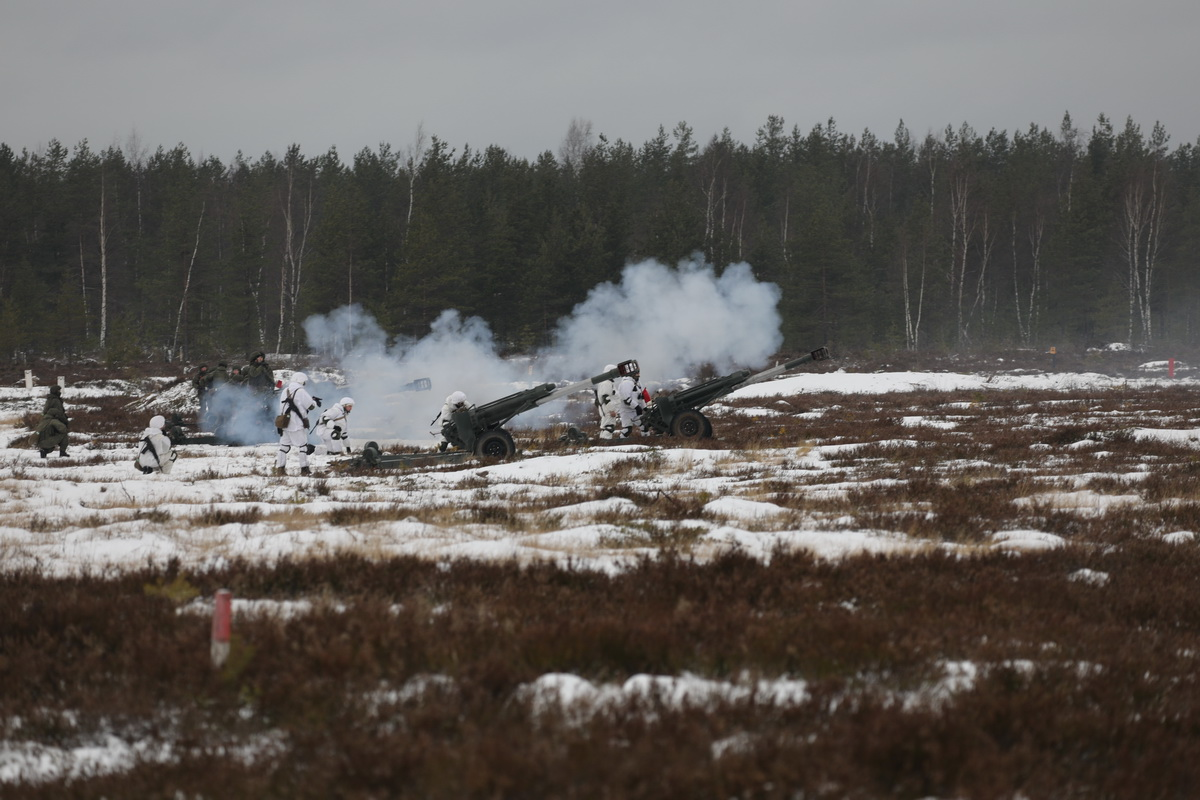

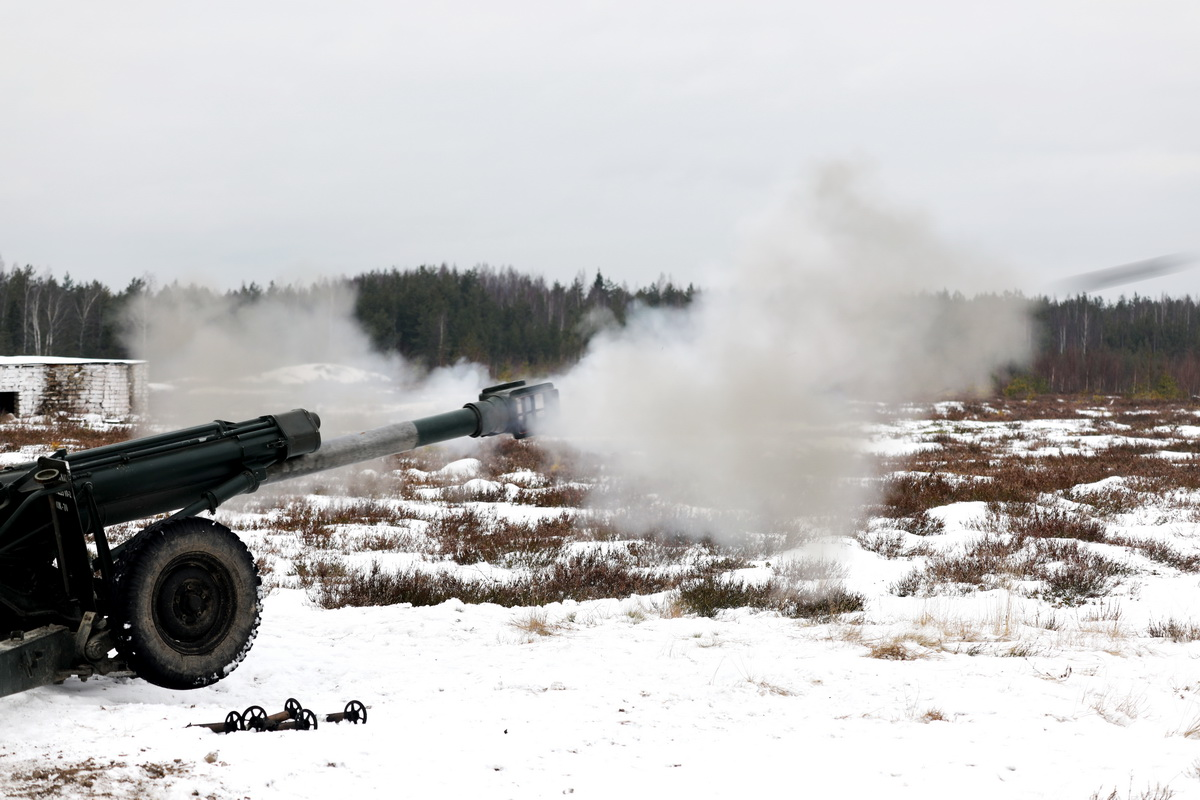

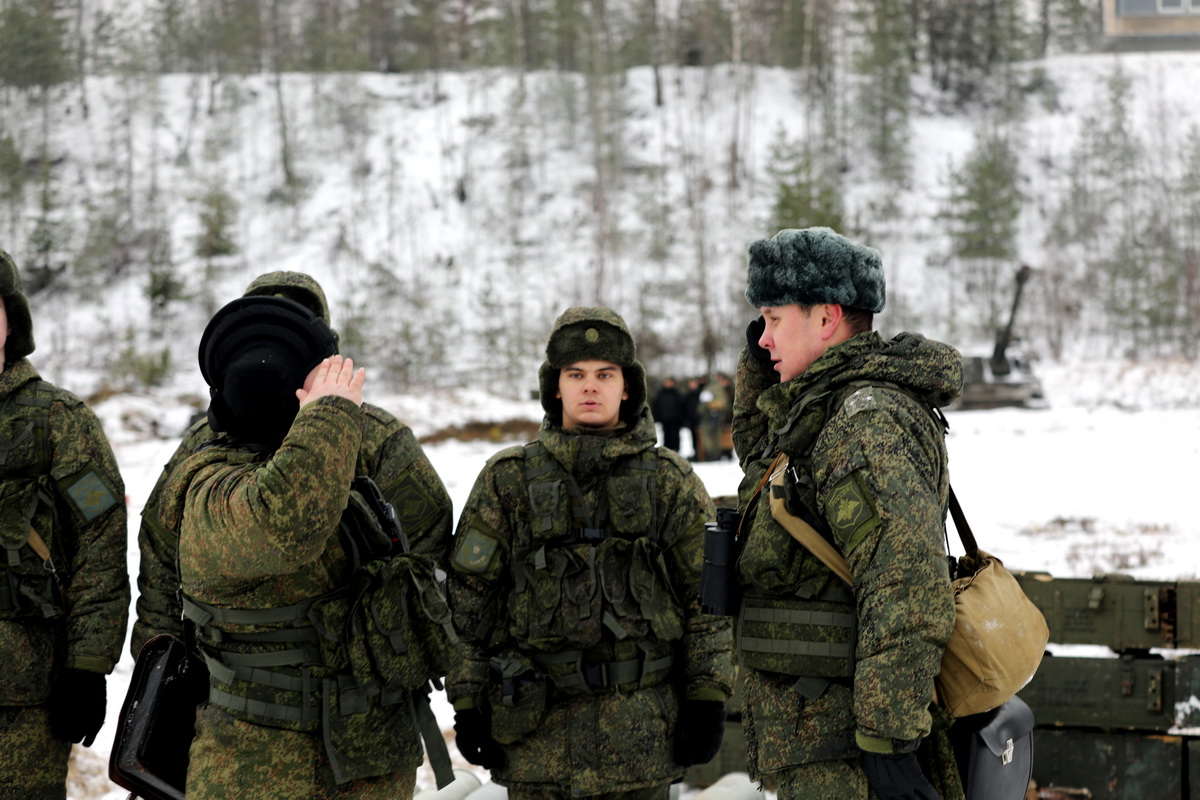

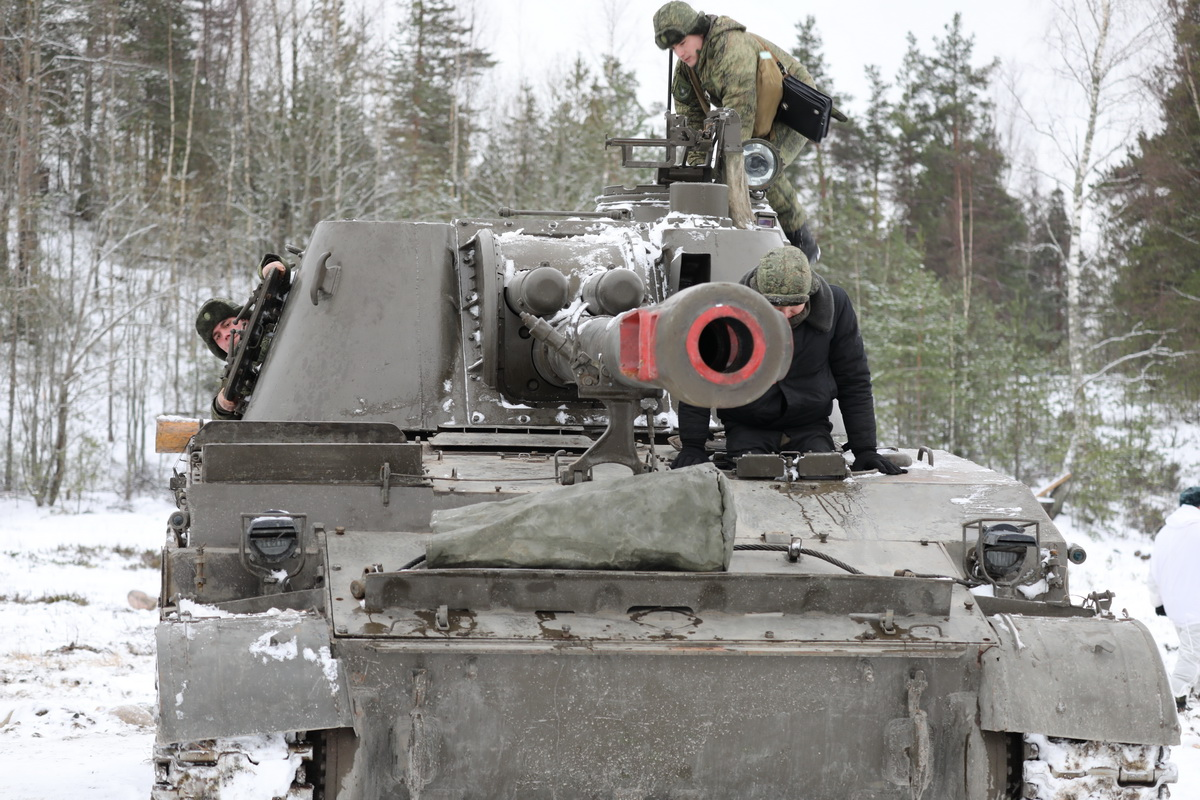

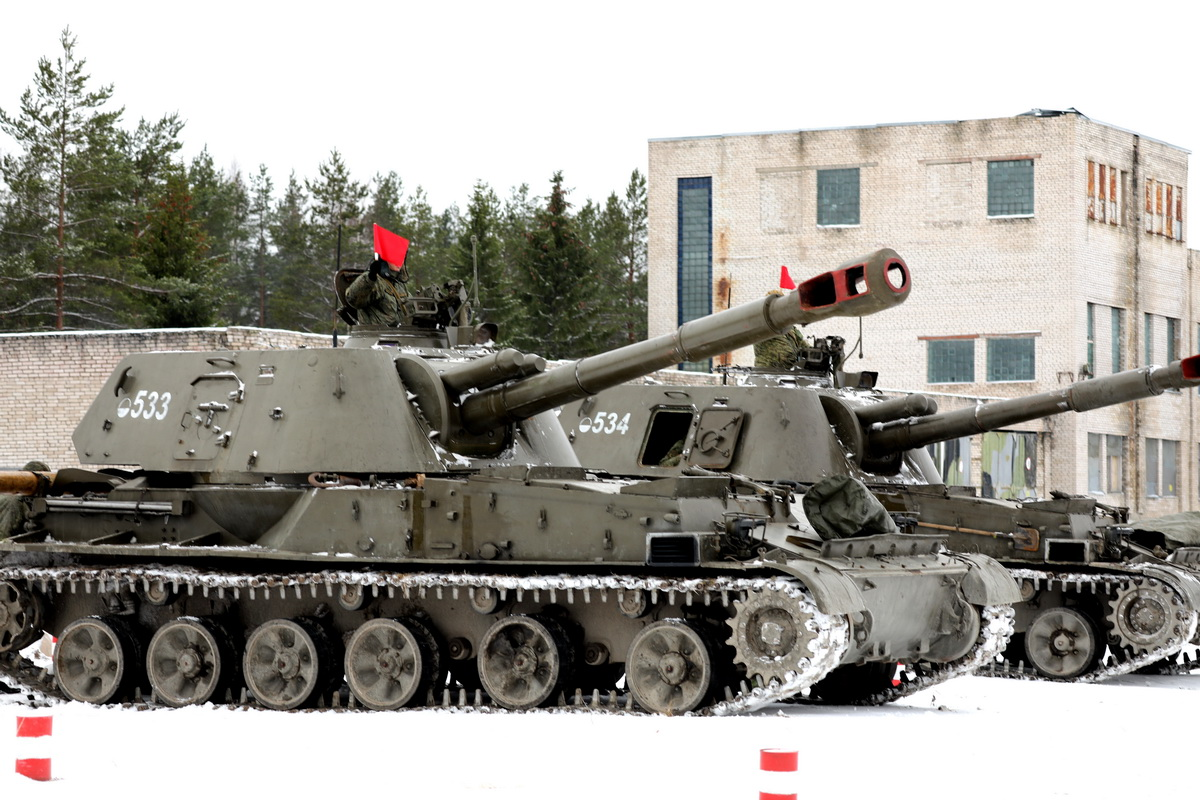

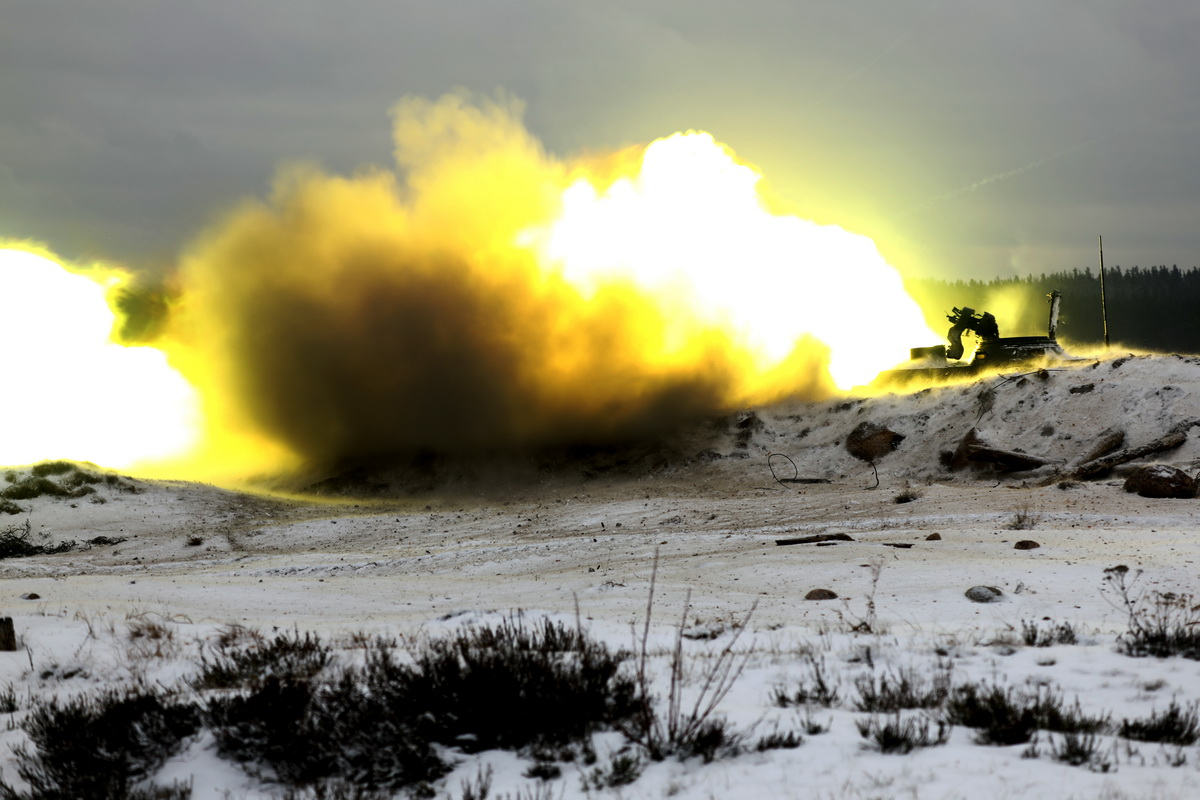

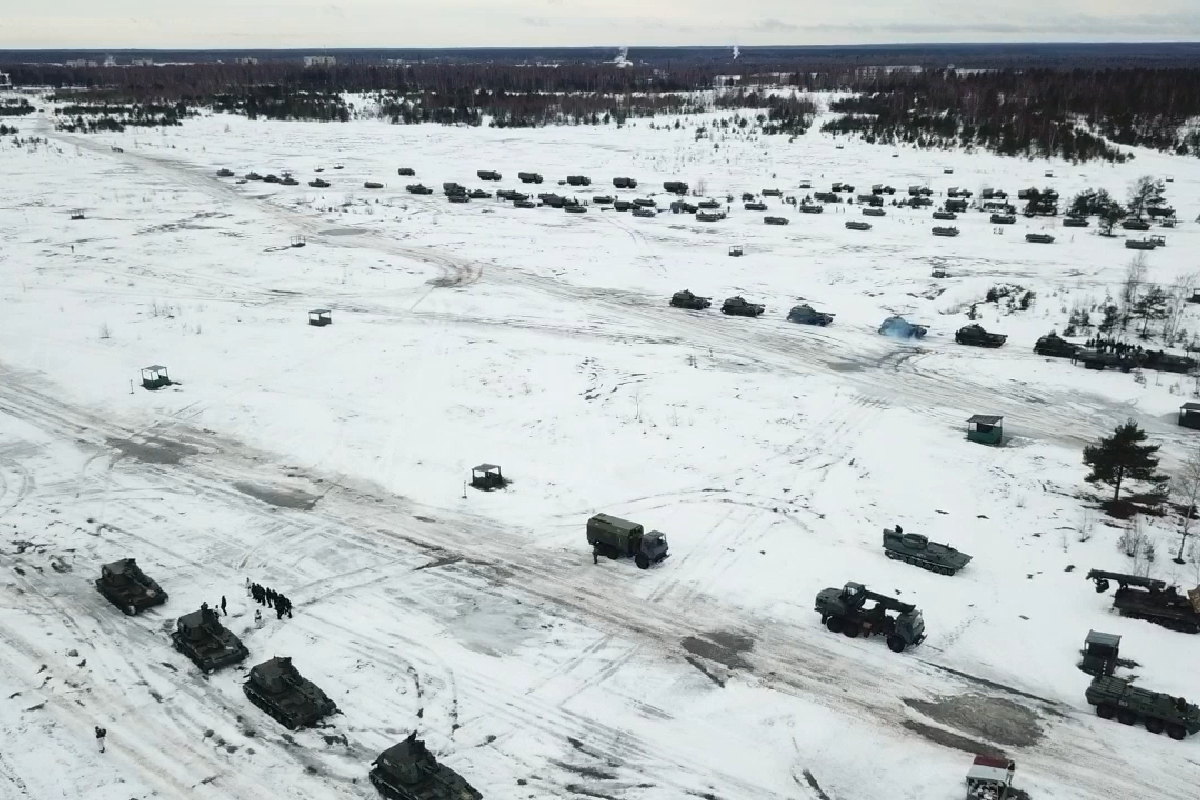
