= 69th Brigade =

69th Brigade may refer to:

== Russia ==
- 69th Covering Brigade (Russia)

== Soviet Union ==
- 69th Brigade NKVD

== United Kingdom ==
- 69th Anti-Aircraft Brigade
- 69th Infantry Brigade (United Kingdom)
- 69th (Howitzer) Brigade, Royal Field Artillery
- 69th (Royal Warwickshire Regiment) Anti-Aircraft Brigade, Royal Artillery

== United States ==
- 69th Air Defense Artillery Brigade (United States)
- 69th Infantry Brigade (United States)

== See also ==
- 69th Division (disambiguation)
- 69th Regiment (disambiguation)
