= 69th Division =

In military terms, 69th Division or 69th Infantry Division may refer to:

== Infantry divisions ==
- 69th Infantry Division (Wehrmacht), Germany in World War II
- 69th Division (Imperial Japanese Army)
- 69th Infantry Division (Russian Empire)
- 69th Guards Motor Rifle Division, Russia
- 69th Guards Rifle Division, Soviet Union
- 69th Mechanized Division, Soviet Union
- 69th Rifle Division, Soviet Union
- 69th (2nd East Anglian) Division, British Army in World War I
- 69th Infantry Division (United States)

== Aviation divisions ==
- 69th Air Division, United States

== Other divisions ==
- 69th Anti-Aircraft Artillery Division, Soviet Union

== See also ==
- List of military divisions by number
- 69th Brigade (disambiguation)
- 69th Regiment (disambiguation)
- 69th Squadron (disambiguation)
