= 69 =

69 most often refers to:

- 69 (number), the natural number following 68 and preceding 70
- A year, primarily 69 BC, AD 69, 1969, or 2069
- 69 (sex position)
- 69 Hesperia, a main-belt asteroid

69 may also refer to:

== Arts and media ==
=== Music ===
- The 69'ers, an Australian rock, pop, jug and country band formed in 1969
- 6ix9ine, also known as Tekashi69, American rapper
- Day69, album by 6ix9ine
- Six/Nine, a 1995 album by Buck-Tick
- 69 (album), 1988, by A.R. Kane
- "69", a song by T-Pain from his 2007 album Epiphany
- "'69", a song by Deep Purple from Abandon
- Major 6 add 9, a jazz chord
- "Summer of '69", a song by Bryan Adams

=== Other media ===
- 69 (novel), by Ryu Murakami
  - 69 (2004 film), a film based on the Murakami novel
- Ruang Talok 69, a 1999 Thai film
- 69 (2025 film), a Sri Lankan Sinhalese drama film

== Other uses ==
- Lake 69, a small lake in the region of Áncash, Peru
- List of highways numbered 69
  - Texas State Highway 112, formerly designated as State Highway 69
- Cancer (astrology) (astrological sign ♋️)
- British Rail Class 69, a class of locomotive converted from the ageing British Rail Class 56
- *69, the Last Call Return feature code in the US and Canada
- 69'ers, a Brooklyn, New York, outlaw motorcycle club

== See also ==
- 69th (disambiguation)
- "34+35", a 2020 song by Ariana Grande
