= List of highways numbered 69A =

The following highways are numbered 69A:

== United States ==
- County Road 69A (Calhoun County, Florida)
  - County Road 69A (Jackson County, Florida)
- Nebraska Recreation Road 69A
- New York State Route 69A
  - County Route 69A (Cayuga County, New York)
- Oklahoma State Highway 69A (two highways)
