= List of highways numbered 69 =

Route 69, or Highway 69, may refer to:

== International ==
- European route E69

== Australia ==
- Appin Road

== Canada ==
- Alberta Highway 69
- Ontario Highway 69

== China ==
- G69 Expressway

== Finland ==
- Finnish national road 69

== Greece ==
- EO69 road

== India ==
- National Highway 69 (India)
- State Highway 69 (Kerala)

== Ireland ==
- N69 road (Ireland)

== Korea, South ==
- Gukjido 69

== New Zealand ==
- New Zealand State Highway 69

== Philippines ==
- N69 highway (Philippines)

== Poland ==
- National road 69 (former, 2000–2016)

== United Kingdom ==
- A69 road
- M69 motorway

== United States ==
- Interstate 69
  - Interstate 69W
  - Interstate 69C
  - Interstate 69E
- U.S. Route 69
- Alabama State Route 69
  - County Route 69 (Lee County, Alabama)
- Arizona State Route 69
  - Arizona State Route 69T (former)
- Arkansas Highway 69
- California State Route 69 (former)
- Colorado State Highway 69
- Connecticut Route 69
- Florida State Road 69
  - County Road 69 (Calhoun County, Florida)
- Georgia State Route 69 (former)
- Idaho State Highway 69
- Illinois Route 69 (former)
- Indiana State Road 69
- Kentucky Route 69
- Louisiana Highway 69
- Maine State Route 69
- Maryland Route 69 (former)
- Massachusetts Route 69 (former)
- M-69 (Michigan highway)
- Minnesota State Highway 69 (former)
  - County Road 69 (Scott County, Minnesota)
- Mississippi Highway 69
- Missouri Route 69 (1922) (former)
- Montana Highway 69
- Nebraska Highway 69
- Nevada State Route 69 (former)
- New Jersey Route 69 (former)
  - County Route 69 (Bergen County, New Jersey)
  - County Route 69 (Ocean County, New Jersey)
- New York State Route 69
  - County Route 69 (Chautauqua County, New York)
  - County Route 69 (Chemung County, New York)
  - County Route 69 (Dutchess County, New York)
  - County Route 69 (Jefferson County, New York)
  - County Route 69 (Orange County, New York)
  - County Route 69 (Rockland County, New York)
  - County Route 69 (Schenectady County, New York)
  - County Route 69 (Suffolk County, New York)
  - County Route 69 (Warren County, New York)
- North Carolina Highway 69
- North Dakota Highway 69 (former)
- Ohio State Route 69 (former)
- Oregon Route 69 (former; never signed)
- Pennsylvania Route 69
- South Carolina Highway 69 (former)
- Tennessee State Route 69
- Texas State Highway 69 (pre-1939) (former)
  - Texas State Highway 69 (1971–1992) (former)
  - Texas State Highway Spur 69
  - Farm to Market Road 69 (Texas)
  - Texas Park Road 69
- Utah State Route 69 (former)
- Virginia State Route 69
- West Virginia Route 69
- Wisconsin Highway 69

Territories

- U.S. Virgin Islands Highway 69

== See also ==
- List of highways numbered 69A
- A69 road

Preceded by 68	Lists of highways 69	Succeeded by 70
