= Kamenka, Vyborgsky District, Leningrad Oblast =

Rural locality in Vyborgsky District, Russia

Coordinates: 60°27′N 29°05′E

Kamenka (Russian: Ка́менка; Finnish: Kaukjärvi) is a rural locality (a logging depot settlement) in Vyborgsky District of Leningrad Oblast, Russia, it is located on the Karelian Isthmus to the west of Kirillovskoye railway station. Population: 8,212 (2010 census); 8,112 (2002 census).

Within the framework of municipal divisions, it is a part of Polyanskoye Rural Settlement (with the administrative center in Polyany) in Vyborgsky Municipal District.

The Nikolayevsky artillery range (now Bobochinsky military tank training range) has been situated to the east of Kamenka since 1913. The 138th Guards Motor Rifle Brigade, formerly the 45th Guards Motor Rifle Division, is located here.

== History ==
From the 1323 Treaty of Nöteborg the area was a part of Sweden, administered first as a part of the Mohla (Muolaa) and since 1445 Nykyrka (Uusikirkko) parish, until the cessation of its parish to Russia in the 1721 Treaty of Nystad alongside the Karelian Isthmus part of the Viborg and Nyslott County. In 1812, the parish was reincorporated to the Grand Duchy of Finland alongside other Old Finland (areas of Finland which Russia had acquired in 1721 and 1743, prior to the transfer of the remaining Finland from Sweden to the Russian Empire as an autonomous realm).

The village was first mentioned in 1348. A church (initially Roman Catholic and since the Swedish Reformation Lutheran) dedicated to Saint Birgitta was built in the village during the Middle Ages. Over time the church began to crumble, and the local peasants would have wanted to build a new church, but the priesthood were reluctant. By 1781 the church was in such a bad shape that it was no longer considered suitable for renovation, and the wooden beams were sold to the peasants. The last (Lutheran) burials were conducted to the adjacent cemetery also in 1781.

An Orthodox church dedicated to Saint Nicholas was built into the village in 1853. It was burnt down during the Winter War. The Orthodox church also had a small cemetery, which is in ruins nowadays.

A sawmill was built on the site of the old Lutheran church in the early 1900s, which caused anger in the locals, as during its construction bones from the old Lutheran cemetery were discovered.

The Nikolayevsky artillery range to the east of the village was founded for the Imperial Russian Army in 1913.

When Finland gained independence in 1917, the village, being a part of the Grand Duchy, became a part of independent Finland.

In 1933 a public school was opened in the village.

Prior to the complete evacuation of inhabitants in 1939 due to the Winter War, there were 159 houses in the village, of which 145 were inhabited.

During the interwar years, the artillery range was known as Perkjärvi artillery range when it was administered by the Finnish Army until the 1940 Moscow Peace Treaty which ceded the Karelian Isthmus to the Soviet Union. During the interwar years, it was the main artillery range of the Finnish Army.

The name Kamenka was assigned by the Soviet Union to the village from 13 January 1949.

A new orthodox church was built in Kamenka in 2001, dedicated to the Saint George.

In 2011 Finnish and Russian archeologists discovered what are supposedly the foundations of the old Lutheran church.
