= 69th Street station =

69th Street station may refer to:

- 69 Street station (Calgary), a light rail station in Calgary, Alberta
- 69th Street station (IRT Flushing Line), a subway station in New York City
- 69th Street station (NJ Transit), in North Bergen, New Jersey
- 69th station, Chicago, Illinois
- 69th Street Transportation Center, an intermodal transit station near Philadelphia, Pennsylvania
