= 69th Regiment =

69th Regiment may refer to:

- 69th (South Lincolnshire) Regiment of Foot, an infantry regiment of the British Army
- 69th Armor Regiment, an armoured unit of the US Army
- 69th Infantry Regiment (United States), an infantry unit of the US Army
- 69th Infantry Regiment (New York), an infantry unit of the US Army

American Civil war

- 69th Illinois Volunteer Infantry Regiment, Union Army
- 69th Indiana Infantry Regiment, Union Army
- 69th Ohio Infantry, Union Army
- 69th Pennsylvania Infantry, Union Army

== See also ==
- 69th Division (disambiguation)
