= Aleksandr Lapin (general) =

Russian general (born 1964)

- Александр Павлович Лапин
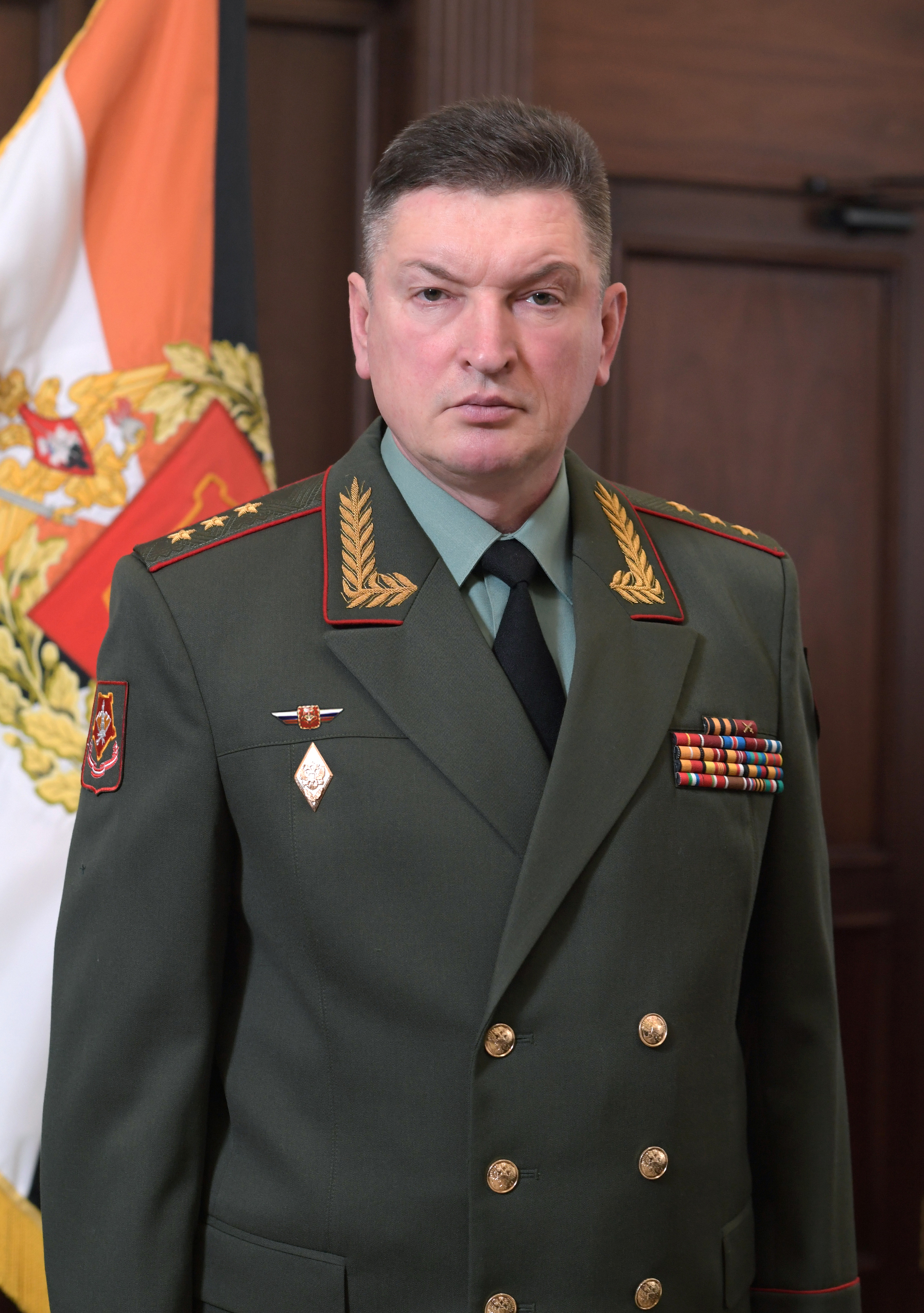
- Official portrait of Lapin in 2019
- Born: Aleksandr Pavlovich Lapin; 1 January 1964 (age 62); Kazan, Russian SFSR, Soviet Union
- Military career
- Allegiance: Soviet Union (to 1991); Russia
- Branch: Soviet Army; Russian Ground Forces
- Service years: 1982–2025
- Rank: Colonel General
- Commands: Leningrad Military District; Central Military District; Eastern Military District
- Conflicts: Russian intervention in the Syrian civil war; Russo-Ukrainian war; 2022 Kharkiv counteroffensive
- Awards: Hero of the Russian Federation (2022)

Colonel General Aleksandr Pavlovich Lapin (Note: Russian: Александр Павлович Лапин) (born 1 January 1964) is a Russian retired military officer who last served as commander of the restored Leningrad Military District from 2024 to 2025. He was previously the chief of staff and first deputy commander-in-chief of the Russian Ground Forces from 2023 to 2024, and commander of the Central Military District from 2017 to 2022.

He was the commander of the Army Groups "Center" and "North" of the Russian Army Forces in the Russian invasion of Ukraine. On 10 January 2023, he was appointed Chief of Staff of the Russian Ground Forces.

== Biography ==
=== Early life and career ===
Lapin was born on 1 January 1964. After graduating from high school, he studied at the Kazan Chemical–Technological Institute from 1981 to 1982. From 1982 to 1984 he served in the ranks of the Soviet Army in the Soviet Air Defense Forces. After that, he entered the Kazan Higher Tank Command School named after the Presidium of the Supreme Soviet of the Tatar Autonomous Soviet Socialist Republic, from which he graduated in 1988. After graduation, he served as commander of a tank platoon and tank company in the Leningrad Military District and in the Coastal Forces of the Northern Fleet.

In 1997, he graduated from the Malinovsky Military Armored Forces Academy. After graduation, he served in the 58th Combined Arms Army as the commander of a separate tank battalion. Since 1999, Lapin was the chief of staff, commander of the 429th Motor Rifle Regiment of the 19th Motor Rifle Division. From 2001 to 2003, he became the Chief of Staff of the 20th Guards Motorized Rifle Carpathian-Berlin Division.

=== General Staff (2003-2020) ===
From 2003 to 2006, Lapin became the commander of the 205th Motorized Rifle Cossack Brigade and promoted to major general. From 2006 to 2007, he was the commander of the 20th Guards Motor Rifle Division.

In 2009, he graduated from the Military Academy of the General Staff of the Russian Armed Forces. After graduating from the academy, he was deputy commander of the 58th Army.

From April 2012 to July 2014, Lapin commanded the 20th Guards Combined Arms Army.

==== Deputy Commander, Eastern (2014-2017) ====
In 2014, he was awarded the military rank of Lieutenant General. From 2014 to 2017, he was the Chief of Staff - First Deputy Commander of the Eastern Military District.

In 2017, Lapin became the chief of staff of the grouping of the Russian troops and forces in Syria. He was promoted to colonel general in 2019. From September to November 2017, Lapin was the Head of the Combined Arms Academy of the Armed Forces of the Russian Federation.

==== Commander, Central (2017-2019) ====
Lapin was the commander of the Central Military District from 22 November 2017.

==== Commander, Syria ====
From October 2018 to January 2019, he was the commander of the grouping of the Russian troops and forces in Syria.

=== Highest Staff (2020-present) ===
In 2020, he graduated from the faculty of retraining and advanced training of the highest command personnel of the Military Academy of the General Staff.

==== Invasion of Ukraine ====
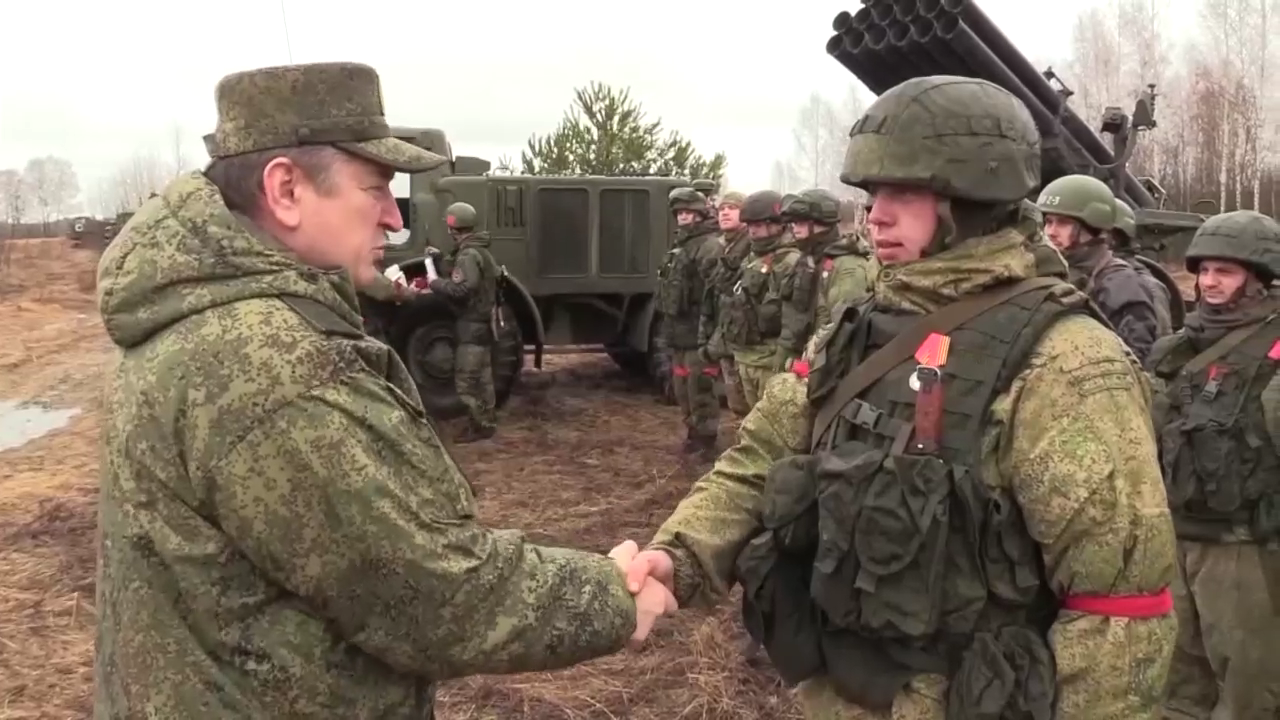
Lapin awards medals to troops who participated in the invasion of Ukraine, April 2022

In June 2022 it was revealed that he was the commander of the Army Group "Center" of the Russian Army Forces in the Russian invasion of Ukraine. In late March, he visited the front line and awarded a medal to his son, the commander fighting in Sumy and Chernihiv, just before the Russian army withdrew.

An investigation by NPR alleged that troops under Lapin's command had killed civilians in Nova Basan and Bobrovytsia during the first months of the invasion and suggested that Lapin could be prosecuted for war crimes under the doctrine of command responsibility if the killings were sufficiently widespread.

Following the October 2022 recapture of Lyman by Ukrainian forces, Lapin was heavily criticized by the head of the Chechen Republic, Ramzan Kadyrov. Kadyrov blamed Lapin for the Russian retreat, saying he would demote Lapin to the rank of private, strip him of his medals, and send him to the front line barefoot with a light machine gun to "wipe away his shame with blood". The Kremlin told Kadyrov to "set aside emotions" during the "special military operation". On 29 October, Lapin was dismissed as commander from the Central Military District, replaced by Alexander Linkov.

==== Chief of Staff of the Russian Ground Forces ====
On 10 January 2023 Russian media reported that Lapin had been assigned to the post of chief of staff of the Russian Ground Forces. In March 2024, he was appointed commander of the troops of the newly created Leningrad Military District and the "North" group of forces in Ukraine.

In the months leading up to the August 2024 Ukrainian incursion into Kursk, Lapin dismantled a border guard council that had been responsible for its protection. In August 2025, due to "deteriorating health" and "his own will", he was removed from his post as commander of the "North" group of forces and replaced by Colonel General Yevgeny Nikiforov. On 21 August 2025, the Russian Defense Ministry confirmed the removal of Lapin from the post of commander of the group of forces "North".

RBK Group has reported that Lapin was retired from military service and replaced by Colonel General Yevgeny Nikiforov as commander of the Leningrad Military District.

=== Civilian government ===
On 28 September 2026, Lapin was appointed as deputy prime minister of Tatarstan for regional policy supporting war veterans and their families.

== Awards ==
- Hero of the Russian Federation
- Order of St. George IV degree (2017)
- Order "For Merit to the Fatherland"
- Order of Alexander Nevsky
- Order of Courage
- Order of Military Merit
- Medal of the Order "For Merit to the Fatherland"
- Medal "For military distinction"
- Medal "To the participant of the military operation in Syria";
- Medal "For action in Palmyra"
- Combat Commonwealth Medal (Syria)

== Personal life ==
He is married and has a son, Lt. Colonel Denis Aleksandrovich Lapin, commanding officer of the 1st Guards Tank Regiment.

On 15 March 2022, against the background of the Russian invasion of Ukraine, Lapin was placed on the UK sanctions list as being responsible for the deployment of Russian troops involved in the attack on Ukraine.

On 5 May, he is listed on Canada's sanctions list for "complicity in President Putin's choice to invade a peaceful and sovereign country." On October 19, 2022, he fell under the sanctions of Ukraine as "involved in the aggression against Ukraine.". For similar reasons, he is on the sanctions lists of Australia and New Zealand.

== Notes ==
Military offices
Preceded by Sergey Istrakov	Commander of the 205th Separate Motor Rifle Brigade; 2003–2006	Succeeded by Konstantin Kastornov
Preceded by Sergey Istrakov	Commander of the 20th Guards Motor Rifle Division; 2006–2007	Succeeded by Gennady Zhidko
Preceded by Sergey Yudin	Commander of the 20th Guards Combined Arms Army; 2012–2014	Succeeded by Aleksandr Chaiko
Preceded by Vladimir Zarudnitsky	Commander of the Central Military District; 2017–2022	Succeeded by Aleksandr Linkov
Preceded by Sergey Kuralenko	Commander of the Group of Forces in the Syrian Arab Republic; 2018–2019	Succeeded by Sergey Surovikin
Preceded by Alexei Kim	Chief of the Main Staff and First Deputy Commander-in-Chief of the Russian Ground Forces; 2023–2024	Succeeded by Rustam Muradov
District re-established	Commander of the Leningrad Military District; 2024–2025	Succeeded by Yevgeny Nikiforov
