= Vladimir Zarudnitsky =

Russian general (born 1958)

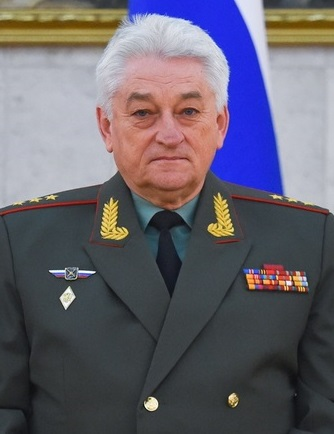
- Portrait, 2023
- Native name: Владимир Борисович Зарудницкий
- Born: 6 February 1958 (age 68); Abinsk, Krasnodar Krai, Soviet Union
- Allegiance: Soviet Union (to 1991); Russia
- Branch: Soviet Army; Russian Ground Forces
- Service years: 1975–present
- Rank: Colonel General
- Commands: Russian General Staff Academy; Central Military District; Main Operational Directorate; 36th Army; 27th Guards Motor Rifle Division
- Conflicts: Second Chechen War
- Awards: Order "For Merit to the Fatherland"; Order of Military Merit
- Alma mater: Ordzhonikidze Higher Combined Arms Command School; Frunze Military Academy; Russian General Staff Academy

Colonel General Vladimir Borisovich Zarudnitsky (Note: Russian: Владимир Борисович Зарудницкий) (born 6 February 1958) is a Russian military officer who has served as the director of the Russian General Staff Academy since 2017. He was heavily involved in the Second Chechen War and the insurgency in the North Caucasus, becoming the commander of the forces in Chechnya in 2007. He was the chief of the Main Operational Directorate of the General Staff from 2011 to 2014, and commander of the Central Military District from 2014 to 2017.

== Early life and career ==
Zarudnitsky was born on 6 February 1958 in Abinsk. After entering the military in 1975, he graduated from the Ordzhonikidze Higher Military Command School in 1979. Between 1979 and 1985, he commanded a platoon and then a company in the Group of Soviet Forces in Germany. Between 1985 and 1987, he was head of an intelligence regiment in the GSFG. In 1989, Zarudnitsky graduated from the Frunze Military Academy.

Zarudnitsky served in the Soviet Army from the 1970s and became a junior officer in the Group of Soviet Forces in Germany, commanding a platoon, company, and intelligence regiment. After his 1989 graduating from the Frunze Military Academy, Zarudnitsky became chief of staff of a regiment and a regimental commander in the Far Eastern Military District. He then served as chief of staff and commander of a motor rifle brigade in the North Caucasus Military District.

== Senior military career ==
From 1991 to 1994, Zarudnitsky served as chief of staff of a regiment and later commanded a regiment in the Far Eastern Military District. In 1997, Zarudnitsky became chief of staff of the 131st Motor Rifle Brigade at Maykop. He took command of the brigade in 1999, leading it in the Second Chechen War.

Zarudnitsky entered the Military Academy of the General Staff of the Armed Forces of Russia, graduating in 2003 with honors. He became commander of the 27th Guards Motor Rifle Division in the Volga–Urals Military District. In January 2005, he became chief of staff and first deputy commander of the 36th Army in the Siberian Military District. In February 2007, he became commander of the army.

In April 2009, Zarudnitsky became chief of staff and first deputy commander of the Moscow Military District.

In March 2011, he became deputy commander of the Southern Military District. On 3 October, he became head of the Main Operational Directorate and deputy chief of the General Staff of the Armed Forces of the Russian Federation.

On 10 December 2013, Zarudnitsky was awarded the Order of Military Merit.

In June 2014, he became commander of the Central Military District.

On 22 November 2017, he was appointed chief of the Military Academy of the General Staff of the Armed Forces of Russia.

== Personal life ==
Zarudnitsky is married and has a son and a daughter.

== Notes ==
Military offices
Preceded by Vladimir Chirkin	Commander of the 36th Army; 2007–2009	Succeeded by Vladimir Tsilko
Preceded by Viktor Shemetov	Chief of Staff and First Deputy Commander of the Moscow Military District; 2009–2010	District abolished
Preceded by Andrey Tretyak	Chief of the Main Operational Directorate of the General Staff of the Russian Armed Forces; 2011–2014	Succeeded by Andrey Kartapolov
Preceded by Nikolai Bogdanovsky	Commander of the Central Military District; 2014–2017	Succeeded by Aleksandr Lapin
Preceded by Sergey Kuralenko	Director of the Military Academy of the General Staff of the Armed Forces of Russia; 2017–present	Incumbent
