= 103rd Rocket Brigade =

103rd Rocket Red Banner, orders of Kutuzov and Bogdan Khmelnitsky brigade
- 103-я ракетная Краснознамённая, орденов Кутузова и Богдана Хмельницкого бригада
- Active: December 17, 1942 — present
- Country: Soviet Union; Russian Federation
- Branch: Russian Ground Forces
- Type: Theatre rocket brigade
- Part of: 36th Combined Arms Army
- Garrison/HQ: Divizionnaya (ru:Дивизионная_(Улан-Удэ)), in Ulan-Ude, Buryatia
- Equipment: 9K720 Iskander ballistic missile
- Decorations: Order of the Red Banner Order of Kutuzov (2nd class, for military unit) Order of Bogdan Khmelnytsky (2nd class)

The 103rd Rocket Red Banner, Orders of Kutuzov and Bohdan Khmelnytskyi Brigade (103 RBr), is a tactical surface-to-surface missile formation of the Ground Forces of the Russian Federation. Its Military Unit Number is 47130. It is equipped with the 9K720 Iskander tactical ballistic missile.

== History ==
It traces its history to the creation of the 12th Breakthrough Artillery Division (Russian: 12-я артиллерийская дивизия прорыва) of the Reserve of the High Command in December 1942. The formation of the division began in the fall of 1942. It was created from November 1942 in the Chebarkul camp in the Chelyabinsk Oblast. The division's formation ended on December 17. On December 31, 1942, the division went to the front. December 15, 1942 was considered the day the division was formed, when Colonel Kurkovsky took command of the division.

The 12th Breakthrough Artillery Division included the 32nd Howitzer, 41st Cannon, 46th Light, 89th Heavy Howitzer, and 104th Heavy Howitzer Brigades, the 11th Mortar Brigade, the 819th Separate Reconnaissance Artillery Divizion (battalion), and smaller units. The division was part of the Western, Belarusian, 2nd and 1st Belorussian Fronts. During World War II fifteen personnel of the division became Heroes of the Soviet Union. The division was at the front (part of the "operational army") from 31 December 1942 — 13 April 1944, 14 June 1944 — 9 May 1945. The first battle of the division took place on January 26-31, 1943. It helped in breaking through the defenses of the Wehrmacht advancing on the Kastornensky direction at the junction of the Bryansk and Voronezh Fronts. The fire made it possible to crush the enemy and help the 182nd, 8th, 15th and 307th Rifle Divisions advance. From 10 July 1944 to 31 July 1944 the division served with the 8th Guards Army. It ended the war in 1st Belorussian Front, with two brigades supporting 5th Shock Army, but most of the remainder of the division supporting 69th Army.

In August 1960 the division was reorganized as the 103rd Rocket Brigade stationed in the Transbaikal Military District as part of the 29th Combined Arms Army. Other sources trace its immediate existence to its formation at Nizhinernyy in Gorky Oblast, Moscow Military District, in August 1960. It was initially assigned to the 13th Guards Army Corps.

From 1979 the brigade was located at Divizionnaya ([51 54 25N, 107 33 19E], ru:Дивизионная_(Улан-Удэ)), a suburb of Ulan-Ude in the Buryat Autonomous Soviet Socialist Republic.

On January 15, 2012, the brigade received a new type of battle flag. Before the award ceremony, a ceremony was held to attach the banner to the staff, which took place at the Russian Drama Theatre. The battle flag was traditionally fastened with gilded nails.

The brigade's home base is at Divizionnaya in Ulan-Ude; it is part of the 36th Combined Arms Army. It is participating in the Russian invasion of Ukraine. As part of the 36th Army, alongside the 5th Guards Tank and 37th Guards Motor Rifle Brigades, it was first deployed to Belarus and then participated in active operations, mainly in the area west of Kyiv.

The brigade is equipped with 9K720 Iskander surface to surface missiles. The new missile had first been introduced into service in 2006, and by 2010, the brigade was one of five to operate the Iskander. Previously, the brigade was armed with the OTR-21 Tochka surface to surface missile.
