= Vitaly Gerasimov =

Russian military officer

- Виталий Петрович Герасимов
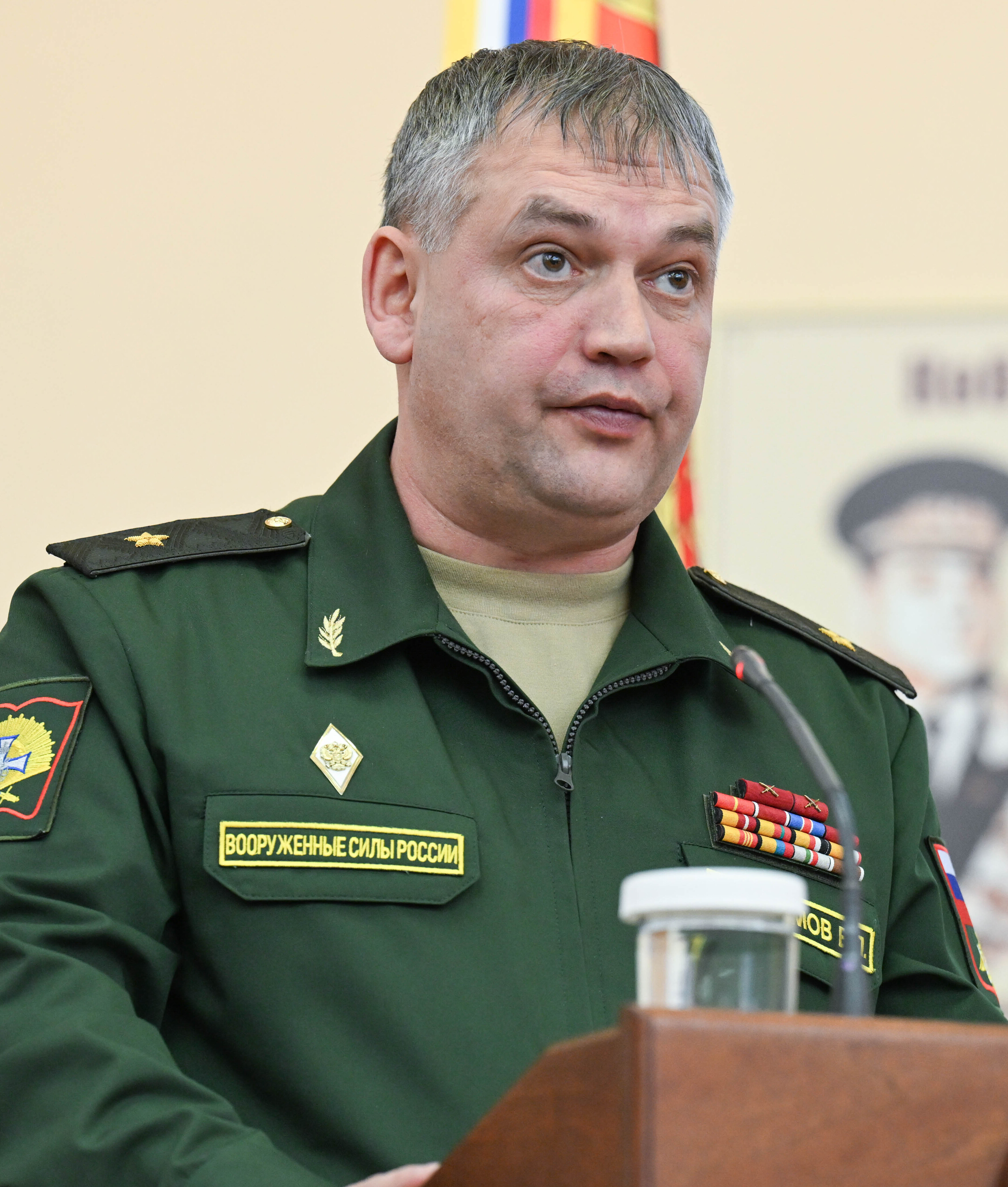
- Gerasimov in 2026
- Born: Vitaly Pyetrovich Gerasimov; 9 July 1977 (age 49); Kazan, Tatar ASSR, Soviet Union
- Military career
- Allegiance: Russia
- Branch: Russian Ground Forces
- Service years: 1995–present
- Rank: Major general
- Commands: 36th Guards Combined Arms Army
- Conflicts: Second Chechen War; Syrian Civil War; Russo-Ukrainian War; Annexation of Crimea; Russian invasion of Ukraine; Battle of Kharkiv

Vitaly Petrovich Gerasimov (Russian: Виталий Петрович Герасимов; born 9 July 1977) is a Russian Ground Forces major general (one-star rank), the chief of staff and first deputy commander of the 41st Combined Arms Army.

On 7 March 2022, Ukraine's Ministry of Defence announced that Gerasimov was killed in Kharkiv Oblast during the Russian invasion of Ukraine, but Gerasimov was confirmed to be alive by BBC Russian when he was awarded the Order of Alexander Nevsky on 23 May 2022.

== Early life and education ==
Vitaly Petrovich Gerasimov was born on 9 July 1977 in Kazan. Gerasimov graduated from the Kazan Higher Tank Command School in 1999 and from the Combined Arms Academy of the Armed Forces of the Russian Federation in 2007.

== Military career ==
Gerasimov fought in the Second Chechen War (1999–2000). From 2007 to 2010, he commanded a motor-rifle battalion in the North Caucasus Military District. In October 2013, as a colonel, he was assigned as commander of the 15th Separate Motor Rifle Brigade (Peacekeeping).

He was awarded campaign medals for participating in the Russian annexation of Crimea in 2014, and the Russian military operation in Syria (from 2015). In June 2016, he was promoted to the rank of major-general.

Gerasimov was claimed by Ukrainian authorities to have been killed during the Russian invasion of Ukraine on 7 March 2022 near Kharkiv, along with several other senior Russian officials. The Ukrainian defence ministry offered no proof, and US officials and CNN were not able to verify the claim. The Netherlands-based open-source intelligence (OSINT) fact-checking group Bellingcat said it had confirmed the death by accessing a Ukrainian intercept of Russian communications, as well as by means of "a Russian source". The Guardian newspaper reported on 8 March that the Ukrainian defence department "broadcast what it claimed was a conversation between two Russian FSB officers discussing the death and complaining that their secure communications were no longer functioning inside Ukraine". Gerasimov was later seen alive when he was awarded the Order of Alexander Nevsky on 23 May. He was later appointed commander of the 36th Combined Arms Army of the Eastern Military District. On 10 June 2024, he was introduced to the head of Tatarstan, Rustam Minnikhanov, as the new commander of the Higher Tank Command School in Kazan.

== See also ==
- List of Russian generals killed during the Russian invasion of Ukraine
