= Georgij Alafuzoff =

Finnish military intelligence officer (born 1953)

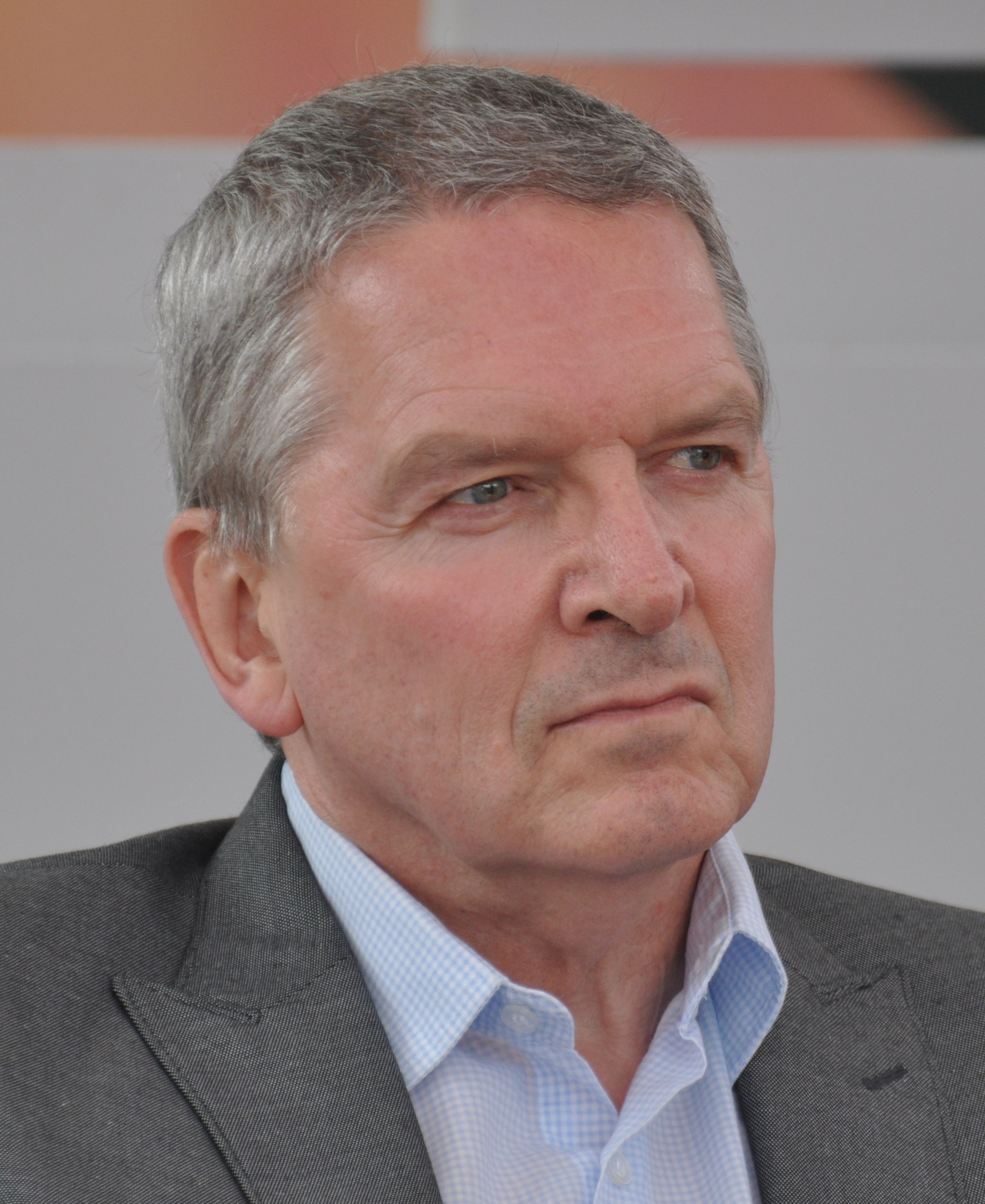
- Born: 15 September 1953 (age 73); Helsinki, Finland
- Military career
- Allegiance: Finland
- Branch: Finnish Navy
- Service years: 1973–2016
- Rank: Counter admiral
- Commands: Chief, Finnish Military Intelligence Service

Georgij Alafuzoff (Russian: Гео́ргий Борисович Алафу́зофф, romanized: Georgy Borisovich Alafuzoff; born 15 September 1953) is a Finnish former military intelligence officer, who has served, among others, as Chief of Finnish Military Intelligence Service from 2007 to 2013, as well as Director of the Intelligence Directorate of the European Union Military Staff from 2013 to 2016.

A graduate of Finnish National Defence University, Alafuzoff has also held top leadership roles in a variety of commands, including as Chief of Joint Implementation Commission, KFOR, Kosovo; Liaison Officer, USCENTCOM, Tampa, Florida; and Assistant Chief of Staff, J2, EUFOR RD Congo.

== Biography ==
He was born on 15 September 1953 in Helsinki into a Russian-Swedish family: his father is a descendant of Baron Ivan Alafuzoff, who emigrated from St. Petersburg to Finland, and his mother is from a family of Finnish Swedes.

In the 1950s, he was baptized in the Orthodox Church and studied at a Finnish-Russian school in Helsinki, after which he passed the university entrance exams. Assuming to continue his education in the humanities, he entered the University of Helsinki at the faculty of Russian language. He began his military service on 2 May 1973, and after completing his service in the town of Utti (near Kouvola), he entered to the officers' school in Hamina. In 1974 he was promoted to lieutenant, and in 1977 he graduated from the Naval Academy.

== Naval career ==
From 1977 to 1981, he taught at the naval school, where in 1979 he was promoted to senior lieutenant. In the early 80s, he returned to the Naval Academy, and by 1985, was promoted to captain. From 1987 to 1989, he studied at the high school for officers. In 1997, he studied at the Russian Academy of the General Staff, from which he graduated with honors. From 2007 to April 2013, he headed the military intelligence of the Finnish Defense Forces. On 17 December 2012 he was appointed head of the military intelligence of the European Union. On 6 December 2014 he was awarded the rank of Counter Admiral.

=== Misuse of classified information ===
In July 2019, the media reported that Alafuzoff was suspected of disclosing classified information about military intelligence, including those concerning Russia, in December 2017.

In February 2024, the Helsinki Court of Appeal found Alafuzoff guilty of gross service offence (törkeä palvelurikos), sentencing him to 1 year and 6 months, suspended. The case was heard by the Court of Appeal as a court of first instance due to his high military rank.

The prosecution was not content with the sentence and appealed to the Supreme Court, which in June 2025 increased the term to 1 year and 10 months, and converted it to a custodial sentence.

Because the sentence term is less than two years, Alafuzoff was entitled to retain his rank.

== Personal life ==
He has two children with his wife who he is currently divorced from. He has a son named Alexander (born 1987), who graduated from the Helsinki University of Technology with a degree in automation and technological systems. He also has a daughter named Anna-Maria (born 1991). He is fluent in Finnish, Russian and Swedish as his native languages, and also speaks English and Polish.
