= Sergey Kuralenko =

Russian military leader

- Сергей Васильевич Кураленко
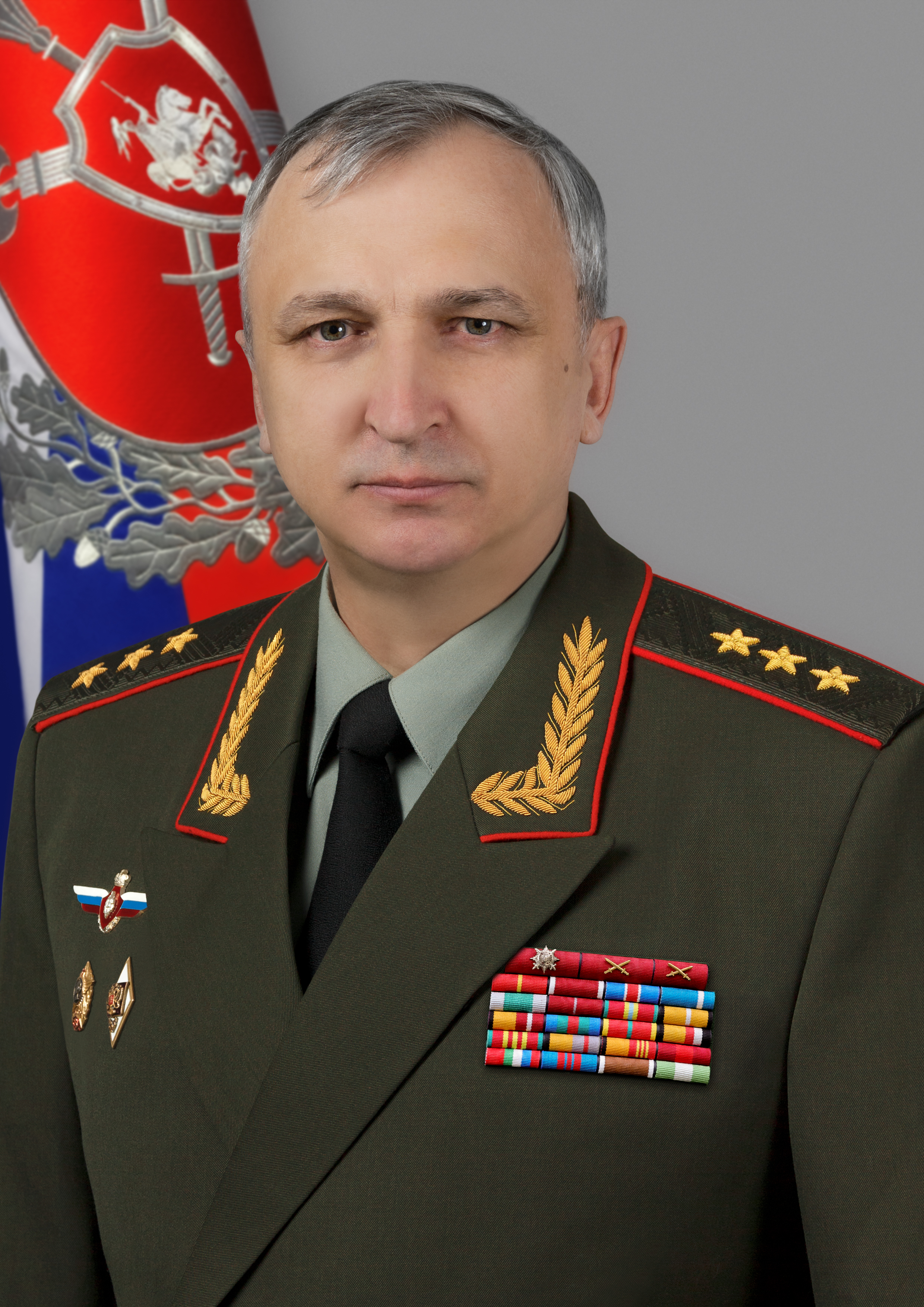
- Official portrait, 2016
- Born: Sergey Vasilievich Kuralenko; 21 December 1961 (age 64); Rathenow, Bezirk Potsdam, East Germany
- Education: Ussuriysk Suvorov Military School; Kharkov Higher Command Armored School; Malinovsky Armored Forces Academy; General Staff Academy
- Military career
- Allegiance: Soviet Union (1979–1991); Russia (since 1991)
- Branch: Soviet Army; Russian Ground Forces
- Service years: 1979–present
- Rank: Colonel general
- Commands: Main Directorate of the Military Police; Military Academy of the General Staff of the Armed Forces of Russia; Russian Reconciliation Center for Syria; 6th Combined Arms Army; 4th Guards Tank Division
- Conflicts: Second Chechen War; Syrian Civil War; Russo-Ukrainian War

Sergey Vasilyevich Kuralenko (Russian: Серге́й Васи́льевич Курале́нко; born 21 December 1961) is a Russian Ground Forces colonel general serving as the Head of the Main Directorate of Military Police of the Ministry of Defense of Russia since 2020.

== Early life ==
Sergei Vasilyevich Kuralenko was born in Rathenow, East Germany, on December 21, 1961, into a military family.

== Military career ==
In 1979, he graduated from Ussuriysk Suvorov Military School. From 1979 to 1983, cadets attended Kharkov Guards High Command Tank School, located in Kharkiv, Ukraine. After graduation, he joined the GSVG and served as a tank platoon commander, deputy tank company commander, and tank company commander. From 1988 until 1992, he served as tank company commander, deputy tank battalion commander, and tank battalion commander in the 14th Guards Combined Arms Army's Odessa military district. From May 2012 to May 2013, he served as Head of the Department of Military Art at the Military Academy of the General Staff of the Russian Armed Forces. He was the Commander of the Western Military District's 6th Combined Arms Army from May 2013 until December 2015. On December 13, 2014, he was promoted to lieutenant general via presidential decree. From February to May 2016, he served as the head of the Russian Defense Ministry's Coordination Center for the Reconciliation of Warring Parties in Syria, based at Khmeimim Air Base. He served as the Head of the Military Academy of the General Staff of the Russian Federation's Armed Forces from September 16, 2016, to November 2017.

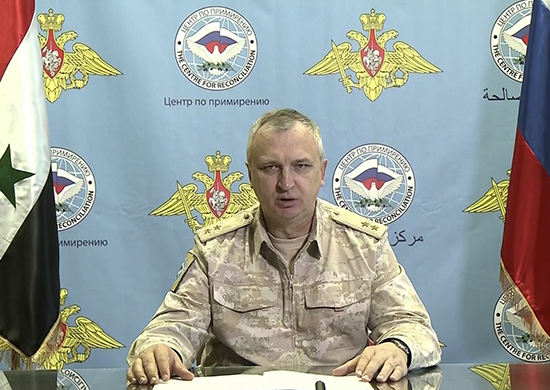
Sergey Kuralenko as the Head of the Coordination Center for the Reconciliation of Warring Parties on the Territory of the Syrian Arab Republic

He served as the Deputy Commander of Russian soldiers in Syria from August to September 2017, then as Commander from September to October 2018.

On February 21, 2020, Vladimir Putin issued decree No. 146, appointing him to the position of Chief of the Main Directorate of Military Police at the Russian Ministry of Defense. Sergey Kuralenko has been accused by The Insider, a Russian investigative media organization, of being aware of coercive measures used to compel Russian servicemen back into war in Ukraine. This includes claimed beatings and attempts to recruit into the Wagner PMC, which is well known for its involvement in many global conflicts. He also holds a top role and appears to be in charge of military actions involving the Russian Armed Forces during the Russian invasion of Ukraine in 2022, according to ACF International.

== Personal life ==
He is married and father of two daughters.

Military offices
Preceded by Alexander Romanchuk	Commander of the 4th Guards Tank Division; 2006–2009	Succeeded by Sergey Nekrasov
Army created	Commander of the 49th Combined Arms Army; 2011–2012	Succeeded by Viktor Astapov
Preceded by Yevgeny Ustinov	Commander of the 6th Combined Arms Army; 2013–2015	Succeeded by Andrey Kuzmenko
Preceded by Sergey Makarov	Director of the Military Academy of the General Staff of the Armed Forces of Russia; 2017–2019	Succeeded by Vladimir Zarudnitsky
Preceded by Vladimir Ivanovsky	Director of the Main Directorate of Military Police; 2020–present	Incumbent
