= 36th Guards Combined Arms Army =

Russian Ground Forces formation

- 36-я гвардейская общевойсковая армия
- Great emblem of the 36th Guards Combined Arms Army
- Active: 1997–Present
- Country: Russia
- Branch: Russian Ground Forces
- Type: Combined Arms
- Size: Army
- Part of: Eastern Military District
- Garrison/HQ: Ulan-Ude
- Engagements: Russo-Ukrainian War; Russian invasion of Ukraine; Northern Ukraine campaign; Battle of Bucha; Battle of Makariv; Eastern Ukraine campaign; 2024 Velyka Novosilka offensive
- Decorations: Guards

Commanders
- Current commander: Major General Grigory Tyurin
- Notable commanders: Alexander Kolmakov; Vladimir Chirkin; Vladimir Zarudnitsky

Insignia
- Patch

The 36th Guards Combined Arms Army is a combined arms (field) army of the Russian Ground Forces, part of the Eastern Military District (MUN 05776).

== History ==
The army was formed in 1997 from the 55th Army Corps at Borzya in the Siberian Military District, which had been formed from the previous Soviet 36th Army. The army participated in exercises "Baikal-2006", "Vostok-2007", and "Vostok-2010". In February 2009, the army headquarters was relocated to Ulan-Ude.

During the Russian invasion of Ukraine, elements of the 36th Army (including units from the 5th Tank Brigade, 37th Motor Rifle Brigade and 103rd Rocket Brigade) had been deployed to Belarus and were participating in active operations, mainly in the area west of Kyiv.

On July 1, 2025, the army was awarded the Guards status. Probably 4.875 members were killed from 2023 until october 2026.

== Units subordinate to 36th Army ==
- 5th Guards Tank Tatsinskaya Red Banner Order of Suvorov Brigade (Ulan Ude, Divisionnaya, MUN 46108)
- 37th Guards Motor Rifle Don Budapest Red Banner Order of the Red Star Brigade (Kyakhta, MUN 69647)
- 30th Artillery Brigade (MUN 62048)
- 103rd Rocket Brigade (Ulan-Ude, MUN 47130)
- 35th Guards Anti-Aircraft Missile Brigade (в/ч 34696)
- 1723rd Anti-Aircraft Rocket Regiment (Jida)
- 26th NBC Protection Regiment (Onokhoy, MUN 62563)
- 75th Headquarters Brigade (Ulan-Ude, MUN 01229)

== Commanders ==
- Lieutenant General Aleksandr Petrovich Kolmakov (August 1998 – July 2000)
- Lieutenant General Hakim Ismagilovich Mirzazyanov (July 2000 – November 2003)
- Lieutenant General Vladimir Valentinovich Chirkin (November 2003 – February 2007)
- Lieutenant General Vladimir Borisovich Zarudnitsky (February 2007 – April 2009)
- Lieutenant General Vladimir Genrikhovich Tsilko (June 2009 – February 2012)
- Lieutenant General Oleg Leontevich Makarevich (February 2012 – February 2013)
- Major/Lieutenant General Mikhail Yurevich Teplinsky (February 2013 – May 2015)
- Major General Dmitry Ivanovich Kovalenko (May 2015 – September 2017)
- Lieutenant General Mikhail Yakovlevich Nosulev (October 2017 – January 2020)
- Major/Lieutenant General Valery Nikolayevich Solodchuk (January 2020 – 2022)
- Major General Vitaly Petrovich Gerasimov (2022 – 2024)
- Major General Grigory Rostislavovich Tyurin (since 2024)
