= Yevgeny Nikiforov =

Russian army officer

- Евгений Валерьевич Никифоров
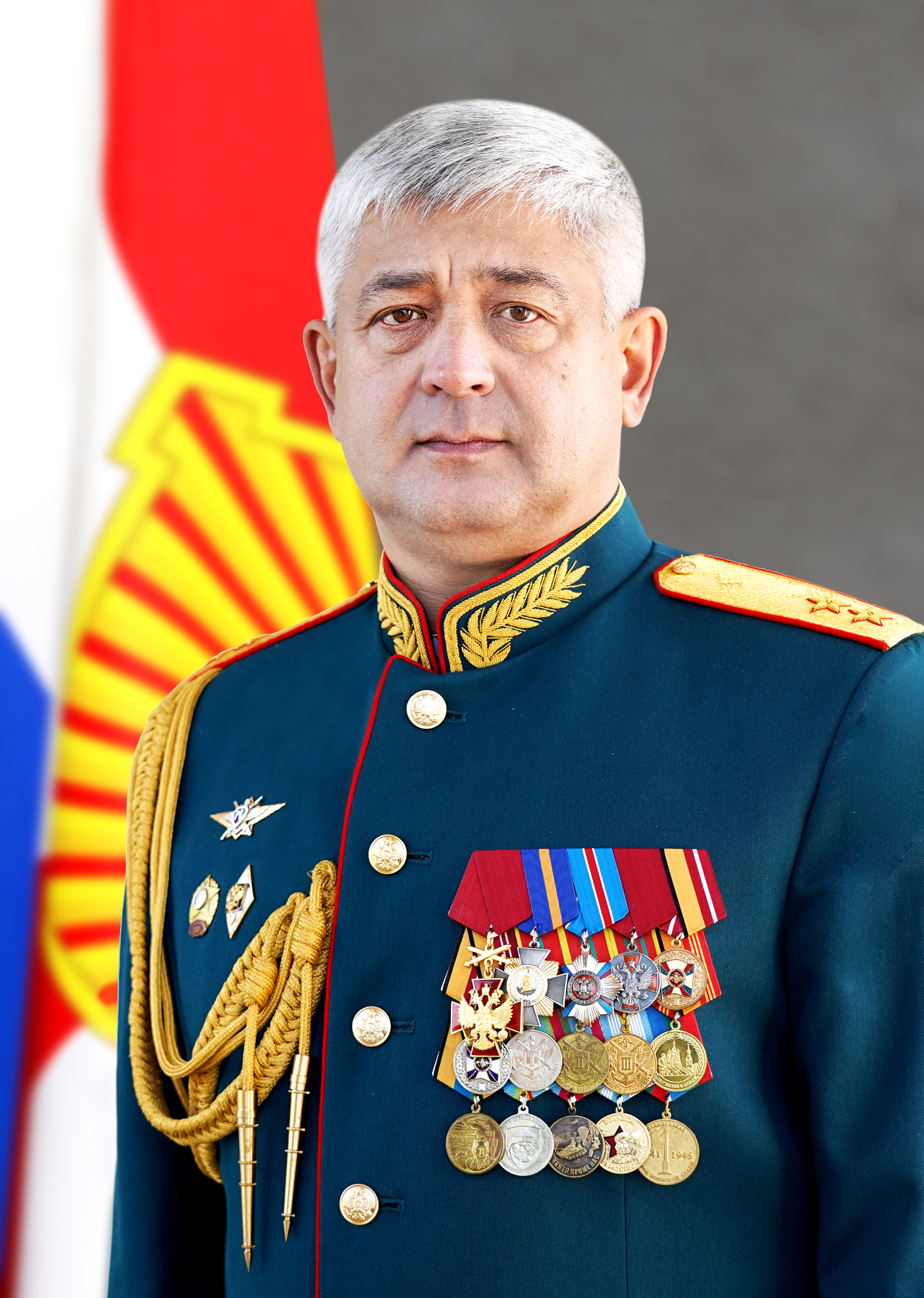
- Born: Yevgeny Valeryevich Nikiforov; 1 January 1970 (age 56); Aksha, Russian SFSR, Soviet Union
- Military career
- Allegiance: Soviet Union; Russia
- Service years: 1987–present
- Rank: Colonel General
- Commands: Leningrad Military District (21 September 2025–); Western Military District (26 December 2022–1 March 2024)

Yevgeny Valeryevich Nikiforov (Russian: Евгений Валерьевич Никифоров; born 1 January 1970) is a Russian military officer who was the commander of the Western Military District between 23 January 2023 and 26 February 2024. He had previously been the Chief of Staff - First Deputy Commander of the Eastern Military District from 2020 to 2023. He has held the rank of colonel general since 17 February 2023. In August 2025, he was appointed as commander of the "North" group of forces in Ukraine, replacing Aleksandr Lapin. On 21 September 2025, he was also appointed as commander of the Leningrad Military District.

Since 14 May 2018, he has been under international sanctions of Ukraine.

== Biography ==
Yevgeny Nikiforov was born on 1 January 1970. In 1987 he graduated from the Ussuriysk Suvorov Military School. After graduating from the Ussuriysk SVU, he entered the faculty of the Airborne Forces at the Kolomna Higher Artillery Command School, after graduating from which in 1991 he joined the Russian Airborne Forces. He then rose through the ranks and postings to senior commands. From 1991 to 1993, he was the commander of the anti-tank platoon of the anti-tank battery of the paratrooper battalion of the airborne brigade. From March to August 1993, he was the deputy commander of the anti-tank battery and instructor of airborne training of the paratrooper battalion of the airborne brigade. From 1993 to 1995, he was a commander of an anti-tank battery of an airborne brigade. From 1995 to 1999, he was the chief of staff of a paratrooper battalion of an airborne brigade. From 1999 to 2001, he was promoted to a commander of a separate paratrooper battalion of an airborne brigade.

From 2001 to 2003 Nikiforov studied at the Combined Arms Academy of the Armed Forces of the Russian Federation. From 2003 to 2005, he was deputy commander of an airborne brigade. From 2005 to 2007, he was the Commander of the 83rd Air Assault Brigade of the Far Eastern Military District. From 2007 to 2009, he was the Commander of the 27th Guards Motor Rifle Division of the Far Eastern Military District. From 2009 to 2010, he was the commander of the 36th Separate Guards Motor Rifle Brigade of the Far Eastern Military District. From 2010 to 2012 he studied at the Military Academy of the General Staff of the Armed Forces of Russia. After graduating from the Academy in 2012, he served as Deputy Commander of the 58th Army of the Southern Military District from 2012 to 2014 and Chief of Staff - Deputy Commander of the 20th Guards Combined Arms Army of the Western Military District 2014 to 2016. On 8 May 2013, by Decree of the President of Russia No. 468, Nikiforov was promoted to Major General.

The Security Service of Ukraine (SBU) claims that Nikiforov was involved in the attack by pro-Russian participants in the armed conflict in Donbas on the Il-76 aircraft of the Ukrainian Air Force, which was shot down on 14 June 2014 in Luhansk. On 22 August 2016, Nikiforov was included by the General Prosecutor's Office of Ukraine in the list of those accused of "crimes against the foundations of Ukraine's national security, peace and international law and order."

From 2016 to 2017, Nikiforov was the Commander of the 20th Guards Army of the Western Military District. Since 2017, he was the Commander of the 58th Combined Arms Army of the Southern Military District. On 16 January 2017, Major General Nikiforov was awarded the standard of the army commander. On 12 December 2018, by Decree of the President of Russia No. 709, he was promoted to Lieutenant General. In February 2019, he was the Deputy Commander of the Western Military District. In February 2020, Nikoforov became the Chief of Staff - First Deputy Commander of the Eastern Military District.

From June to October 2021, Nikforov was the Commander of the Group of Troops (Forces) of the Armed Forces of Russia in Syria. On 12 June 2021, he hosted a parade at Khmeimim Air Base to mark Russia Day.

According to Ukrainian intelligence, on 26 December 2022, Nikiforov has been the commander of the troops of the Western Military District. He officially took office on 23 January 2023.

On this day, we honor our Motherland - a country with a thousand-year history and a unique heritage that united many peoples, territories and cultures in a vast space. The country that we love, that we are proud of and for the sake of which we are ready to sacrifice ourselves.

— Yevgeny Nikoforov

On 30 November 2024, the SBU charged Nikiforov in absentia for ordering the August 2023 Chernihiv missile strike that killed seven people and injured 200 others during the Russian invasion of Ukraine.

== Sanctions ==
By the Decree of the President of Ukraine dated 14 May 2018 under the number 126/2018 (as amended in accordance with the Decree of the President of Ukraine dated 06/21/2018 No. 176/2018) Nikiforov is under international sanctions of Ukraine.

== Family ==
Nikiforov is married and has two children.
