= Vladimir Chirkin =

Russian general (born 1955)

- Владимир Валентинович Чиркин
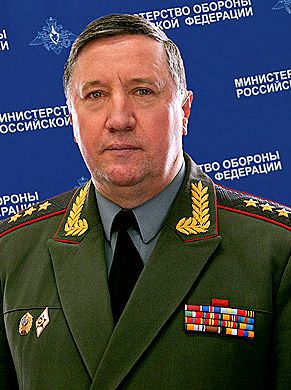
- Chirkin in 2013
- Born: 12 October 1955 (age 71); Khasavyurt, Dagestan ASSR, RSFSR, Soviet Union
- Alma mater: Kazan Suvorov Military School; Frunze Military Academy; General Staff Military Academy
- Military career
- Allegiance: Soviet Union; Russia
- Service years: 1974–2013
- Rank: Colonel General
- Commands: Russian Ground Forces; Siberian Military District; Central Military District

Colonel General Vladimir Valentinovich Chirkin (Russian: Владимир Валентинович Чиркин, born 12 October 1955) is a Russian military officer who served as commander-in-chief of the Russian Ground Forces from 26 April 2012 to 2 December 2013.

== Biography ==
Chirkin studied at the Kazan Suvorov Military School from 1971 to 1974 and the Konev Higher Joint Command School in Alma Ata from 1974–1978. He entered military service in 1978. From 1978 to 1983, he served with Soviet forces in Germany. He also served in the Baltic region, the Russian Far East, and the North Caucasus, eventually as commander of the 36th Combined Arms Army (2003–2007), before becoming deputy commander of the Moscow Military District in 2007. He was Chief of Staff and First Deputy Commander of the Trans-Volga-Ural Military District from December 2008, and Commander of the Siberian Military District from January 2010. He then served as Commander of the Central Military District beginning in December 2010 before being named commander of Ground Forces.

His other military education includes the Frunze Military Academy, from which he graduated in 1988 and the Military Academy of the General Staff of the Armed Forces of Russia which he graduated from in 2000.

== Awards ==
His awards include the Order "For Service Before the Fatherland," Fourth Class (Орден «За заслуги перед Отечеством» IV степени), The Order of Courage (Oрден Мужества), the Order "For Military Merit" («За военные заслуги»), and the Order "For Service to the Motherland in the Armed Forces of the USSR," third class (Орден «За службу Родине в Вооружённых Силах СССР» III степени), as well as other medals.

== Controversies ==
In December 2013, Chirkin was removed as the commander of the Russian Ground Forces by Vladimir Putin for bribery charges. Subsequently (August 2015), he was sentenced to five years in a labor colony. He was also stripped of his military rank of "colonel-general" and most of his state awards. In December 2015, this sentence was cancelled by a higher court.
