= Russian Reconciliation Center for Syria =

Centre for Reconciliation of Opposing Sides and Refugee Migration Monitoring in the Syrian Arab Republic
- Центр по примирению враждующих сторон и контролю за перемещением беженцев в Сирийской Арабской Республике
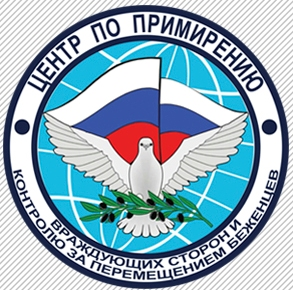
- Emblem of the Russian Reconciliation Center for Syria
- Active: 23 February 2016 – December 2024
- Country: Russia
- Size: 50< servicemen
- Part of: Russian Armed Forces
- Garrison/HQ: Khmeimim Air Base, Latakia
- Engagements: Russian intervention in the Syrian civil war

Commanders
- Notable commanders: Ctr. Adm. Oleg Zhuravlyov; Lt. Gen. Sergey Kuralenko; Lt. Gen. Sergey Chvarkov

The Russian Reconciliation Center for Syria, officially known as the Centre for Reconciliation of Opposing Sides and Refugee Migration Monitoring in the Syrian Arab Republic, founded on 23 February 2016, stated that it was a "peace monitoring center and information office" whose stated aim is to speed the peace negotiations between the Syrian Arab Republic and opposition groups. It was a joint Turkish–Russian government enterprise founded in agreement with the US-led coalition and was headquartered in Khmeimim Air Base, Latakia. It was also reportedly tasked with coordinating humanitarian missions and organizing localities to sign up to ceasefire agreements.

== Humanitarian activities ==
In May 2017, the reconciliation center was able to deliver 4.7 tonnes of humanitarian aid in 10 missions within 24 hours, according to the Russian Ministry of Defence.

== Propaganda activities ==
The reconciliation center has made allegations about what they called "video brigades" carrying out staged filming of made-up scenes after airstrikes, shelling and incidents involving chemical weapons. It has also alleged that "consultants" for the "brigades" were known to locals as Al Jazeera cameramen. Al Jazeera has denied similar claims.
