= Military Academy of the General Staff of the Armed Forces of Russia =

Senior staff college of the Russian Armed Forces

Coordinates: 55°38′59.28″N 37°28′26.37″E

Military Academy of the General Staff of the Armed Forces of the Russian Federation
- Военная академия Генерального штаба Вооружённых сил Российской Федерации
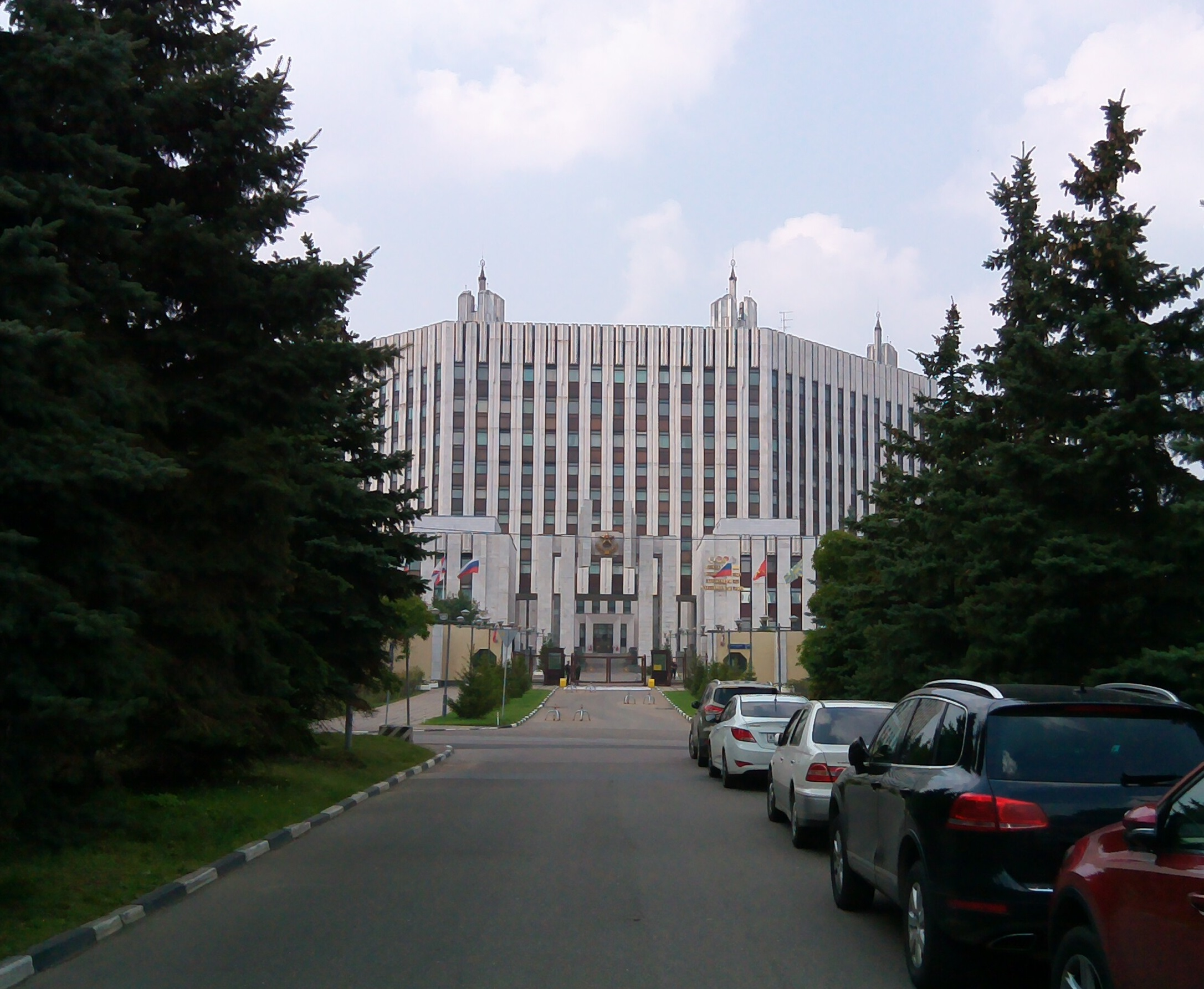
- Academy of the General Staff on Vernadskogo prosp., 100
- Type: Military college
- Established: 1936
- Founder: Red Army
- Director: Vladimir Zarudnitsky
- Location: Vernadskogo Prospekt 100, Moscow, Moscow, Russia
- Website: http://vagsh.mil.ru/

Official banner of the Academy

The Military Academy of the General Staff of the Armed Forces of the Russian Federation (Russian: Военная академия Генерального штаба Вооруженных сил Российской Федерации, romanized: Voyennaya akademia Generalnogo shtaba Vooruzhennykh sil Rossiyskoy Federatsii) is the senior staff college of the Russian Armed Forces.

The academy is located in Moscow, on 14 Kholzunova Lane. It was founded in 1936 as a Soviet institution, based on higher command courses that had been established at the M. V. Frunze Military Academy, itself founded in 1918. An earlier General Staff Academy had existed during the Imperial period, since 1832.

Students were, and probably still are, admitted to the Academy in the ranks of lieutenant colonel, colonel, and General-Major (one star). Most were colonels or newly promoted generals. Officers enter in their late 30s, as a general rule. Officers selected for this academy would have first attended the appropriate service or branch academy (see Military academies in Russia). Graduates who were not already generals or admirals usually were promoted to this rank a short time after completing the course. Length of the academy was only two years, in contrast to the three years for the branch and service academies.

Faculty and students of the General Staff Academy were involved in debates over Soviet military restructuring in the last years of the USSR. They became associated with the military reform efforts of Major Vladimir Lopatin and made specific suggestions for deep force reductions.

As of 22 November 2017, Colonel General Vladimir Zarudnitsky has been the chief of the academy.

== History ==
=== Precursors ===
The existence of a general staff academy for the Russian military dates back to the Imperial period, with the founding of the Imperial Military Academy in Saint Petersburg in 1832, and its official opening on 8 December [O.S. 26 November] 1832. In 1855 the academy was renamed the Nikolaev Academy of the General Staff, commemorating Emperor Nicholas I, who had died that year. Further renamings followed, to the Nikolaev Military Academy in 1909, the Imperial Nikolaev Military Academy in 1910, and back to the Nikolaev Military Academy in 1917. Following the Russian Revolutions, the Nikolaev Military Academy functioned in support of the White Army, being evacuated to territory held by Admiral Alexander Kolchak. With the defeat of the White cause in the Russian Civil War, the academy ceased to exist in 1921, with its final graduation held in Vladivostok at the end of that year.

In the meantime a new academy had been established by the Red Army, in light of its early experiences during the first stages of the Civil War, which had demonstrated the inadvisability of entrusting battlefield commands to former workers and soldiers who had little experience of tactics or of leading men. On 7 October 1918 the Revolutionary Military Council ordered the foundation of the General Staff Academy of the Red Army, based in Moscow. The first intake of students, who joined on 25 November that year, numbered 183, with the official opening of the academy taking place on 8 December 1918. In August 1921 this became the Military Academy of the Red Army, with the focus on training personnel in tactical warfare. Additional nine-month courses were established to provide operational-strategic command training, termed the Higher Military Academic Courses, which from 1931 became one-year-long courses as part of the academy's Faculty of Operations. These courses became the basis of the creation of a new General Staff of the Soviet Armed Forces, and in 1936 a new staff college was created, split from the M. V. Frunze Military Academy, as the Military Academy of the Red Army had been known since 1925.

=== Soviet General Staff Academy ===
The academy trained large numbers of senior commanders and staff officers prior to, and during, the Second World War. From 1941 it became the K. E. Voroshilov Military Academy of the General Staff of the Red Army, and in April 1942 it was named the K. Е. Voroshilov Higher Military Academy, and in 1958 the Military Academy of the General Staff of the Armed Forces of the USSR. It became the K. E. Voroshilov Military Academy of the General Staff of the Soviet Armed Forces in 1969.

=== Russian General Staff Academy ===
With the dissolution of the Soviet Union in 1991, the academy became part of the Russian Armed Forces, and since 1992 has been the Military Academy of the General Staff of the Armed Forces of Russia.

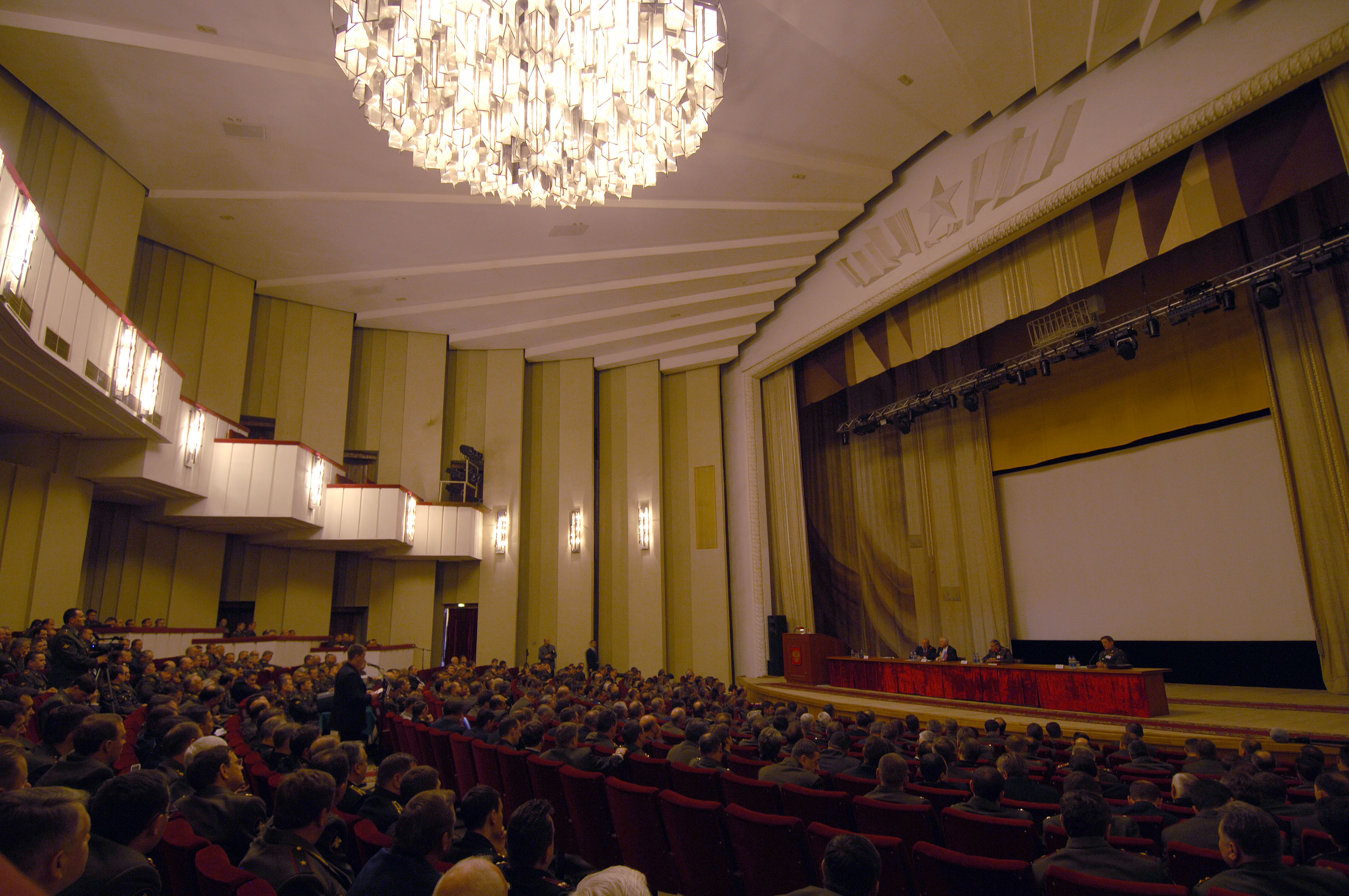
Assembly hall of the academy

Graduate badge until 1992

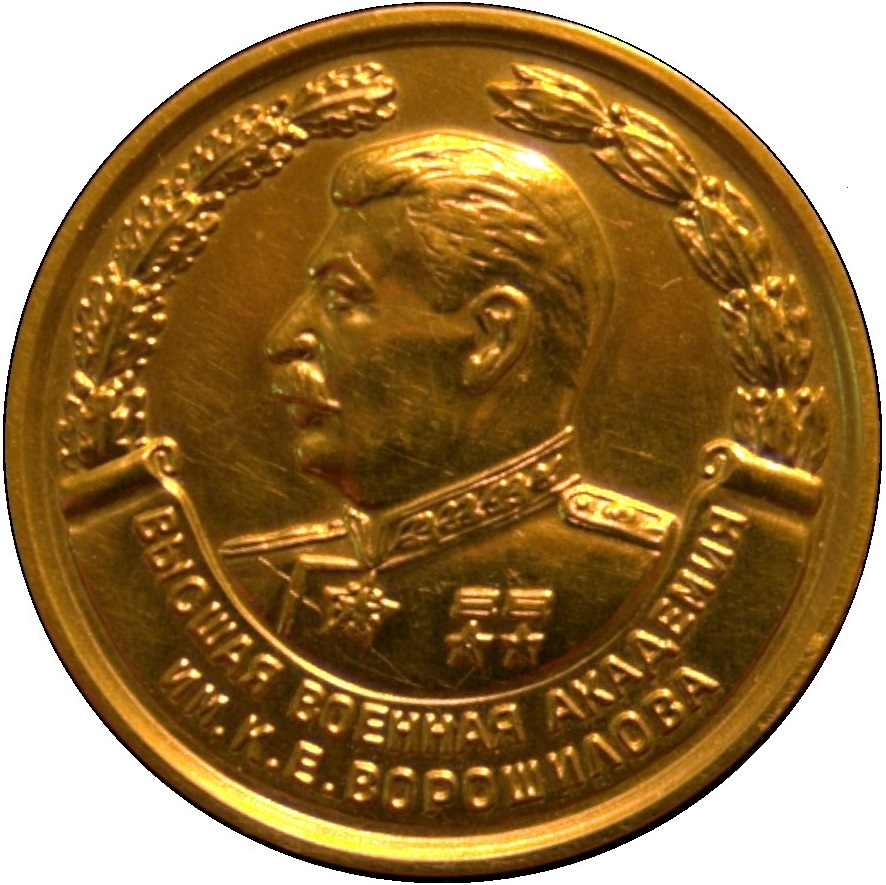
Gold medal for the excellent graduates 1950

== Awards ==
- Order of Kutuzov (2015)
- Order of Lenin (1968)
- Order of the Red Banner (1986)
- Order of Suvorov I degree (1945)
- Order of the Red Banner (Czechoslovakia, 1967)
- Scharnhorst Order (GDR, 1969)
- Order of the Banner of Work (Poland, 1973)
- Order of the People's Republic of Bulgaria (NRB, 1974)
- Order of the Red Banner (Hungarian People's Republic, 1975)
- Order of Sukhbaatar (Mongolian People's Republic, 1976)
- Order of Antonio Maceo (Cuba, 1982)
- Order of Ho Chi Minh (Vietnam, 1986)

== Notable faculty ==
- Fyodor Kuznetsov – Commandant of the Academy (1942–1943), Colonel General
- Matvei Zakharov – Commandant of the Academy (1945–1949 & 1963–1964), Marshal of the Soviet Union
- Dmitry Karbyshev – Doctor of Military Sciences, professor
- Gregory Lavrik – Doctor of Military Sciences, professor.
- Valentin Rog – Doctor of Military Sciences, professor, Major General of aviation.
- Ivan Timokhovich – Doctor of Historical Sciences, professor, Major General of aviation.

== Notable alumni ==
- Beqir Balluku, Albanian former Minister of Defense.
- Teme Sejko, Albanian rear-admiral and commander of the Albanian navy in the 1950s.
- Sherali Mirzo, Tajik Minister of Defence.
- Saken Zhasuzakov, former Defence Minister of Kazakhstan.
- Taalaibek Omuraliev, Kyrgyz Minister of Defence.
- Aleksi Inauri, Chairman of the Georgian KGB.
- Horst Stechbarth, Deputy Minister of Defense of the GDR.
- Phùng Quang Thanh, Vietnamese, former Minister of Defense of Vietnam.
- Hmayak Babayan, Armenian Red Army Major General and Hero of the Soviet Union.
- Sergey Chemezov, CEO of Rostec Corporation.
- Yordan Milanov, Bulgarian Air Force Major-General.
- Georgij Alafuzoff former Chief of Finnish Military Intelligence Service, as well as former Director of the Intelligence Directorate of the European Union Military Staff.
- Sedrak Saroyan, Armenian general and member of parliament.

== Chiefs since 1936 ==
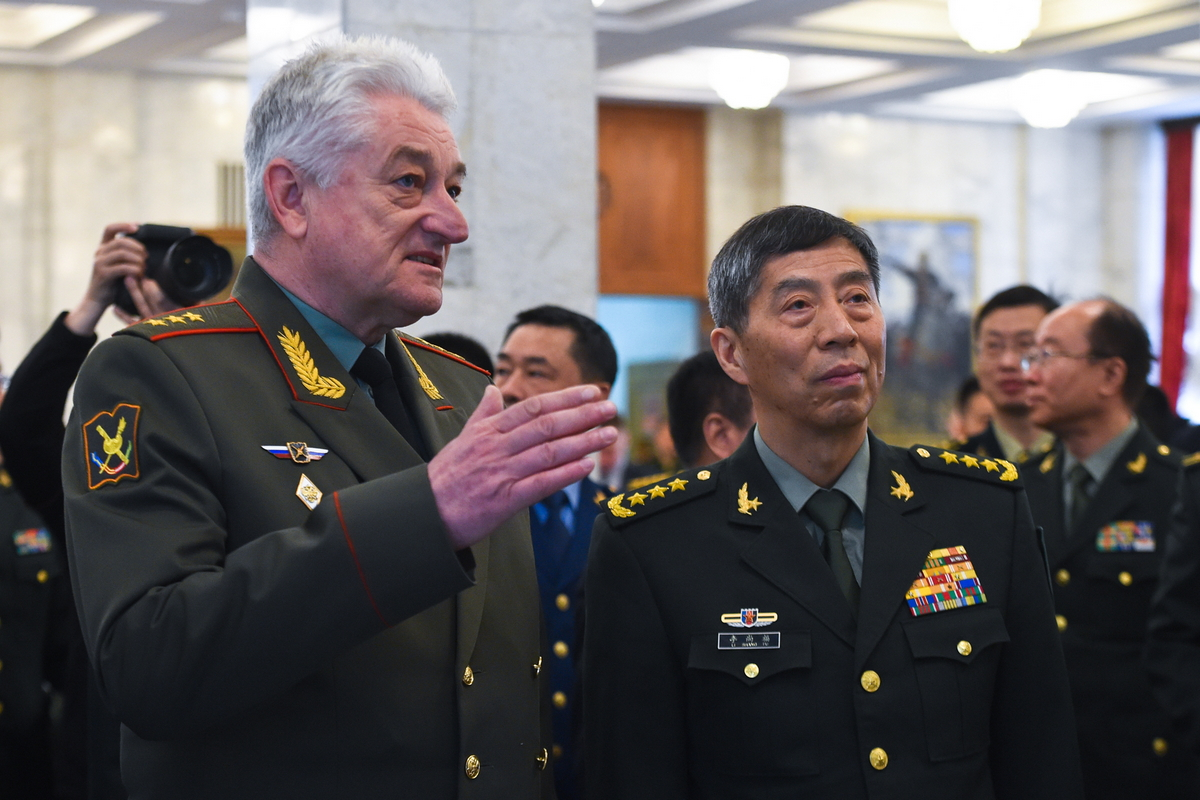
Colonel General Vladimir Zarudnitsky with Chinese Defence Minister General Li Shangfu on 17 April 2023

- Komdiv Dmitry Kuchinsky (1936—1937)
- Kombrig Ivan Shlemin (1937—1940)
- Lieutenant General Fyodor Kuznetsov (July–August 1940)
- Lieutenant General Vasily Mordvinov (1940—1941)
- Lieutenant General Yevgeny Shilovsky (1941—1942)
- Colonel General Fyodor Kuznetsov (1942—1943)
- Marshal of the Soviet Union Boris Shaposhnikov (1943—1945)
- Lieutenant General Vasily Mordvinov (March—November 1945)
- Army General Matvei Zakharov (1945—1949)
- Army General Vladimir Kurasov (1946—1956)
- Marshal of the Soviet Union Ivan Bagramyan (1956—1958)
- Army General German Malandin (1958—1961)
- Army General Vladimir Kurasov (1961—1963)
- Marshal of the Soviet Union Matvei Zakharov (1963—1965)
- Army General Vladimir Ivanov (1965—1968)
- Army General Semion Ivanov (1968—1973)
- Army General Ivan Shavrov (1973—1979)
- Army General Mikhail Kozlov (1979—1986)
- Army General Grigory Salmonov (1986—1989)
- Colonel General Igor Rodionov (1989—1996)
- Colonel General Valery Tretyakov (1996—1999)
- Colonel General Viktor Chechevatov (1999–2005)
- Army General Ivan Yefremov (2005—2007).
- Army General Aleksandr Belousov (2007—2009)
- Army General Vladimir Yakovlev (2009—2012)
- Lieutenant General of the Reserve Andrei Tretyak (2012—2013)
- Colonel General of the Reserve Sergei Makarov (2013—2016)
- Lieutenant General Sergey Kuralenko (2016—2017)
- Colonel General Vladimir Zarudnitsky (2017—present)
