= Russian Ground Forces =

Land forces of the Russian Armed Forces

Ground Forces of the Russian Federation
- Сухопутные войска Российской Федерации
- Emblem of the Russian Ground Forces
- Founded: 1550; 1992 (current form)
- Country: Russia
- Type: Army
- Size: 500,000 inc 100,000 conscripts
- Part of: Russian Armed Forces
- Headquarters: Frunzenskaya Embankment 20-22, Moscow
- Colors: Red; Green; Gold; Silver
- March: Forward, infantry! Вперёд, пехота!
- Anniversaries: 1 October
- Engagements: Transnistria War; Tajikistani Civil War; East Prigorodny Conflict; War in Abkhazia; 1993 Russian constitutional crisis; First Chechen War; War of Dagestan; 1999 East Timorese crisis; Second Chechen War; Russo-Georgian War; Insurgency in the North Caucasus; Russo-Ukrainian War; Russian annexation of Crimea; War in Donbas; Russo-Ukrainian war (2022–present); Intervention in Syria
- Website: mil.ru

Commanders
- Supreme Commander-in-Chief: President Vladimir Putin
- Minister of Defense: Andrey Belousov
- Commander-in-Chief: Colonel General Andrey Mordvichev
- Chief of the Main Staff: Colonel General Rustam Muradov
- Deputy Commander-in-Chief: Lieutenant General Aleksandr Matovnikov

Insignia
- Flag

- Patch

- Great emblem

- Middle emblem

- Insignia

The Russian Ground Forces, (Note: (Russian: Сухопу́тные войска́ [СВ], romanized: Sukhopútnye Voyská [SV])) also known as the Russian Army, are the land forces of the Russian Armed Forces.

The primary responsibilities of the Russian Ground Forces are the protection of the state borders and land-based combat operations. The president of Russia is the Supreme Commander-in-Chief of the Armed Forces of the Russian Federation. The Commander-in-Chief of the Russian Ground Forces is appointed by the president of Russia. The Main Command of the Ground Forces is based in Moscow.

== Mission ==
The primary responsibilities of the Russian Ground Forces are the protection of the state borders, combat on land, the security of occupied territories, and the defeat of enemy troops. The Ground Forces must be able to achieve these goals both in nuclear war and non-nuclear war, especially without the use of weapons of mass destruction. Furthermore, they must be capable of protecting the national interests of Russia within the framework of its international obligations.

The Main Command of the Ground Forces is officially tasked with the following objectives:

- the training of troops for combat, on the basis of tasks determined by the General Staff of the Armed Forces of the Russian Federation
- the improvement of troops' structure and composition, and the optimization of their numbers, including for Specialised Troops (ru:Специальные войска, a term covering several combat service support branches such as Engineers; Russian Signal Troops; the Russian NBC Protection Troops; Motor Transport; Russian Railway Troops, and Road Troops [road construction])
- the development of military theory and practice
- the development and introduction of training field manuals, tactics, and methodology
- the improvement of operational and combat training of the Ground Forces

It should be clearly noted that Spetsnaz GRU, most special forces, are under the control of the Main Reconnaissance Directorate (GRU), now the Main Directorate of the General Staff.

== History ==
As the Soviet Union dissolved, efforts were made to keep the Soviet Armed Forces as a single military structure for the new Commonwealth of Independent States. The last Minister of Defence of the Soviet Union, Marshal Yevgeny Shaposhnikov, was appointed supreme commander of the CIS Armed Forces in December 1991. Among the numerous treaties signed by the former republics, in order to direct the transition period, was a temporary agreement on general purpose forces, signed in Minsk on 14 February 1992. However, once it became clear that Ukraine (and potentially the other republics) was determined to undermine the concept of joint general purpose forces and form their own armed forces, the new Russian government moved to form its own armed forces.

Russian president Boris Yeltsin signed a decree forming the Russian Ministry of Defence on 7 May 1992, establishing the Russian Ground Forces along with the other branches of the Russian Armed Forces. At the same time, the General Staff was in the process of withdrawing tens of thousands of personnel from the Group of Soviet Forces in Germany, the Northern Group of Forces in Poland, the Central Group of Forces in Czechoslovakia, the Southern Group of Forces in Hungary, and from Mongolia.

Thirty-seven Soviet Ground Forces divisions had to be withdrawn from the four groups of forces and the Baltic States, and four military districts—totaling 57 divisions—were handed over to Belarus and Ukraine. Some idea of the scale of the withdrawal can be gained from the division list. For the dissolving Soviet Ground Forces, the withdrawal from the former Warsaw Pact states and the Baltic states was an extremely demanding, expensive, and debilitating process.

As the military districts that remained in Russia after the collapse of the Union consisted mostly of the mobile cadre formations, the Ground Forces were, to a large extent, created by relocating the formerly full-strength formations from Eastern Europe to under-resourced districts. However, the facilities in those districts were inadequate to house the flood of personnel and equipment returning from abroad, and many units "were unloaded from the rail wagons into empty fields." The need for destruction and transfer of large amounts of weaponry under the Treaty on Conventional Armed Forces in Europe also necessitated great adjustments.

=== Post-Soviet reform plans ===
The Ministry of Defence newspaper Krasnaya Zvezda published a reform plan on 21 July 1992. Later one commentator said it was "hastily" put together by the General Staff "to satisfy the public demand for radical changes." The General Staff, from that point, became a bastion of conservatism, causing a build-up of troubles that later became critical. The reform plan advocated a change from an Army-Division-Regiment structure to a Corps-Brigade arrangement. The new structures were to be more capable in a situation with no front line, and more capable of independent action at all levels.

Cutting out a level of command, omitting two out of three higher echelons between the theatre headquarters and the fighting battalions, would produce economies, increase flexibility, and simplify command-and-control arrangements. The expected changeover to the new structure proved to be rare, irregular, and sometimes reversed. The new brigades that appeared were mostly divisions that had broken down until they happened to be at the proposed brigade strengths. New divisions—such as the new 3rd Motor Rifle Division in the Moscow Military District, formed on the basis of disbanding tank formations—were formed, rather than new brigades.

Few of the reforms planned in the early 1990s eventuated, for three reasons: Firstly, there was an absence of firm civilian political guidance, with President Yeltsin primarily interested in ensuring that the Armed Forces were controllable and loyal, rather than reformed. Secondly, declining funding worsened the progress. Finally, there was no firm consensus within the military about what reforms should be implemented. General Pavel Grachev, the first Russian Minister of Defence (1992–96), broadly advertised reforms, yet wished to preserve the old Soviet-style Army, with large numbers of low-strength formations and continued mass conscription. The General Staff and the armed services tried to preserve Soviet-era doctrines, deployments, weapons, and missions in the absence of solid new guidance.

British military expert Michael Orr claims that the hierarchy had great difficulty in fully understanding the changed situation, due to their education. As graduates of Soviet military academies, they received great operational and staff training, but in political terms they had learned an ideology, rather than a wide understanding of international affairs. Thus, the generals—focused on NATO expansion in Eastern Europe—could not adapt themselves and the Armed Forces to the new opportunities and challenges they faced.

=== Crime and corruption in the ground forces ===
The new Russian Ground Forces inherited an increasing crime problem from their Soviet predecessors. As draft resistance grew in the last years of the Soviet Union, the authorities tried to compensate by enlisting men with criminal records and who spoke little or no Russian. Crime rates soared, with the military procurator in Moscow in September 1990 reporting a 40-percent increase in crime over the previous six months, including a 41-percent rise in serious bodily injuries. Disappearances of weapons rose to rampant levels, especially in Eastern Europe and the Caucasus.

Generals directing the withdrawals from Eastern Europe diverted arms, equipment, and foreign monies intended to build housing in Russia for the withdrawn troops. Several years later, the former commander in Germany, General Matvey Burlakov, and the defence minister, Pavel Grachev, had their involvement exposed. They were also accused of ordering the murder of reporter Dmitry Kholodov, who had been investigating the scandals. In December 1996, Defence Minister Igor Rodionov ordered the dismissal of the Commander of the Ground Forces, General Vladimir Semyonov, for activities incompatible with his position — reportedly his wife's business activities.

A 1995 study by the U.S. Foreign Military Studies Office went as far as to say that the Armed Forces were "an institution increasingly defined by the high levels of military criminality and corruption embedded within it at every level." The FMSO noted that crime levels had always grown with social turbulence, such as the trauma Russia was passing through. The author identified four major types among the raft of criminality prevalent within the forces—weapons trafficking and the arms trade; business and commercial ventures; military crime beyond Russia's borders; and contract murder. Weapons disappearances began during the dissolution of the Union and has continued. Within units "rations are sold while soldiers grow hungry ... [while] fuel, spare parts, and equipment can be bought." Meanwhile, voyemkomats take bribes to arrange avoidance of service, or a more comfortable posting.

Beyond the Russian frontier, drugs were smuggled across the Tajik border—supposedly being patrolled by Russian guards—by military aircraft, and a Russian senior officer, General Major Alexander Perelyakin, had been dismissed from his post with the United Nations peacekeeping force in Bosnia-Hercegovina (UNPROFOR), following continued complaints of smuggling, profiteering, and corruption. In terms of contract killings, beyond the Kholodov case, there have been widespread rumours that GRU Spetsnaz personnel have been moonlighting as mafiya hitmen.

Reports such as these continued. Some of the more egregious examples have included a constant-readiness motor rifle regiment's tanks running out of fuel on the firing ranges, due to the diversion of their fuel supplies to local businesses. Visiting the 20th Army in April 2002, Sergey Ivanov said the volume of theft was "simply impermissible". Ivanov said that 20,000 servicemen were wounded or injured in 2002 as a result of accidents or criminal activity across the entire armed forces - so the ground forces figure would be less.

Abuse of personnel, sending soldiers to work outside units—a long-standing tradition which could see conscripts doing things ranging from being large scale manpower supply for commercial businesses to being officers' families' servants—is now banned by Sergei Ivanov's Order 428 of October 2005. What is more, the order is being enforced, with several prosecutions recorded. President Vladimir Putin also demanded a halt to dishonest use of military property in November 2005: "We must completely eliminate the use of the Armed Forces' material base for any commercial objectives."

The spectrum of dishonest activity has included, in the past, exporting aircraft as scrap metal; but the point at which officers are prosecuted has shifted, and investigations over trading in travel warrants and junior officers' routine thieving of soldiers' meals are beginning to be reported. However, British military analysts comment that "there should be little doubt that the overall impact of theft and fraud is much greater than that which is actually detected". Chief Military Prosecutor Sergey Fridinskiy said in March 2007 that there was "no systematic work in the Armed Forces to prevent embezzlement".

In March 2011, Military Prosecutor General Sergei Fridinsky reported that crimes had been increasing steadily in the Russian ground forces for the past 18 months, with 500 crimes reported in the period of January to March 2011 alone. Twenty servicemen were crippled and two killed in the same period as a result. Crime in the ground forces was up 16% in 2010 as compared to 2009, with crimes against other servicemen constituting one in every four cases reported.

Compounding this problem was also a rise in "extremist" crimes in the ground forces, with "servicemen from different ethnic groups or regions trying to enforce their own rules and order in their units", according to the Prosecutor General. Fridinsky also lambasted the military investigations department for their alleged lack of efficiency in investigative matters, with only one in six criminal cases being revealed. Military commanders were also accused of concealing crimes committed against servicemen from military officials.

A major corruption scandal also occurred at the elite Lipetsk pilot training center, where the deputy commander, the chief of staff and other officers allegedly extorted 3 million roubles of premium pay from other officers since the beginning of 2010. The Tambov military garrison prosecutor confirmed that charges have been lodged against those involved. The affair came to light after a junior officer wrote about the extortion in his personal blog. Sergey Fridinskiy, the Main Military Prosecutor acknowledged that extortion in the distribution of supplementary pay in army units is common, and that "criminal cases on the facts of extortion are being investigated in practically every district and fleet."

In August 2012, Prosecutor General Fridinsky again reported a rise in crime, with murders rising more than half, bribery cases doubling, and drug trafficking rising by 25% in the first six months of 2012 as compared to the same period in the previous year. Following the release of these statistics, the Union of the Committees of Soldiers' Mothers of Russia denounced the conditions in the Armed Forces as a "crime against humanity".

In July 2013, the Prosecutor General of Russia's office revealed that corruption in the same year had grown 5.5 times as compared to the previous year, costing the Russian government 4.4 billion rubles (US$130 million). It was also revealed that total number of registered crimes in the Russian armed forces had declined in the same period, although one in five crimes registered were corruption-related.

"In 2019, Chief Military Prosecutor Valery Petrov reported that some $110 million had been lost due to corruption in the military departments and the number was on the uptick."

=== Involvement in Russian constitutional crisis of 1993 ===
The Russian Ground Forces reluctantly became involved in the Russian constitutional crisis of 1993 after President Yeltsin issued an unconstitutional decree dissolving the Russian Parliament, following its resistance to Yeltsin's consolidation of power and his neo-liberal reforms. A group of deputies, including Vice President Alexander Rutskoi, barricaded themselves inside the parliament building. While giving public support to the president, the Armed Forces, led by General Grachev, tried to remain neutral, following the wishes of the officer corps. The military leadership were unsure of both the rightness of Yeltsin's cause and the reliability of their forces, and had to be convinced at length by Yeltsin to attack the parliament.

When the attack was finally mounted, forces from five different divisions around Moscow were used, and the personnel involved were mostly officers and senior non-commissioned officers. There were also indications that some formations deployed into Moscow only under protest. However, once the parliament building had been stormed, the parliamentary leaders arrested, and temporary censorship imposed, Yeltsin succeeded in retaining power.

=== Chechen Wars ===
==== First Chechen War ====
With the dissolution of the Soviet Union, the Chechens declared independence in November 1991, under the leadership of a former Air Forces officer, General Dzhokhar Dudayev. The continuation of Chechen independence was seen as reducing Moscow's authority; Chechnya became perceived as a haven for criminals, and a hard-line group within the Kremlin began advocating war. A Security Council meeting was held 29 November 1994, where Yeltsin ordered the Chechens to disarm, or else Moscow would restore order. Defence Minister Pavel Grachev assured Yeltsin that he would "take Grozny with one airborne assault regiment in two hours."

The operation began on 11 December 1994 and, by 31 December, Russian forces were entering Grozny, the Chechen capital. The 131st Motor Rifle Brigade was ordered to make a swift push for the centre of the city, but was then virtually destroyed in Chechen ambushes. After finally seizing Grozny amid fierce resistance, Russian troops moved on to other Chechen strongholds. When Chechen militants took hostages in the Budyonnovsk hospital hostage crisis in Stavropol Kray in June 1995, peace looked possible for a time, but the fighting continued. Following this incident, the separatists were referred to as insurgents or terrorists within Russia.

Dzhokhar Dudayev was assassinated in a Russian airstrike on 21 April 1996, and that summer, a Chechen attack retook Grozny. Alexander Lebed, then Secretary of the Security Council, began talks with the Chechen rebel leader Aslan Maskhadov in August 1996 and signed an agreement on 22/23 August; by the end of that month, the fighting ended. The formal ceasefire was signed in the Dagestani town of Khasavyurt on 31 August 1996, stipulating that a formal agreement on relations between the Chechen Republic of Ichkeria and the Russian federal government need not be signed until late 2001.

Writing some years later, Dmitri Trenin and Aleksei Malashenko described the Russian military's performance in Chechniya as "grossly deficient at all levels, from commander-in-chief to the drafted private." The Ground Forces' performance in the First Chechen War has been assessed by a British academic as "appallingly bad". Writing six years later, Michael Orr said "one of the root causes of the Russian failure in 1994–96 was their inability to raise and deploy a properly trained military force."

Then Lieutenant Colonel Mark Hertling of the U.S. Army had the chance to visit the Ground Forces in 1994:

The Russian barracks were spartan, with twenty beds lined up in a large room similar to what the U.S. Army had during World War II. The food in their mess halls was terrible. The Russian "training and exercises" we observed were not opportunities to improve capabilities or skills, but rote demonstrations, with little opportunity for maneuver or imagination. The military college classroom where a group of middle- and senior-ranking officers conducted a regimental map exercise was rudimentary, with young soldiers manning radio-telephones relaying orders to imaginary units in some imaginary field location. On the motor pool visit, I was able to crawl into a T-80 tank—it was cramped, dirty, and in poor repair—and even fire a few rounds in a very primitive simulator.

In June 1999 Russian forces, though not the Ground Forces, were involved in a confrontation with NATO. Parts of the 1st Separate Airborne Brigade of the Russian Airborne Forces raced to seize control of Pristina Airport in what became Kosovo, leading to the Incident at Pristina airport.

==== Second Chechen War ====
The Second Chechen War began in August 1999 after Chechen militias invaded neighboring Dagestan, followed quickly in early September by a series of four terrorist bombings across Russia. This prompted Russian military action against the alleged Chechen culprits.

In the first Chechen war, the Russians primarily laid waste to an area with artillery and airstrikes before advancing the land forces. Improvements were made in the Ground Forces between 1996 and 1999; when the Second Chechen War started, instead of hastily assembled "composite regiments" dispatched with little or no training, whose members had never seen service together, formations were brought up to strength with replacements, put through preparatory training, and then dispatched. Combat performance improved accordingly, and large-scale opposition was crippled.

Most of the prominent past Chechen separatist leaders had died or been killed, including former president Aslan Maskhadov and leading warlord and terrorist attack mastermind Shamil Basayev. However, small-scale conflict continued to drag on; as of November 2007, it had spread across other parts of the Russian Caucasus. It was a divisive struggle, with at least one senior military officer dismissed for being unresponsive to government commands: General Colonel Gennady Troshev was dismissed in 2002 for refusing to move from command of the North Caucasus Military District to command of the less important Siberian Military District.

The Second Chechen War was officially declared ended on 16 April 2009.

=== Reforms ===
==== Under Sergeyev ====
When Igor Sergeyev arrived as Minister of Defence in 1997, he initiated what were seen as real reforms under very difficult conditions. The number of military educational establishments, virtually unchanged since 1991, was reduced, and the amalgamation of the Siberian and Trans-Baikal Military Districts was ordered. A larger number of army divisions were given "constant readiness" status, which was supposed to bring them up to 80 percent manning and 100 percent equipment holdings. Sergeyev announced in August 1998 that there would be six divisions and four brigades on 24-hour alert by the end of that year. Three levels of forces were announced; constant readiness, low-level, and strategic reserves.

However, personnel quality—even in these favored units—continued to be a problem. Lack of fuel for training and a shortage of well-trained junior officers hampered combat effectiveness. However, concentrating on the interests of his old service, the Strategic Rocket Forces, Sergeyev directed the disbanding of the Ground Forces headquarters itself in December 1997. The disbandment was a "military nonsense", in Orr's words, "justifiable only in terms of internal politics within the Ministry of Defence". The Ground Forces' prestige declined as a result, as the headquarters disbandment implied—at least in theory—that the Ground Forces no longer ranked equally with the Air Force and Navy.

==== Under Vladimir Putin ====
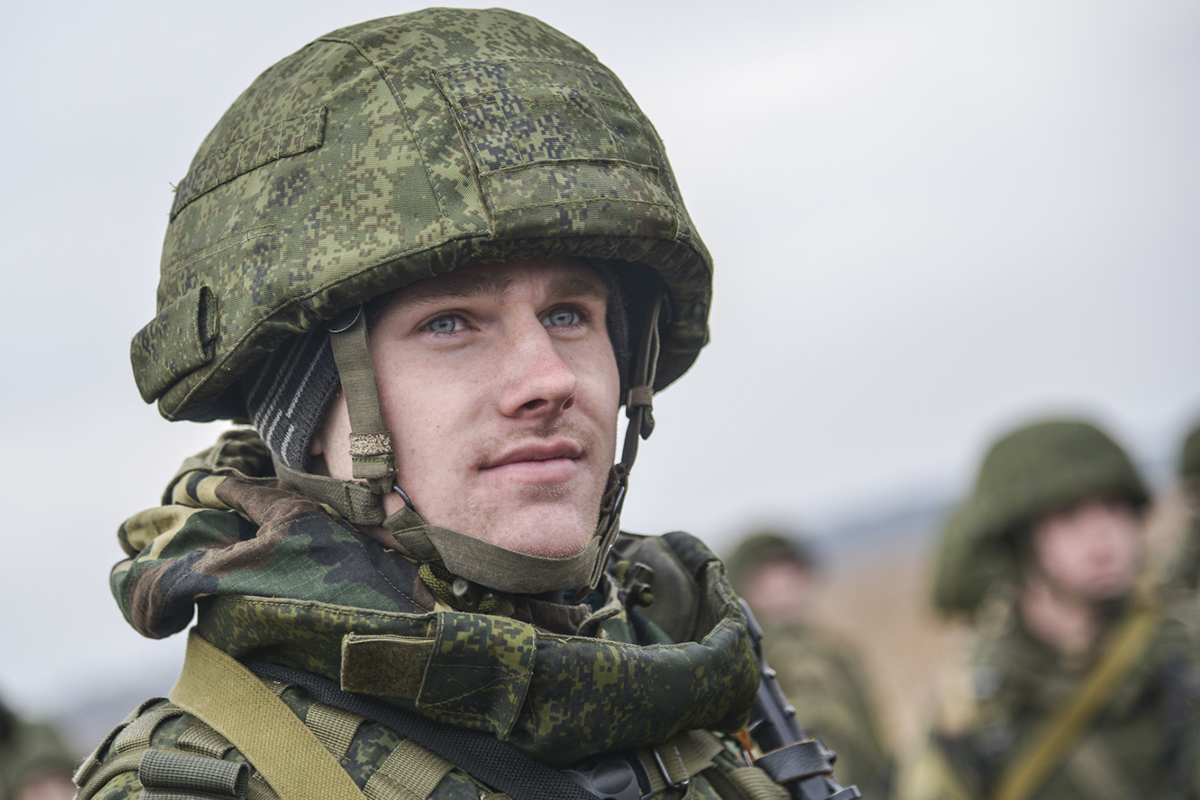
A Russian airborne exercise in 2017

Under President Vladimir Putin, more funds were committed, the Ground Forces Headquarters was reestablished, and some progress on professionalisation occurred. Plans called for reducing mandatory service to 18 months in 2007, and to one year by 2008, but a mixed Ground Force, of both contract soldiers and conscripts, would remain. (As of 2009, the length of conscript service was 12 months.)

Funding increases began in 1999. After some recovery of the economy and the associated rise in income, especially from oil, "..officially reported defence spending [rose] in nominal terms at least, for the first time since the formation of the Russian Federation". The budget rose from 141 billion rubles in 2000 to 219 billion rubles in 2001. Much of this funding has been spent on personnel—there have been several pay rises, starting with a 20-percent rise authorised in 2001. The current professionalisation programme, including 26,000 extra sergeants, was expected to cost at least 31 billion roubles (US$1.1 billion). Increased funding has been spread across the whole budget, with personnel spending being matched by greater procurement and research and development funding.

However, in 2004, Alexander Goltz said that, given the insistence of the hierarchy on trying to force contract soldiers into the old conscript pattern, there is little hope of a fundamental strengthening of the Ground Forces. He further elaborated that they are expected to remain, to some extent, a military liability and "Russia's most urgent social problem" for some time to come. Goltz summed up by saying: "All of this means that the Russian armed forces are not ready to defend the country and that, at the same time, they are also dangerous for Russia. Top military personnel demonstrate neither the will nor the ability to effect fundamental changes."

In May 2007, it was announced that enlisted pay would rise to 65,000 roubles (US$2,750) per month, and the pay of officers on combat duty in rapid response units would rise to 100,000–150,000 roubles (US$4,230–$6,355) per month. However, while the move to one year conscript service would disrupt dedovshchina, it is unlikely that bullying will disappear altogether without significant societal change. Other assessments from the same source point out that the Russian Armed Forces faced major disruption in 2008, as demographic change hindered plans to reduce the term of conscription from two years to one.

==== Under Serdyukov ====
A major reorganisation of the force began in 2007 by the Minister for Defence Anatoliy Serdyukov, with the aim of converting all divisions into brigades, and cutting surplus officers and establishments.

In a statement on 4 September 2009, RGF Commander-in-Chief Vladimir Boldyrev said that half of the Russian land forces were reformed by 1 June and that 85 brigades of constant combat preparedness had already been created. Among them are the combined-arms brigade, missile brigades, assault brigades and electronic warfare brigades.

During General Mark Hertling's term as Commander, United States Army Europe in 2011–2012, he visited Russia at the invitation of the Commander of the Ground Forces, "Colonel-General (corresponding to an American lieutenant general) Aleksandr Streitsov. ..[A]t preliminary meetings" with the Embassy of the United States, Moscow, the U.S. Defence Attache told Hertling that the Ground Forces "while still substantive in quantity, continued to decline in capability and quality. My subsequent visits to the schools and units [Colonel General] Streitsov chose reinforced these conclusions. The classroom discussions were sophomoric, and the units in training were going through the motions of their scripts with no true training value or combined arms interaction—infantry, armor, artillery, air, and resupply all trained separately."

==== Under Shoygu ====
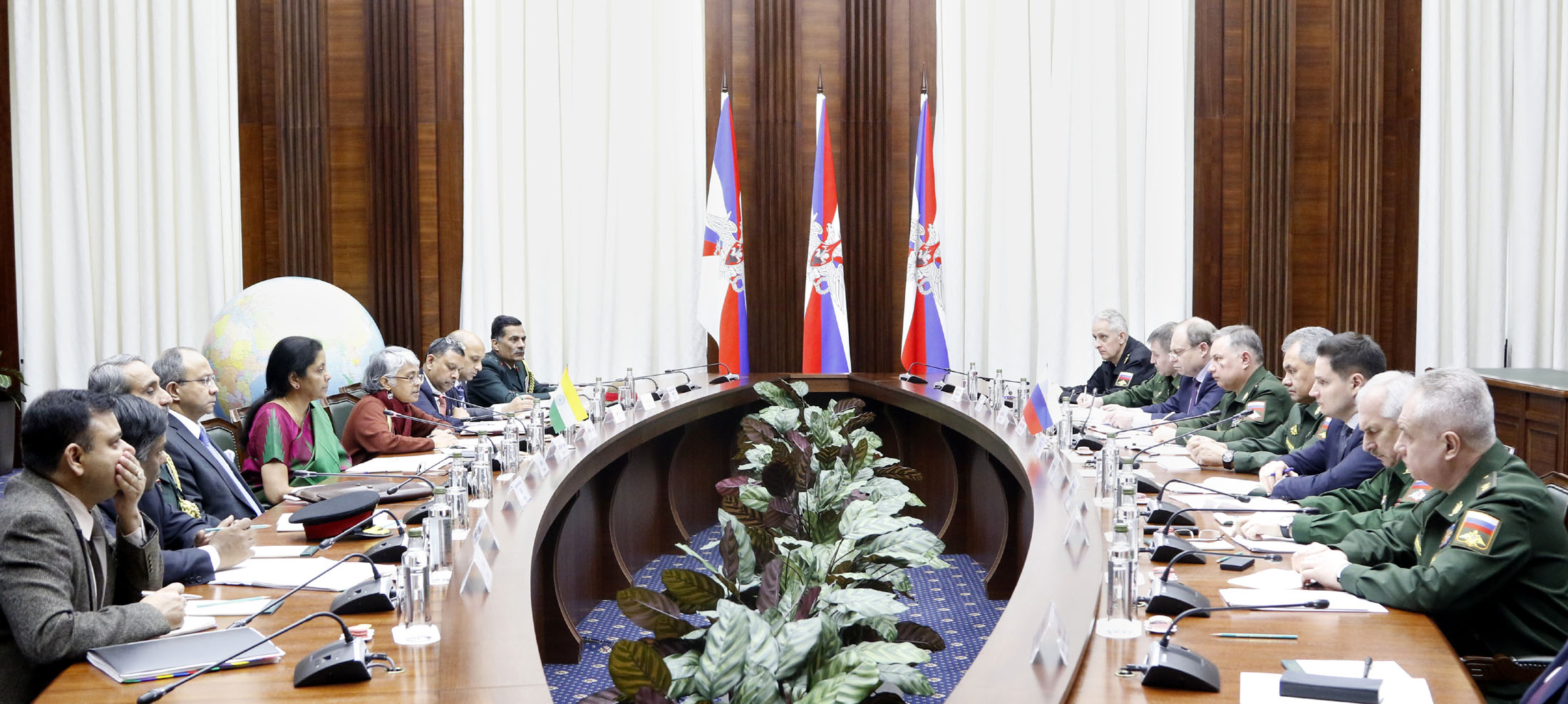
Sergey Shoygu meeting with Indian officials in 2018

After Sergey Shoygu took over the role of Ministry of Defence, the reforms Serdyukov had implemented were reversed. He also aimed to restore trust with senior officers as well as the Ministry of Defence in the wake of the intense resentment Serduykov's reforms had generated. He did this a number of ways but one of the ways was integrating himself by wearing a military uniform.

Shoygu ordered 750 military exercises, such as Vostok 2018. The exercises also seemed to have helped validate the general direction of reform. The effect of this readiness was seen during Russia's annexation of Crimea in 2014. Since Anatoliy Serdyukov had already completed the unpopular reforms (military downsizing and reorganization), it was relatively easy for Shoygu to be conciliatory with the officer corps and Ministry of Defence.

Rearmament has been an important goal of reform, with the goal of 70% modernization by 2020. From 1998 to 2001, the Ground Forces received almost no new equipment. Sergey Shoygu took a less confrontational approach with the defence industry. By showing better flexibility on terms and pricing, the awarding of new contracts for the upcoming period was much better. Shoygu promised that future contracts would be awarded primarily to domestic firms. While easing tensions, these concessions also weakened incentives for companies to improve performance.

Shoygu also focused on forming battalion tactical groups (BTGs) as the permanent readiness component of the Russian army, rather than brigade-sized formations. According to sources quoted by the Russian Interfax agency, this was due to a lack of the manpower needed for permanent-readiness brigades. BTGs made up the preponderance of units deployed by Russia in the war in Donbas. By August 2021 Shoygu claimed that the Russian army had around 170 BTGs.

=== Russo-Ukrainian War ===
Russia conducted a military buildup on the Ukrainian border starting in late 2021. By mid February 2022, elements of the 29th, 35th and 36th Combined Arms Armies (CAAs) were deployed to Belarus, supported by additional S-400 systems, a squadron of Su-25 and a squadron of Su-35; additional S-400 systems and four Su-30 fighters were deployed to the country for joint use with Belarus. Russia also had the 20th and 8th CAAs and the 22nd AC regularly deployed near the Ukrainian border, while elements of 41st CAA were deployed to Yelnya, elements of 1st TA and 6th CAA were deployed to Voronezh and elements of the 49th and the 58th CAA were deployed to Crimea. In all, Russia deployed some 150,000 soldiers around Ukraine during this time, in preparation for the eventual Russian invasion.

On 11 February, the US and western nations communicated that Putin had decided to invade Ukraine, and on 12 February, the US and Russian embassies in Kyiv started to evacuate personnel. On 24 February, Russian troops began invading Ukraine.

During the 2022 Russian invasion of Ukraine, Russian tank losses were reported as a consequence of the Ukrainian use of sophisticated anti-tank weapons and a lack of air support. The Russian army has been described by Phillips O'Brien, a professor of strategic studies at St Andrews University as "a boxer who has a great right hook and a glass jaw." Quoting Napoleon "In war, moral power is to physical as three parts out of four." Retired US four-star general Curtis Scaparrotti has blamed confusion and poor morale amongst Russian soldiers over their mission as to their poor performance.

Due to the fighting in Ukraine the 2022 Moscow Victory Day Parade was to be reduced by some 35%, purely in ground combat vehicles or systems. The parade on 9 May 2022, according to the official guide, would feature only 25 combat systems and 131 ground combat vehicles, compared to 2021 where it featured 198 vehicles and 35 combat systems. In particular there was a shortage of display ready T-80 tanks and Russia used older equipment to make up numbers. An example is usage of tank transporters in lieu of actual tanks. In 2023 the trend accelerated; only a single World War II-vintage tank was at the parade. As of 6 May, at least 12 generals have been killed in Ukraine, according to the Ukrainian Ministry of Defence. This "suggests that the generals need to be at the front lines to ensure that their troops are conducting the battle plan in the way that they want. But that also suggests a lack of confidence in their troops if they need to be that far forward with that many senior folks." Ukraine further claims that some 317 officers have been killed, a third of whom are senior command staff. In a tweet the UK MoD said that the Russian officer corps was suffering "devastating losses" particularly in the junior to mid officer ranks. United States officials estimated that Russian forces had lost 150,000+ killed and wounded from 24 February 2022 – 21 January 2023. In stark contrast, the Russian Defence Minister said that only 5,937 personnel from the entire Russian Armed Forces had been killed from 24 February – 21 September 2022, the first seven months of fighting. Reported figures from Donetsk and Luhansk would add some 22,000 to this figure.

After 14 months of fighting, Russian forces are estimated to have lost over 2,000 tanks, struggling to replace its tank losses due to sanctions by Europe and the United States. This has caused Russia to compensate by instead of using imported goods, using locally made equipment deemed less efficient, and reactivating tanks from the 1950s and 1960s.

On 14 February 2023, British defence secretary Ben Wallace told the BBC that 97% of the Russian ground forces were now committed to the war in Ukraine. Three months afterwards, Russia did not display a single modern tank for the 2023 Moscow Victory Day Parade.

In February 2023, launching the 2023 Military Balance, the IISS estimated Ground Forces numbers had climbed to an estimated 550,000, including an estimated 100,000 conscripts and up to 300,000 mobilized personnel. This number should be set against the Central Intelligence Agency's estimate of 300,000 active duty before February 2022.

In October 2023, it was reported that there was a growth of mutinies among Russian troops due to large amount of losses in offensives around Avdiivka with a lack of artillery, food, water and poor command also being reported.

==== Involvement in Crimea before 2022 ====
″Little green men″, a phrase used by both Russian and Ukrainian reporters in 2014, referred to armed men in Crimea resembling the Russian military. They were described as using the same weapons, using Russian license plates for their trucks, and speaking in Russian accents. Despite repeated denials, Russia later confirmed its military presence in Crimea, with Putin giving contradictory statements during a 2018 interview with journalist Armin Wolf, claiming that ″the Russian Army was always there″.

== Structure ==
The president of Russia is the Supreme Commander-in-Chief of the Armed Forces of the Russian Federation. The Main Command (Glavkomat) of the Ground Forces, based in Moscow, directs activities. This body was disbanded in 1997, but reformed by President Putin in 2001 by appointing Colonel General Nikolai Kormiltsev as the Commander-in-Chief of the Russian Ground Forces and also as a deputy minister of defence.

In January 2014, the acting commander of the Russian Ground Forces was Lieutenant General Sergei Istrakov, who was appointed by Putin upon the dismissal of former commander Colonel General Vladimir Chirkin over corruption charges in December 2013. Istrakov handed over his position to a new commander on 2 May 2014, Colonel General Oleg Salyukov. In May 2025, Colonel General Andrey Mordvichev was appointed as new commander in chief of the ground forces.

The Main Command of the Ground Forces consists of the Main Staff of the Ground Troops, and departments for Peacekeeping Forces, Armaments of the Ground Troops, Rear Services of the Ground Troops, Cadres of the Ground Troops (personnel), Indoctrination Work, and Military Education. There were also a number of directorates which used to be commanded by the Commander-in-Chief of the Ground Forces, in his capacity as a deputy defence minister. They included NBC Protection Troops of the Armed Forces, Engineer Troops of the Armed Forces, and Troop Air Defence, as well as several others. Their exact command status is now unknown.

=== Branches of service ===
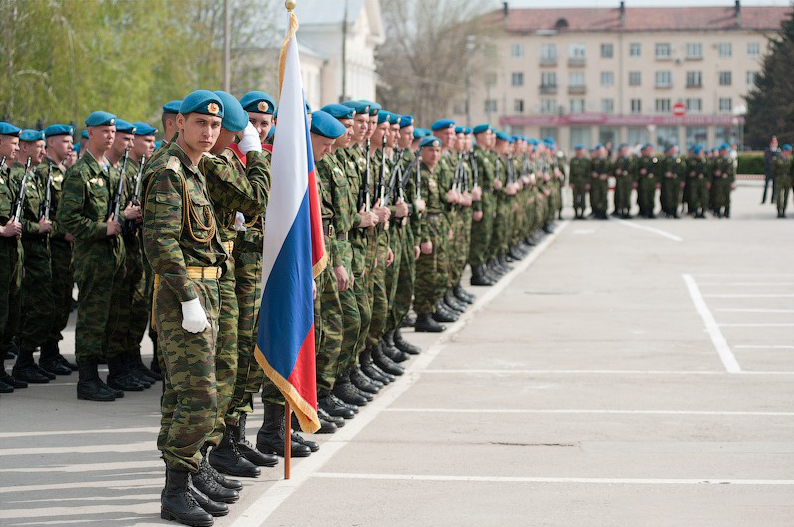
The 3rd Spetsnaz Brigade on parade

The branches of service include motorized rifles, tanks, artillery and rocket forces, troop air defence, special corps (reconnaissance, signals, electronic warfare, engineering, nuclear, biological and chemical protection, logistical support, automobile, and the protection of the rear), special forces, military units, and logistical establishments.

The Motorised Rifle Troops, the most numerous branch of service, constitutes the nucleus of Ground Forces' battle formations. They are equipped with powerful armament for destruction of ground-based and aerial targets, missile complexes, tanks, artillery and mortars, anti-tank guided missiles, anti-aircraft missile systems and installations, and means of reconnaissance and control. It is estimated that there were 16 motor rifle divisions and 12 motor rifle brigades before the "new look" reforms With the reform, these motor rifle units were converted into 35 motor rifle brigades. With the replacement of Anatoly Serdyukov with Sergei Shoigu as Minister of Defence, some of the disbanded divisions were reformed from already existing brigades, while others, like the 144th Guards Motor Rifle Division were reformed from scratch. Some units, like the 80th Arctic Motor Rifle Brigade, are trained especially for a specific environment.

The Navy also has several motor rifle formations under its command in the Ground and Coastal Defence Forces of the Baltic Fleet, the Northeastern Group of Troops and Forces on the Kamchatka Peninsula and other areas of the extreme northeast, apart from traditional naval infantry units.

The Tank Troops are the main impact force of the Ground Forces and a powerful mean of armed struggle, intended for the accomplishment of the most important combat tasks. In 2007, there were three tank divisions in the force: the 4th Guards "Kantemirovskaya" and 10th Guards "Uralsko-Lvovskaya" within the Moscow Military District, and the 5th Guards "Don" in the Siberian MD. The 2nd Guards "Tatsinkaya" Tank Division in the Siberian Military District and the 21st Tank Division in the Far Eastern MD were disbanded in the early 2000s, although the first one is still represented in the ground forces though the 5th Separate Guards "Tatsinkaya" Tank Brigade. Like motor rifle divisions, all tank divisions were transformed into brigades following the 2008 reforms, although the 4th Guards Tank Division was reformed in 2013, with two new tank divisions, the 90th Guards and the 47th Guards being created from pre-existing brigades in 2016 and 2022, respectively. The 10th Guards Tank Division is still represented in the ground forces though the 1st Separate Uralsko-Lvovskaya Tank Brigade. As of 2022, there were 3 tank divisions and 2 tank brigades.

The Artillery and Rocket Forces provide the Ground Forces' main firepower. The Ground Forces previously included six static defence machine-gun/artillery and field artillery divisions. The only remaining unit of this type is the 18th Machine Gun Artillery Division The previous 34th Guards in the Moscow MD, 12th in the Siberian MD, and the 15th in the Far Eastern MD, seem to have disbanded. The 127th Machine Gun Artillery Division was transformed into a motor rifle unit following the Serdyukov reforms. As of 2022, there were 1 machine gun artillery divisions and 17 artillery brigades.

The Air Defence Troops (PVO) are one of the basic weapons for the destruction of enemy air forces. They consist of surface-to-air missiles, anti-aircraft artillery and radio-technical units and subdivisions.

Army Aviation, while intended for the direct support of the Ground Forces, has been under the control of the Air Forces (VVS) since 2003. However, it was planned that by 2015, Army Aviation will have been transferred back to the Ground Forces and 18 new aviation brigades will have been added. Of the around 1,000 new helicopters that have been ordered under the State Armament Programmes, 900 will be for the Army Aviation. This transfer did not take place.

The Spetsnaz GRU serve under the Ground Forces in peacetime and at the same time are directly subordinated to the Main Directorate of Intelligence (GRU) and will fall under GRU operational control during wartime operations or under special circumstances.

=== Dispositions since 2021 ===
As a result of the 2008 Russian military reforms, the ground forces now consist of armies subordinate to the four new military districts: Western, Southern, Central, and Eastern Military Districts. The new districts have the role of 'operational strategic commands,' which command the Ground Forces as well as the Naval Forces and part of the Air and Air Defence Forces within their areas of responsibility.

Each major formation is bolded, and directs the non-bolded major subordinate formations. It is not entirely clear to which superior(s) the four operational-strategic commands will report from 1 December 2010, as they command formations from multiple services (Air Force, Ground Forces & Navy). A current detailed list of the subordinate units of the four military districts can be found in the respective articles.

Since 1 January 2021, the Northern Fleet has been elevated into the Northern Fleet Joint Strategic Command. However, in December 2022 it was announced that the Moscow and Leningrad Military Districts were to be reformed. It is thus likely that the Northern Fleet will be relieved of land forces command responsibilities.

Before the beginning of the renewed Russian invasion of Ukraine, (the ″special military operation″), Ground Forces formations—including Combined Arms Armies, the 1st Guards Tank Army, and directly-reporting army corps— were organized into groups of forces. Four were originally formed, based on the four military districts formed after 2008. The group of forces were assigned a direction of strategic movement, originally by the General Staff, but, at times afterwards, by the Joint Group of Forces (the General Staff's temporary operational command). Units of the Spetsnaz GRU, Airborne Forces, or Naval Infantry are moved around among the groups of forces and used to capture key terrain or strengthen Ground Forces capabilities as needed. Within a group of forces, the command assigns operational directions to subordinate Ground Forces formations, and weighs the main strike and supporting strikes, which is done through the allocation of artillery, and of Airborne or Naval Infantry units.

Leningrad Military District Moscow Military District Southern Military District (including six regions internationally recognized as Ukraine) Central Military District Eastern Military District

| Formation | Field army | Headquarters location |
|---|---|---|
| **Moscow Military District** (Colonel General Sergey Kuzovlev) (HQ Moscow) | 1st Guards Tank Army | Odintsovo |
| **Moscow Military District** (Colonel General Sergey Kuzovlev) (HQ Moscow) | 20th Guards Combined Arms Army | Voronezh |
| **Leningrad Military District** (Colonel General Yevgeny Nikiforov) (HQ Saint Petersburg) | 6th Combined Arms Army | Agalatovo |
| **Leningrad Military District** (Colonel General Yevgeny Nikiforov) (HQ Saint Petersburg) | 11th Army Corps | Kaliningrad |
| **Leningrad Military District** (Colonel General Yevgeny Nikiforov) (HQ Saint Petersburg) | 14th Army Corps | Murmansk |
| **Leningrad Military District** (Colonel General Yevgeny Nikiforov) (HQ Saint Petersburg) | 44th Army Corps | Petrozavodsk |
| **Southern Military District** (Lieutenant General Sergey Medvedev) (HQ Rostov-on-Don) | 3rd Guards Combined Arms Army | Luhansk |
| **Southern Military District** (Lieutenant General Sergey Medvedev) (HQ Rostov-on-Don) | 8th Guards Combined Arms Army | Novocherkassk |
| **Southern Military District** (Lieutenant General Sergey Medvedev) (HQ Rostov-on-Don) | 18th Combined Arms Army | Sevastopol |
| **Southern Military District** (Lieutenant General Sergey Medvedev) (HQ Rostov-on-Don) | 49th Combined Arms Army | Stavropol |
| **Southern Military District** (Lieutenant General Sergey Medvedev) (HQ Rostov-on-Don) | 51st Combined Arms Army | Donetsk |
| **Southern Military District** (Lieutenant General Sergey Medvedev) (HQ Rostov-on-Don) | 58th Guards Combined Arms Army | Vladikavkaz |
| **Central Military District** (Colonel General Andrey Ivanayev) (HQ Yekaterinburg) | 2nd Guards Combined Arms Army | Samara |
| **Central Military District** (Colonel General Andrey Ivanayev) (HQ Yekaterinburg) | 41st Guards Combined Arms Army | Novosibirsk |
| **Central Military District** (Colonel General Andrey Ivanayev) (HQ Yekaterinburg) | 3rd Army Corps | Mulino, Nizhny Novgorod Oblast |
| **Eastern Military District** (Colonel General Pyotr Bolgarev) (HQ Khabarovsk) | 5th Guards Combined Arms Army | Ussuriysk |
| **Eastern Military District** (Colonel General Pyotr Bolgarev) (HQ Khabarovsk) | 29th Guards Combined Arms Army | Chita |
| **Eastern Military District** (Colonel General Pyotr Bolgarev) (HQ Khabarovsk) | 35th Combined Arms Army | Belogorsk |
| **Eastern Military District** (Colonel General Pyotr Bolgarev) (HQ Khabarovsk) | 36th Combined Arms Army | Ulan Ude |
| **Eastern Military District** (Colonel General Pyotr Bolgarev) (HQ Khabarovsk) | 68th Army Corps | Yuzhno-Sakhalinsk |

== Personnel ==
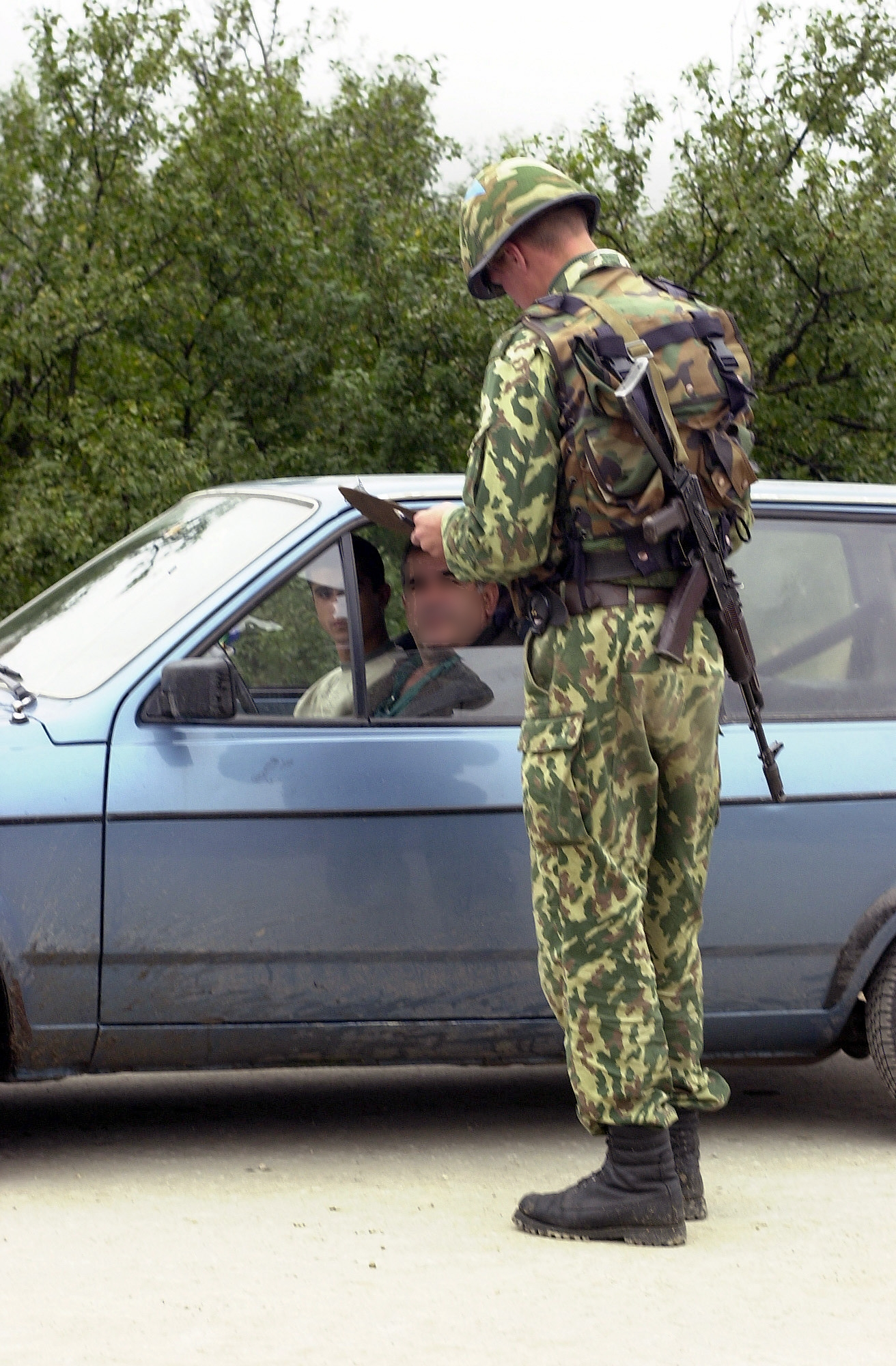
A Russian soldier at a checkpoint in Kosovo in 2001

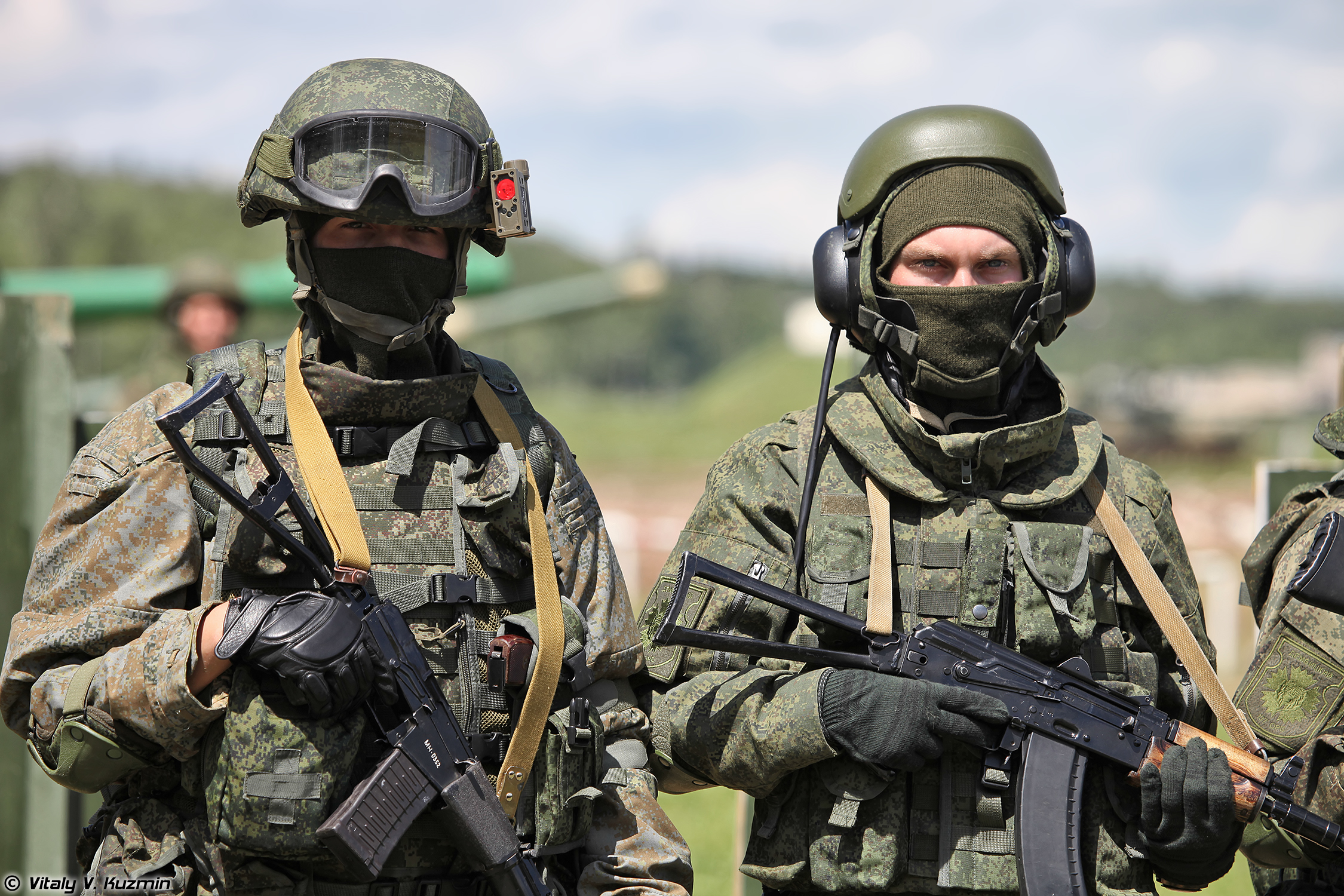
Ratnik equipment being worn by troops of the 4th Guards Tank Division

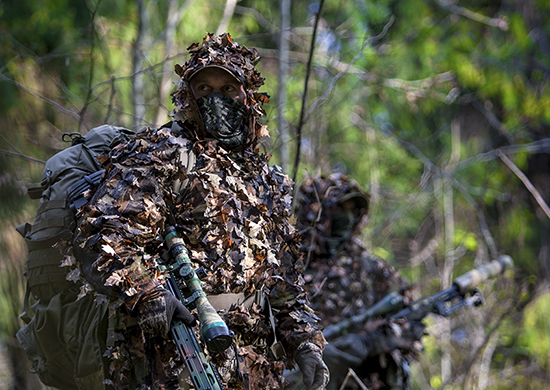
Russian Spetsnaz (Special Forces) snipers

The Ground Forces began their existence in 1992, inheriting the Soviet military manpower system practically unchanged, though it was in a state of rapid decay. The Soviet Ground Forces were traditionally manned through terms of conscription, which had been reduced in 1967 from three to two years and in 2008 to a full year, following which those who have served their mandatory service may sign contracts to become professional servicemen. This system was administered through the thousands of military commissariats (voyenkomats) located throughout the Soviet Union. The voyenkomat worked to quotas sent out by a department of the General Staff, listing how many young men were required by each service and branch of the Armed Forces. During the 1990s, draft evasion skyrocketed - officials regularly bemoan the ten or so percent that actually appear when summoned. The new conscripts were then picked up by an officer from their future unit and usually sent by train across the country.

In the early 2000s, many junior officers did not wish to serve—in 2002, more than half the officers who left the forces did so early. Their morale was low, among other reasons because their postings were entirely in the hands of their immediate superiors and the personnel department."

In 2006, the Ground Forces included an estimated total of 360,000 persons, including approximately 190,000 conscripts. The IISS counted both the Ground Forces and the Russian Airborne Forces together, which produced a figure of 395,000. This can be compared to an estimated 670,000, with 210,000 conscripts, in 1995–96. In 2025, the IISS estimated that there were 550,000 soldiers in the Ground Forces, including about 100,000 conscripts.

=== Enlisted personnel ===
The Ground Forces use both conscripts and contract soldiers (kontraktniki). Despite efforts since the early 2000s to increase numbers of permanently serving enlisted personnel, it remains dependent on conscripts. Enlisting both conscripts and contract soldiers is administered through the thousands of military commissariats (voyenkomats) located throughout the country. A conscript is a male Russian citizen between the ages of 18 and 30, while a contract soldier can be a citizen or non-citizen that voluntarily signs a contract with the Ministry of Defense.

From small beginnings in the early 1990s, employment of contract soldiers has grown greatly within the Ground Forces. Both presidents Boris Yeltsin and Vladimir Putin (in his early term) wanted to downsize and professionalize the army. During 1990s and early 2000s, the army experienced severe discipline problems and crime, including dedovshchina, and some of it was connected to conscription, leading to popular support for its reduction or abolition. After starting strong in the late 1990s, recruitment of contract soldiers declined in the following decade. The CIA reported in the World Factbook that 30 percent of Russian army personnel were contract servicemen at the end of 2005, and that, as of May 2006, 178,000 contract servicemen were serving in the Ground Forces and the Navy. Since the start of the invasion of Ukraine in 2022, Russia has been reportedly recruiting between 400,000 and 500,000 contract soldiers each year, according to the Ministry of Defense.

In the Russian and previously Soviet ground forces, after about three days of processing, a conscript is sent to his unit and begins one month of training, known as the Course for Young Soldiers (курс молодого бойца), for the basics of marching, soldiering, and marksmanship. That is followed by an oath of loyalty and assignment to a squad in his unit. Training centers exist to provide three to six months of additional training, such as in particular specialties and branches of the Ground Forces, or to prepare them for section commanders' and platoon sergeants' positions. These conscript NCOs were supplemented by praporshchik warrant officers, positions created in the 1960s to support the increased variety of skills required for modern weapons. Initial training is the responsibility of units, because centralized initial training has not been adopted for the entire army.

Each military district has a Ground Forces regional training center, and multiple training centers for specialized roles. Current law prohibits sending conscripts into combat without a minimum of four months of training, though martial law or general mobilization could supersede it, allowing for the immediate employment of mobilized reservists or newly conscripted personnel. In January 2023, Sergey Shoigu announced that the army will increase the number of enlisted soldiers, who are better trained than conscripts. The non-commissioned officers and warrant officers have much less formal authority than those in Western armies. The Russian military has historically had an officer-dominated culture that resisted the development of "enlisted professionals" or NCOs, in part because of the fear it would lead to reductions in the officer corps.

=== Officers ===
Russia had 72 officer training academies that graduated around 18,000 officers annually, though this was reduced during Serdyukov's reforms in the late 2000s and early 2010s. Acacemies have a five-year term, producing leaders from platoon to battalion level. Because of the traditional lack of a non-commissioned officer corps, many of the roles of usually held by NCOs in NATO armies have been done by junior officers in the Russian and Soviet armies. In the Russian Ground Forces, the lowest professionally trained leader is a lieutenant. In the early 2000s, many junior officers did not wish to serve—in 2002, more than half the officers who left the forces did so early. Their morale was low, among other reasons because their postings were entirely in the hands of their immediate superiors and the personnel department. "... Without having to account for their actions, they can choose to promote or not promote him, to send him to Moscow or to some godforsaken post on the Chinese border."

==== Ranks and insignia ====
The newly re-emergent Russia retained most of the ranks of the Soviet Army, with some minor changes. The principal difference from the usual Western style is some variation in generals' rank titles—in at least one case, Colonel General, derived from German usage. Most of the modern rank names used in the Russian military were borrowed from existing German/Prussian, French, English, Dutch, and Polish ranks upon the formation of the modern Russian Army in the late 17th century, and have lasted with few changes of title through the Soviet period.

Officers

The rank insignia of commissioned officers.

| Rank group | General / flag officers | | | | | Senior officers | | | Junior officers |
|---|---|---|---|---|---|---|---|---|---|---|---|---|
| Russian Ground Forces |
| Russian Ground Forces | Маршал Российской Федерации; Marshal Rossiyskoy Federatsii | Генерал армии General armii | Генерал-полковник; General-polkovnik | Генерал-лейтенант; General-leytenant | Генерал-майор; General-mayor | Полковник; Polkovnik | Подполковник; Podpolkovnik | Майор; Mayor | Kапитан; Kapitan | Старший лейтенант Starshiy leytenant | Лейтенант; Leytenant | Mладший лейтенант Mladshiy leytenant |

Other ranks

The rank insignia of non-commissioned officers and enlisted personnel.

| Rank group | Under-officers | | NCOs | | | | Enlisted |
|---|---|---|---|---|---|---|---|---|
| Russian Ground Forces |
| Russian Ground Forces | Ста́рший пра́порщик Stárshiy práporshchik | Пра́порщик; Práporshchyk | Старшина́ Starshyná | Ста́рший сержа́нт Stárshiy serzhánt | Сержа́нт; Serzhánt | Мла́дший сержа́нт Mládshiy serzhánt | Ефре́йтор; Efréĭtor | Рядово́й; Ryadovóy |

=== Women ===
There is little available information on the current status of women, who are not conscripted, in the Russian Ground Forces. According to the BBC, there were 90,000 women in the Russian Army in 2002, though estimates on numbers of women across the entire Russian Armed Forces in 2000 ranged from 115,000 to 160,000. Women serve in support roles, most commonly in the fields of nursing, communications, and engineering. Some officers' wives have become contract service personnel. By 2013, there were 29,000 women serving in the Armed Forces, none above the rank of colonel. 3.5% served in command posts. A 2016 TASS article stated: 'At the end of the 2000s, over 90,000 women were serving in the Russian Armed Forces', but that number fell to 'about 45,000' in 2011. TASS explained this drop as follows: 'After the military authorities increased their requirements for female applicants and in connection with the overall reduction in the number of service personnel in the RF Armed Forces, this number has decreased significantly.' It appears that Defence Minister Shoigu said that 1,100 women were deployed in the Russian invasion of Ukraine in March 2023.

In late March 2023 RFE/RL published a report including testimony from a Russian female medic who had served in Ukraine. The medic said she had "experienced severe sexual harassment herself and witnessed harassment, assault, and other crimes against women serving with her [after the 2022 Russian invasion of Ukraine]. She was also told of incidents in which officers threatened and abused soldiers who were reluctant to go into combat and encountered soldiers who had mutilated themselves in an effort to be sent back home." The field wife phenomenon was widespread after Operation Barbarossa, the German Nazi invasion of the Soviet Union in 1941.

== Equipment ==
The Russian Ground Forces retain a very large quantity of vehicles and equipment. Following the collapse of the USSR, the newly independent republics became host to most of the formations with modern equipment, whereas Russia was left with lower-category units, usually with older equipment. As financial stringency began to bite harder, the amount of new equipment fell as well, and by 1998, only ten tanks and about 30 BMP infantry fighting vehicles were being purchased each year.

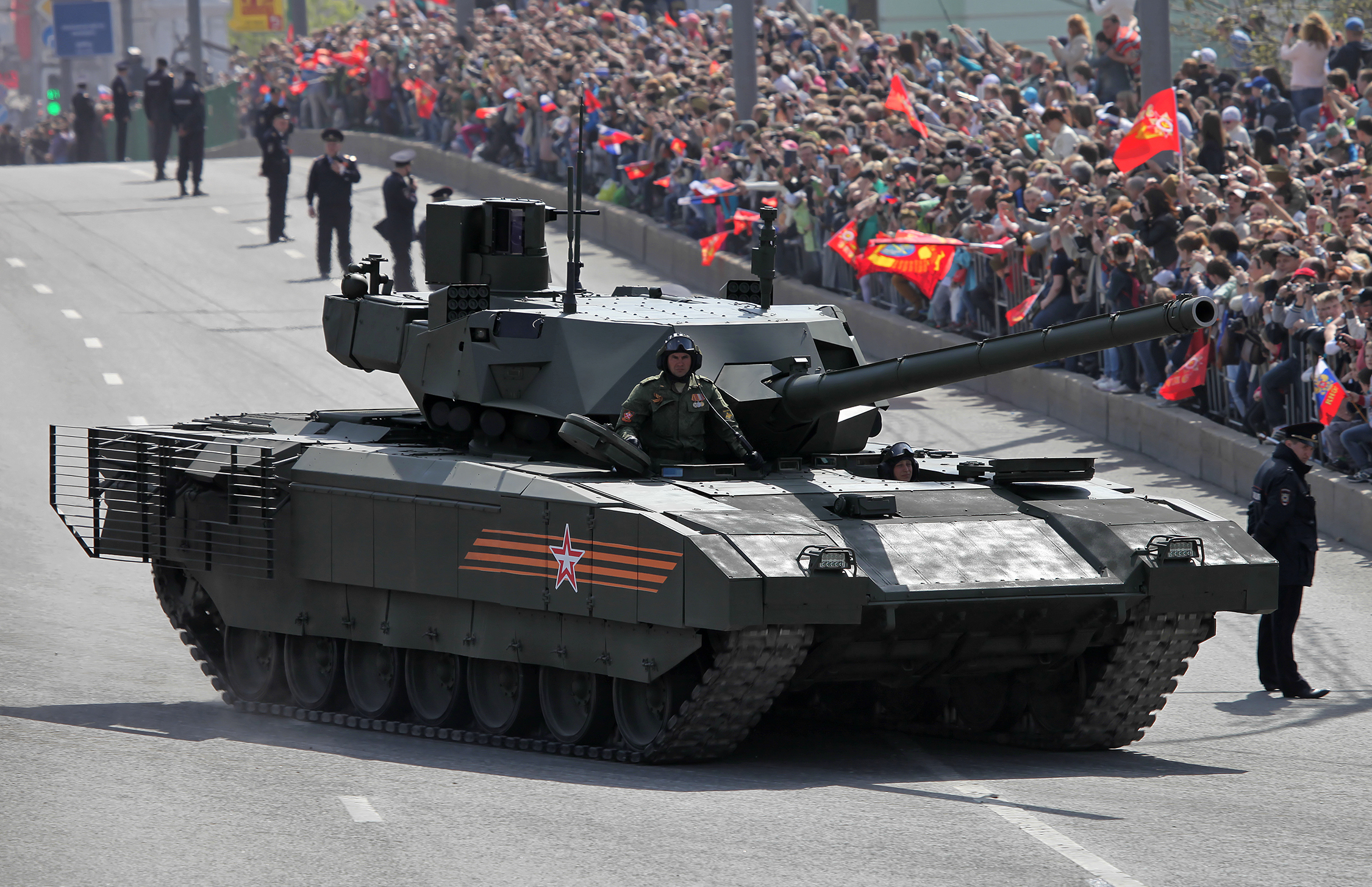
A T-14 Armata tank

Old tanks and armored vehicles such as the BMPs, BTRs like the T-72, T-90, BMP-1/2/3, and BTR-80s remain in widespread service. As of 2025, new fighting vehicles such as the Armata Universal Combat Platform, Bumerang, and Kurganets-25 have been prototyped; small numbers have been built; but have suffered extended delays entering large-scale production.

After 2016, funding for new equipment rose greatly. Two Iskander-M missile system brigade sets, over 60 Tornado-G MLRS and more than 20 Msta-SM self-propelled howitzers have been received in 2016. The Russian Ground Forces received two brigade sets of Buk-M3 and Buk-M2 air defence missile complexes in 2016. Troops also received two division sets of Tor-M2 and two of Tor-M2U air defence missile complexes. Moreover, the Forces received Verba MANPADS, more than 130 BMP-3 IFVs and BTR-82A APCs as well as more than 20 Tigr-M armored vehicles equipped with the Arbalet-DM combat module.

Russian troops have reportedly received 2,930 new or modernized systems allowing for two missile brigades, two SAM brigades and two SAM regiments, one Spetsnaz brigade, 12 motorized rifle and tank battalions, and three artillery divisions to be reequipped.

In 2022, there was a shortage of munitions. The New York Times reported in an article on 13 September 2023, citing US and European officials, that Russia was managing to overcome the international sanctions and its missile production exceeded pre-war levels. It was also reported that Russia now produces more ammunition than the United States and Europe and it can manufacture 200 tanks and two million units of ammunition in a year.

According to the Russian Ministry of Defense, the Russian Ground Forces received in 2023 several hundreds of thousands of small arms, new and repaired weapon systems, military vehicles and equipment, artillery systems, air defense systems, and also over a million individual armor protection and equipment means. CNN reported on 11 March 2024 that Russia currently produces about 250,000 artillery shells a month or about 3 million a year which is nearly three times the quantity the US and Europe produce for Ukraine. A NATO official said that Russia imports ammunition from Iran and North Korea.

Following high equipment losses in Ukraine, Russia has resorted to including low-tech equipment for military use, with the usage of donkeys, horses, and civilian cars being reported on the front by 2025.

=== Equipment summary ===
The IISS writes that its "in store" numbers indicate equipment "..held away from front-line units; readiness and training varies." Russia has 10 Central Tank Reserve Bases, at least 37 mixed equipment- and armaments-storage bases, and at least 12 artillery-storage bases.

In July–August 2022, a relatively credible assessment of Russian main battle tanks in store indicated that there might only be some 6,000 vehicles in store, of which 3,000 might be able to be reactivated. Another more exact analysis the same month estimated that "2,048 tanks are relatively combat-ready (886 of them are being preserved under dry air), 1,304 tanks are in storage, and 2,299 tanks are for disposal. A total of 5,651 tanks (of which 2,299 were to be disposed of) and 1,330 tank spaces in hangars." In February 2023, launching the 2023 edition of the Military Balance, the IISS amended their long-term storage estimate of old tanks to 5,000.

While more modern vehicles such as T-72s, T-80s, T-90s have been stored, these vehicles cannot be properly activated from store, due to a lack of preventive and corrective maintenance. Thus, instead, T-62s have been activated for use.

| Type | Active | Date | In Store | Date |
|---|---|---|---|---|
| Main battle tanks | 2,927 | 2022 | ≈10,200 | 2022 |
| Infantry fighting vehicles | 5,180 | 2022 | 8,500 | 2022 |
| Armoured personnel carriers | 6,050+ | 2022 | ≈6,000 | 2022 |
| Towed artillery | 150 | 2022 | ≈12,415 | 2022 |
| Self-propelled artillery | 1,968 | 2022 | ≈4,260 | 2022 |
| Multiple rocket launchers | 1,056 | 2022 | 3,220 | 2022 |
| Surface-to-air missile systems | 1,520 | 2022 | -- | -- |

On 24 July 2024, the Ukrainian Commander-in-chief Colonel General Oleksandr Syrskyi reported that after two and a half years of invasion the Russian Army has "doubled" the number of its tanks - from 1,700 to 3,500 - and tripled the quantity of its artillery systems while the number of its armored personnel carriers has grown from 4,500 to 8,900.

== Commanders ==
Standard of the Commander-in-Chief of the Russian Ground Forces

Commander-in-Chief (1992–1997)

- Vladimir Semyonov (1992–1997)

Chief of the Main Directorate (1998–2001)

- Yuri Bukreyev (1998–2001)

Commander-in-Chief (2001–present)

- Nikolai Kormiltsev (2001–2004)
- Aleksei Maslov (2004–2008)
- Vladimir Boldyrev (2008–2010)
- Aleksandr Postnikov-Streltsov (2010–2012)
- Vladimir Chirkin (2012–2013)
- Sergei Istrakov (2013–2014, acting)
- Oleg Salyukov (2014–2025)
- Andrey Mordvichev (2025–present)

== Ground Forces Day ==
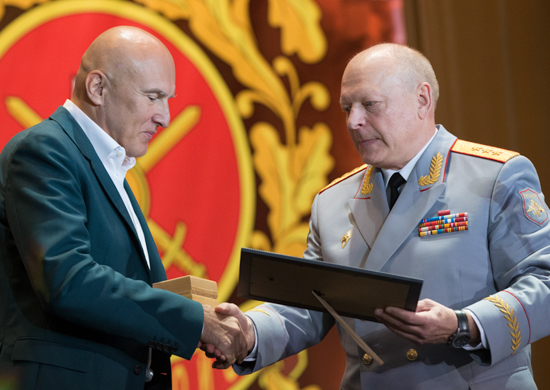
Igor Matvienko (composer of "Forward, infantry!") with Oleg Salyukov during the presentation of the anthem of the Ground Forces in 2016.

On 31 May 2006, Putin signed decree No. 549 "On the establishment of professional holidays and memorable days in the Armed Forces of the Russian Federation", according to which it was ordered to celebrate Ground Forces Day (Russian: День Сухопутных войск, romanized: Den Sukhoputnykh voysk). The date chosen for the holiday commemorates the edict made by Tsar Ivan the Terrible on 1 October 1550 on the placement in Moscow and surrounding districts of a thousand servicemen forming a local brigade of Streltsy, which essentially became a key document in the further formation and development of the Imperial Russian Army.

Ground Forces Day was first celebrated on the Preobrazhenskaya Square in Moscow in the Church of the Transfiguration of the Lord, where a bishop's service was held. Before the start of the service, an order of the Minister of Defence Sergei Shoigu and the decree of Patriarch Kirill of Moscow were read, according to which the Cathedral of the Transfiguration of the Lord officially became the main temple of the RF Ground Forces. A year later, the holiday was celebrated with the adoption of the Ground Forces Anthem.

The following holidays are also celebrated by the Ground Forces: Day of Tankmen, Day of Rocket Forces and Artillery, Day of Air Defence.

== See also ==
- Naval Infantry (Russia)
- Women in the Russian and Soviet military
- List of Russian military bases
- Awards and emblems of the Ministry of Defence of the Russian Federation
