= Vladimir Boldyrev =

Russian retired general (born 1949)

- Владимир Анатольевич Болдырев
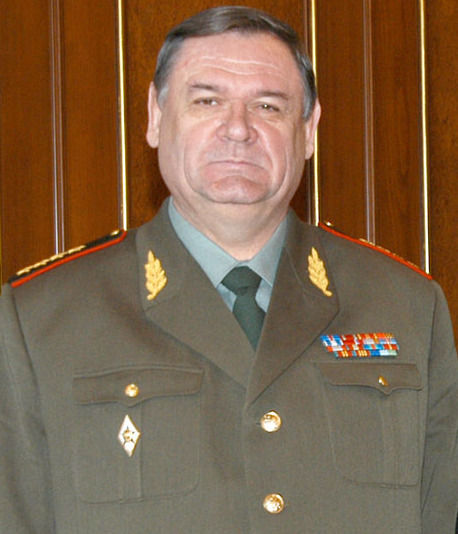
- Boldyrev in 2005
- Born: 5 January 1949 (age 77); Krasnoyarsky, Volgograd Oblast, Russian SFSR, Soviet Union
- Alma mater: Moscow Higher Military Command School; Frunze Military Academy; Russian General Staff Academy
- Military career
- Allegiance: Soviet Union (to 1991); Russia
- Branch: Soviet Army; Russian Army
- Service years: 1978–2010
- Rank: General of the Army
- Commands: Commander-in-Chief of the Russian Ground Forces; North Caucasus Military District; Siberian Military District; 6th Army
- Conflicts: Insurgency in the North Caucasus; Russo–Georgian War

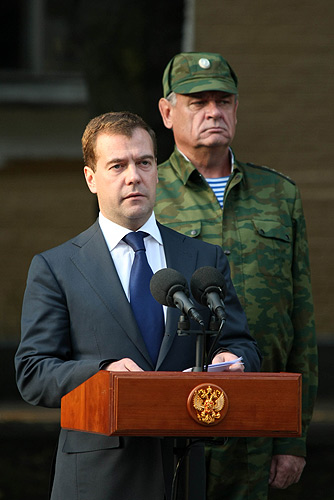
Boldyrev with President Dmitry Medvedev at an award ceremony for soldiers after the Russo-Georgian War, 2008

General of the Army Vladimir Anatolyevich Boldyrev (Note: Russian: Владимир Анатольевич Болдырев) (born 5 January 1949) is a Russian retired military officer who was the Commander-in-Chief of the Russian Ground Forces from 2008 to 2010. His other major commands included the 6th Army, the Siberian Military District, the North Caucasus Military District, and the group of Russian forces deployed to fight the Russo-Georgian War.

== Military career ==
Boldyrev was born on 5 January 1949 in Krasnoyarsky, Volgograd Oblast. He graduated the Moscow Higher Military Command School in 1971 to be commissioned as a Soviet Army officer, and initially served in the Belorussian Military District and the Central Group of Forces in Czechoslovakia. After graduating from the Frunze Military Academy in 1978 he became an operations staff officer on a field army staff. Between 1979 and 1985 Boldyrev was stationed in Mongolia, where he held roles at the regimental and division level. He was then the commander of a division in the Transbaikal Military District from 1985 to 1990, before attending the Russian General Staff Academy, which he graduated in 1992.

Boldyrev became the chief of staff of the 6th Army in the Leningrad Military District in 1992, and became the army commander in 1994. From September 1996 to December 1998 he was the first deputy commander of the Transbaikal Military District, and was also its chief of staff briefly from April to December 1998. At the end of that year, Boldyrev was appointed as first deputy commander and chief of staff of the North Caucasus Military District. In May 2001 he was made the commander of the Siberian Military District, and in December 2002 he was returned to the North Caucasus Military District, replacing Gennady Troshev as its commander. In July 2004 Boldyrev was appointed as commander of the Volga–Ural Military District. His reassignment took place a month after the June 2004 raid by Chechen militants into Nazran, Ingushetia, which resulted in 93 people killed. Boldyrev was among the several high-ranking military officials who were either removed or reassigned after this raid, with the other being the Chief of the General Staff of the Armed Forces, Anatoly Kvashnin.

In early August 2008, Boldyrev was appointed as Commander-in-Chief of the Russian Ground Forces, assuming command from Alexey Maslov. It was a personnel decision made by the new Minister of Defense, Anatoly Serdyukov. He was in that role during the Russo-Georgian War later that month, and announced that Russian forces had removed the Georgian army from Tskhinvali, to outside of the zone previously held by Russian peacekeepers. Boldyrev was in command of the group of Russian forces that was fighting in the war with Georgia, with his headquarters coordinating operations from Vladikavkaz. In September 2009, he announced that control over army aviation would be returned to the Ground Forces from the Russian Air Force.

Boldyrev was removed from his post and retired in January 2010, officially because of his age. State Duma deputy Viktor Ilyukhin criticized the decision of the defense minister to replace Boldyrev, saying that "in the Armed Forces there are very few generals who could command strategic operations. Boldyrev is a talented general, and has a lot of experience commanding forces."

== Later life ==
After his retirement from active duty, he became a member of the Office of Inspectors General. When the head of Chechnya Ramzan Kadyrov and Wagner Group leader Yevgeny Prigozhin publicly criticized Aleksandr Lapin, who was in command of the forces defeated during the 2022 Kharkiv counteroffensive, Boldyrev told them that they did not have the right to do that, saying that only the president and defense minister did. Kadyrov responded to him by saying that he had been removed as the head of the North Caucasus Military District for not being capable, which Boldyrev said was not true.

In May 2024, after the general Ivan Popov was arrested on charges of fraud, Boldyrev commented that it was "very surprising," saying that he had known Popov to be a competent and capable commander, and that Popov would never have done such a thing.

== Awards and decorations ==
- Order of Saint George, 2nd class
- Order of Military Merit

== Notes ==
Military offices
| Preceded by Yuri Yakubov | Commander of the 6th Army; 1994–1996 | Succeeded by Vyacheslav Sukharev |
| Preceded by Nikolai Kormiltsev | First Deputy Commander of the Transbaikal Military District; 1996–1998 | Position abolished |
| Preceded by Viktor Kazantsev | Chief of Staff of the Transbaikal Military District; 1998 | Position abolished |
| Preceded by Aleksandr Morozov | Chief of Staff of the Siberian Military District; 1998–2001 | Succeeded by Vladimir Bakin |
| Preceded by Nikolai Kormiltsev | Commander of the Siberian Military District; 2001–2002 | Succeeded by Nikolai Makarov |
| Preceded by Gennady Troshev | Commander of the North Caucasus Military District; 2002–2004 | Succeeded by Aleksandr Baranov |
| Preceded by Aleksandr Baranov | Commander of the Volga–Ural Military District; 2004–2008 | Succeeded by Arkady Bakhin |
| Preceded by Alexey Maslov | Commander-in-Chief of the Russian Ground Forces; 2008–2010 | Succeeded by Aleksandr Postnikov |
