= Joint Group of Forces in Ukraine =

Joint Group of Forces (Troops) in Ukraine
- Объединённая группировка войск (сил) на Украине
- Active: 2022-present
- Country: Russia
- Size: 617 000 (December 2023)
- Part of: General Staff of the AF RF
- Nickname: OGV (s)
- Engagements: Russian invasion of Ukraine

Commanders
- Current commander: Army general Valery Gerasimov
- Notable commanders: Army general Sergey Surovikin

Joint Group of Forces in Ukraine is an inter-service operational-strategic formation of the Armed Forces of the Russian Federation created during the Russian invasion of Ukraine.

== History ==
At the initial stage of the invasion of Ukraine, four groups of troops were formed, corresponding to the four military districts of Russia. By the late autumn of 2022, they were assigned to sections of the existing front line.

On October 8, 2022, the Joint Group of Forces was established, and the Minister of Defence, Sergey Shoigu, appointed General of the Army Sergey Surovikin as commander.

After the retreat from Kherson in November 2022, the "Dnepr" group was created. It was formed mainly from units of the Southern Military District and attached units of the Airborne Forces and was responsible for the left bank of the Dnieper — the “Kherson direction”.

On 11 January 2023, Chief of the General Staff Valery Gerasimov was appointed commander, Surovikin became one of his three deputies, along with Oleg Salyukov and Aleksey Kim. On 17 March 2023, Vladimir Putin appointed Major General of Justice Alexey Naida as Military Prosecutor of the Joint Group of Forces.

As of December 2023, According to Vladimir Putin, 617 000 servicemen were in the "area of military action" in Ukraine.

In April 2024, it was reported that the Northern Group of Forces was being formed under the command of Colonel General Alexander Lapin, which included the Belgorod, Kursk, and Bryansk groups. In August, Defense Minister Andrey Belousov announced the reestablishment of these groups.

== Command structure and frontline areas ==
Composition:

- Headquarters of the OGV (s) — Rostov-on-Don
  - The West group of forces is in the Kupiansk direction, from the state border to the Svatovo area.
  - The Center group of forces is responsible for the Lyman and Pokrovsk directions.
  - The South group of forces is responsible for the Donetsk direction, including the Bakhmut area.
  - The East group of forces is in the South Donetsk direction, reaching the Rabotino — Verbovoye — Novofedorovka area.
  - The Dnipro group of forces - Kherson direction, west of Rabotino and along the Dnieper.
  - The North group of forces is responsible for the Kursk and Kharkiv directions from 2024.
    - The Belgorod, Kursk, and Bryansk military groups.

Commanders

- General of the Army Sergey Surovikin (October 8, 2022 - January 11, 2023)
- General of the Army Valery Gerasimov (January 11, 2023 - present)
