= Vladimir Bulgakov =

Russian general (born 1949)

- Владимир Васильевич Булгаков
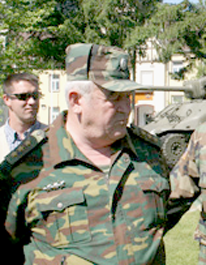
- Bulgakov in 2005
- Born: 1 January 1949 (age 77); Belaya Kalitva, Rostov Oblast, Russian SFSR, Soviet Union
- Education: Tashkent Higher Tank Command School; Malinovsky Military Armored Forces Academy; Russian General Staff Academy
- Military career
- Allegiance: Soviet Union (to 1991); Russia
- Branch: Soviet Army; Russian Ground Forces
- Service years: 1967–2009
- Rank: Colonel General
- Commands: Far Eastern Military District
- Conflicts: Soviet–Afghan War; First Chechen War; Second Chechen War
- Awards: Hero of the Russian Federation

Colonel General Vladimir Vasilyevich Bulgakov (Note: Russian: Владимир Васильевич Булгаков) (born 1 January 1949) is a Russian retired military officer. He last served as the commander of the Far Eastern Military District from 2006 to 2009, and previously as the Deputy Commander-in-Chief of the Russian Ground Forces from 2003 to 2006. His last promotion was to colonel general in 2001 and was awarded the title Hero of the Russian Federation in 2000.

== Biography ==
Vladimir Bulgakov was born on 1 January 1949 in Belaya Kalitva. His father Vasily Nikolayevich was a front-line soldier who worked at mine No. 34 as a coal miner, and his mother Anna Panteleyevna was a housewife.

Bulgakov graduated from the Ordzhonikidze Suvorov Military School in Ordzhonikidze (now Vladikavkaz) in 1967, and joined the Soviet Army that same year. From 1967 to 1971, he was a cadet of the Tashkent Higher Tank Command School. After graduation in the summer 1971, he commanded a tank platoon, a tank company and a tank battalion in the Central Group of Forces in Czechoslovakia. The military ranks of senior lieutenant, captain and lieutenant colonel were awarded ahead of schedule.

In 1979, Major Bulgakov graduated from the Military Academy of Armored Forces named after Marshal of the Soviet Union R. Ya. Malinovsky. He served as chief of staff - deputy commander of a motorized rifle regiment, commander of a tank regiment. From 1985 to 1987 he fought in Afghanistan during the Soviet–Afghan War, being a military adviser to the commander of an Afghan infantry division.

In 1987, Bulgakov became the chief of staff - deputy commander of a motor rifle division in the Byelorussian Military District (Grodno). In 1989, he became the commander of the 6th Guards Motor Rifle Division in the Northern Group of Forces in Poland. In 1993, he became the commander of the 166th Separate Guards Motor Rifle Brigade of the Moscow Military District, formed from the division. In 1995, he was the Deputy Commander of the 58th Combined Arms Army of the North Caucasus Military District. He was an active participant in the hostilities during the First Chechen War, he led the fighting in the spring and summer of 1995 in the mountainous part of Chechnya, in particular, operations to capture the regional centers of Vedeno and Shatoi. He used very successfully used tactical helicopter landings.

In 1997, Bulgakov graduated from the Military Academy of the General Staff of the Armed Forces of Russia and was appointed commander of the 8th Guards Army Corps of the North Caucasus Military District in Volgograd. In December 1998, he became the Deputy Commander of the North Caucasian Military District for Emergency Situations. In this position, in August 1999, he participated in repelling the invasion of Chechen fighters into the Republic of Dagestan, in October 1999, he participated in the Second Chechen War. From October 1999, he commanded the troops of the operational group "North", from December 1999 - the troops of the operational group "Grozny", from February to March 2000, the troops of the operational group "Center" (operated in the Shatoi region of Chechnya). He was the direct leader of the battles for the storming of Grozny in January 2000.

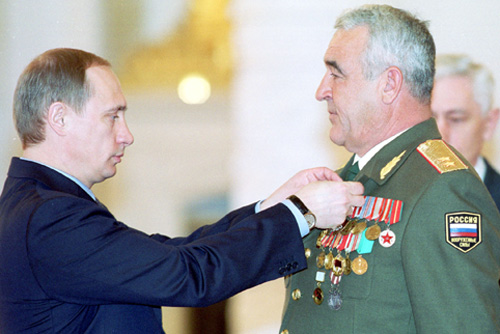
Vladimir Putin awarding the title Hero of the Russian Federation on 24 March 2000

Bulgakov was awarded the title Hero of the Russian Federation on 24 March 2000. On 28 March 2000, Bulgakov became the Chief of Staff and First Deputy Commander of the North Caucasian Military District. In July 2003, he became the Deputy Commander-in-Chief of the Ground Forces. On 8 September 2006, Bulgakov became the Commander of the Far Eastern Military District. In January 2009, left the post as the commander the Far Eastern Military District. He currently lives in the city of Rostov-on-Don.

Bulgakov is a candidate of military sciences.

== See also ==
- List of Heroes of the Russian Federation

== Notes ==
Military offices
Preceded by Aleksandr Baranov	Chief of Staff and First Deputy Commander of the North Caucasus Military District; 2000–2003	Succeeded by Alexey Maslov
Preceded by Vladimir Moltenskoy	Deputy Commander-in-Chief of the Russian Ground Forces; 2003–2006	Succeeded by Valery Yevnevich
Preceded by Yuri Yakubov	Commander of the Far Eastern Military District; 2006–2008	Succeeded by Oleg Salyukov
