= Kormiltsev =

Kormiltsev (Russian: Кормильцев) is a Russian masculine surname originating from the word kormilets meaning breadwinner; its feminine counterpart is Kormiltseva. The surname may refer to:

- Ilya Kormiltsev (1959–2007), Russian poet, translator, and publisher
- Marina Mokhnatkina (née Kormiltseva in 1988), Russian sambo and mixed martial competitor
- Nikolai Kormiltsev (born 1946), Russian military officer
- Sergei Kormiltsev (born 1979), Russian football coach and former player
