= Nikolai Makarov (general) =

Russian military officer (born 1949)

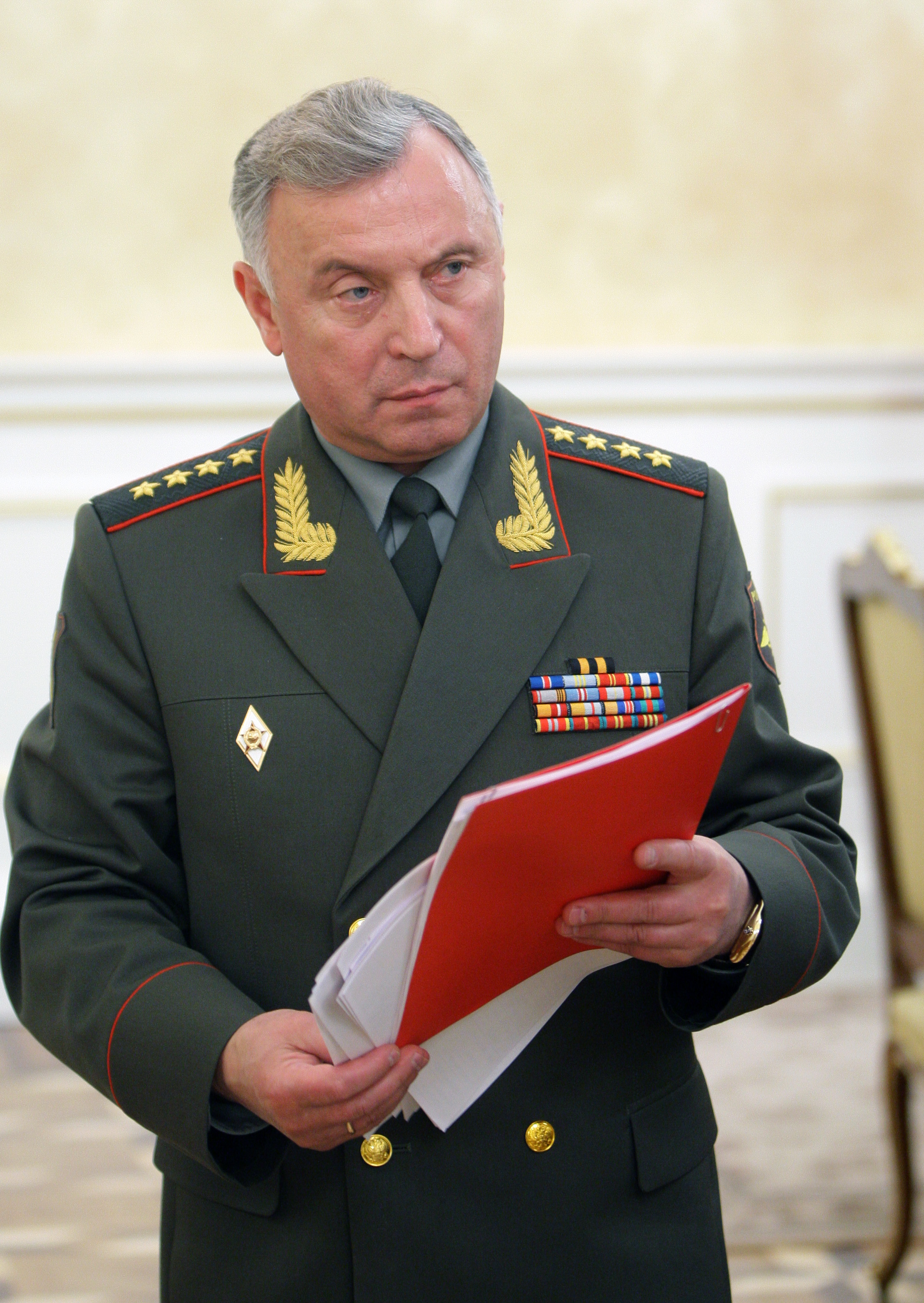
- Makarov in 2010
- Native name: Николай Макаров
- Born: 7 October 1949 (age 76); Glebovo-Gorodishche, Ryazan Oblast, Russian SFSR, Soviet Union
- Allegiance: Soviet Union (to 1991); Russia
- Branch: Soviet Army; Russian Ground Forces
- Service years: 1967–2012
- Rank: General of the Army
- Commands: 201st Military Base; 2nd Guards Tank Army; Siberian Military District; General Staff of the Armed Forces of the Russian Federation
- Conflicts: Russo-Georgian War; Insurgency in the North Caucasus
- Awards: Hero of the Russian Federation; Order of St. George; Order of Military Merit
- Alma mater: Moscow Higher Combined Arms Command School; Frunze Military Academy; Russian General Staff Academy

General of the Army Nikolai Yegorovich Makarov (Note: Russian: Никола́й Его́рович Мака́ров, IPA: [nʲɪkɐˈlaj jɪˈgorəvʲɪtɕ mɐˈkarəf]) (born 7 October 1949) is a Russian retired military officer who served as Chief of the General Staff of the Russian Armed Forces and First Deputy Minister of Defence from 2008 to 2012.

Makarov was born in the Ryazan Oblast and graduated from the Moscow Higher Combined Arms Command School in 1971. After becoming a Soviet Army officer he commanded motorized rifle units from the platoon to the division level before becoming the chief of staff of the Joint Group of Russian Forces in Tajikistan in 1993. He held other senior posts, including as commander of the 2nd Guards Tank Army and later the Ground and Coastal Forces of the Baltic Fleet, a new formation that he was tasked with organizing on the basis of the former 11th Guards Army. From 1999 to 2002 Makarov was the chief of staff of the Moscow Military District, also briefly serving as its acting commander in 2001, and from 2002 he led the Siberian Military District until 2007.

He was the Director of Armaments of the Armed Forces and Deputy Minister of Defense from 2007 to 2008, when he was appointed the Chief of the General Staff to assist the new Minister of Defense Anatoly Serdyukov with implementing his major reform of the Russian military. As the Chief of the General Staff he oversaw the Russo-Georgian War in 2008 and implemented the military reform, which also became known as the "Serdyukov-Makarov reform." The largest change it brought about was the reorganization of the Russian Ground Forces from a division-based mass mobilization structure to a brigade-based permanent readiness structure. A few days after Serdyukov was replaced by Sergey Shoigu, the new defense minister appointed a replacement for Makarov.

== Early life and education ==
Nikolai Makarov was born on 7 October 1949 in the village of Glebovo-Gorodishche, Ryazan Oblast, in the Russian Soviet Federative Socialist Republic. After completing school he originally planned to attend the Moscow Institute of Steel and Alloys, but decided to apply to the Moscow Higher Combined Arms Command School instead after being recommended to do so by a friend. Makarov graduated from there and became a Soviet Army officer in 1971. His military education also includes graduating from the Frunze Military Academy, where he received the Kutuzov scholarship, in 1979, and the General Staff Academy in 1993.

== Early military career ==
Makarov began his career in 1971 by commanding a motor rifle platoon, company, and battalion in the Group of Soviet Forces in Germany. After completing the Frunze Military Academy in 1979 he served for the next decade in the Transbaikal Military District, and while he was there he received his next promotions to the ranks of major, lieutenant colonel, and colonel earlier than normal. Makarov became a deputy regiment commander, deputy division commander, and, at the age of 34, a motorized rifle division commander before attending the General Staff Academy. During his time in the Transbaikal Military District he was also elected as a people's deputy on the Ulan-Ude city council. After completing the General Staff Academy in 1993 Makarov was a major general and served as the chief of staff of the Joint Group of Russian Forces in Tajikistan.

== High command ==
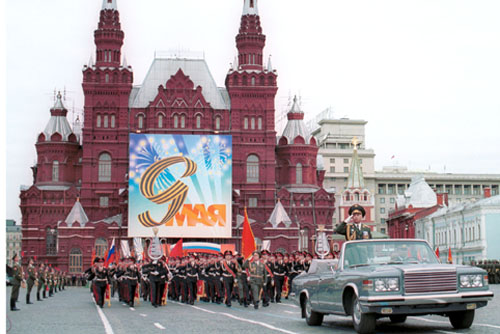
Makarov (in the car) leading the 9 May 2001 Victory Day parade

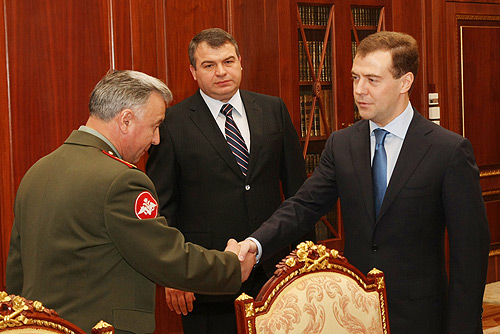
Makarov appointed by President Dmitry Medvedev as Chief of the General Staff

In the mid-1990s he served as the chief of staff and first deputy commander of the 11th Guards Army in Kaliningrad Oblast before being reassigned to the Volga-Ural Military District and serving in the same type of post. In 1996 Makarov became the commander of the 2nd Guards Tank Army. Starting from January 1998, Makarov was the commander of the Ground and Coastal Forces of the Russian Navy's Baltic Fleet, the only formation of this kind in the armed forces at the time. He was tasked with reorganizing the former 11th Guards Army into the Ground and Coastal Forces of the Baltic Fleet and successfully carried it out. While he was at that post Makarov also took part in the "Zapad 1999" war game in the summer of that year, where he was with the Russian Minister of Defense, Marshal Igor Sergeyev.

In September 1999, Lieutenant General Makarov was assigned as the Chief of Staff – First Deputy Commander of the Moscow Military District. Between March and July 2001 he was the acting Commander of the Moscow Military District, and by this time held the rank of colonel general. In this capacity Makarov was the parade commander for the 2001 Moscow Victory Day Parade on 9 May, appointed by a decree of President Vladimir Putin.

Colonel General Makarov became the commander of the Siberian Military District in December 2002, which a few years earlier had also absorbed the Transbaikal Military District. Makarov's appointment to the post came when another general, Gennady Troshev, refused to take the position. As the head of the military district Makarov worked with the military clergy, became the first district commander to establish parents' committees, and personally supervised the work of the military offices responsible for conscription. He also became the first military district commander to answer questions in a live press conference broadcast on the Internet, in December 2005, where he answered questions from service members, their family members, and others. The conference was held with the help of TASS Siberia. Also in 2005 he was promoted to the rank general of the army.

In April 2007 Makarov became the Director of Armaments of the Armed Forces and a Deputy Minister of Defense. He was appointed to this position by the new civilian Minister of Defense, Anatoly Serdyukov, who took office a month earlier. After Serdyukov became Defense Minister there was a lot of disagreement between him and the Chief of the General Staff, Army General Yuri Baluyevsky, over the minister's changes to the military command structure. In this context, Baluyevsky stepped down from his post and Nikolai Makarov was chosen to replace him the Chief of the General Staff in June 2008. Serdyukov saw Makarov as easier to work with and thought he would help him implement major reforms in the Russian armed forces.

=== Chief of the General Staff ===
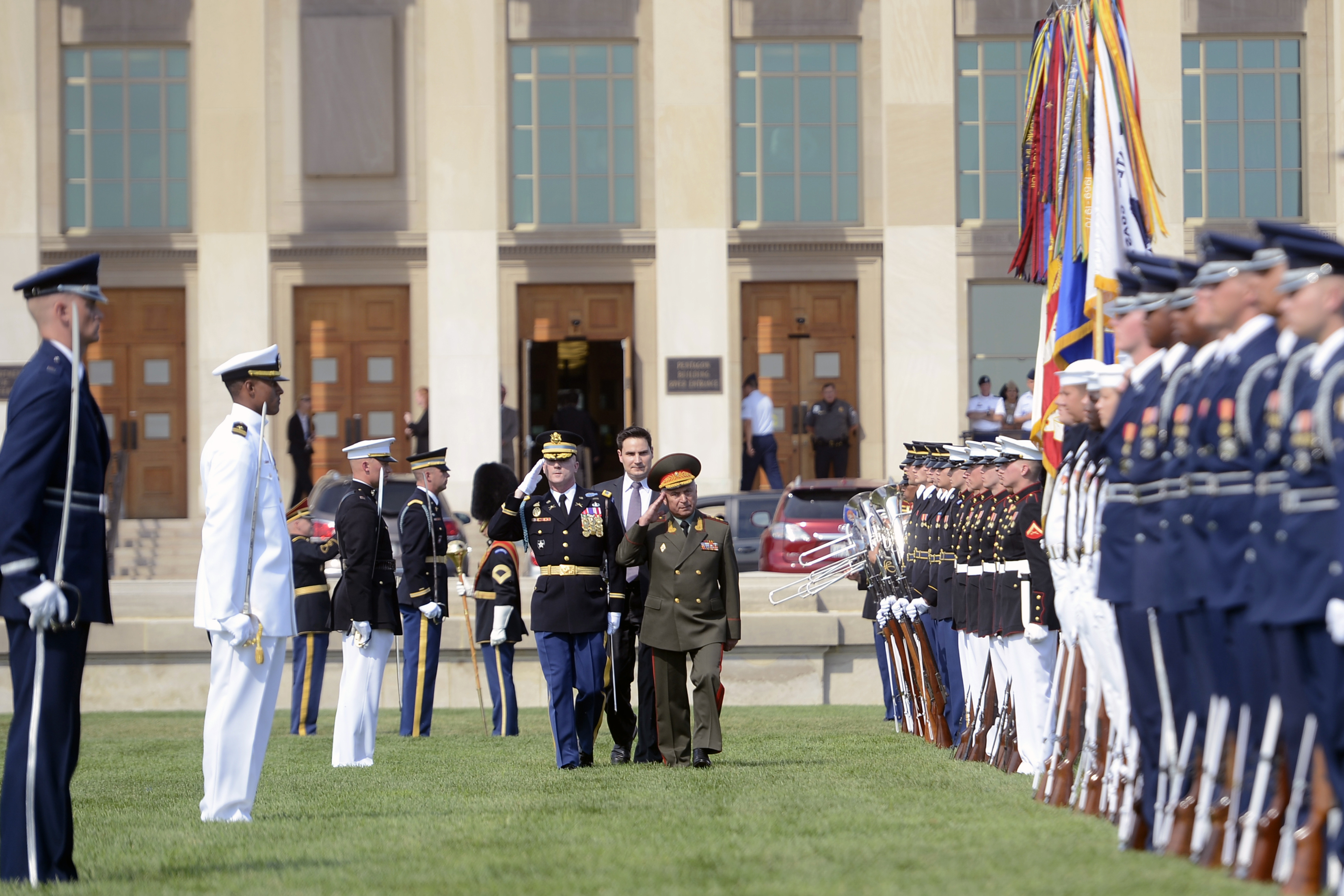
Makarov with an honor guard at The Pentagon

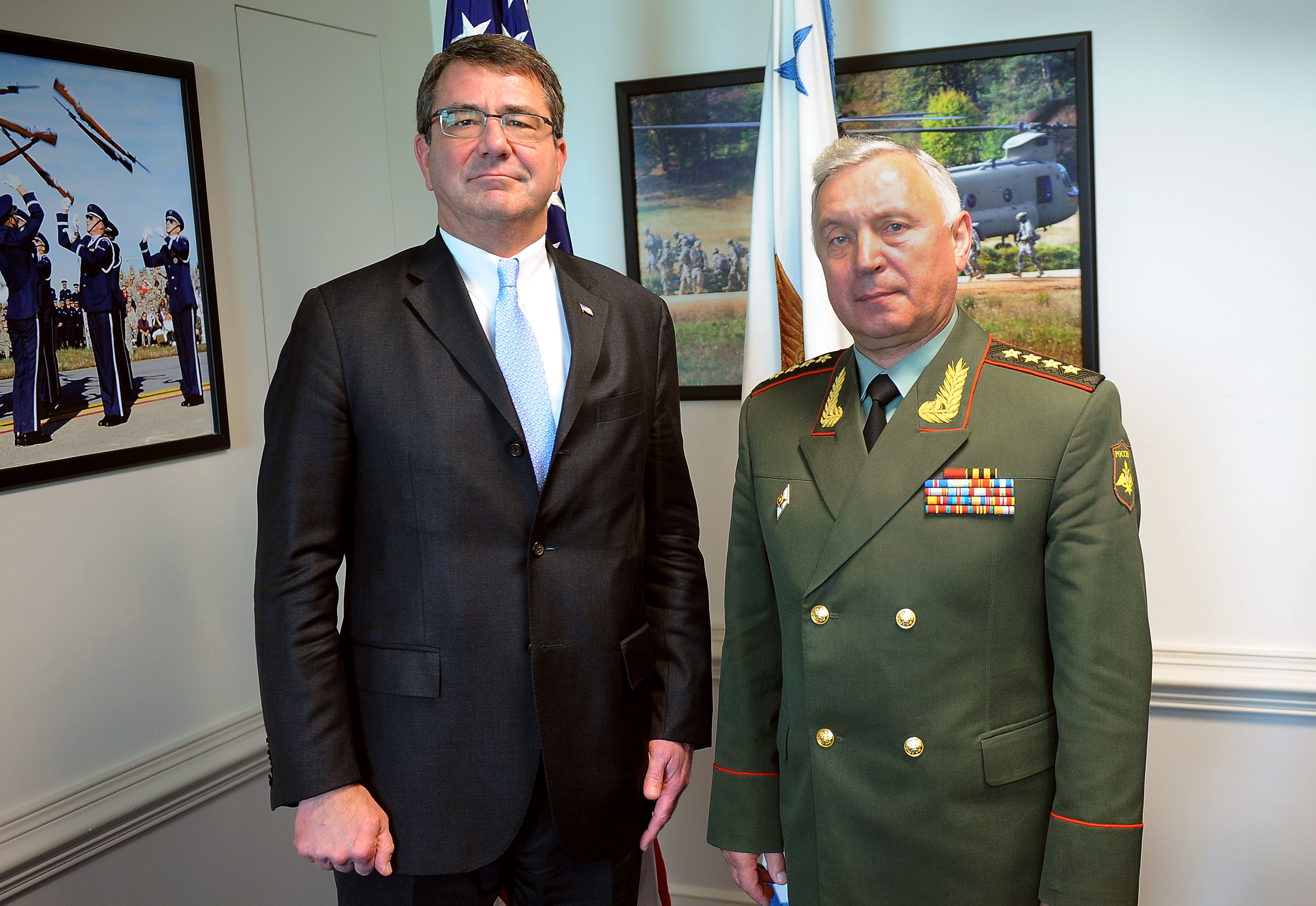
Makarov with U.S. Deputy Defense Secretary Ash Carter

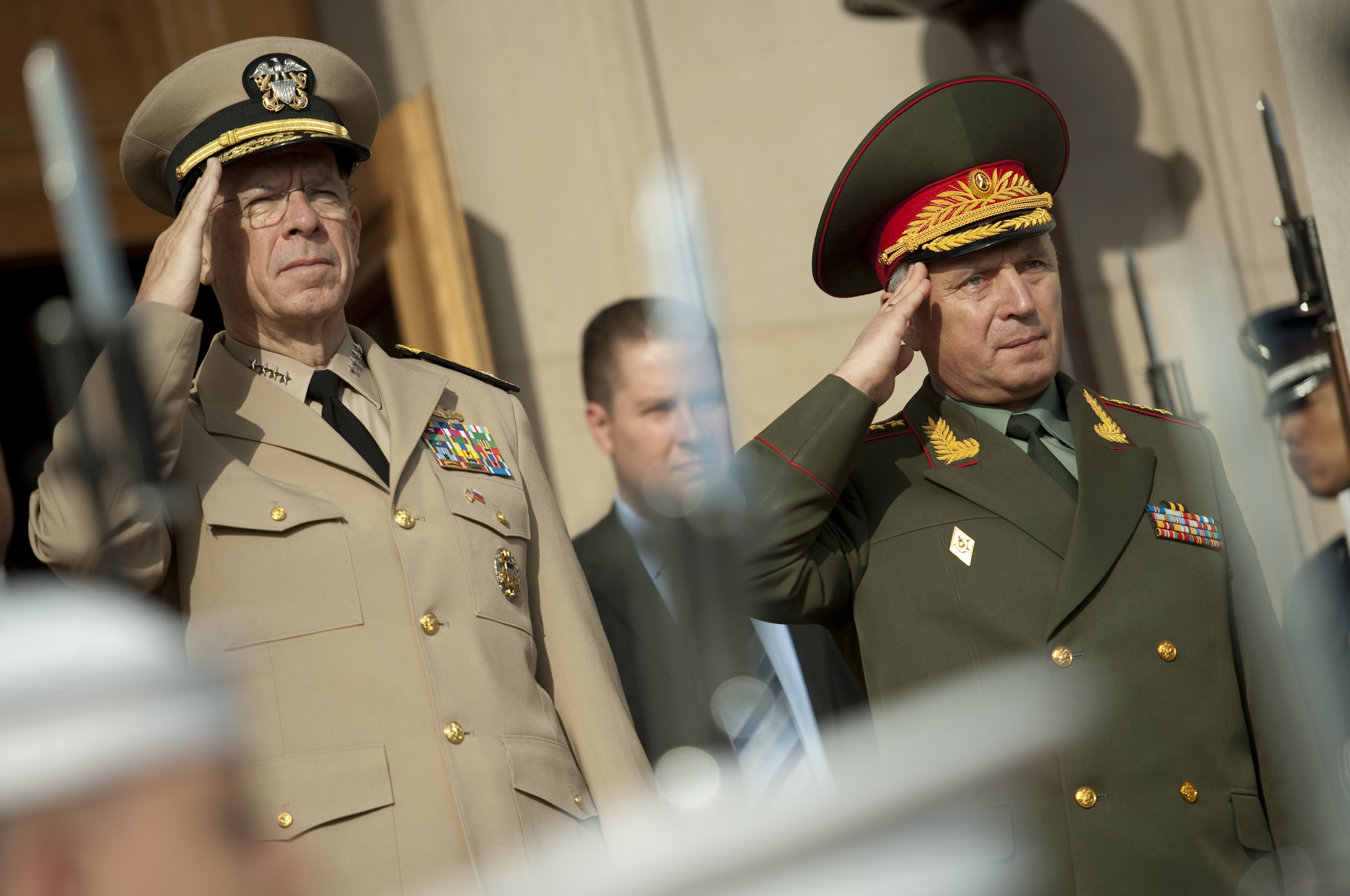
Makarov and Admiral Mike Mullen at The Pentagon in 2012

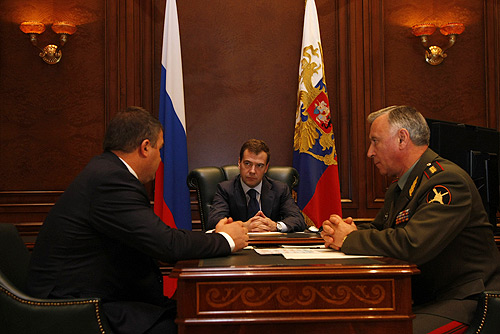
Makarov with President Dmitry Medvedev and Anatoly Serdyukov

Makarov was appointed the Chief of the General Staff and First Deputy Minister of Defense on 3 June 2008 by President Dmitry Medvedev. As the Chief of the General Staff, Makarov was responsible for the implementation of the 2008 Russian military reform, along with Minister of Defense Serdyukov, who was Russia's first true civilian defense minister. Because of that the reform is also sometimes called the "Serdyukov–Makarov reform." It was announced in October 2008, not long after the Russo-Georgian War in August. Speaking about the Russian military in the conflict with Georgia, General Makarov said that "it is impossible to not notice a certain gap between theory and practice." He also noted that the Georgian and Chechen wars showed that the existing Russian military structure of armies, divisions, regiments, and battalions was inefficient, and that brigades could replace the parts of divisions and regiments that were put together into groups to be sent into combat.

The main goal of the reform was to modernize the Russian military, make the Ground Forces more mobile, and to streamline the command system. This was to be achieved by changing the organizational structure from the Soviet mass mobilization model to a permanent readiness model, which included making brigades the main unit instead of divisions, reducing the number of military districts, and reducing the number of troops, especially the number of officers. Other goals were to improve military training, provide more advanced equipment, and improve the living standards and support for military personnel. The Ground Forces saw the most changes, though the other branches also had their numbers of units and officers reduced. All "cadre" units, which were manned in peacetime by officers and NCOs, and were to be filled up with reservists in a mass mobilization, were eliminated entirely so that the military consisted only of permanent readiness units. Makarov said that these changes will create a "modern, well armed, mobile armed force that could meet present and future challenges." He also believed that Russia should acquire certain military technology from abroad, such as drones. In March 2011, Makarov said in a speech at the Academy of Military Science that the Russian Ground Forces should have 425,000 troops, with about 10–15 percent being conscripts.

Makarov made a statement about the result of the ongoing reform in December 2009. By then, new operational strategic commands were formed in military districts, Air Force aviation regiments and divisions were replaced by air bases, and a submarine command was created in the Navy. The number of officers was reduced from 355,000 to 150,000. Also that year, Ground Forces divisions were disbanded and 85 brigades were created. In 2011 it was reported that 160 generals and colonels in Moscow were dismissed from service after refusing to be transferred from the capital to other regions. They were in disagreement with Makarov, who thought that officers should not spend too much of their career in Moscow. In early 2012 Makarov gave an order to establish the Special Operations Forces Command.

Makarov also made a significant amount of international trips. He met with his American counterpart, the U.S. Chairman of the Joint Chiefs of Staff, on several occasions, including Admiral Mike Mullen in October 2008, June 2009, January 2010, May 2011, and September 2011; and General Martin Dempsey in July 2012. Their talks focused on U.S.-Russia military cooperation and the New START treaty negotiations. In January 2012, Makarov visited the NATO headquarters in Belgium, where he met with the Supreme Allied Commander Europe, Admiral James Stavridis, and attended a meeting of the NATO-Russia Council.

He said in early 2012 that his reforms successfully reorganized the military, and that the next Chief of the General Staff could focus on re-equipping the military with advanced technology. Makarov's tenure was the Chief of the General Staff was extended by President Medvedev in October 2009 and by President Putin in July 2012. In March 2012 he was awarded the title Hero of the Russian Federation by the president. The way this was done was criticized by Nikolai Kolomeitsev, a member of the State Duma Defense Committee and opponent of the military reform, who questioned the granting of the award in secretive circumstances. The head of the Defense Committee, Vladimir Komoyedov, said that it was "unethical."

On 9 November 2012 Makarov was removed from his post by President Vladimir Putin and retired from the military, three days after the removal of Defense Minister Serdyukov over an alleged corruption scandal relating to military procurement. Colonel General Valery Gerasimov, who had been Makarov's deputy chief from 2010 to 2012, was appointed as his replacement, being the choice of the new defense minister, Sergey Shoigu.

== Retirement ==
After his dismissal, he was appointed as an aide to the Defense Minister Sergei Shoigu as an Analyst under the Office of Inspectors General in March 2013.

== Awards ==
Throughout his career, Makarov received several honors and awards:

Russia

- Hero of the Russian Federation
- Order of Saint George, 2nd class
- Order of Merit to the Fatherland, 4th class
- Order of Military Merit
- Order "For Service to the Motherland in the Armed Forces of the USSR", 3rd class
- Honored Military Specialist of the Russian Federation

Mongolia

- Order of the Polar Star (February 2010)

Belarus

- Order of Friendship of Peoples (31 March 2010)

== Personal life ==
Makarov is married.

== See also ==
- List of Heroes of the Russian Federation
- New Look military reforms

== Citations ==
Military offices
| Preceded by Aleksandr Baranov | Commander of the 2nd Guards Tank Army; 1996–1997 | Succeeded by Valery Ageyev |
| Preceded by Position established | Commander of the Ground and Coastal Forces of the Baltic Fleet; 1998–1999 | Succeeded by Vladimir Bakin |
| Preceded by Ivan Yefremov | Chief of Staff and First Deputy Commander of the Moscow Military District; 1999–2002 | Succeeded by Viktor Shemetov |
| Preceded by Igor Puzanov | Commander of the Moscow Military District; Acting; 2001 | Succeeded by Ivan Yefremov |
| Preceded by Vladimir Boldyrev | Commander of the Siberian Military District; 2002–2007 | Succeeded by Aleksandr Postnikov |
| Preceded by Alexei Moskovsky | Director of Armaments of the Armed Forces; 2007–2008 | Succeeded by Vladimir Popovkin |
| Preceded by Yuri Baluyevsky | Chief of the General Staff of the Armed Forces of the Russian Federation; 2008–2012 | Succeeded by Valery Gerasimov |
