= Ivan Yefremov (general) =

Russian military officer (born 1946)

Ivan Ivanovich Yefremov
- Иван Иванович Ефремов
- Born: 26 January 1946 (age 80); Prazdnichata, Salobelyaksky District, Kirov Oblast, Russian SFSR, Soviet Union
- Military career
- Allegiance: Soviet Union; Russia
- Branch: Soviet Army; Russian Ground Forces
- Service years: 1963-2007
- Rank: Army General
- Commands: 22nd Guards Army; Moscow Military District; Military University of the Ministry of Defence; Military Academy of the General Staff
- Awards: Order "For Merit to the Fatherland", Fourth Class; Order of Military Merit; Order of the Red Star; Order "For Service to the Homeland in the Armed Forces of the USSR", Third Class

Ivan Ivanovich Yefremov (Russian: Иван Иванович Ефремов; born 26 January 1946) is a retired Russian military officer. He was born in the Kirov Oblast of the RSFSR. He joined the Soviet Army in 1963 at the age of 17. He graduated from the Ulyanovsk Guards Higher Tank Command School four years later. He later graduated from the Malinovsky Military Armored Forces Academy in 1976 and the Military Academy of the General Staff in 1988. During his service after graduating the armored forces academy, he served at the Southern Group of Forces in the Hungarian People's Republic, heading the tank division there. He later went on to serve at the Volga Military District and the Transbaikal Military District, the latter of which he served as the First Deputy Commander of in the 90s. In November 1996, he became the First Deputy Commander of the Moscow Military District. In August 1999, he became the Head of the Military University of the Ministry of Defense of the Russian Federation. On 16 April 2001, he was the appointed head of the Main Directorate of Personnel of the Ministry of Defense of Russia. On 12 July of that year, he replaced General Nikolay Makarov as the commander of the military district.

The rank of General of the Army conferred upon Yefremov by order of President Vladimir Putin on 22 February 2004. He commanded the 2005 Moscow Victory Day Parade held on Red Square in honor of the 60th anniversary of the end of the Second World War, a jubilee parade which was held in the presence of world leaders such as U.S. President George W. Bush, Italian Prime Minister Silvio Berlusconi and Kazakh President Nursultan Nazarbayev. By presidential decree on 6 June 2005, he was appointed head of the Military Academy of the General Staff. He is currently a leading analyst at the Office of Inspectors General of the Ministry of Defense. He is currently married with a daughter and a son.
