= Aleksandr Baranov (general) =

Russian general (1946–2025)

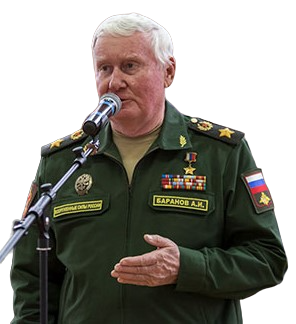
- Baranov in 2019
- Native name: Александр Баранов
- Born: 13 May 1946; Kegeyli, Karakalpak ASSR, Uzbek SSR, Soviet Union
- Died: 12 March 2025 (aged 78) Samara, Samara Oblast, Russia
- Allegiance: Soviet Union (to 1991); Russia
- Branch: Soviet Army; Russian Ground Forces
- Service years: 1963–2008
- Rank: General of the Army
- Conflicts: Second Chechen War; Insurgency in the North Caucasus
- Awards: Hero of the Russian Federation
- Education: Tashkent Higher All-Arms Command School; Frunze Military Academy; Voroshilov General Staff Academy

General of the Army Aleksandr Ivanovich Baranov (Note: Russian: Александр Иванович Баранов) (13 May 1946 – 12 March 2025) was a Russian military officer who commanded the Volga–Ural Military District from 2001 to 2004 and the North Caucasus Military District from 2004 to 2008. He served in the Second Chechen War and was a recipient of the title Hero of the Russian Federation.

== Military career ==
Baranov was born on 13 May 1946 in Kegeyli, Karakalpak Autonomous SSR, Uzbek Soviet Socialist Republic. He was an ethnic Russian. He entered the Soviet Army in 1963, and in 1967 he graduated from the Tashkent Higher Combined Arms Command School to be commissioned as an officer. Baranov served in reconnaissance, and commanded units from the platoon to battalion level. In 1977 he became a distinguished graduate of the Frunze Military Academy. After that he served with the Group of Soviet Forces in Germany, where he worked in staff and command positions at the regimental and division level. Baranov was the commander of the 24th Motor Rifle Division from 1984 to 1987 and then the first deputy commander of the 8th Tank Army. In 1991 he graduated from the Soviet General Staff Academy and was made the chief of staff and first deputy commander of the 22nd Combined Arms Army.

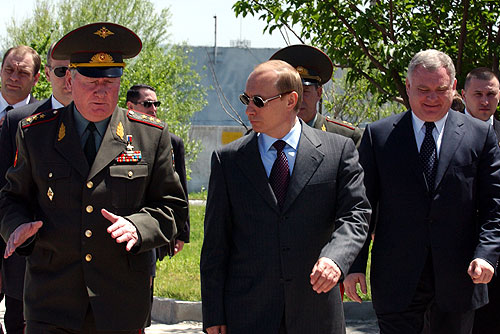
Baranov with President Vladimir Putin, 2003

In December 1994 Baranov was made the commander of the 2nd Guards Army, and in December 1996 he became the chief of staff and first deputy commander of the Volga Military District. In September 1999 he was transferred to the same position in the North Caucasus Military District and was one of the main Russian commanders during the Second Chechen War. Between March and May 2000 he was the acting commander of the Joint Group of Forces in the North Caucasus. On 5 May 2000, he was made a Hero of the Russian Federation for his service in the conflict. In the same month that the Volga and Ural Military Districts were combined, July 2001, Baranov was assigned as the chief of staff of the new Volga–Ural Military District. In July 2004 he was made the commander of the North Caucasus Military District. In that role he oversaw the operations against the insurgency in the North Caucasus and the formation of mountain units, before retiring from the military in May 2008.

=== Yandiev case ===
In July 2006, the European Court of Human Rights found the government of Russia guilty of the failure to protect from ill-treatment and a violation of the "right to life" of an alleged Chechen rebel fighter, Khadzhi-Murat Yandiev. Key evidence in the case, according to court documents, was video footage filmed by a reporter for NTV and CNN television showing an army officer, later identified as Aleksandr Baranov, ordering soldiers to "finish off" and "shoot" Yandiev after an argument between the two. Yandiev was then separated from the other prisoners and has not been seen since.

Baranov, who was questioned twice over the matter, denied he sent Yandiev to his death. He argued that his "intervention" had been meant to calm Yandiev down, and that the soldiers were not his direct subordinates and therefore could not have taken orders from him.

== Post-military ==
In retirement, he lived in Samara, Samara Oblast, and remained active in veterans' and patriotic organizations.

Baranov died in Samara, Russia, on 12 March 2025, at the age of 78.

== Honours and awards ==
Baranov was awarded the following.

- Hero of the Russian Federation (5 May 2000)
- Order of the Red Star
- Order of Military Merit
- Order "For Service to the Homeland in the Armed Forces of the USSR", 3rd class
- Honoured Military Specialist of the Russian Federation (25 July 2006)
- Honorary citizen of the Samara Oblast (4 May 2016)

== See also ==
- List of Heroes of the Russian Federation
- Second Chechen War

Military offices
Preceded by Anatoly Lipanov	Commander of the 24th Motor Rifle Division; 1984–1987	Succeeded by Nikolai Lyskin
Preceded by Vladimir Popov	Commander of the 2nd Guards Tank Army; 1994–1996	Succeeded by Nikolai Makarov
Preceded by Georgy Shpak	Chief of Staff and First Deputy Commander of the Volga Military District; 1996–1999	Succeeded by Vladimir Chilindin
Preceded by Boris Dyukov	Chief of Staff and First Deputy Commander of the North Caucasus Military District; 1999–2000	Succeeded by Vladimir Bulgakov
Preceded by Viktor Kazantsev	Commander of the Joint Group of Forces in the North Caucasus; Acting; 2000	Succeeded by Gennady Troshev
Position established	Commander of the Volga–Ural Military District; 2001–2004	Succeeded by Vladimir Boldyrev
Preceded by Vladimir Boldyrev	Commander of the North Caucasus Military District; 2004–2008	Succeeded by Sergey Makarov
