= Moscow Higher Combined Arms Command School =

Russian military academy

- Московское Высшее Общевойсковое Командное Училище
- Emblem of the academy
- Type: military academy
- Established: 1917
- Head of the School: Major General Roman Binokov
- Location: Moscow, Russia; 55°40′42″N 37°49′10″E
- Language: Russian

The Moscow Higher Combined Arms Command School "Supreme Soviet of the RSFSR" (Russian: Московское Высшее Общевойсковое Командное Училище, МВОКУ; abbreviated to MVOKU) is a higher military educational institution of the Russian Armed Forces. Alumni of the school have served with the Soviet Army and the Russian Ground Forces in many local and international deployments. The school's cadets are also known affectionately as the Kremlin Cadets or the Kremlovskie kursanty (Russian: Kремлёвские курсанты).

== History ==
=== Early decades ===
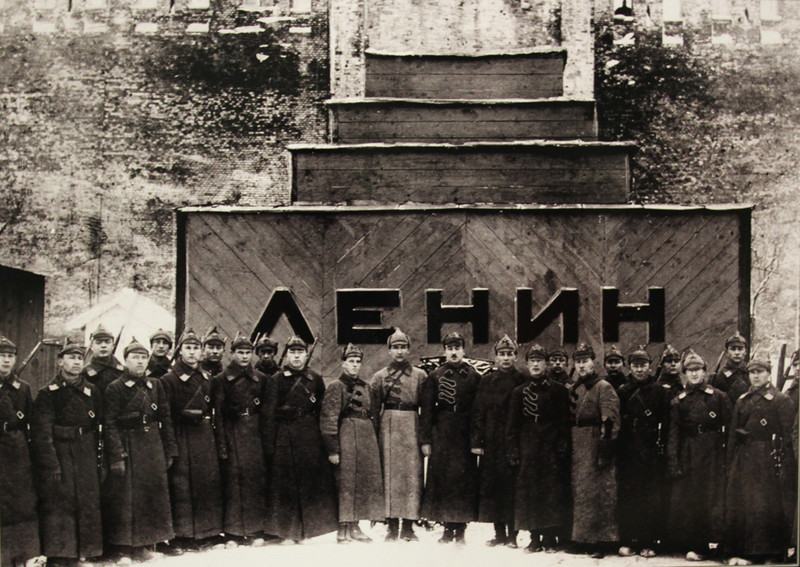
The guard of the WPRA 1st Soviet Higher Military School All-Russian Central Executive Committee at Lenin Mausoleum in 1924.

The school was formed on December 15, 1917 (O.S., December 28 N.S.), by order of Vladimir Lenin as the 1st Moscow revolutionary machine gun officers school. It later became the 1st Moscow Machine Gunners' Officers Course and "WPRA 1st Soviet Higher Military School All-Russian Central Executive Committee". In January 1919 after a year of operations, the Red Army took over the school administration. The headquarters and campus were then at the Moscow Kremlin. During that period, in 1922 Vladimir Lenin was awarded as the young institution's first honorary cadet; he was later made its only honorary commandant.

The Kremlin was its campus until 1935, when the school was moved to Moscow's Lefortovo District. At the Kremlin, the space was used by the Kremlin Regiment, now the President of Russia's escort and historical regiment. Mikhail Frunze told the cadets during a 1918 visit that the 1st SMHS and its Corps of Cadets "serves as the fighting vanguard and unfading hope of the proletariat revolution in the Russian Republic". In 1938 it received the first of its three order medals, the Order of the Red Banner, as a result of its Corps of Cadets and some alumni of the school who fought the Battle of Khalkhin Gol. During the Second World War, on the Eastern Front, cadets and faculty at the school contributed to the defense of the Moscow Region and the city itself. Many of its cadets and alumni later received state medals and decorations (several were awarded posthumously). In October 1941, the school was granted the honorary title "Supreme Soviet of the RSFSR".

=== Post-war ===
In October 1945, five months after the Allied victory in Europe and the command school's participation in the Moscow Victory Parade of 1945, it was moved to Kuzminki District in Moscow. This is its current location. In June 1958 the school was transformed into the Moscow Higher Combined Arms Command School. The school had a training period of four years. On May 7, 1965, the school was awarded the Order of Lenin. On February 21, 1978, the school was awarded the Order of the October Revolution.

=== Russian Federation ===
In 1995, the 4-year training period was lengthened to one of 5 years. In August 2004, the university was renamed as the Higher Professional Education Institution of the Ministry of Defense of the Russian Federation (and was retitled the Moscow Military Command Training School). In 2010, the school was integrated into the Combined Arms Academy of the Russian Armed Forces. In 2017, the Military Institute was removed from the Combined Arms Academy and was renamed again as the Moscow Higher Military Command School (Combined Arms). To mark its centennial year in 2017, the MHMCACS was awarded the Order of Zhukov.

On 6 October 2024, The Moscow Higher Combined Arms Command School was set on fire by a drone attack. Local residents reported gunfire and explosions.

== Traditions ==
In honor of its 1917 establishment and status as the oldest officer cadet school in Russia, since 1967 it has been the final school and military unit to mark the end of military parades in Moscow's Red Square. During the Moscow Victory Day Parade, members of the school also take part in the historical part. It also maintains privilege, granted in the 1920s, to hold graduation and commissioning parades there. From 1924 to 1935, the Corps of Cadets mounted guards of honour (No.1 Sentry) at Lenin's Mausoleum by orders of the All-Russian Central Executive Committee. In addition to Lenin, individuals honored as honorary cadets by the school were Mikhail Kalinin, Mikhail Frunze, Kliment Voroshilov, Nikolai Podvoisky, Sergey Kamenev, Avel Yenukidze, Georgy Chicherin, David Petrovsky, and Iona Yakir.

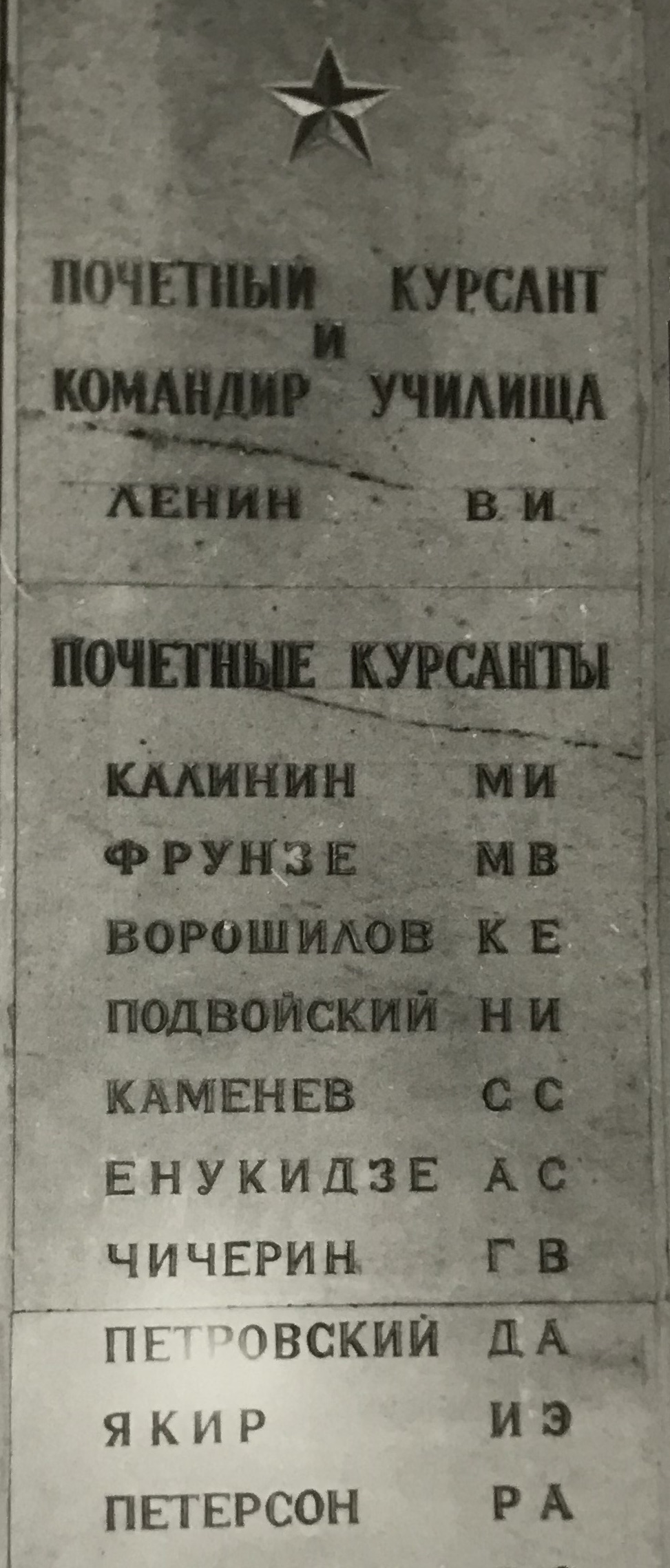
Honorable cadets of the Moscow Higher Military Command School

The MVOKU Military Band is the premier musical unit of the academy. It is part of the Military Band Service of the Armed Forces of Russia under the Ministry of Defense. It performs at military ceremonies, the unveiling of monuments, and the annual Moscow Victory Day Parade.

== Notable graduates ==
=== Soviet leaders ===
- Pyotr Koshevoy, a Marshal of the Soviet Union who took part in the Crimean Offensive and the capture of Königsberg.
- Sergey Biryuzov, Chief of the General Staff from 1963 to 1964.
- Dmitry Yazov, the last Marshal of the Soviet Union to be appointed.

=== Russian leaders ===
- Nikolai Makarov, Chief of the General Staff from 2008 to 2012.
- Vladimir Boldyrev, Commander-in-Chief of the Russian Ground Forces (2008–2010)
- Mikhail Barsukov, head of the Federal Security Service (FSB) in mid-1990s.
- Aleksandr Dvornikov, former commander of the Russian military intervention in Syria and the Russo-Ukrainian war.
- Alexei Kim, Deputy Chief of the General Staff
- Igor Sergun, Director of the Main Directorate of the General Staff (GRU) from 2011 to 2016.
- Dmitry Mironov, Aide to the President of Russia. and governor of Yaroslavl Oblast 2017 and 2021
- Andrey Lugovoy, deputy of the State Duma from the Liberal Democratic Party of Russia
- Igor Babushkin, Governor of Astrakhan Oblast since 17 September 2019.

=== Post-Soviet space ===
- Jeenbek Kulubayev, Minister of Foreign Affairs of Kyrgyzstan.
- Ruslan Khomchak, Commander-in-Chief of the Armed Forces of Ukraine (2019–2021)
- Oleksandr Syrskyi, Commander-in-Chief of the Armed Forces of Ukraine (2024–2026)
- Valery Sakhashchyk, Member of the United Transitional Cabinet for Defence and Security
- Ilyazbek Subankulov, 13th Chief of the General Staff of the Armed Forces of Kyrgyzstan
- Alexander Volfovich, incumbent State Secretary of the Security Council of Belarus
- Viktor Gulevich, former Chief of the General Staff of the Armed Forces of Belarus
- Andrei Ravkov, former State Secretary of the Security Council of Belarus and Minister of Defense.
- Colonel Ashot Hakobyan, Commander of the Honour Guard Company of the Ministry of Defense of Armenia from 1993 to 2005.

=== Other countries ===
- Kadri Hazbiu, Minister of People's Defence of Albania in 1982.
- Enrique Vilar Figueredo, Cuban volunteer who fought for the Soviet Union in World War II.

== Gallery ==
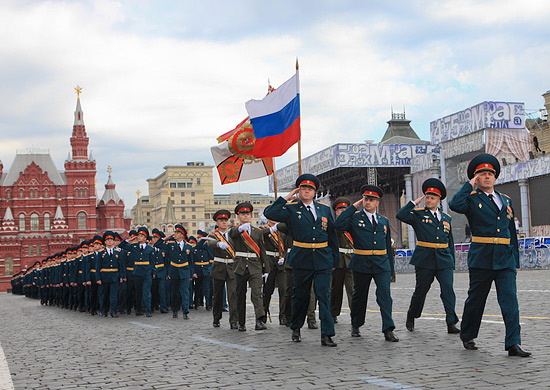
The school during a parade on Red Square

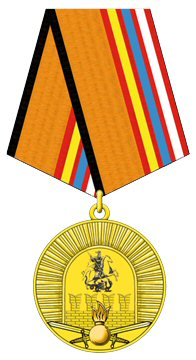
A commemorative medal celebrating 100 Years of the Moscow Higher Military Command School.

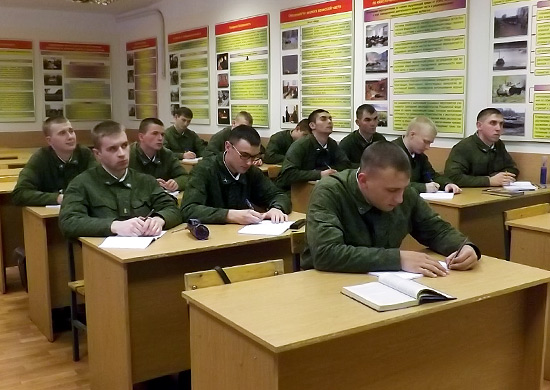

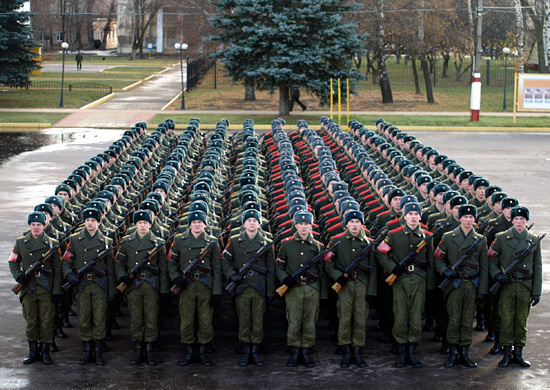

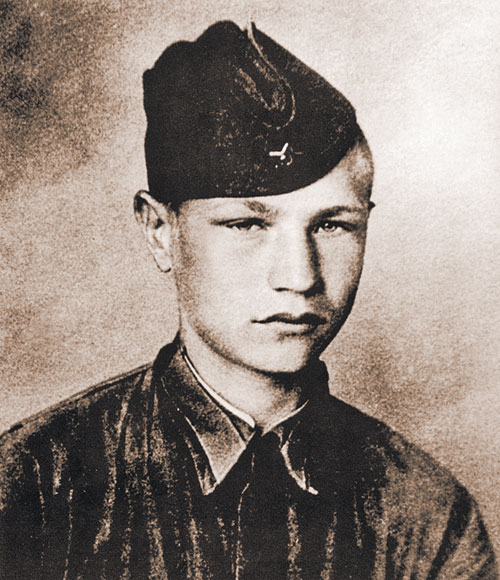
A photo of Marshal of the Soviet Union Dmitry Yazov when he was a cadet in the school.

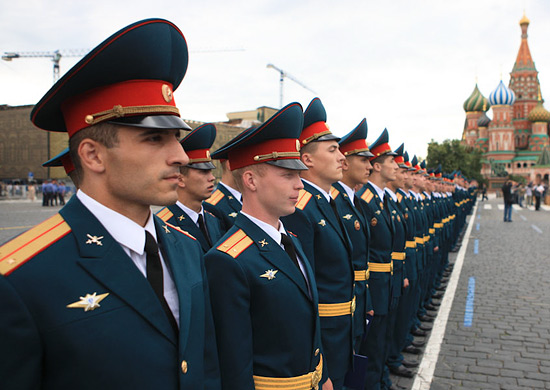

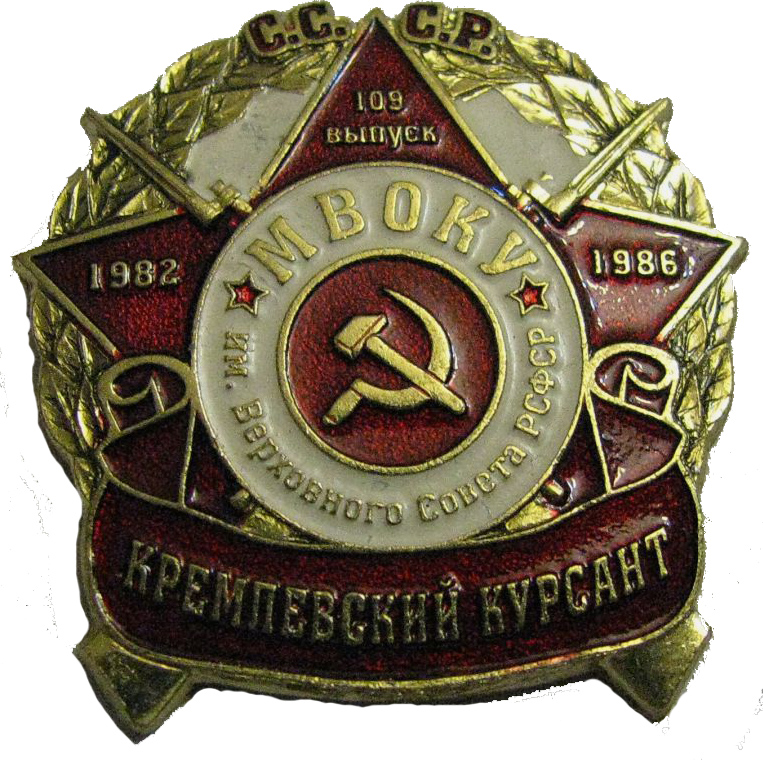
The breastplate of the MVOKU.

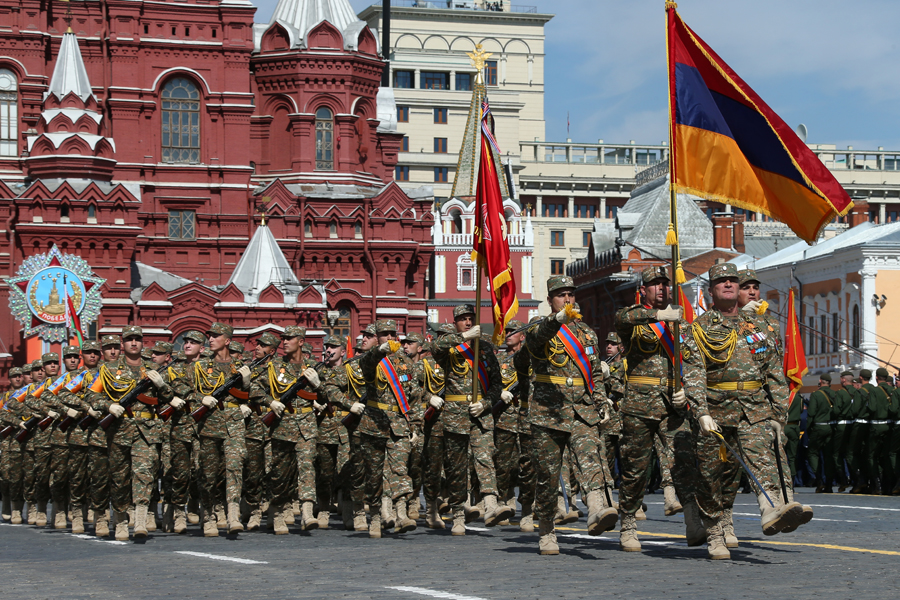
Colonel Ashot Hakobyan leading the contingent from the Armenian Armed Forces during the 2015 Moscow Victory Day Parade. Being a graduate at the school, he participated in Soviet-era parades on the square.

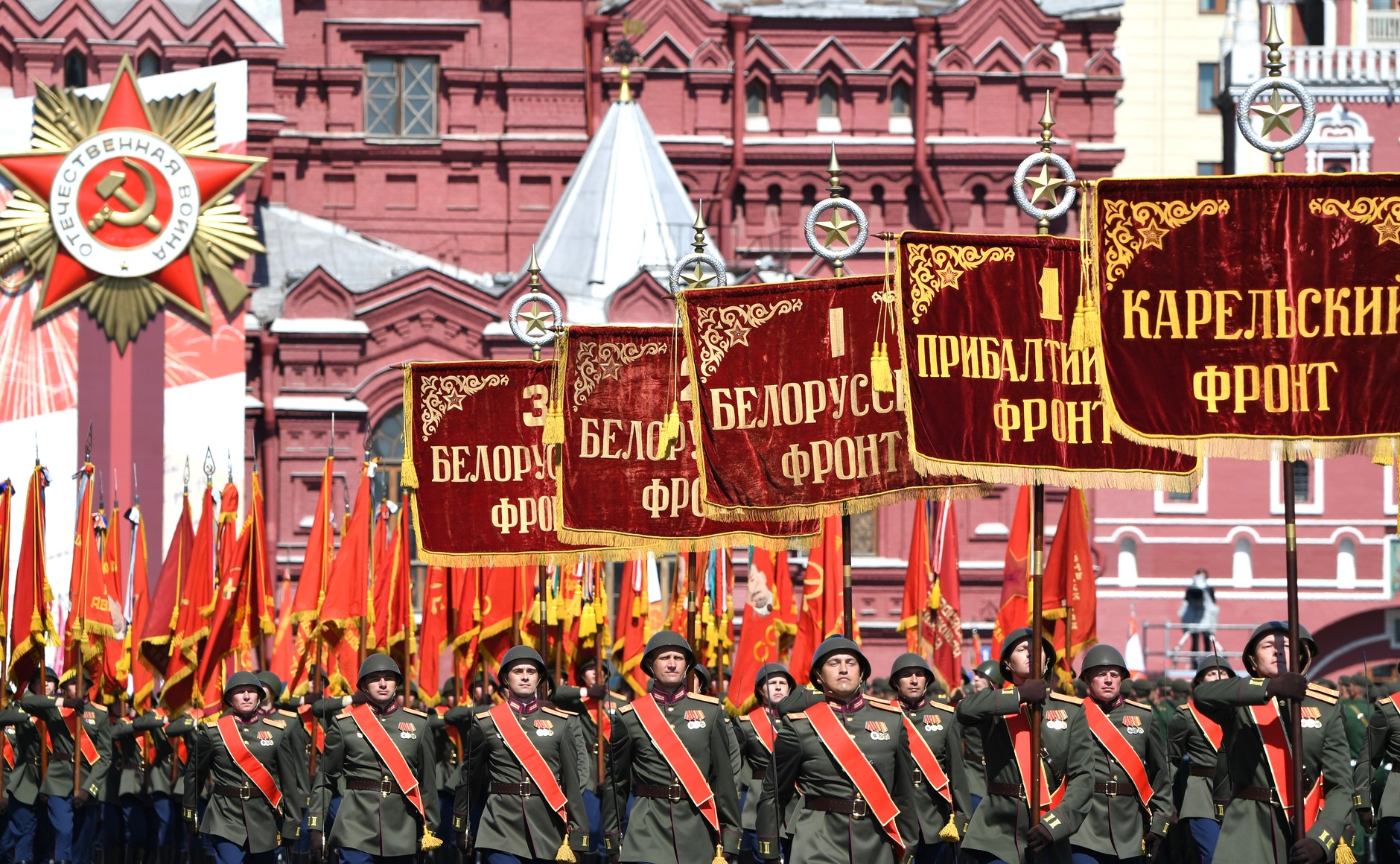
Historical color guards from the school.

== In popular culture ==
- A Story by Konstantin Vorobyov "Killed near Moscow" (1963), which tells about the participation of a company of Kremlin cadets in the defense of Moscow in the fall of 1941.
- Exam for Immortality (1983), Soviet feature film based on the stories of Vorobyov's "Killed near Moscow" and "Scream".
- Kremlin cadets (2009) is a Russian television series that describes the fictional life story of cadets of the Moscow Higher Military Command School.
- An episode in Nikita Mikhalkov's film Burnt by the Sun 2 (2010)

== See also ==
- Military academy
- Military academies in Russia
