= Ivan Efremov =

Ivan Efremov may refer to:

- Ivan Efremov (weightlifter) (born 1986), Uzbek Olympics weightlifter
- Ivan Yefremov (1907–1972), Soviet paleontologist, science fiction author and social thinker
- Ivan Efremov (wrestler) (born 1996), Russian freestyle wrestler
- Ivan Yefremov (general) (born 1946), Russian general
