= Alexey Maslov =

Russian general (1953–2022)

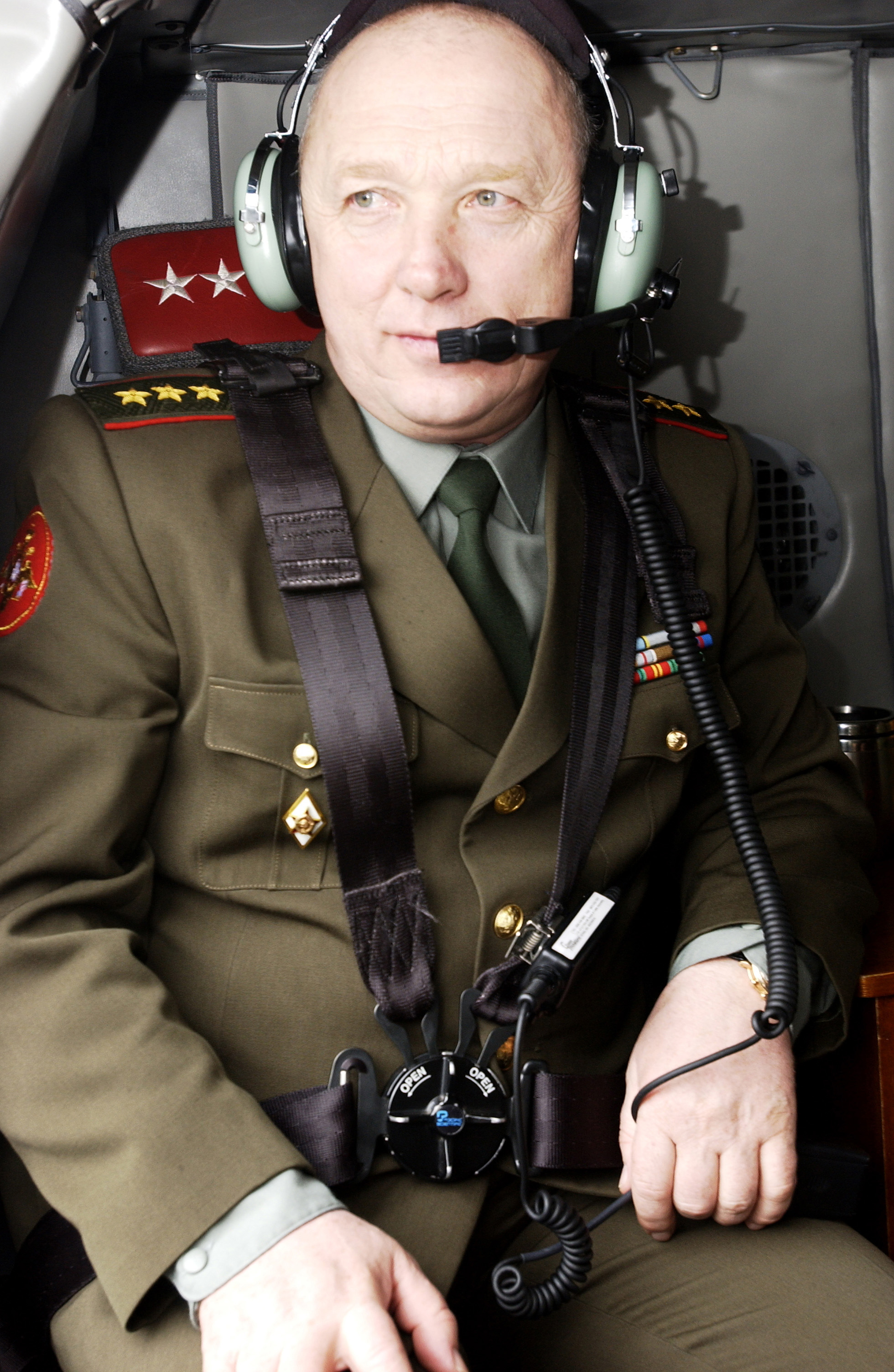
- Maslov in 2004
- Native name: Алексей Фёдорович Маслов
- Born: 23 September 1953; Panskoye, Kursk Oblast, Russian SFSR, Soviet Union
- Died: 25 December 2022 (aged 69) Burdenko Main Military Clinical Hospital, Moscow, Russia
- Buried: Federal Military Memorial Cemetery
- Allegiance: Soviet Union (to 1991); Russia
- Branch: Soviet Army; Russian Ground Forces
- Service years: 1970–2011
- Rank: General of the Army
- Commands: Commander-in-Chief of the Russian Ground Forces
- Education: Kharkov Higher Tank Command School; Malinovsky Armored Forces Academy; Russian General Staff Academy

General of the Army Alexey Fyodorovich Maslov (Note: Russian: Алексей Фёдорович Маслов) (23 September 1953 – 25 December 2022) was a Russian military officer who served as Commander-in-Chief of the Russian Ground Forces from 2004 to 2008 and as Senior Russian Military Representative to NATO from 2008 to 2011.

== Biography ==
Born on 23 September 1953 in Panskoye, Kursk region, Alexey Maslov was educated at the Kharkov Higher Tank Command School. His first service tours were in the Carpathian Military District, where he served as tank platoon, company, and battalion commander. In 1984, he earned a degree at the Tank Academy and was appointed regiment commander (1986) and, later, deputy division commander within the Central Group of Forces in Czechoslovakia. From 1990 to 1994, General Maslov served as deputy division commander, Volga-Ural Military District and, in 1994, assumed command of 15th Guards 'Mozyr' Tank Division, at Chebarkul within the same district.

In 1998, General Maslov graduated from the General Staff Academy and took up the post as deputy commander for training, within the then Transbaikal Military District.

In 1999, he became Chief of Combat Training in the Siberian Military District. In March 2000, he was appointed chief of staff and first deputy army commander of 36th Combined Arms Army within the Siberian Military District.

From June 2001 to 2003, General Maslov served as commander of 57th Army Corps in the Siberian Military District. On 22 March 2003 he was appointed chief of staff & First Deputy Commander, North Caucasus Military District. He later became First Deputy Commander and Chief of Staff of the Ground Forces.

By a Presidential Decree of 5 November 2004 Alexey Maslov assumed the duties of Ground Forces Commander-in-Chief, succeeding General Nikolai Kormiltsev. As Commander-in-Chief, he started to increase the number of contract soldiers in the Russian Ground Forces. He was promoted to the rank of General of the Army on 15 December 2006.

In August 2008, he stepped down from the position of the Commander-in-Chief of the Russian Ground Forces, then moved to the Russian Military Representative to NATO. He was replaced by General of the Army Vladimir Boldyrev, former Commander of the Volga-Urals Military District. He retired from active duty in October 2011.

Maslov died unexpectedly at the Burdenko Main Military Clinical Hospital, Moscow on 25 December 2022, at the age of 69. His death has been regarded as suspicious. He was buried at the Federal Military Memorial Cemetery.

== See also ==
- 2022 Russian businessmen mystery deaths

== Notes ==
Military offices
Preceded by Vladimir Bulgakov	Chief of Staff and First Deputy Commander of the North Caucasus Military District; 2003–2004	Succeeded by Aleksandr Postnikov
Preceded by Nikolai Kormiltsev	Commander-in-Chief of the Russian Ground Forces; 2004–2008	Succeeded by Vladimir Boldyrev
Preceded by Valentin Kuznetsov	Senior Russian Military Representative to NATO; 2008–2011	Succeeded by Aleksandr Burov
