= Aleksandr Postnikov =

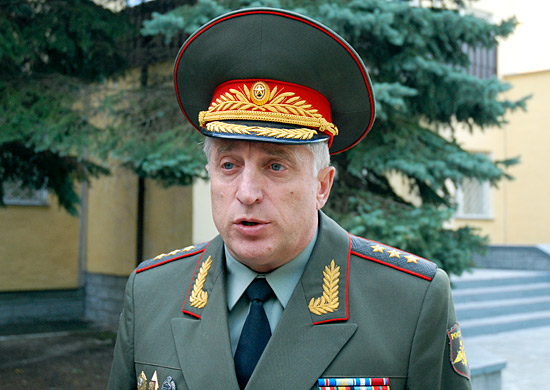
- Postnikov in 2011
- Native name: Александр Николаевич Постников-Стрельцов
- Born: Alexander Nikolayevich Postnikov-Streltsov; February 23, 1957 (age 69); Labinsk, Krasnodar Krai, Russian SFSR, Soviet Union
- Allegiance: USSR (to 1991); Russia
- Branch: Soviet Army; Russian Ground Forces
- Service years: 1978–2014
- Rank: Colonel General
- Commands: Commander-in-Chief of the Russian Ground Forces; Siberian Military District; 20th Combined Arms Army
- Education: Kiev Higher Combined Arms Command School; Frunze Military Academy; Russian General Staff Academy

Colonel General Aleksandr Nikolayevich Postnikov-Streltsov (Note: Russian: Александр Николаевич Постников-Стрельцов) (born 23 February 1957) is a retired Russian military officer. He was the Commander-in-Chief of the Russian Ground Forces from 2010 to 2012 and a Deputy Chief of the General Staff of the Russian Armed Forces from 2012 to 2014. Commissioned in 1978, he served in several military districts and with the Group of Soviet Forces in Germany. Postnikov-Streltsov graduated from the Frunze Military Academy and the Russian General Staff Academy. His senior commands included the 20th Combined Arms Army from 2000 to 2002 and the Siberian Military District from 2007 to 2010.

== Military career ==
Aleksandr Nikolayevich Streltsov was born on 23 February 1957 in Labinsk, Krasnodar Krai, Russian SFSR, Soviet Union. While studying at the Kiev Higher Combined Arms Command School, he married the daughter of the Soviet general Stanislav Postnikov, and changed his last name to Postnikov-Streltsov. He graduated and was commissioned in the Soviet Army in 1978.

After commissioning, he held commands at the platoon and company levels in the Kiev Military District and at the battalion level with the Group of Soviet Forces in Germany. Postnikov-Streltsov graduated from the Frunze Military Academy in 1988 and held commands in the Odessa and Far Eastern military districts. As of 1998, he was chief of staff of the Tamanskaya Division in the Moscow Military District. He later attended the General Staff Academy, graduating in 2000.

From his graduation at the General Staff Academy until August 2002, he was the chief of staff of the 22nd Combined Arms Army. Postnikov-Streltsov was then the commander of the 20th Combined Arms Army in the Moscow Military District until November 2004. He was made the chief of staff and first deputy commander of the North Caucasus Military District. In December 2006 he was transferred to the same post in the Siberian Military District, and on 19 April 2007 he succeeded Colonel General Nikolai Makarov as the district commander.

On 11 January 2010 Postnikov-Streltsov became the Commander-in-Chief of the Russian Ground Forces. On 26 April 2012 he became Deputy Chief of the General Staff of the Russian Armed Forces. He resigned from his post and retired in February 2014.

== Notes ==
Military offices
Preceded by Sergey Makarov	Commander of the 20th Combined Arms Army; 2000–2002	Succeeded by Andrey Ivanayev
Preceded by Nikolai Makarov	Commander of the Siberian Military District; 2007–2010	Succeeded by Vladimir Chirkin
Preceded by Vladimir Boldyrev	Commander-in-Chief of the Russian Ground Forces; 2010–2012	Succeeded by Vladimir Chirkin
Preceded by Valery Gerasimov	Deputy Chief of the General Staff of the Russian Armed Forces; 2012–2014; With: Oleg Salyukov	Vacant
