= Yuri Bukreyev =

Russian retired general (born 1941)

- Юрий Дмитриевич Букреев
- Born: May 19, 1941 (age 85); Vtoraya Alekseyevka, Kursk Oblast, Russian SFSR, Soviet Union
- Education: Tashkent Higher Tank Command School; Malinovsky Military Armored Forces Academy; Voroshilov General Staff Academy
- Military career
- Allegiance: Soviet Union (to 1991); Russia
- Branch: Soviet Army; Russian Ground Forces
- Service years: 1960–2001
- Rank: Colonel General
- Commands: Head of the Main Directorate of the Russian Ground Forces
- Awards: Order of Military Merit; Order of the Red Star

Colonel General Yuri Dmitriyevich Bukreyev (Note: Russian: Юрий Дмитриевич Букреев) (born 19 May 1941) is a Russian retired military officer who served as the Head of the Main Directorate of the Russian Ground Forces from 1998 to 2001. He began his career in the Soviet Army in 1960, before becoming a graduate of the Tashkent Higher Tank Command School, the Malinovsky Military Armored Forces Academy, and the Voroshilov General Staff Academy.

== Early life ==
Bukreyev was born in the village of Vtoraya Alekseyevka in Kursk Oblast, Russian SFSR. The German invasion of the Soviet Union began shortly after that and his family fled the occupation by moving to the Voronezh Oblast. In 1946, the family moved to Alma-Ata, Kazakh Soviet Socialist Republic where he graduated from high school.

== Military career ==
Bukreyev entered the Soviet Army in 1960 and began serving as a private in a training tank regiment of the Turkestan Military District. He graduated from the Tashkent Higher Tank Command School, and later from the Malinovsky Military Armored Forces Academy, in 1973. From 1973 he served in the Group of Soviet Forces in Germany as a deputy commander and then commander of a tank regiment, and as the chief of staff of a motor rifle division. From 1980, he was a commander of a division in the Kiev Military District (Konotop). Bukreyev graduated from the Voroshilov General Staff Academy in 1985 with a gold medal.

In 1985, he became the deputy commander of a field army in the Far Eastern Military District, and in 1987 became the commander of the 51st Combined Arms Army in Yuzhno-Sakhalinsk. This formation was responsible for securing Sakhalin, the Kuril Islands, the Kamchatka Peninsula, and the Chukotka Peninsula. From March 1989 he was the Chief of Staff and First Deputy Commander of the Turkestan Military District. From 1991 he was the Chief of the Main Staff and the First Deputy Commander-in-Chief of the Ground Forces. After the disbandment of the Main Command of the Ground Forces in January 1998, Bukreyev was appointed acting head of the newly formed Main Directorate of the Ground Forces of the Armed Forces of the Russian Federation. On 9 May 1998 he was appointed the Head of the Main Directorate of the Ground Forces and the Deputy Chief of the General Staff of the Armed Forces for the Ground Forces. He contributed to the restoration of the Main Command of the Ground Forces in 2001. Bukreyev retired from the military in July 2001. His decorations include the Order of Military Merit and the Order of the Red Star.

== Civilian career ==
Since leaving the military he has been involved in several organizations that assist veterans and served as an advisor to the Russian government on veterans' affairs. He is the chairman of the National Association of Reserve Officers of the Armed Forces ("Megapir").

== See also ==
- Биографическая справка. // «Красная Звезда». — 18 июня 1998.
- «Сила офицерского братства»/«Красная Звезда». — 28 декабря 2002.

Military offices
| Preceded by Viktor Novozhilov | Commander of the 51st Army; 1987–1989 | Succeeded by Yevgeny Vysotsky |
| Preceded by Eduard Vorobyov | First Deputy Commander of the Turkestan Military District; 1989–1991 | Succeeded by Position abolished |
| Preceded by Boris Gromov | Chief of the Main Staff and First Deputy Commander-in-Chief of the Russian Ground Forces; 1991–1994 | Succeeded by Eduard Vorobyov |
| Preceded by Vladimir Semyonov | Chief of the Main Directorate of the Russian Ground Forces; 1998–2001 | Succeeded by Nikolai Kormiltsev |
