= Sergey Istrakov =

Russian colonel general (born 1959)

- Сергей Истраков
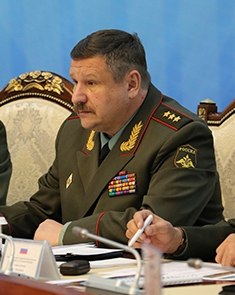
- Istrakov in 2017
- Born: 5 February 1959 (age 67); Chernyakhovsk, Kaliningrad Oblast, Russian SFSR, Soviet Union
- Alma mater: Baku Higher Combined Arms Command School; Frunze Military Academy; Russian General Staff Academy
- Military career
- Allegiance: Soviet Union (until 1991); Russia
- Branch: Soviet Airborne Forces; Russian Airborne Forces; Russian Ground Forces
- Service years: 1982–present
- Rank: Colonel general
- Conflicts: Incident at Pristina Airport; Russo-Georgian War; War in Donbass

Colonel General Sergey Yuryevich Istrakov (Russian: Сергей Юрьевич Истраков; born 5 February 1959) is a Russian military officer who has served as the Deputy Chief of the General Staff of the Russian Armed Forces since 2015. He was previously the Chief of the Main Staff and First Deputy Commander-in-Chief of the Russian Ground Forces from 2013 to 2015, and was the acting Commander-in-Chief from 2013 to 2014.

== Early life and education ==
Sergey Yuryevich Istrakov was born on 5 February 1959 in Chernyakhovsk, Kaliningrad Oblast, Russian SFSR. He graduated from the Baku Higher Combined Arms Command School in 1982 and was commissioned as an officer.

== Military career ==
Even though the Baku Higher Combined Arms Command School was an institution of the Soviet Army, he spent much of the next twenty years serving in units of the Soviet and Russian Airborne Forces. He held command at levels from a platoon to a battalion in the 39th Separate Air Assault Brigade, located in the Carpathian Military District. In 1989 Istrakov began attending the Frunze Military Academy, and after his graduation in 1992 he became a battalion deputy commander and commander, and then a brigade deputy commander and commander.

From 1999 to 2000, Istrakov served with the 1st Separate Airborne Brigade in Bosnia and Herzegovina, and is said to have participated in the deployment of Russian paratroopers into Kosovo in June 1999, leading to the incident at Pristina Airport. After his time in former Yugoslavia, he attended the Russian General Staff Academy from 2000 to 2002. Following graduation he commanded the 203rd Separate Motor Rifle Brigade until 2003, and then the 20th Motor Rifle Division until 2006. Istrakov was then appointed chief of staff and first deputy commander of the 58th Combined Arms Army in Vladikavkaz, North Caucasus Military District. There are some reports that in this role, he participated in the 2008 Russo-Georgian War, though in April 2008 he was appointed the commander of the 41st Combined Arms Army in the Siberian Military District.

On 11 June 2009, Istrakov was appointed deputy commander of the Siberian Military District, which in 2010 was succeeded by the Central Military District. He remained in that role until his appointment on 28 April 2013 as chief of staff and first deputy commander-in-chief of the Russian Ground Forces. On 2 December 2013, Lieutenant General Istrakov became the interim Commander-in-Chief of the Russian Ground Forces after his superior, Vladimir Chirkin, was removed due to a corruption case. Ukrainian military intelligence has claimed that during that time, he was responsible for preparing Russian forces to be involved in the war in Donbass. On 2 May 2014, he was succeeded as commander-in-chief by Oleg Salyukov. In early 2015 he became Deputy Chief of the General Staff of the Russian Armed Forces, and according to Ukrainian intelligence, Colonel General Istrakov coordinated Russian military actions in the Donbass. According to Georgian sources, Istrakov is responsible for integrating Abkhazian Armed Forces units with the Russian Armed Forces from 2017.

On 4 October 2024, Istrakov made an official visit to Pakistan and met with the Chairman Joint Chiefs of Staff Committee, General Sahir Shamshad Mirza, to discuss bilateral security cooperation between Russia and Pakistan.

== Awards and decorations ==
Russia

- Order of Courage
- Order of Honour
- Order of Military Merit

In 2017 the Donetsk People's Republic gifted Istrakov a watch for his "significant personal contribution to the formation and development of the Donetsk People's Republic."

== Personal life ==
He is married and has a son and a daughter.

Military offices
| Preceded by Aleksandr Galkin | Commander of the 41st Combined Arms Army; 2008–2009 | Succeeded by Vasily Tonkoshkurov |
| Preceded by ??? | Chief of the Main Staff and First Deputy Commander-in-Chief of the Russian Ground Forces; 2013–2015 | Succeeded by Aleksey Dyumin |
| Preceded by Vladimir Chirkin | Commander-in-Chief of the Russian Ground Forces; Acting; 2013–2014 | Succeeded by Oleg Salyukov |
| Vacant Title last held by Oleg Salyukov | Deputy Chief of the General Staff of the Russian Armed Forces; 2015–present | Incumbent |
