= Nikolai Kormiltsev =

Russian retired general (born 1946)

- Николай Викторович Кормильцев
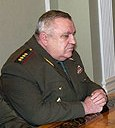
- Kormiltsev in 2004
- Born: 14 March 1946 (age 80); Omsk, Russian SFSR, Soviet Union
- Military career
- Allegiance: Soviet Union (to 1991); Russia
- Branch: Soviet Army; Russian Ground Forces
- Service years: 1969–2004
- Rank: General of the Army
- Commands: Commander-in-Chief of the Russian Ground Forces; Siberian Military District; Transbaikal Military District; 5th Army
- Conflicts: Soviet–Afghan War
- Awards: Order "For Merit to the Fatherland" 4th class; Order of Military Merit; Order of Honour; Order of the Red Star; Order "For Service to the Homeland in the Armed Forces of the USSR" 3rd class

General of the Army Nikolai Viktorovich Kormiltsev (Note: Russian: Никола́й Ви́кторович Корми́льцев) (born 14 March 1946) is a Russian retired military officer who served as Commander-in-Chief of the Russian Ground Forces from 2001 to 2004. He was commissioned in the Soviet Army in 1969 and served in the Soviet–Afghan War. His senior commands have included the 5th Army from 1993 to 1994, the Transbaikal Military District from 1996 to 1998, and the Siberian Military District from 1998 to 2001.

== Biography ==
Kormiltsev was born on 14 March 1946 in Omsk, joining the Soviet Army in 1965 and graduating from the Omsk Higher Combined Arms Command School four years later. In 1978, he graduated from the Frunze Military Academy and became a deputy division commander. Kormiltsev later became the division commander, leading it during the Soviet–Afghan War. After returning from Afghanistan, he took command of a district training center in Omsk, part of the Siberian Military District.

In 1990, Kormiltsev graduated from the Military Academy of the General Staff, and became commander of the 36th Army Corps of the Turkestan Military District, which became the shortlived 52nd Army between July 1992 and May 1993. He was appointed to command the 5th Army in 1993.

In November 1994, Kormiltsev became First Deputy Commander of the Transbaikal Military District, taking command of the district in September 1996. When in December 1998, by unifying the Siberian Military District and the Trans-Baikal Military District, a unified Siberian Military District was established with headquarters in Chita, Kormiltsev was appointed commander of the troops of this district. After the Main Command of the Ground Forces was abolished in 1997, he criticized the move and supported the recreation of the Main Command.

In April 2001, the Main Command was reformed, and then-Colonel General Kormiltsev became Commander-in-Chief of the Russian Ground Forces. He simultaneously became a deputy Minister of Defense. On 11 June 2003, he was promoted to Army General. In October 2004, Kormiltsev resigned from his position as a result of a disagreement with Minister of Defense Sergei Ivanov and Chief of the General Staff Yuri Baluyevsky over the next military reform.

== Notes ==
Military offices
Preceded by Vladimir Potapov	Commander of the 5th Army; 1993–1994	Succeeded by Aleksandr Morozov
Preceded by Valery Tretyakov	Commander of the Transbaikal Military District; 1996–1998	District abolished
Preceded by Grigory Kasperovich	Commander of the Siberian Military District; 1998–2001	Succeeded by Vladimir Boldyrev
Preceded by Yuri Bukreyev as Chief of the Main Directorate of the Ground Forces	Commander-in-Chief of the Russian Ground Forces; 2001–2004	Succeeded by Alexey Maslov
