= Alexei Kim =

Russian colonel general (born 1958)

Alexei Rostislavovich Kim
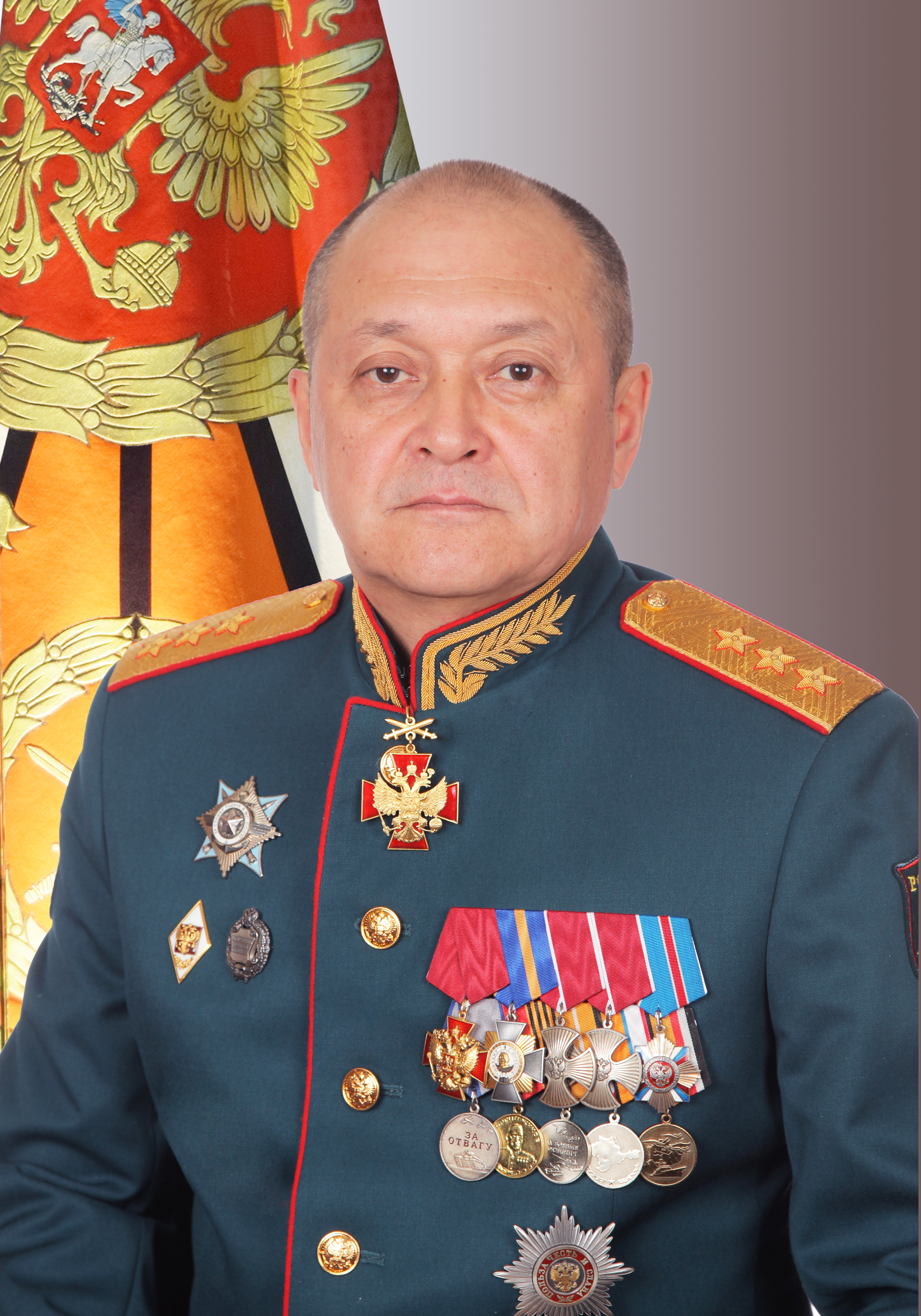
- Native name: Алексей Ростиславович Ким
- Born: 21 September 1958 (age 67); Moscow, Soviet Union
- Allegiance: Soviet Union; Russia
- Branch: Soviet Ground Forces; Russian Ground Forces
- Service years: 1979–present
- Rank: Colonel general
- Conflicts: Soviet–Afghan War; Tajikistani Civil War; Second Chechen War; Syrian Civil War; Russo-Ukrainian War; Russian invasion of Ukraine

Alexei Rostislavovich Kim (Russian: Алексей Ростиславович Ким; born 21 September 1958) is a Russian Ground Forces colonel general. Since January 2023 he has been Deputy Chief of the General Staff of the Armed Forces of the Russian Federation. Before that he was the Chief of the Main Staff and First Deputy Commander-in-Chief of the Russian Ground Forces from 2022 to 2023.

Kim was appointed one of the three deputy commanders of Russian troops in Ukraine in January 2023.

== Biography ==
Kim was born on 21 September 1958. He is of Korean ethnicity. Kim was accepted to the Moscow Higher Military Command School, graduating in 1979. His first posting was commander of a reconnaissance platoon of a separate motor rifle regiment fighting near Shindand during the Soviet–Afghan War. Subsequently, Kim graduated from the Frunze Military Academy with honors, and served in East Germany for a year before the Russian withdrawal. Kim, by then a lieutenant colonel, was then sent to Tajikistan and served as deputy chief of the operational department of the staff of a combined arms army during the Tajikistani Civil War. He was awarded the Order of Courage for his performance in Tajikistan.

From the start of the Second Chechen War, Kim served as chief of staff and first deputy commander of the western operational axis of the Combined Group of Federal Forces in the North Caucasus, the Russian troops in the war. In August 1999 he became chief of the operational department and deputy chief of staff of the 58th Combined Arms Army, taking part in the Battle of Grozny. Kim was admitted to the Military Academy of the General Staff for senior officer training and graduated with honors in 2003.

From 2008 to December 2009, he served as deputy chief of the Combined Arms Academy for training and research work. From December 2009, he was chief of the academy, and in January 2010 reverted to his previous position. In August 2014 he rose to deputy chief of the Military Academy of the General Staff. Kim was sent to Syria as chief of the Russian Reconciliation Center for Syria, a Russian-sponsored organization with ostensible humanitarian missions, from February to December 2017. In April 2019, Kim returned to an operational post as deputy Commander-in-Chief of the Russian Ground Forces for peacekeeping missions, and was promoted to colonel general on 10 December 2020.

After the Russian invasion of Ukraine resulted in reshuffling of senior officers, Kim was appointed chief of the General Staff and first deputy commander-in-chief of the Russian Ground Forces in September 2022. By January 2023 he was deputy chief of the General Staff. Kim was appointed one of three deputy commanders of the Joint Grouping of Forces for the invasion on 11 January 2023. The other two deputy commanders were Sergey Surovikin and Oleg Salyukov, with Chief of the General Staff Valery Gerasimov appointed commander-in-chief.

== Decorations ==
- Order "For Merit to the Fatherland" 2nd class with swords
- Order "For Merit to the Fatherland" 3rd class with swords
- Order "For Merit to the Fatherland" 4th class
- Order of Alexander Nevsky
- Order of Kutuzov
- Order of Courage (3)
- Order of Military Merit
- Order "For Service to the Homeland in the Armed Forces of the USSR" 3rd class
