= Valery Yevnevich =

Hero of the Russian Federation Colonel General Valery Yevnevich
- Валерий Евневич
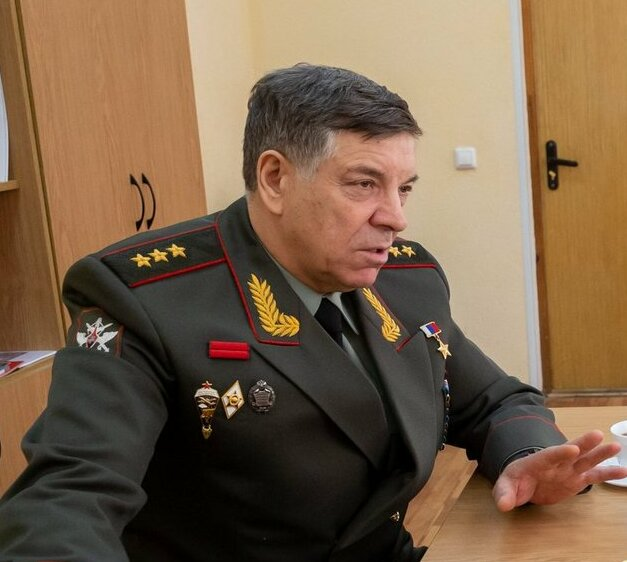
- Yevnevich in 2020
- Born: 2 September 1951 (age 75); Batumi, Adjarian ASSR
- Alma mater: Ryazan Guards Higher Airborne Command School; Frunze Military Academy; General Staff Military Academy
- Military career
- Allegiance: Soviet Union (to 1991); Russia
- Branch: Soviet Army; Russian Ground Forces
- Service years: 1968–2014
- Rank: Colonel general
- Commands: 56th Guards Air Assault Regiment; 2nd Guards Motor Rifle Division; Operational Group of Russian Forces
- Conflicts: Soviet–Afghan War; 1993 Russian constitutional crisis
- Awards: Hero of the Russian Federation; Order "For Merit to the Fatherland"; Order of Military Merit; Order of the Red Banner; Order of the Red Star; Medal "For Battle Merit"; Jubilee Medal "In Commemoration of the 100th Anniversary of the Birth of Vladimir Ilyich Lenin"; Medal of Zhukov; Jubilee Medal "300 Years of the Russian Navy"; Medal "In Commemoration of the 850th Anniversary of Moscow"; Medal "For Distinction in Military Service"; Jubilee Medal "60 Years of the Armed Forces of the USSR"; Jubilee Medal "70 Years of the Armed Forces of the USSR"
- Other work: Chairman of Lukoil-Rezerfneftprodukt; Chairman of Union of Veterans of the 40th Army

Valery Gennadyevich Yevnevich (Russian: Валерий Геннадьевич Евневич; born 2 September 1951) is a retired Russian Ground Forces colonel general who served as Deputy Commander-in-Chief of the Ground Forces from 2006 to 2009.

== Biography ==
Yevnevich was born on 2 September 1951, in Batumi, Adjarian ASSR. He graduated from high school in Stary Krym (Republic of Crimea) in 1968. In the Armed Forces since 1968. In 1972, he graduated from the Ryazan Guards Higher Airborne Command School with honours, in 1983 the Frunze Military Academy with honours and in 1992 the General Staff Military Academy.

He served in the Baltic (commanded the 1st training parachute reconnaissance company in the 226th UPDP), Odessa, Turkestan and Moscow military districts. From June 1983 he served as Chief of Staff and Deputy Commander of the 217th Guards Parachute Regiment of the 98th Guards Airborne Division.

From January 1986 he served as Chief of Staff and Deputy Commander and from August 1987 he served as Commander of the 56th Guards Air Assault Regiment as part of the limited contingent of Soviet troops in Afghanistan. He commanded the same brigade until August 1990 and after the withdrawal of troops from Afghanistan, the place of deployment is the city of Ýolöten in the Turkmen SSR (Military unit 33079). In 1990-1992 he studied at the General Staff Military Academy.

From June 1992 to 1995 he served as Commander of the Taman Division of the Moscow Military District. He commanded the Taman Division during the events of October 3–4, 1993 in Moscow. Many media outlets claim that he personally supervised the actions of tank units that conducted targeted fire on the White House building. However, Yevnevich himself denied that the Taman Division had tanks during the shelling of the White House and recalled the difficult emotional and psychological pressure at that moment: “For me, for example, those days in Moscow are worth two and a half years of Afghanistan and what followed for my brigade after it: Central Asia, Armenia. There was enough blood there too”. On 7 October 1993, Boris Yeltsin awarded him the title Hero of the Russian Federation for his participation in the storming of the White House.

Since May 1995 he served as First Deputy Commander of the 14th Guards Army in Transnistria, which in June 1995 was transformed into the Operational Group of Russian Forces in the Transnistrian Region of the Republic of Moldova. He commanded this group from June 1995 to January 2002, during which time the group of Russian troops in Transnistria was reduced to 3 battalions (2 motorized rifle battalions, 1 security and supply battalion), 95% of the military equipment was destroyed or taken to the Russian Federation.

From January 2002 to 2006 he served as Deputy Commander-in-Chief of the Russian Ground Forces for peacekeeping forces.

From September 2006 he served as Deputy Commander-in-Chief of the Ground Forces.

From July 2009 he served as Chief of the Main Directorate of Combat Training and Service of Troops of the Ministry of Defense.

From March 2011 he served as Assistant to the Minister of Defense of the Russian Federation. On 11 June 2011 he was promoted to Colonel General rank.

From 2 December 2013, he served as Chief Military Representative of the Permanent Military Representation of Russia to NATO. On 3 April 2014, he was recalled to Moscow "for consultations". He did not receive a new appointment and in June 2014 he was dismissed from his post and transferred to the reserve.

Since August 2014, he has been an advisor to the general director of LUKOIL-Rezervnefteprodukt LLC. He is the chairman of the Interregional public organization of veterans of military service and combat operations "Union of Veterans of the 40th Army".
