= Commander-in-Chief of the Russian Ground Forces =

Chief commanding authority of the Russian Ground Forces

- Главнокомандующий Сухопутными войсками России
- Flag of the Commander-in-Chief of the Russian Ground Forces

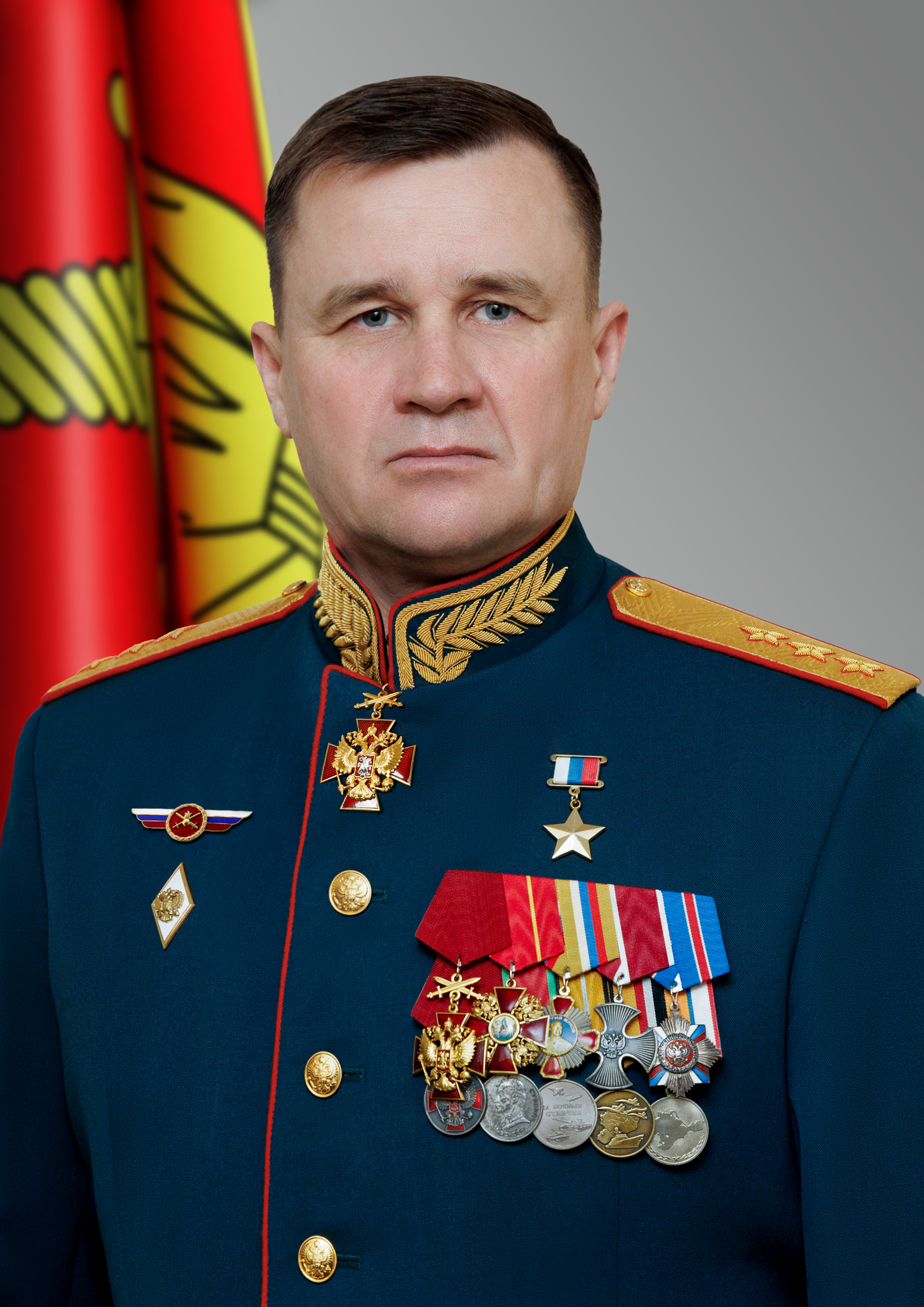
- Incumbent; Colonel General Andrey Mordvichev since 15 May 2025
- Russian Ground Forces
- Member of: General Staff of the Armed Forces
- Reports to: Chief of the General Staff
- Appointer: President of Russia
- Formation: 9 August 1812 (historical); 10 June 1992 (current form)
- Deputy: Chief of the Main Staff and First Deputy Commander-in-Chief
- Website: Official website

The Commander-in-Chief of the Russian Ground Forces (Russian: Главнокомандующий Сухопутными войсками России) is the chief commanding authority of the Russian Ground Forces. He is appointed by the President of Russia. The position dates to the period of the Russian Empire. The current Commander-in-Chief of the Russian Ground Forces is Colonel General Andrey Mordvichev, in office since 15 May 2025.

From 1998 to 2001 the position was briefly called the Chief of the Main Directorate of the Ground Forces.

== List of Commanders ==
† denotes people who died in office.

=== Red Army (1918–1946) ===
Commander-in-Chief

No.	Portrait	Commander-in-Chief	Took office	Left office	Time in office
1	Jukums Vācietis	Komandarm 2nd rank Jukums Vācietis (1873–1938)	6 September 1918	8 July 1919	305 days
2	Sergei Kamenev	Komandarm 1st rank Sergei Kamenev (1881–1936)	8 July 1919	28 April 1924	4 years, 295 days

Chief of Staff

No.	Portrait	Chief of the Staff	Took office	Left office	Time in office
1	Mikhail Frunze	Major General; Mikhail Frunze (1885–1925)	April 1924	January 1925	9 months
2	Sergei Kamenev	Komandarm 1st rank Sergei Kamenev (1881–1936)	January 1925	November 1925	10 months
3	Mikhail Tukhachevsky	Marshal of the Soviet Union; Mikhail Tukhachevsky (1893–1937)	November 1925	May 1928	2 years, 6 months
4	Boris Shaposhnikov	Komandarm 1st rank Boris Shaposhnikov (1882–1945)	May 1928	April 1931	2 years, 11 months
5	Vladimir Triandafillov	General; Vladimir Triandafillov (1894–1931) (Note: Died in a plane crash.)	May 1931	12 July 1931 †	2 months
6	Alexander Ilyich Yegorov	Marshal of the Soviet Union; Alexander Ilyich Yegorov (1883–1939)	July 1931	September 1935	4 years, 2 months

Chief of the General Staff

No.	Portrait	Chief of the General Staff	Took office	Left office	Time in office
1	Alexander Ilyich Yegorov	Marshal of the Soviet Union; Alexander Ilyich Yegorov (1883–1939)	September 1935	10 May 1937	1 year, 8 months
2	Boris Shaposhnikov	Marshal of the Soviet Union; Boris Shaposhnikov (1882–1945)	10 May 1937	August 1940	3 years, 2 months
3	Kirill Meretskov	Army General; Kirill Meretskov (1897–1968)	August 1940	January 1941	5 months
4	Georgy Zhukov	Army General; Georgy Zhukov (1896–1974)	February 1941	29 July 1941	5 months
(2)	Boris Shaposhnikov	Marshal of the Soviet Union; Boris Shaposhnikov (1882–1945)	29 July 1941	11 May 1942	286 days
5	Aleksandr Vasilevsky	Marshal of the Soviet Union; Aleksandr Vasilevsky (1895–1977)	26 June 1942	February 1945	2 years, 7 months
6	Aleksei Antonov	Army General; Aleksei Antonov (1896–1962)	February 1945	22 March 1946	1 year, 1 month

=== Soviet Ground Forces (1946–1992) ===
Commander-in-Chief

No.	Portrait	Commander-in-Chief	Took office	Left office	Time in office
1	Georgy Zhukov	Marshal of the Soviet Union; Georgy Zhukov (1896–1974)	March 1946	9 June 1946	5 months
2	Ivan Konev	Marshal of the Soviet Union; Ivan Konev (1897–1973)	1946	1950	3–4 years
Position of commander of ground forces did not exist from 1950–55
2	Ivan Konev	Marshal of the Soviet Union; Ivan Konev (1897–1973)	1955	1956	0–1 years
3	Rodion Malinovsky	Marshal of the Soviet Union; Rodion Malinovsky (1898–1967)	March 1956	26 October 1957	1 year
4	Andrei Grechko	Marshal of the Soviet Union; Andrei Grechko (1903–1976)	1957	1960	2–3 years
5	Vasily Chuikov	Marshal of the Soviet Union; Vasily Chuikov (1900–1982)	1960	1964	3–4 years
Position of commander of ground forces did not exist from 1964–67
6	Ivan Pavlovsky	Army General; Ivan Pavlovsky (1909–1999)	November 1967	1979	11–12 years
7	Vasiliy Petrov	Marshal of the Soviet Union; Vasiliy Petrov (1917–2014)	1980	January 1985	4–5 years
8	Yevgeni Ivanovski	Army General; Yevgeni Ivanovski (1918–1991)	5 February 1985	January 1989	3 years
9	Valentin Varennikov	Army General; Valentin Varennikov (1923–2009)	5 January 1989	22 August 1991	2 years
–	Mikhail Kolesnikov	Colonel General; Mikhail Kolesnikov (1939–2007); Acting	22 August 1991	31 August 1991	0 years
10	Vladimir Semyonov	Colonel General; Vladimir Semyonov (born 1940)	31 August 1991	August 1992	0 years

=== Russian Ground Forces (1992–present) ===
Commander-in-Chief

No.	Portrait	Commander-in-Chief	Took office	Left office	Time in office
1	Vladimir Semyonov	Army General; Vladimir Semyonov (born 1940)	August 1992	April 1997	4 years, 8 months

Chief of the Main Directorate

No.	Portrait	Chief of the Main Directorate	Took office	Left office	Time in office
–	Yuri Bukreyev	Colonel General; Yuri Bukreyev (born 1941); Acting	January 1998	9 May 1998	4 months
1	Yuri Bukreyev	Colonel general Yuri Bukreyev (born 1941)	9 May 1998	March 2001	2 years, 9 months

Commander-in-Chief

No.	Portrait	Commander-in-Chief	Took office	Left office	Time in office
1	Nikolai Kormiltsev	Army General; Nikolai Kormiltsev (born 1946)	28 March 2001	October 2004	3 years, 6 months
2	Aleksei Maslov	Army General; Aleksei Maslov (1953–2022)	5 November 2004	31 July 2008	3 years, 8 months
3	Vladimir Boldyrev	Army General; Vladimir Boldyrev (born 1953)	31 July 2008	January 2010	1 year, 5 months
4	Aleksandr Postnikov-Streltsov	Colonel General; Aleksandr Postnikov-Streltsov (born 1953)	11 January 2010	26 April 2012	2 years, 3 months
5	Vladimir Chirkin	Colonel General; Vladimir Chirkin (born 1955)	26 April 2012	2 December 2013	1 year, 7 months
–	Sergey Istrakov	Colonel General; Sergey Istrakov (born 1959); Acting	December 2013	March 2014	2 months
6	Oleg Salyukov	Army General; Oleg Salyukov (born 1955)	2 March 2014	15 May 2025	11 years, 2 months
7	Andrey Mordvichev	Colonel General; Andrey Mordvichev (born 1976)	15 May 2025		1 year, 3 months

== Deputies and chiefs of staff ==
=== First deputy commanders ===
Chief of the Main Staff and First Deputy Commander-in-Chief

- Aleksandr Grinkevich (1981–1990)
- Mikhail Kolesnikov (1990–1991)
- Boris Gromov (1991–1992)
- Yuri Bukreyev (1992–1994)
- Eduard Vorobyov (1994–1995)
- Anatoly Golovnyov (1995–1998)

Deputy Chief of the Main Directorate

- Nikolai Rogozhkin (1998)
- Gennady Kotenko (1998–2001)

Chief of the Main Staff and First Deputy Commander-in-Chief

- Aleksandr Morozov (2001–2008)
- Nikolai Bogdanovsky (2008–2009)
- Sergey Skokov (2009–2011)
- unknown
- Sergey Istrakov (2013–2015)
- Aleksey Dyumin (2015)
- Vladimir Popov (2016–2018)
- Vasily Tonkoshkurov (2018–2022)
- Alexei Kim (2022–2023)
- Aleksandr Lapin (2023–2024)
- Rustam Muradov (2024–present)

=== Deputy commanders ===
Deputy Commander of the Ground Forces

- unknown
- Vladimir Moltenskoy (2002–2003)
- Vladimir Bulgakov (2003–2006)
- Valery Yevnevich (2006–2009)
- Aleksandr Studenikin (2009–2010)
- unknown
- Alexander Lentsov (2013–2020)
- Aleksandr Matovnikov (2020–present)
