= Oleg Salyukov =

Russian retired army general (born 1955)

- Олег Леонидович Салюков
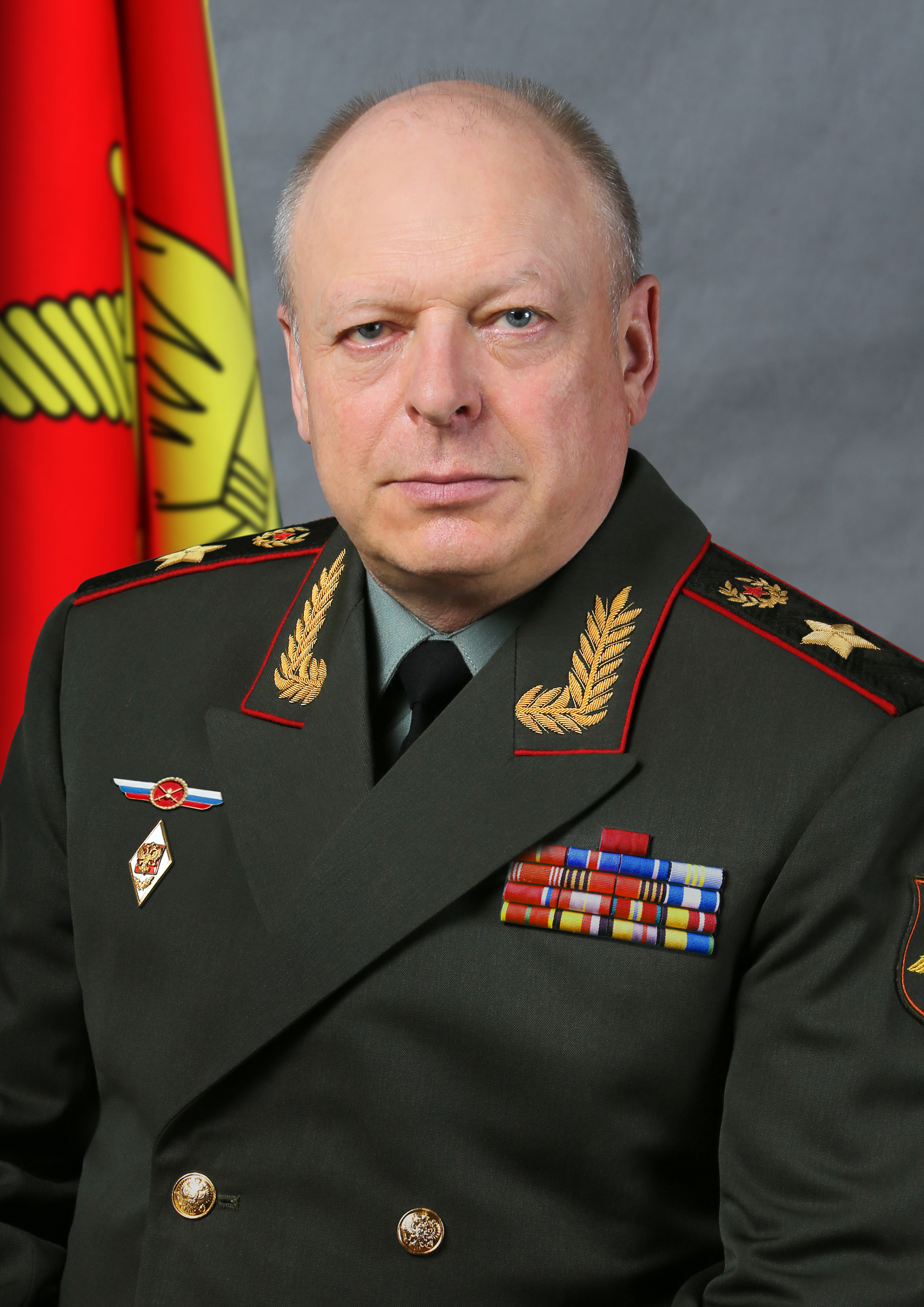
- Official portrait, 2015
- Born: May 21, 1955 (age 71); Saratov, Russian SFSR, Soviet Union
- Alma mater: Ulyanovsk Higher Tank Command School; Malinovsky Military Armored Forces Academy; Russian General Staff Academy
- Military career
- Allegiance: Soviet Union (to 1991); Russia
- Branch: Soviet Army; Russian Ground Forces
- Service years: 1977–2025
- Rank: General of the Army
- Commands: Commander-in-Chief of the Russian Ground Forces; Far Eastern Military District; 35th Army
- Conflicts: Russo-Ukrainian war

General of the Army Oleg Leonidovich Salyukov (Note: Russian: Олег Леонидович Салюков) (born 21 May 1955) is a Russian retired military officer who has been a deputy secretary of the Security Council of Russia since 2025. Before that he was the Commander-in-Chief of the Russian Ground Forces from 2014 to 2025. In addition, he was deputy commander of the joint military operation during the Russian invasion of Ukraine from 2023 to 2025.

== Early life and career ==
Salyukov, born on May 21, 1955, in Saratov, hails from a military background. His father, Leonid Ivanovich Salyukov (1920–2006), served as a tank driver and attained the rank of major general during the Great Patriotic War. Oleg spent his formative years in Penza, graduating from Secondary School No. 6 in 1972.

In 1977, Salyukov graduated with distinction from the Ulyanovsk Guards Higher Tank Command School. He furthered his education at the Malinovsky Military Armored Forces Academy, graduating with honors in 1985. Later, in 1996, he completed his studies at the Military Academy of the General Staff of the Armed Forces.

Salyukov's military career spans various roles and regions. He served in different capacities in the Kiev Military District from 1977 to 1982 and later held positions such as deputy commander of a training tank regiment and commander of a tank regiment in the Moscow Military District. Notably, he served as commander of the 121st Motorized Rifle Division and the 81st Guards Motorized Rifle Division. His leadership extended to the Far Eastern Military District, where he served as chief of staff and commander of the 35th Combined Arms Army.

Salyukov received promotions ahead of schedule, attaining the ranks of major and colonel. On June 12, 2006, he was awarded the military rank of Colonel General, and commanded the Far Eastern Military District from 2008 to 2010.

Subsequently, on December 10, 2010, he was appointed Deputy Chief of the General Staff of the Armed Forces of the Russian Federation. He served in this capacity until 2014.

== Commander-in-chief ==
Salyukov assumed the role of Commander-in-Chief of the Ground Forces of the Russian Federation on May 2, 2014, following a decree by President Vladimir Putin. Salukov has also overseen military parades on Red Square in Moscow on Victory Day from 2014 to 2025. Salyukov was honored with the military rank of Army General on February 22, 2019, becoming the 65th military leader in modern Russia to receive this distinction.

On 1 October 2014, he announced that Ground Forces Day, commemorating the founding of the Russian army by Ivan IV in 1550, would be celebrated from then with a wreath-laying ceremony at the memorial of Georgy Zhukov and a meeting of veterans, including the previous commanders-in-chief.

He was sanctioned by the UK government in 2022 in relation to the Russo-Ukrainian War. In February 2022 Salyukov was added to the European Union sanctions list for being "responsible for actively supporting and implementing actions and policies that undermine and threaten the territorial integrity, sovereignty and independence of Ukraine as well as the stability or security in Ukraine".

In January 2023 Salyukov was designated one of the three deputy commanders of the joint military operation in the Russian invasion of Ukraine, along with Alexei Kim and Sergey Surovikin. The Chief of the General Staff, Valery Gerasimov, was made the commander.

On May 15, 2025, Vladimir Putin dismissed Salyukov as Commander-in-Chief of the Land Forces, and announced Andrey Mordvichev as his successor. This took place several days before Salyukov's 70th birthday, at which point he is required by law to retire from active service. Salyukov was then appointed as Deputy Secretary of the Russian Security Council. The Council has several deputy secretaries.

== Assignments ==
Position Held	Period
Platoon Officer; Company Officer; Chief of the staff – Battalion Commander in the Kiev Military District	1977–1982
Deputy Commander of a Training Tank Regiment; Commander of a Training Tank Regiment; Deputy Commander of a Guards tank division in the Moscow Military District	1985–1994
Commander, 81st Guards Motor Rifle Division; Chief of the Staff and Army Commander (35th Army); Deputy Commander-in-Chief of the Far East Military District	1994–1997
Chief of the Staff-First Deputy Commander-in-Chief of the Far-East Military District	2005–2008
Commander-in-Chief of the Far-East Military District	2008–2010
Deputy Chief of the General Staff of the Armed Forces of the Russian Federation	2010–2014
Commander-in-Chief of the Russian Ground Forces	2014–2025
Deputy Commander of the Joint Group of Forces in Ukraine	2023–2025
Deputy Secretary of the Russian Security Council	2025–present

== Personal life ==
He is married and has a son.

== Notes ==
Military offices
Preceded by Aleksandr Kutikov	Commander of the 35th Army; 2002–2003	Succeeded by Nikolai Bogdanovsky
Preceded by Valery Gerasimov	Chief of Staff and First Deputy Commander of the Far Eastern Military District; 2005–2008	Succeeded by Anatoly Sidorov
Preceded by Vladimir Bulgakov	Commander of the Far Eastern Military District; 2008–2010	District abolished
New title	Deputy Chief of the General Staff of the Russian Armed Forces; 2010–2014; With: Valery Gerasimov and Aleksandr Postnikov	Vacant Title next held by Sergey Istrakov
Preceded by Sergey Istrakov; Acting	Commander-in-Chief of the Russian Ground Forces; 2014–2025	Succeeded by Andrey Mordvichev
