= 6th Guards Motor Rifle Division =

Motor rifle division of the Soviet military

6th Guards Motor Rifle Division (1985–1991) 166th Guards Motor Rifle Brigade (1992–1997)
- Active: 1985–1997
- Country: Soviet Union (1985–1991); Russia (1992–1997)
- Branch: Soviet Army (1985–1991); Russian Ground Forces (1992–1997)
- Type: Mechanized infantry (1985-1997)
- Garrison/HQ: Borne Sulinowo (1985–1992); Tver (1992–1997)
- Engagements: First Chechen War
- Decorations: Order of the Red Banner (2); Guards
- Battle honours: Vitebsk; Novgorod

Commanders
- Notable commanders: Vladimir Bulgakov

The 6th Guards Motor Rifle Vitebsk-Novgorod Twice Red Banner Division (Russian: 6-я гвардейская мотострелковая дивизия; Military Unit Number 68434) was a Soviet motor rifle division, which after the end of World War II was stationed on the Polish territory as part of Northern Group of Forces. It was the second formation of the 6th Guards Motor Rifle Division, and drew its history from the 90th Guards Rifle Division.

== History ==
In an exchange of numbers, the 6th Guards Lvov Motor Rifle Division (First Formation) in Germany in 1985 became the 90th Guards Tank Division, while the 90th Guards Tank Division became the 6th Guards Motor Rifle Division. The division in Poland disbanded a tank regiment and formed a motor rifle regiment, while the division in Germany formed a tank regiment.

Division headquarters was located in the town of Borne Sulinowo.

In November 1985, the 65th Separate Air Assault Battalion was formed from the division's 126th Separate Guards Reconnaissance Battalion in Białogard. Between May and November 1986, the battalion was expanded to form the 83rd Separate Air Assault Brigade under the command of Colonel V.M. Sinitsyn.

The Division withdrew from Poland in 1992 and was moved to Tver in the Moscow Military District where it became the 166th Guards Motor Rifle Brigade. Between January and July 1996 it fought in the First Chechen War. In 1997 the brigade was disbanded and converted into the 70th Guards Base for Storage of Weapons & Equipment. The 70th VkhVT was finally disbanded in 1998.

The lineage of the division is perpetuated by the 90th Guards Tank Division, reformed in 2016.

== Composition ==
=== 1985 ===
The division was composed of the following units.

- 16th Motor Rifle Regiment
- 82nd Guards Motor Rifle Regiment – Sypniewo
- 252nd Guards Motor Rifle Regiment
- 80th Tank Regiment
- 193rd Guards Self-Propelled Artillery Regiment
- 1082nd Anti-Aircraft Missile Regiment
- 90th Tank Battalion
- 54th Guards Communications Battalion
- 465th Anti-Tank Artillery Battalion
- 101st Guards Engineer-Sapper Battalion
- 126th Reconnaissance Battalion
- 71st Equipment Maintenance and Recovery Battalion
- 1083rd Material Supply Battalion
- 97th Medical Battalion
- 669th Missile Battalion

== Commanders ==
- Major General Vladimir Vasilyevich Bulgakov (1990–1992)
