= Yuri Yakubov =

General of the Army Yury Yakubov
- Юрий Николаевич Якубов
- Born: Yury Nikolayevich Yakubov; 29 August 1946 (age 80); Velikiye Luki, Russian SFSR, Soviet Union
- Military career
- Allegiance: Soviet Union; Russia
- Branch: Soviet Army; Russian Ground Forces
- Service years: 1969–2006
- Rank: Army General
- Commands: Far Eastern Military District (1999–2006)

Yury Nikolayevich Yakubov (Russian: Юрий Николаевич Якубов; born 29 August 1946), is a retired officer of the Soviet and Russian Armed Forces who commanded the Far Eastern Military District from 1999 to 2006. His final rank was Army General.

== Biography ==
Yakubov was born on 29 August 1946 in Velikiye Luki, to a military family. His father, Yury, and his mother served in the Great Patriotic War. After graduating from high school in Velikiye Luki, he chose his father's profession, by joining the Soviet Army in 1963.

Yakubov graduated from the Kharkov Guards Higher Tank Command School in 1967. Until 1968, he commanded a tank platoon in the Kiev Military District, then until 1973, commanded a platoon and a tank company in the 323rd Heavy Tank Regiment of the 10th Guards Tank Division of the 3rd Combined Arms Army of the Group of Soviet Forces in Germany. In 1973, he attended the Military Academy of Armored Forces named after Marshal of the Soviet Union R. Ya. Malinovsky.

By 1976, after his graduation, Yakubov became the chief of staff of a tank regiment in the Kiev Military District. In 1978, he graduated from the Higher Officer Course “Vystrel” named after Marshal of the Soviet Union B. M. Shaposhnikov. Between September 1979 and August 1984, he commanded the 317th Guards Tank Regiment in the 22nd Guards Tank Division of the 6th Guards Tank Army based in Dnipropetrovsk.

In 1982, he was deputy commander and commander of the 17th Guards Tank Division in the Kiev Military District. In June 1985, Yakubov was transferred as commander of the 90th Guards Tank Division in East Germany. About two years later, he was the first deputy commander of the 8th Guards Army in the Group of Soviet Forces in East Germany, and was promoted to major general. A serious indicator of the integrity of Yu. Yakubov's military service is the fact that he received three military ranks ahead of schedule, which was an extremely rare case.

In 1990, Yakubov graduated from the Military Academy of the General Staff of the Armed Forces named after K. E. Voroshilov. After his graduation, he served as chief of staff - first deputy commander of the 35th Combined Arms Army in the Far Eastern Military District. In October 1991, he was the commander of the 6th Army in the Leningrad Military District.

On 13 February 1992, Yakubov was promoted to lieutenant general, and in June 1994, he became deputy commander of the Far Eastern Military District. On 2 August 1999, Yakubov was appointed as commander of the Far Eastern Military District, where he was promoted to colonel general.

On 22 February 2003, Yakubov was promoted to Army General. On 10 September 2006, Yakubov retired upon reaching the age limit for military service.

=== Post-military career ===
Yakubov maintained strong ties with his hometown of Velikiye Luki following his retirement, participating in many citywide events.

With the creation of the Service of Inspectors General of the Ministry of Defence in 2008, Yakubov became a leading analyst there. In 2010 he became an assistant to the Minister of Defence, and since 2013 he has served as the senior officer in the Office of Inspectors General.

== Personal life ==
Yakubov currently lives in Moscow. He is married and has two sons.
