= 22nd Guards Combined Arms Army =

- Great emblem
- Active: 1990 – c. July 2009
- Country: Soviet Union, Russian Federation
- Branch: Soviet Army, Russian Ground Forces
- Size: one Motor Rifle division, two Artillery/Missile brigades, one MLRS regiment and other auxiliary brigades/regiments
- Part of: Moscow Military District
- Garrison/HQ: Nizhny Novgorod
- Decorations: Order of the Red Banner
- Battle honours: Königsberg

The 22nd Guards Army was a field army of the Russian Ground Forces, part of the Moscow Military District. It was active from 1990 to 2009. The order for the formation's dissolution was signed by the Minister of Defence on 1 June 2009.

It was formed in 1990 as the 22nd Guards Army from an army corps.

== History ==
The 22nd Guards Army headquarters was redesignated from the previous 13th Guards Army Corps in 1990 in the Moscow Military District at Nizhny Novgorod, as the 22nd Guards Konigsberg Red Banner Army, inheriting the awards and honorifics of the corps. Initially it controlled the 31st Tank Division, withdrawn from the Central Group of Forces in Czechoslovakia and the 47th Guards Tank Division formerly from the Group of Soviet Forces in Germany, as well as the 166th Separate Motor Rifle Brigade (Tver) (which was formerly the 6th Guards Motor Rifle Division with the Northern Group of Forces in Poland), the 211th Artillery Brigade, the 918th Multiple Rocket Launcher Regiment (both at Mulino), and two helicopter regiments. However, manpower levels were low; the tank divisions were reported to be at an establishment of 2,193 each and the 166th Motor Rifle Brigade at 3,638.

By June 1998 the two tank divisions had been merged as the new 3rd Motor Rifle Division, and the new division was designated at as 'constant readiness' formation, to be maintained at at least 80% strength. Also, the 166th Motor Rifle Brigade has now been reduced to a storage base as the 70th Base for Storage of Weapons and Equipment (VkhVT).

=== Composition in 2000s ===
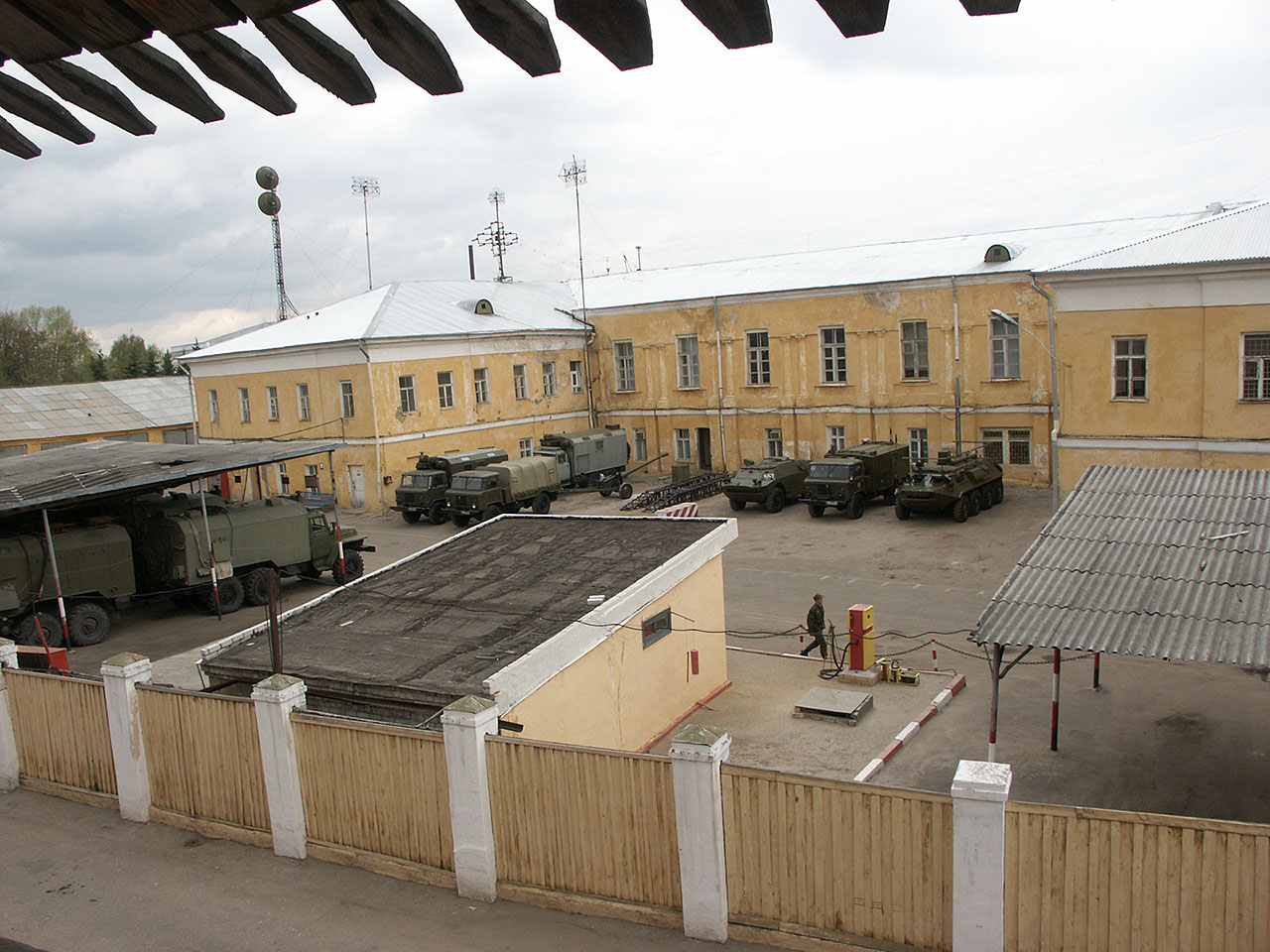
The headquarters site of the 22nd Guards Combined Arms Army in May 2006.

- Headquarters - Nizhny Novgorod
  - 3rd Motor Rifle Division - Mulino (Nizhny Novgorod)
  - 50th Rocket Brigade - Shuya (OTR-21 Tochka-U surface to surface missiles)
  - 211th Artillery Brigade — Mulino
  - 5th Anti-Aircraft Rocket Brigade - Shuya
  - 918th Multiple Rocket Launcher Regiment;— Mulino
  - 490th Separate Combat Control Helicopter Regiment (490 OVP BU) (Mi-24, Mi-8) (Tula - Klokovo, Tula Oblast)
  - 214th Separate Helicopter Squadron (214 OVE) (Mi-24, Mi-8) (Kursk)
  - 253rd Separate Helicopter Squadron (253 OVE) (Mi-24, Mi-8) (Kostroma)
  - 70th 'Vitebsko-Novgorod' Armament Storage Base (former 166th 'Vitebsko-Novgorod' Guards Separate Motor Rifle Brigade/6th GMRD) (Tver)
  - 1174th Armament Storage Base (New Smolino, Nizhni Novgorod Oblast)
  - 6325th Armament Storage Base (Vyazniki, Vladimir Oblast)
  - 22nd Central Base for the Reserve and Repair of Tanks (V/Ch 42713) (T-80U/UM/UD, BTR-80) (Buy, Kostroma Oblast)
  - other auxiliary brigades and regiments

General Alexey Merkuryev was the army commander in 2004. The 3rd Motor Rifle Division and the storage base at Tver were identified as the main formations of the army in mid-2005.

The army headquarters was disbanded on 1 June 2009, as part of wider reforms of the Russian Ground Forces, and the 20th Guards Army headquarters moved to the 22nd Army's old base at Mulino in August 2010.
