= Office of Inspectors General =

Body of the Russian Defence Ministry

Office of Inspectors General of the Ministry of Defence of the Russian Federation
- Управление генеральных инспекторов Министерства обороны Российской Федерации
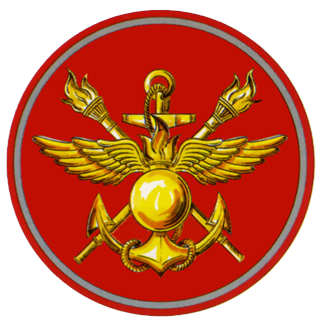
- Military inspectors' emblem

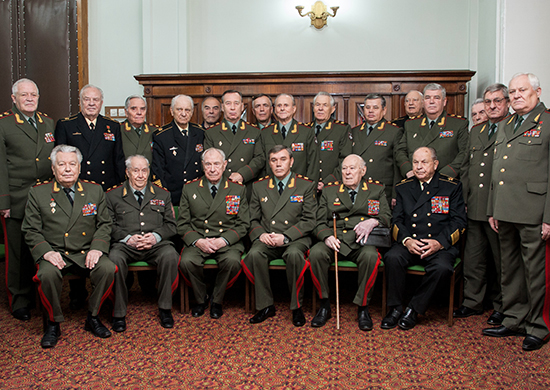
- Members of the Office of Inspectors General in 2013

Agency overview
- Formed: 26 June 2008
- Preceding agency: Group of Inspectors General (1958–1992)
- Jurisdiction: Russian Ministry of Defence
- Headquarters: Znamenka 19, Moscow, Russia; 55°44′56″N 37°36′8″E
- Minister responsible: Gen. Yuri Yakubov
- Website: www.mil.ru

The Office of Inspectors General of the Ministry of Defence of the Russian Federation (Russian: Управление генеральных инспекторов Министерства обороны Российской Федерации) is a constituent part of the Russian Ministry of Defence and the successor to the Soviet-era Group of Inspectors General.

== Predecessor ==
The Group of Inspectors General of the Soviet Ministry of Defence was established on 12 February 1958 under order No. 037 of Defence Minister Rodion Malinovsky, on the basis of decree No. 149-63 of the Council of Ministers of the Soviet Union on 30 January 1958. This was intended to establish "for use in In the Armed Forces, the accumulated knowledge and experience of marshals, admirals, army generals, colonel generals and some lieutenant generals and vice admirals who have reached such an age when, for health reasons and the prospects for their further use, cannot continue to work with a full load ..." By the late Soviet period it had become a sinecure position for senior officers. Its numbers were reduced by Defence Minister Dmitry Yazov in 1988, and it was abolished during the 1992 reforms of Marshal Yevgeny Shaposhnikov. At the time of its abolition it consisted of 53 senior officers.

== Establishment ==
The concept of an organisation in the Defence Ministry to bring together the expertise of retired senior officers was revisited by Russian Defence Minister Anatoliy Serdyukov, with the signing of directive No. D-31 on 28 April 2008. This envisaged the creation of the Service of Inspectors General, the main task of which was "to promote the organization of combat and operational training of troops, the construction and further development of the Armed Forces of the Russian Federation, the development of the theory and history of military art, and the education of personnel." On 26 June 2008 the Defence Minister published order No. 345 "On the Service of Inspectors General of the Ministry of Defence", bringing the service into being. In 2011, the Service of Inspectors General was renamed the Office of Inspectors General.

The office is located in the Apraksin House at 19 Znamenka, the ministry's administrative building. It includes a library, opened in 2015, containing works by inspectors general. It has been headed since 2013 by General of the Army Yuri Yakubov.

== Membership ==
At its establishment in 2008 the office included former marshals of the Soviet Union, generals of the army, admirals of the fleet, marshals of artillery, air marshals and colonel generals. Total membership is around thirty, changing as members die, and new members are appointed. Though members remain retired from the military during their service, they receive a salary.
