= Aleksandr Dvornikov =

Russian army general (born 1961)

- Александр Владимирович Дворников
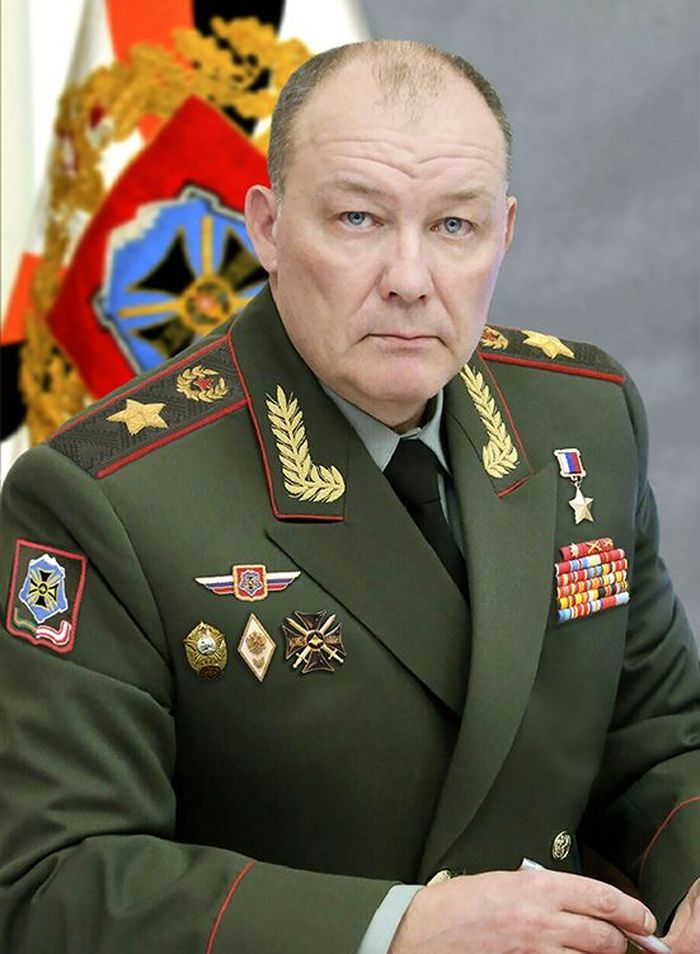
- Official portrait, 2021
- Born: 22 August 1961 (age 65); Ussuriysk, Primorsky Krai, Soviet Union
- Military career
- Allegiance: Soviet Union (to 1991); Russia
- Branch: Soviet Army; Russian Ground Forces
- Service years: 1978–2023
- Rank: General of the Army
- Nickname: Butcher of Syria
- Commands: 19th Motor Rifle Division; 5th Red Banner Army; Central Military District (interim); Group of Forces in Syria; Southern Military District; Group of Forces South in the Special Military Operation; Special Military Operation
- Conflicts: Second Chechen War; Syrian Civil War; Battle of Aleppo; Russo-Ukrainian war; Southern Ukraine campaign
- Awards: Hero of the Russian Federation; Order "For Merit to the Fatherland" 4th class; Order of Courage; Order for Service to the Homeland in the Armed Forces of the USSR 3rd class; Order of Military Merit; Medal of the Order "For Merit to the Fatherland" 2nd class

General of the Army Aleksandr Vladimirovich Dvornikov (Note: In this name that follows East Slavic naming customs, the patronymic is Vladimirovich and the family name is Dvornikov.) (Note: Russian: Александр Владимирович Дворников) (born 22 August 1961) is a Russian retired military officer who was the first field commander of the Russian military intervention in Syria, from 2015 to 2016, and of the Russo-Ukrainian war in 2022.

After joining the Soviet Army in 1978, Dvornikov rose through the ranks of the Soviet and then Russian army over a period of thirty years. In 2015, he became commander of the Russian Armed Forces in Syria during the Russian military intervention there. At that time he cemented a reputation for the harsh conduct of his military campaigns as those in Chechnya before. He was awarded the title Hero of the Russian Federation in 2016 and was promoted to general of the army in 2020. Dvornikov has written extensively about tactics and training in Russian military journals.

In February 2022, he was the commander of the Southern Military District and led the southern front at the start of the Russo-Ukrainian war, which was the most successful during the first stage of the war. In April 2022, according to US officials, Dvornikov was placed in charge of all forces in Ukraine. However, his appointment was never official confirmed. According to CIT, he was replaced with Colonel General Gennady Zhidko late in May 2022. He was replaced at the Southern Military District by Colonel General Sergey Kuzovlev in January 2023. From February to December 2024, he was the chairman of DOSAAF of Russia.

== Early life and Soviet military career ==
Dvornikov was born on 22 August 1961 in Ussuriysk. He graduated from the Ussuriysk Suvorov Military School in 1978 and joined the Soviet Army. Dvornikov received further education at the Moscow High Command Training School, graduating in 1982. From 1982, he served in the Far Eastern Military District as a platoon and then company commander, and as a battalion chief of staff. In 1991, Dvornikov graduated from the Frunze Military Academy. He became a deputy battalion commander in the Western Group of Forces.

== Russian military career ==
=== Career in the Russian Ground Forces ===
Between 1992 and 1994, Dvornikov commanded the 154th Separate Motor Rifle Battalion of the 6th Separate Guards Motor Rifle Brigade. In 1995, he became chief of staff and deputy commander of the 10th Guards Tank Division's 248th Motor Rifle Regiment. Dvornikov became regimental commander in 1996. On 20 January 1996, he was awarded the Order of Military Merit. On 2 February 1996, he was awarded the Order of Courage.

In 1997, he transferred to command the 1st Guards Motor Rifle Regiment of the 2nd Guards Tamanskaya Motor Rifle Division in the Moscow Military District. Between 2000 and 2003 he was chief of staff and then commander of the 19th Motor Rifle Division in the North Caucasus Military District. On 6 May 2000, he was awarded the Order "For Merit to the Fatherland" 4th class with swords. Dvornikov graduated from the Military Academy of the General Staff in 2005.

In 2005, Dvornikov became deputy commander and chief of staff of the 36th Army in the Siberian Military District. In 2008, he took command of the 5th Red Banner Army. Dvornikov became deputy commander of the Eastern Military District in 2011. From May 2012 to June 2016, he served as chief of staff and first deputy commander of the Central Military District. Between November and December 2012, he was acting commander of the district.

On 13 December 2012, Dvornikov became a lieutenant general. On 13 December 2014, he was promoted to colonel general.

=== Syrian civil war ===
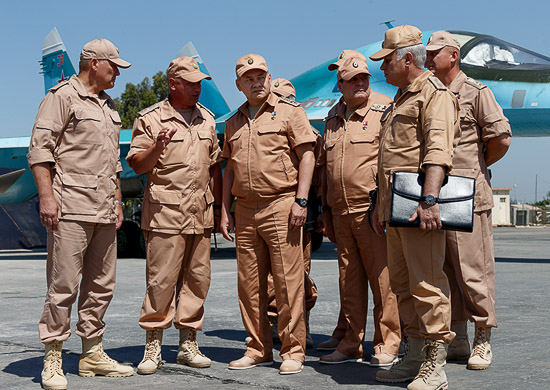
Dvornikov (2nd from the left), Russian Defense Minister Sergey Shoigu alongside other Russian advisors at Khmeimim Air Base, June 2016.

Around 30 September 2015, Dvornikov became the first commander of the Group of Forces in Syria during the Russian intervention in the Syrian civil war. On 17 March 2016, he was awarded the title Hero of the Russian Federation for his leadership.

In July 2016, Dvornikov became the Southern Military District's acting commander. He was confirmed in the position on 20 September 2016.

In 2018, Dvornikov wrote an article in Vestnik, the journal of the Russian Academy of Military Sciences, describing the campaign in Syria as an integrated air-ground campaign, in which the main ground element was the Syrian Arab Army, and as one that used siege warfare. He also wrote that during the Battle of Aleppo a grouping was created to deliver strikes on targets along the outer ring of the city, working in three shifts for constant fire impact on enemy positions.

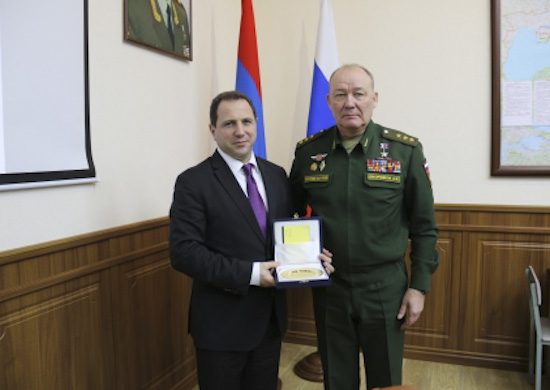
Dvornikov with Armenian Defence Minister David Tonoyan, February 2019.

In March 2019, the European Union enacted sanctions on him due to his role in the Kerch Strait incident.

By a decree from President Putin, Dvornikov was promoted to the rank of army general on 23 June 2020. This made him one of four active-duty officers told hold the rank at that time, along with Chief of the General Staff Valery Gerasimov, Ground Forces commander Oleg Salyukov, and Aerospace Forces commander Sergey Surovikin. This, among other factors, led some observers to see him as a potential successor to Gerasimov as the Chief of the General Staff.

=== Russian invasion of Ukraine ===
At the start of the 2022 Russian invasion of Ukraine, Dvornikov, as the commander of the Southern Military District, was the first commander of the Group of Forces South. It was the only one of the four groups of forces that achieved its initial objectives, outmaneuvering the Ukrainian military in southern Ukraine, capturing Kherson Oblast and the Zaporizhzhia Nuclear Power Plant, and amassing firepower for the Battle of Mariupol. On 10 April 2022, Dvornikov was reportedly placed in complete charge of the entire invasion, though the Russian General Staff still did not form a separate Joint Group of Forces and command center at that point. However, this appointment was never officially confirmed.

In May 2022, according to the open-source intelligence group Conflict Intelligence Team, citing Russian soldiers, he was replaced as field commander by Colonel General Gennady Zhidko; However, on 5 June Ukrainian governor of Luhansk Oblast Serhiy Haidai said Dvornikov was still in command and had been given until 10 June by his superiors to complete the Battle of Severodonetsk. On 25 June 2022, it was again reported that Dvornikov had been dismissed from his post.

He was sanctioned by Canada under the Special Economic Measures Act (S.C. 1992, c. 17) in relation to the Russian invasion of Ukraine for Grave Breach of International Peace and Security, and by the UK government in 2019 in relation to the Russo-Ukrainian War.

On 8 October 2022, the Russian Defence Ministry named Air Force General Sergey Surovikin as the overall commander of Russian forces fighting in Ukraine without naming who Surovikin was replacing. According to analyst John Hardie, writing for the Long War Journal, Surovikin was likely the first official overall commander. In January 2023, Dvornikov was relieved of command of the Southern Military District by Colonel General Sergey Kuzovlev, according to sources in the Ministry of Defense, though an official announcement was not made.

== Post-military career ==
After his replacement as field commander in Ukraine, he largely remained out of public activity, until he was appointed on 3 February 2024 as the chairman of public-volunteer organization DOSAAF. In December 2024 Dvornikov received a new job and was replaced as the head of DOSAAF.

== Military reputation ==
Dvornikov's military reputation is often cited in the international press for the harsh conduct of his military campaigns, particularly in Chechnya and Syria. He has been accused of having pursued scorched earth tactics. Retired US Navy Admiral James G. Stavridis spoke in an interview of what he said was a known epithet of Dvornikov, "Butcher of Syria".

However, the Institute for the Study of War has noted that although Dvornikov's tenure was marked by large numbers of civilian deaths, it was not especially bloody compared to the operation as a whole, as the Russian military targeted Syrian civilians and critical infrastructure throughout its intervention in Syria. According to an investigation by Cathrin Schaer and Emad Hassan published in the German state-funded media Deutsche Welle, statistics also show that Dvornikov did not open up a new and more violent chapter in the Syrian war.

Some observers, including American military officers, considered Dvornikov to be one of the most "forward-thinking" and effective Russian generals, and a likely candidate to replace Valery Gerasimov as Chief of the General Staff before the spring 2022 battle of the Donbass. Dvornikov's group of forces was the most successful at the start of the invasion, and he had been the first commander of Russian forces in Syria, an experience that had an impact on his views of training and tactics. He had written extensively about subjects such as force-on-force maneuver training, close air support integration in tactical organizations, and junior officer development. American military observers believed that he had a vision for reforms to the Russian military in the event of becoming CGS, but he seems to have fallen out of favor due to a lack of progress in the Donbass. The Jamestown Foundation described Dvornikov as one of the generals that were "fighting the last war" by using tactics that had been effective in Syria but were less relevant in the conditions of Ukraine.

== See also ==
- List of Heroes of the Russian Federation

== Notes ==
Military offices
Preceded by Anatoly Sidorov	Commander of the 5th Guards Combined Arms Army; 2008–2011	Succeeded by Andrey Serdyukov
Preceded by Aleksandr Galkin	Commander of the Southern Military District; 2016–2023	Succeeded by Sergey Kuzovlev
Position created	Commander of the Group of Forces South in the Special Military Operation; 2022	Succeeded by Arkady Marzoyev
Position created	Commander of the Special Military Operation; 2022	Succeeded by Gennady Zhidko
Civic offices
Preceded by Aleksandr Kolmakov	Chairman of DOSAAF of Russia; 2024	Succeeded by Aleksey Zavizon; Acting
