= Sergey Kuzovlev =

Russian military officer

Colonel General Sergey Kuzovlev
- Сергей Юрьевич Кузовлев
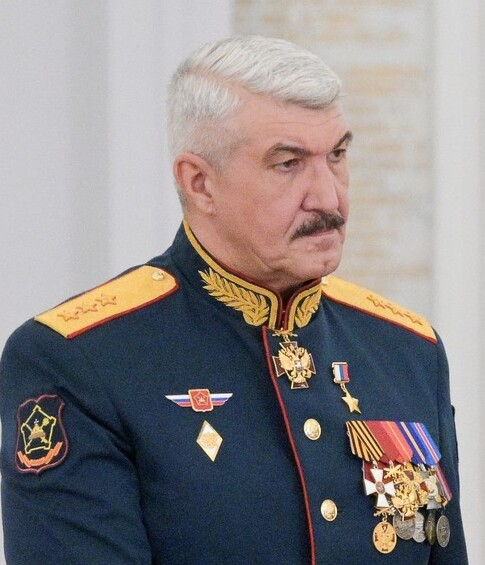
- Born: Sergey Yuryevich Kuzovlev; 7 January 1967 (age 59); Michurinsk, Russia, Soviet Union
- Military career
- Allegiance: Soviet Union (to 1991); Russia
- Service years: 1985–present
- Rank: Colonel general
- Commands: Moscow Military District; Southern Military District; Western Military District
- Conflicts: Syrian Civil War; Russo-Ukrainian War; War in Donbas; Russo-Ukrainian war (2022–present); Wagner Group rebellion; 2023 Ukrainian counteroffensive

Sergey Yuryevich Kuzovlev (Russian: Сергей Юрьевич Кузовлев; born 7 January 1967) is a Russian military officer. As of May 2024, he holds the rank of colonel general, and commands the Moscow Military District.

== Biography ==
Sergey Kuzovlev was born in Michurinsk on 7 January 1967. He studied at school number 21 in the city of Michurinsk, Tambov Oblast, from 1974 to 1984. In 1990, he graduated from the Ryazan Higher Airborne Command School (6th company).

Kuzovlev commanded the 506th Guards Motorized Rifle Poznan Red Banner Order of Suvorov Regiment (military unit 21617, Totsky District, Orenburg Oblast) of the 27th Guards Motor Rifle Division, and served in the First and Second Chechen wars. He graduated from the Combined Arms Academy. From February 2005 to July 2008, he commanded the 15th Separate Motor Rifle Brigade of the Volga-Urals Military District. In May 2005, he was promoted to colonel. In 2008 he entered the Military Academy of the General Staff, after graduating in July 2010 he was appointed commander of the 18th Separate Guards Motor Rifle Brigade.

At the beginning of 2014, he was appointed chief of staff of the 58th Combined Arms Army of the Southern Military District, and on 22 February of the same year, he was promoted to major general. At the end of August 2015, the Security Service of Ukraine announced that Kuzovlev had commanded the Russian forces in the Luhansk People’s Republic's 2nd Army Corps from autumn 2014 to winter 2015, during the armed conflict in eastern Ukraine. Russian sources denied that statement.

From July 2015 to August 2016, Kuzovlev was the Commander of the 20th Guards Combined Arms Army of the Western Military District. From August 2016 to January 2017, he was the Commander of the 58th Combined Arms Army of the Southern Military District. In March 2017, Kuzovlev was appointed commander of the newly formed 8th Guards Combined Arms Army of the Southern Military District. On 10 June 2017, he was awarded the military rank of lieutenant general. In February 2019, he was appointed Chief of Staff - First Deputy Commander of the Southern Military District.

From November 2020 to February 2021, Kuzovlev was the Commander of the Group of Forces of the Armed Forces of Russia in Syria.

In June 2021, Kuzovlev became the ex officio Acting Commander of the Southern Military District. On 18 February 2021, Kuzovlev was promoted to the rank of Colonel General. On 13 December 2022, Kuzolev officially became the commander of the Western Military District.

According to Ukrainian intelligence, Kuzovlev was commander of the troops of the Western Military District for slightly more than a month, until 26 December 2022. It was announced on 23 January 2023 that Kuzovlev had been transferred to command the Southern Military District, being succeeded by Lieutenant General Yevgeny Nikiforov in the Western Military District. During his command, the Wagner Group rebellion broke out on 23–24 June 2023, which saw the mercenary group briefly occupy his headquarters.

Kuzovlev was awarded the title of Hero of the Russian Federation from Russian president Vladimir Putin on 9 December 2025, for the results of his Group of Forces in Kupiansk. the Heroes of the Fatherland Day, in a ceremony at the Kremlin. As of December 23, 2025, the media sources were noting his recent absence after having claimed Russian control over Kupiansk.

Military offices
Preceded by Aleksandr Chaiko	Commander of the 20th Combined Arms Army; 2015–2016	Succeeded by Yevgeny Nikiforov
Preceded by Andrey Gurulyov	Commander of the 58th Combined Arms Army; 2016–2017	Succeeded by Yevgeny Nikiforov
Preceded by Position established	Commander of the 8th Guards Combined Arms Army; 2017–2019	Succeeded by Andrei Sychevoi
Preceded by Mikhail Teplinsky	Chief of Staff and First Deputy Commander of the Southern Military District; 2019–2022	Succeeded by Sergey Medvedev
Preceded by Aleksandr Chaiko	Commander of the Group of Forces in the Syrian Arab Republic; 2020–2021	Succeeded by Aleksandr Chaiko
Preceded by Roman Berdnikov	Commander of the Western Military District; 2022	Succeeded by Yevgeny Nikiforov
Preceded by Aleksandr Dvornikov	Commander of the Southern Military District; 2023–2024	Succeeded by Gennady Anashkin; Acting
District re-established	Commander of the Moscow Military District; 2024–present	Incumbent
