= Uglegorsky =

Uglegorsky (masculine), Uglegorskaya (feminine), or Uglegorskoye (neuter) may refer to:

- Uglegorsky District, a district of Sakhalin Oblast, Russia
- Uglegorskoye Urban Settlement, a municipal formation which the town of district significance of Uglegorsk and nine rural localities in Uglegorsky District of Sakhalin Oblast, Russia are incorporated as
- Uglegorsky (rural locality), a rural locality (a settlement) in Rostov Oblast, Russia
