= Aleksandr Galkin =

Aleksandr Galkin may refer to:

- Aleksandr Galkin (footballer) (born 1948), Russian football coach and former football player
- Aleksandr Galkin (chess player) (born 1979), Russian chess player and grandmaster
- Aleksandr Galkin (general) (born 1958), Russian military officer
