= Mikhail Teplinsky =

Russian general (b. 1969)

- Михаил Юрьевич Теплинский (Russian)
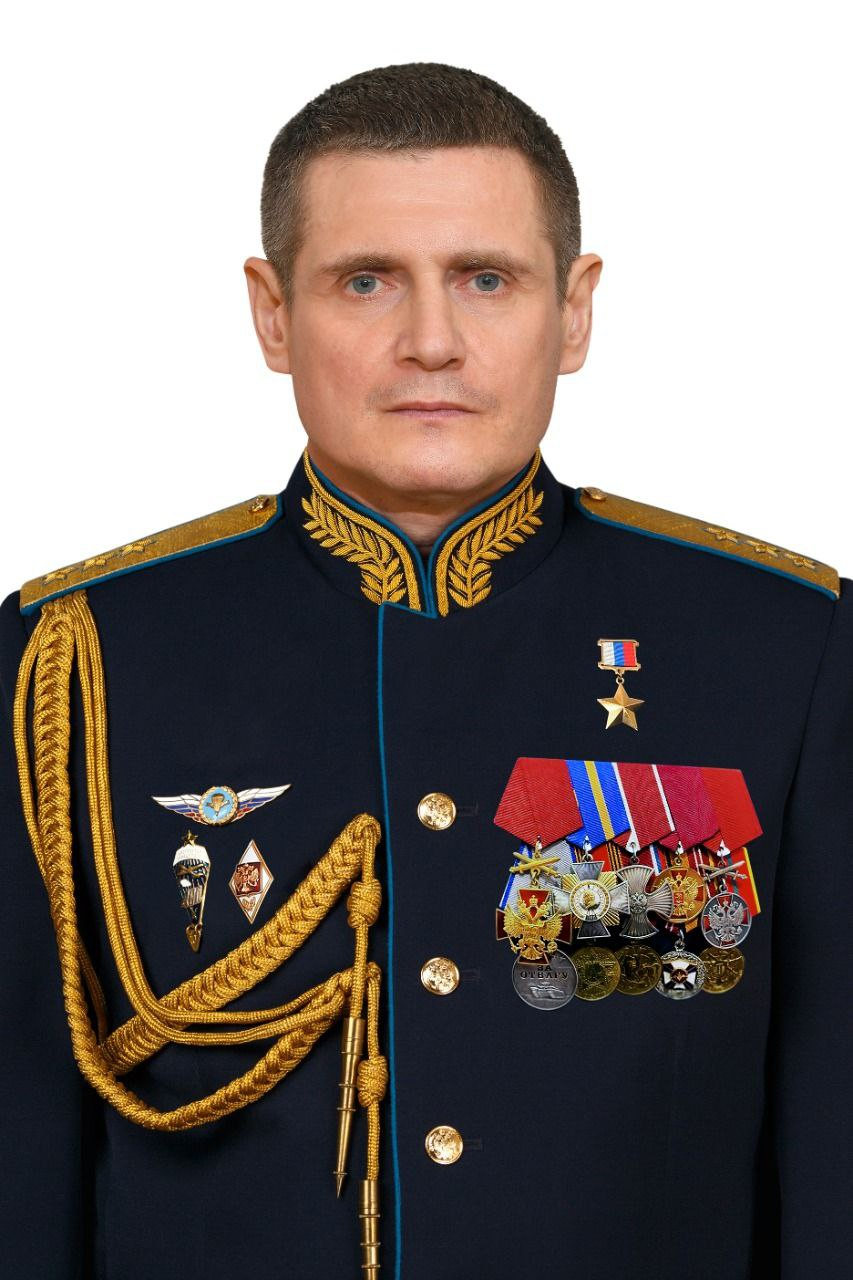
- Official portrait, 2022
- Born: Mikhail Yuryevich Teplinsky; Mykhailo Yuriiovych Teplynskyi; 9 January 1969 (age 57); Mospyne, Ukrainian SSR, Soviet Union
- Military career
- Allegiance: Soviet Union; Russia
- Branch: Soviet Airborne Forces; Russian Airborne Forces
- Service years: 1991–present
- Rank: Colonel General
- Commands: Commander of the Russian Airborne Forces; 36th Guards Combined Arms Army
- Conflicts: Transnistria War; First Chechen War; Second Chechen War; Russo-Ukrainian War; War in Donbas; Russo-Ukrainian war (2022–present); 2023 Ukrainian counteroffensive
- Awards: Hero of the Russian Federation (1995)

Colonel General Mikhail Yuryevich Teplinsky (Note: Russian: Михаил Юрьевич Теплинский; Ukrainian: Михайло Юрійович Теплинський, romanized: Mykhailo Yuriiovych Teplynskyi) (born 9 January 1969) is a Ukrainian-born Russian military officer who has served as commander of the Russian Airborne Forces since 2022. He graduated from the Ryazan Guards Higher Airborne Command School in 1991, and was awarded the title Hero of the Russian Federation in 1995, during the First Chechen war.

== Military career ==
Mikhail Teplinsky was born in Mospyne, in what was then the Ukrainian Soviet Socialist Republic, in the Soviet Union, on 9 January 1969. In 1987 he entered and in 1991 graduated from the Ryazan Higher Airborne Command School. He served in the 106th Guards Airborne Division stationed in Tula. He commanded an airborne reconnaissance platoon and a reconnaissance company of the 137th Guards Airborne Regiment. From 1992 to 1993, he took part in the Transnistria War. From December 1994 to March 1995 he participated in the First Chechen War. He distinguished himself in battles while crossing the Sunzha River. During the period of hostilities, senior lieutenant Teplinsky had about 30 destroyed militants on his personal combat account. For courage and heroism shown during the performance of a special task, by decree of the President of Russia of 1 March 1995, Senior Lieutenant Teplinsky was awarded the title of Hero of the Russian Federation. While still in Chechnya, he received a promotion in rank and position: he became the captain and head of intelligence of the parachute regiment.

In 1999, Teplinsky graduated from the Combined Arms Academy of the Armed Forces of Russia. He took command of a paratrooper battalion that year, and went on to fight in the Second Chechen War. Transferred to the 76th Guards Airborne Division in Pskov, he was chief of staff and commander of the 234th Guards Airborne Regiment of the Black Sea. He became a Guard Colonel in 2002. In October 2002, he was appointed deputy commander of the 76th Guards Airborne Division, and since 2003 he was its chief of staff.

In 2007, Teplinsky graduated from the Military Academy of the General Staff of the Armed Forces of Russia. In June 2007, he was appointed head of the 212th Guards District Training Center Vienna named after the Hero of the Soviet Union, Lieutenant General I. N. Russiyanov (Siberian Military District, Chita Oblast). Since June 2009, he was the Chief of Staff – 1st Deputy Commander of the 20th Guards Combined Arms Army of the Western Military District in Mulino, Nizhny Novgorod Oblast. Teplinsky was promoted to Guards Major General in 2012.

On 19 February 2013, Teplinsky became the Commanding General of the 36th Combined Arms Army of the Eastern Military District, and became a lieutenant general on 13 December 2014. In May 2015, he was appointed chief of staff of the territorial troops in the Southern Military District.

According to the Main Directorate of Intelligence of the Ministry of Defence of Ukraine, Teplinksy provided support to the armed forces of the self-proclaimed Donetsk and Luhansk People's Republic.

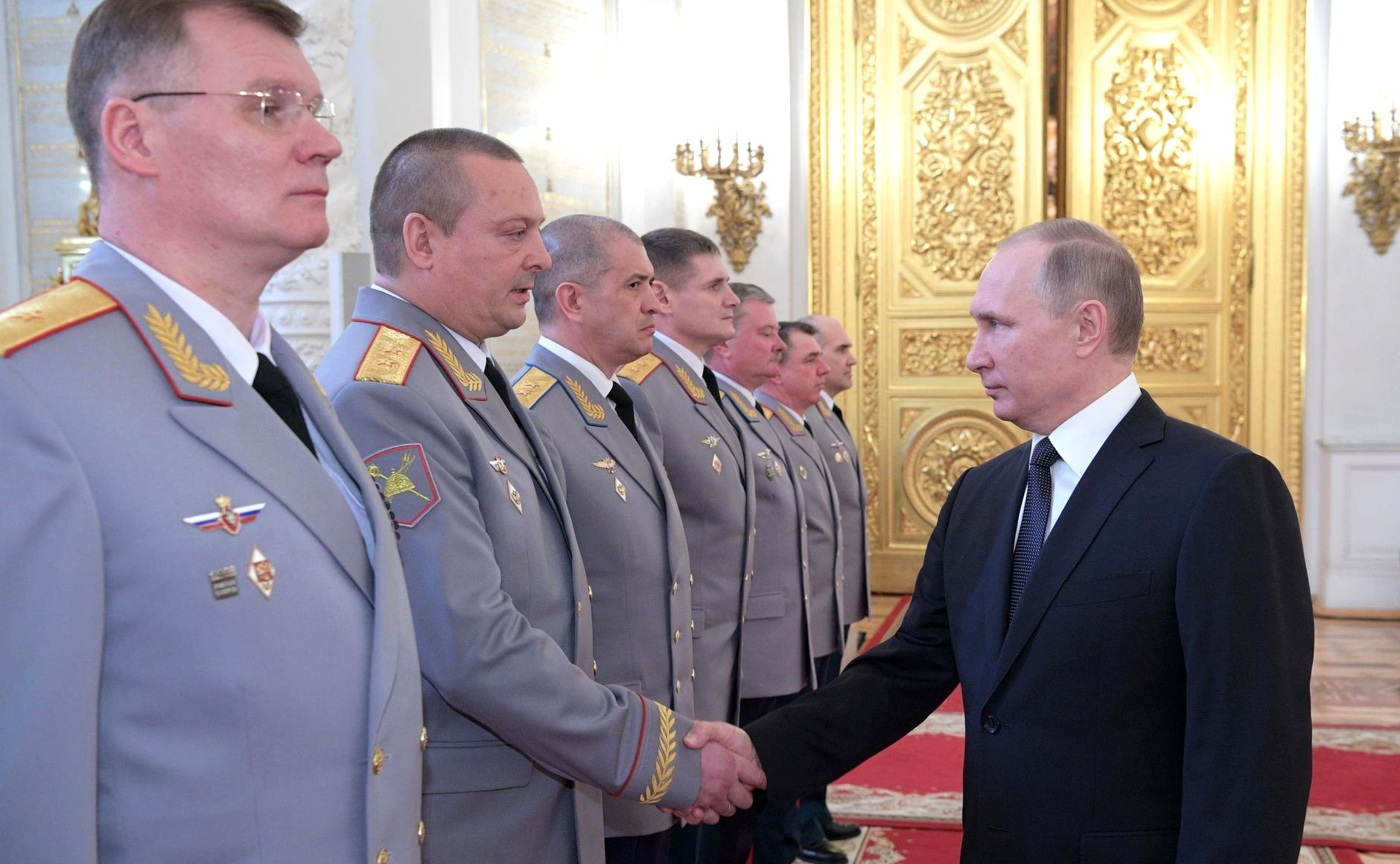
Teplinsky along with Igor Konashenkov (far left) with other military officers meeting with Vladimir Putin in March 2017

On 14 March 2017, by decree of the President of Russia, Teplinsky was appointed Chief of Staff - First Deputy Commander of the Southern Military District. On 5 April 2019, Teplinsky was appointed Chief of Staff - First Deputy Commanding General of the Central Military District. By Decree of the President of Russia dated in December 2021, Teplinsky was promoted to Colonel General.

=== Russo-Ukrainian war ===
In June 2022, Teplinsky was appointed commanding general of the Russian Airborne Forces. In January 2023, according to The Moscow Times, and to British Intelligence, Teplinsky was dismissed as the commanding general of the Russian Airborne Forces.

Since 13 December 2022, Teplinsky has been under British sanctions.

In April 2023 Kremlin Press Secretary Dmitry Peskov confirmed that Teplinsky remains commander of the airborne troops, and serves as a deputy commander of the Joint Grouping of Forces (the Russian troops in Ukraine). In April 2023, the British government department believed his "turbulent career", including his return to a major role in Ukraine, was indicative of tensions arising within the Russian General Staff. Indeed, while Valery Gerasimov formally retained his title of Chief of the General Staff in Ukraine in the aftermath of the Wagner Group rebellion, his public disappearance started rumours about Teplinsky taking over and actually running the war.

In October 2023 Teplinsky was promoted to commander of the Dnepr Battlegroup. He replaced Colonel-General Oleg Makarevich. By the end of 2023, he had presided over a wartime expansion of the Airborne Forces, creating one new division (the 44th Air Assault), reforming the 31st Guards Brigade into the 104th Guards Division, adding a third airborne regiment to the 98th Guards and 106th Guards divisions, and creating the 52nd Artillery Brigade as a general artillery support brigade. Under Teplinsky, the service grew from ten maneuver regiments and three separate brigades to fifteen maneuver regiments, two separate brigades, and one artillery brigade.

On 12 March 2024 the AFU claimed to have killed Teplinsky in an airstrike on the oil tanker Mechanic Pogodin. On 30 June 2024, reports in the press abounded that he was severely wounded by a Ukrainian missile strike in Henichesk. However, on 2 August 2024, a video of Teplinsky congratulating his troops on Paratroopers' Day and speaking about recent events on the front was published.

== Family ==
Teplinsky is married, with two sons and a daughter.

== See also ==
- List of Heroes of the Russian Federation

== Notes ==
Military offices
Preceded by Oleg Makarevich	Commander of the 36th Guards Combined Arms Army; 2013–2015	Succeeded by Dmitry Kovalenko
Preceded by Alexander Zhuravlyov	Chief of Staff and First Deputy Commander of the Southern Military District; 2017–2019	Succeeded by Sergey Kuzovlev
Preceded by Yevgeny Ustinov	Chief of Staff and First Deputy Commander of the Central Military District; 2019–2022	Succeeded by
Preceded by Andrey Serdyukov	Commander of the Russian Airborne Forces; 2022–present	Incumbent
