= Alexander Romanchuk =

Russian colonel general

Alexander Vladimirovich Romanchuk
- Александр Владимирович Романчук
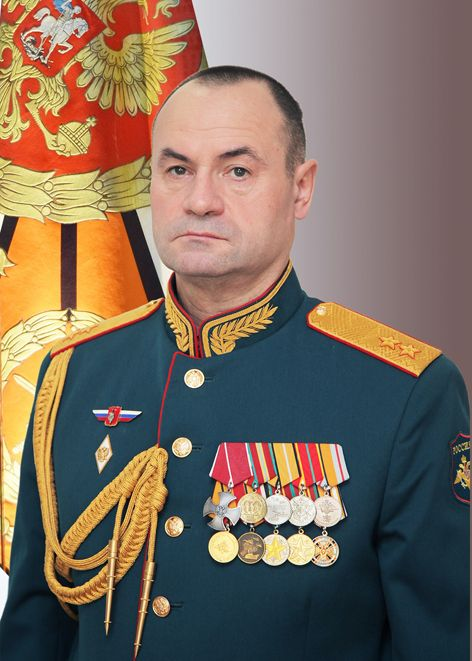
- Born: 15 April 1959 (age 67); Luhansk, Luhansk Oblast, Ukrainian SSR, Soviet Union
- Military career
- Allegiance: Russia
- Branch: Russian Armed Forces
- Service years: 1980–present
- Rank: Colonel general
- Commands: Head of the Combined Arms Academy; 29th Combined Arms Army Commander (2014); Chief military adviser to the Syrian Arab Army; Southern Military District Deputy Commander
- Conflicts: Syrian Civil War; Russo-Ukrainian War; Annexation of Crimea; War in Donbas; Russian invasion of Ukraine; 2023 Ukrainian counteroffensive

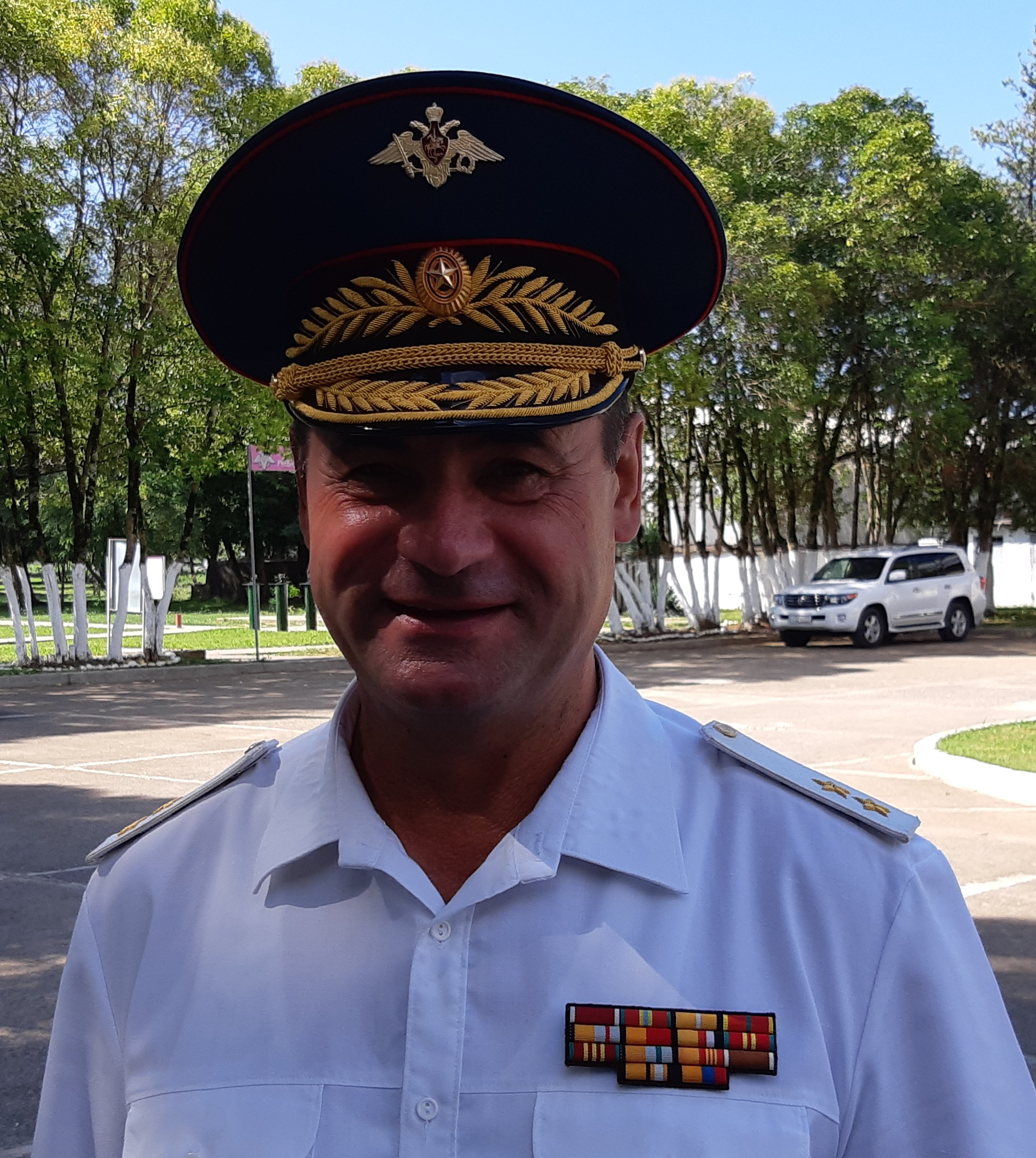
Romanchuk in 2018

Alexander Vladimirovich Romanchuk (Russian: Александр Владимирович Романчук; born 15 April 1959) is a colonel general in the Russian Armed Forces serving as the Deputy Commander of the Southern Military District during the 2023 Ukrainian counteroffensive.

== Biography ==
Romanchuk was born in Luhansk, then part of the Soviet Union, on 15 April 1959.

He served in various positions in the Russian armed forces, including as Head of the Combined Arms Academy, Commander of the 29th Combined Arms Army, Chief military adviser to the Syrian Arab Army and in his final posting as the Deputy Commander of the Southern Military District. He was involved in the Annexation of Crimea and the War in Donbas. He was promoted to colonel general in 2023.

=== Russian invasion of Ukraine ===
Romanchuk took much of the credit for Russian defenses during the early stages of the 2023 Ukrainian counteroffensive. He announced that the Ukrainian counteroffensive started at 2am on June 6, and on the same day Ukrainian forces lost 350 personnel and 30 tanks and 10 infantry fighting vehicles, including Western-supplied Leopard 2s. Romanchuk claimed the early success in the defense efforts was due mainly to Russian air superiority, military intelligence, and extensive minefields. Despite receiving praise, and positioning himself as overall commander, most of the credit for the defense goes to his superior commander in the Southern District, Sergey Kuzovlev, and his superior, Valery Gerasimov.

On September 22, 2023 Romanchuk was seriously injured during a Ukrainian missile attack on the headquarters of the Black Sea Fleet, according to Ukrainian military sources. He was most recently commander of the Russian forces in the Zaporizhzhia region.
