= Andrey Serdyukov =

Russian general (born 1962)

- Андрей Сердюков
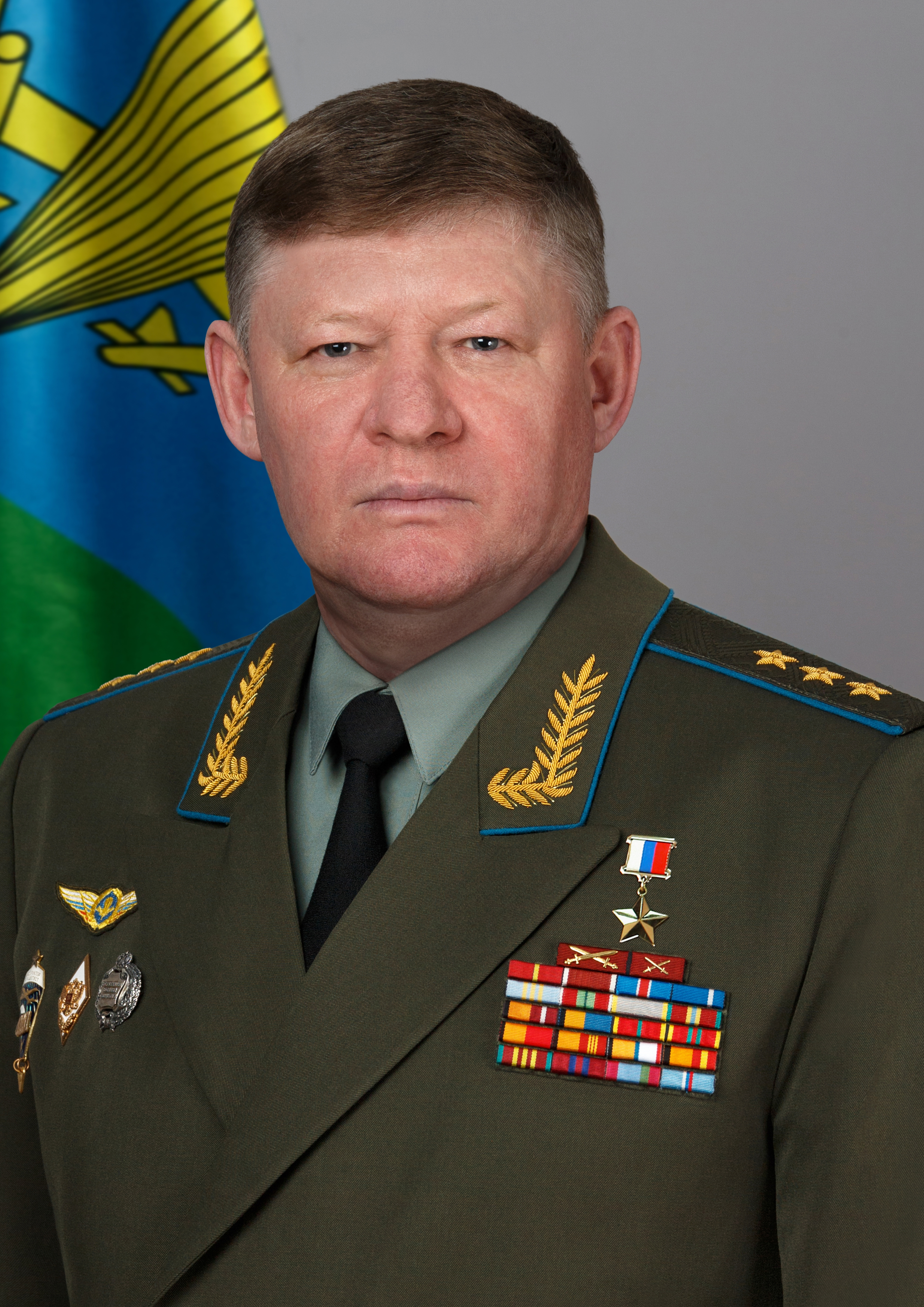
- Serdyukov in 2020
- Born: 4 March 1962 (age 64); Uglegorsky, Rostov Oblast, Russian SFSR, Soviet Union
- Military career
- Allegiance: Soviet Union (until 1991); Russia (since 1991)
- Branch: Soviet Airborne Forces; Russian Airborne Forces
- Service years: 1983–present
- Rank: Colonel General
- Commands: 138th Guards Motor Rifle Brigade; 106th Guards Airborne Division; 5th Red Banner Army; Russian Airborne Forces; Group of Russian Forces in Syria
- Conflicts: First Chechen War; Second Chechen War; War in Donbas (according to Ukraine); Syrian Civil War
- Awards: Hero of the Russian Federation Order "For Merit to the Fatherland" 3rd class Order "For Merit to the Fatherland" 4th class with Swords; Order of Alexander Nevsky; Order of Courage; Order of Honour; Order for Service to the Homeland in the Armed Forces of the USSR 3rd class Order of Military Merit

Colonel General Andrey Nikolayevich Serdyukov (Note: Russian: Андрей Николаевич Сердюков) (born 4 March 1962) is a Russian Airborne Forces officer who was commander of the Russian Airborne Forces from 2016 to 2022. He also commanded the Operational Group of the Russian Armed Forces in Syria from 2022 to 2023 and has been the Chief of the Joint Staff of the Collective Security Treaty Organization since 2023.

Serdyukov served in the Soviet Airborne Forces as a junior officer and rose to battalion command. He graduated from the Frunze Military Academy and became a deputy regimental commander in the Russian Airborne Troops and then a regimental commander. Serdyukov fought in the First Chechen War and served in the Russian military contingent in Kosovo, participating in the Incident at Pristina Airport. Between 2002 and 2003 he led the 138th Guards Motor Rifle Brigade and in 2004 took command of the 106th Guards Airborne Division.

After graduating from the Military Academy of the General Staff in 2009, Serdyukov became deputy commander of the 5th Red Banner Army, taking command of the army in 2011. In 2013, he became deputy commander and then chief of staff of the Southern Military District. While in this position, Serdyukov led troops in the annexation of Crimea by the Russian Federation and commanded Russian troops in the Donbas. He became commander of the Russian Airborne Troops in October 2016 and was replaced in June 2022 by Mikhail Teplinsky.

== Early life and career ==
According to official Russian sources, Serdyukov was born on 4 March 1962 in Uglegorsky, Tatsinsky District, Rostov Oblast. Other sources state he was born in Amvrosiivka. In 1983, he graduated from the Ryazan Higher Airborne Command School. He became commander of a reconnaissance platoon of the regimental reconnaissance company in the 104th Guards Airborne Division. Serdyukov became deputy company commander, company commander, chief of staff, deputy battalion commander, and then a battalion commander.

== Senior military career ==
In 1993, Serdyukov graduated from the Frunze Military Academy. He became deputy commander of a regiment in the 76th Guards Airborne Division. Serdyukov fought in the First Chechen War. In 1995 he took command of the 237th Guards Airborne Regiment in the division. Between 1997 and 1998 he was chief of staff, deputy commander, and commander of the 104th Guards Airborne Regiment in the division. He was later deputy commander of the division.

Serdyukov was for one year a deputy brigade commander in the Russian military contingent in Kosovo. In Kosovo, he participated in the Incident at Pristina airport, a standoff between the Russian troops and NATO peacekeeping forces.

Serdyukov served two one-year rotations in Chechnya.

On 10 March 2002, Serdyukov became acting commander of the 138th Guards Motor Rifle Brigade in the Leningrad Military District. He was confirmed in the post on 11 July 2002, and commanded the brigade until 9 June 2003. From June 2004 to 2007, Serdyukov was commander of the 106th Guards Airborne Division.

=== General staff (2009) ===
After his 2009 graduation from the Military Academy of the General Staff, Serdyukov became deputy commander of the 5th Red Banner Army. He took command of the army in January 2011.

In February 2013, Serdyukov became deputy commander of the Southern Military District. On 4 October 2013, Serdyukov became chief of staff and first deputy commander of the Southern Military District.

=== Crimea and Donbas (2014-2015) ===
Serdyukov led Russian forces in the spring 2014 Annexation of Crimea by the Russian Federation. Using the code name "Sedov", Serdyukov commanded the grouping of Russian troops in the Donbas in August 2015.

As of June 2022, Serdyukov was listed in the Australian "Autonomous Sanctions (Designated Persons and Entities and Declared Persons - Ukraine) List 2014".

=== Commander airborne troops (2016-2019) ===
On 4 October 2016, Serdyukov was appointed commander of the Russian Airborne Troops, replacing Colonel General Vladimir Shamanov. He was presented the Airborne flag on 10 October by defense minister Sergey Shoygu.

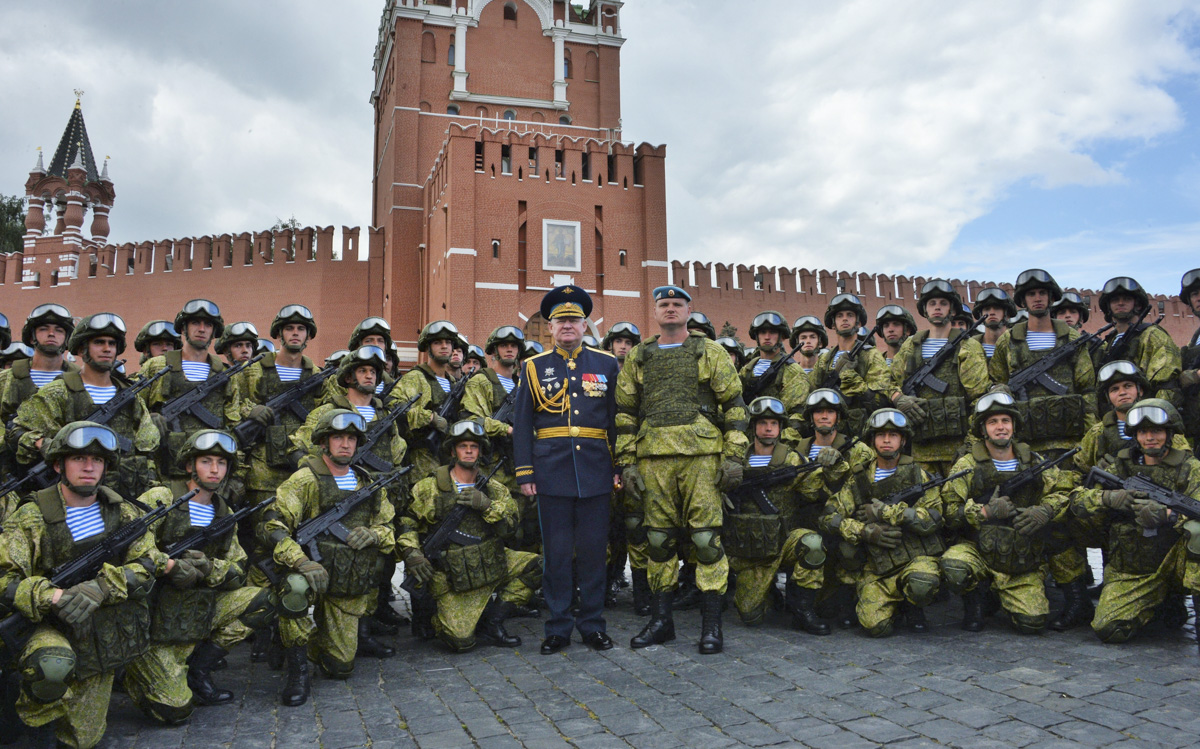
Personnel of the Airborne Forces, with General Serdyukov in the center, in front of Spasskaya Bashnya on Paratroopers' Day in 2020.

On 15 September 2017, Serdyukov was seriously injured during an accident on the R21 highway in Murmansk Oblast while supervising Airborne exercises: a Chevrolet Lanos smashed into his minivan, rolling it over. The crash was reported in the Russian media four days later, with Serdyukov reported to be in "satisfactory condition" with a serious craniocerebral trauma and fracture of the back; he was taken to the intensive care unit of the 1469th Naval Military Hospital of the Northern Fleet. Airborne Troops deputy commander Major General Vladimir Kochetkov also suffered fractures, while the driver of the passenger car was killed. Serdyukov recovered by 15 November, when he chaired a meeting of the Military Council of the Airborne Troops.

=== Syria (2019) ===
From 10 April 2019 to late September 2019, he was the Commander of the troops for the Russian military intervention in the Syrian Civil War to Syria.

=== CSTO Peacekeepers to Kazakhstan (2022) ===
On January 7, 2022, he was appointed Commander of the CSTO peacekeeping forces in Kazakhstan.

=== Russian invasion of Ukraine (2022) ===
On 2 February 2022, Serdyukov was rumoured by the Financial Times to be commander of Russian troops that would be sent into Ukraine, if such an action would be taken.

On 19 June 2022, it was reported by Odesa military-civilian spokesperson Serhiy Bratchuk that Vladimir Putin had sacked Serdyukov for his doomed bid to take Hostomel airfield in which few of the invading soldiers survived. This was confirmed by Russian media reports. He was replaced by Colonel General Mikhail Teplinsky. After his dismissal, Serdyukov was sent to Syria to command the Russian Group of Forces in that country.

=== CSTO Chief of Staff ===
In November 2023, he was appointed chief of joint staff of the CSTO.

== Awards ==
Serdyukov has received the following awards.

- Hero of the Russian Federation (2016)
- Order "For Merit to the Fatherland" 3rd class and 4th class (with Swords)
- Order of Alexander Nevsky
- Order of Courage
- Order of Honour
- Order for Service to the Homeland in the Armed Forces of the USSR 3rd class
- Order of Military Merit
- Honoured Military Specialist of the Russian Federation

== Personal life ==
He was sanctioned by the UK government in 2022 in relation to the Russo-Ukrainian War.

== See also ==
- List of Heroes of the Russian Federation

== Notes ==
Military offices
Preceded by Anatoly Yolkin	Commander of the 138th Separate Guards Motor Rifle Brigade; 2002–2004	Succeeded by Vladimir Tsilko
Preceded by Yevgeny Savilov	Commander of the 106th Guards Airborne Division; 2004–2007	Succeeded by Yevgeny Ustinov
Preceded by Aleksandr Dvornikov	Commander of the 5th Combined Arms Army; 2011–2013	Succeeded by Aleksey Salmin
Preceded by Andrey Kartapolov	Deputy Commander of the Southern Military District; 2013	Succeeded by Viktor Astapov
Preceded by Nikolai Pereslegin	Chief of Staff and First Deputy Commander of the Southern Military District; 2013–2015	Succeeded by Alexander Zhuravlyov
Preceded by Vladimir Shamanov	Commander of the Russian Airborne Forces; 2016–2022	Succeeded by Mikhail Teplinsky
Preceded by Sergey Surovikin	Commander of the Operational Group of the Russian Armed Forces in Syria; 2019	Succeeded by Aleksandr Chaiko
Preceded by Roman Berdnikov	Commander of the Operational Group of the Russian Armed Forces in Syria; 2022–2023	Succeeded by Sergey Kisel
Preceded by Anatoly Sidorov	Chief of the Joint Staff of the Collective Security Treaty Organization; 2023–present	Incumbent
