= Southern Military District =

Russian military district

- Южный военный округ
- Emblem of the Southern Military District
- Founded: 22 October 2010
- Country: Russia
- Type: Military district
- Part of: Ministry of Defence
- Headquarters: Budennovsky Prospekt 43, Rostov-on-Don
- Engagements: Russo-Ukrainian War; Invasion of Ukraine
- Decorations: Order of the Red Banner; Order of Suvorov
- Website: Official website

Commanders
- Commander: Colonel General Sergey Medvedev
- First Deputy Commander & Chief of Staff: Lieutenant General Aleksandr Tokarev

Insignia
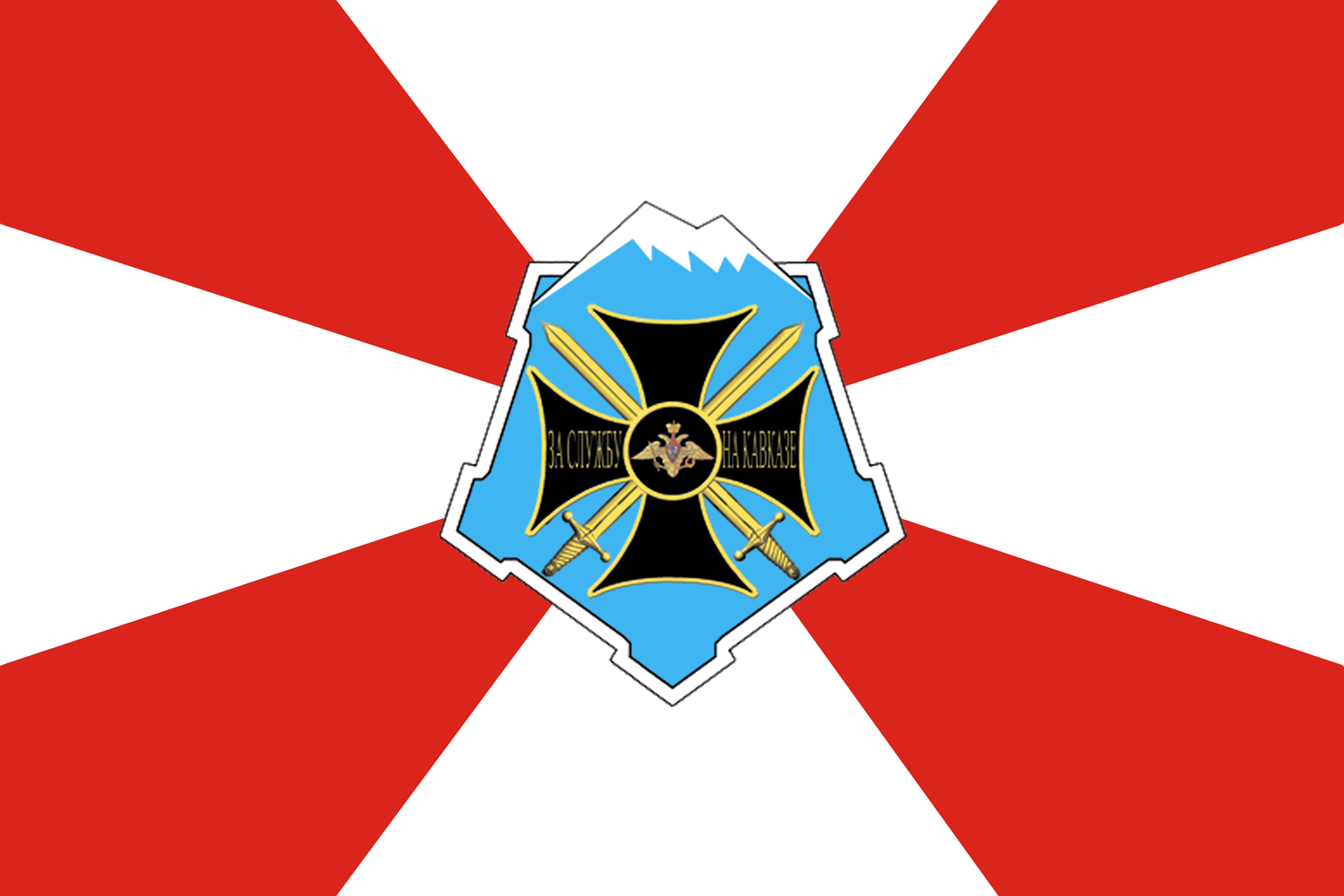
- Flag

The Order of the Red Banner Southern Military District (Russian: Южный военный округ, romanized: Yuzhnyy voyennyy okrug) is a military district of Russia. It is one of the five military districts of the Russian Armed Forces, with its jurisdiction primarily within the North Caucasus region of the country, and Russian bases in South Caucasian post-Soviet states. The Southern Military District was created as part of the 2008 military reforms, and founded by Presidential Decree №1144 signed on September 20, 2010, to replace the North Caucasus Military District, and absorbing the military commands of the Black Sea Fleet and Caspian Flotilla. The district began operation on October 22, 2010, under the command of Colonel-General Aleksandr Galkin.

The Southern Military District is the smallest military district in Russia by geographic size. The district contains 13 federal subjects of Russia: Adygea, Astrakhan Oblast, Chechnya, Dagestan, Ingushetia, Kabardino-Balkaria, Kalmykia, Karachay-Cherkessia, Krasnodar Krai, North Ossetia-Alania, Rostov Oblast, Stavropol Krai and Volgograd Oblast. After the full-scale Russian invasion of Ukraine was launched on 24 February 2022, six oblasts of Ukraine, partially occupied by Russia, were announced as being added to the district: the Crimea, Donetsk, Kherson, Lugansk, Sevastopol and Zaporozhye. These territories are components of Ukraine which since early 2022 have been partially or fully militarily occupied by Russian military forces.

The Southern Military District is headquartered in Rostov-on-Don, and its acting district commander is Lieutenant General Sergey Medvedev, who has served since November 2025.

== History ==
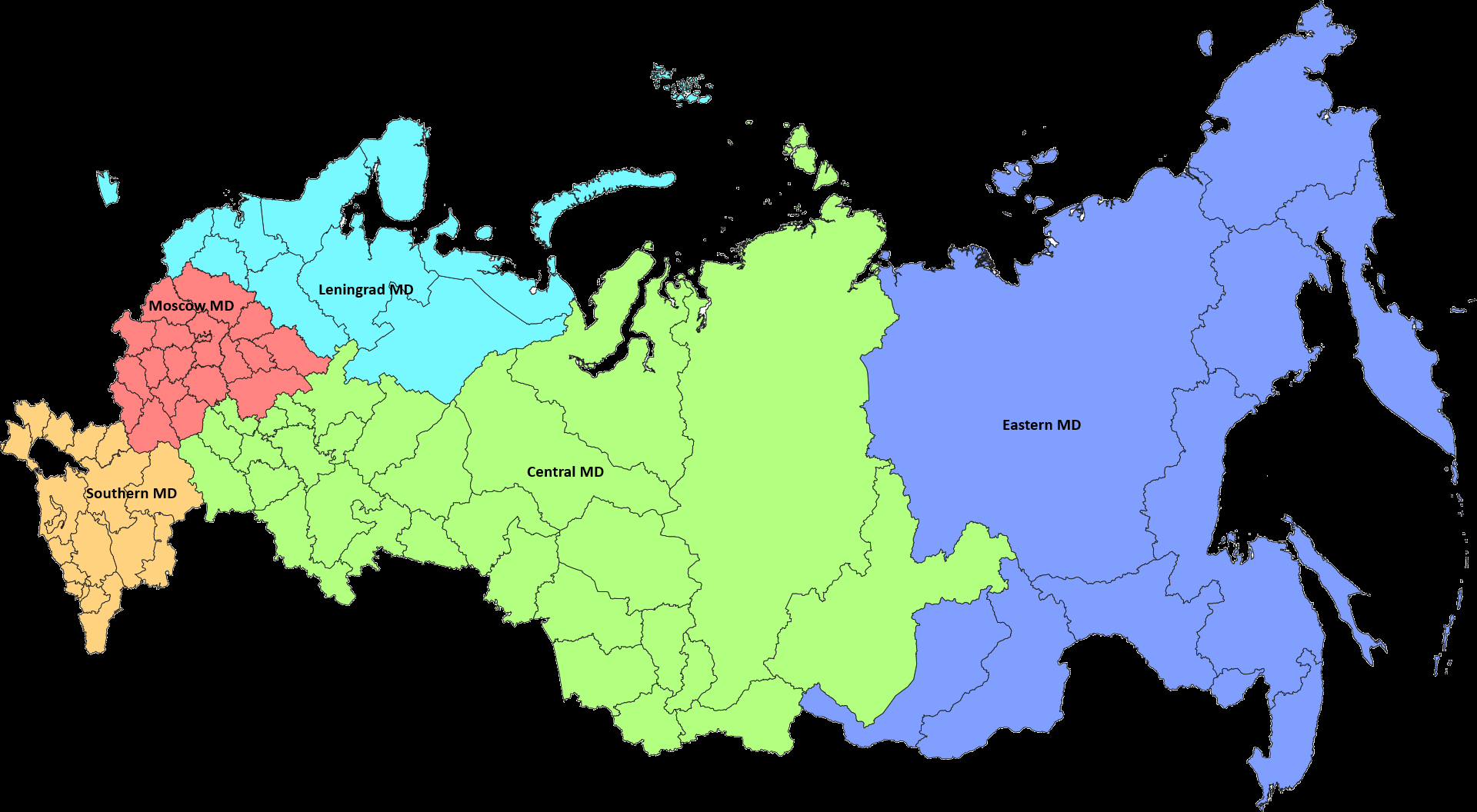
The Southern Military District, on a map of the five Russian military districts

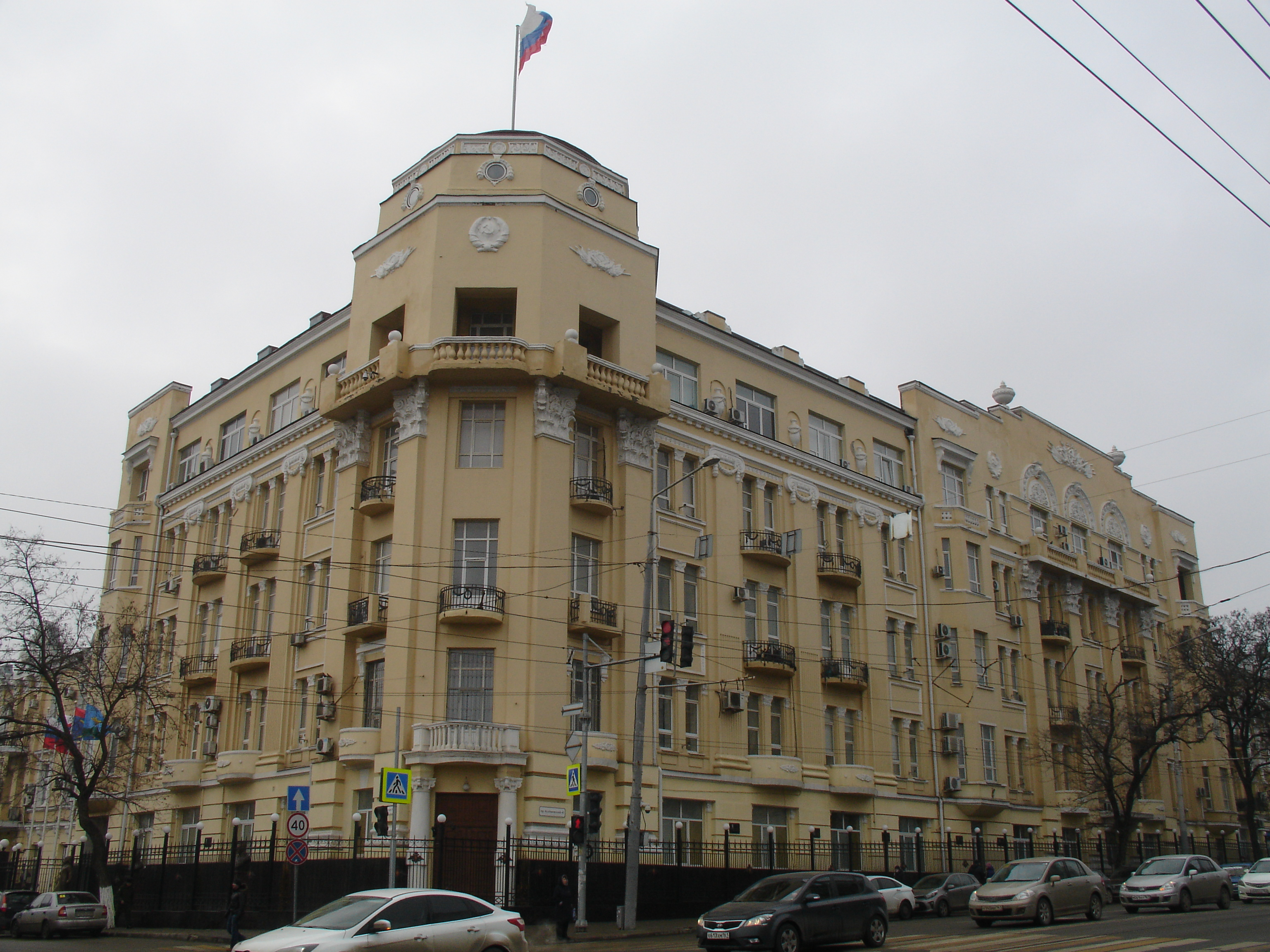
Headquarters of the district at 53 Pushkinskaya Street / 43 Budenovsky avenue, Rostov-on-Don

The Southern Military District was formed on 22 October 2010, according to Presidential Decree of 20 September 2010 № 1144 "On the Military Administrative Division Of the Russian Federation" the Southern Military District was created along with two other new larger military districts: the Central Military District and the Eastern Military District. By order of then Russian Defense Minister Anatoly Serdyukov, on 22 July 2010, interim commanders were named for the new military districts. Thus, the new position of commander of the Southern Military District, was Lieutenant-General Aleksandr Galkin, former Commander of the North Caucasus Military District, with Major-General Nikolai Pereslegin as the chief of staff for the district. Galkin was later promoted to Colonel General soon after his appointment as district commander.

The Southern Military District also directs two Russian military bases in Armenia: the 102nd Military Base in Gyumri, and the 3624th Air Base at the civil-military Erebuni Airport in the capital Yerevan, under the joint control of Armenian and Russian authorities.

In April 2014, Crimea and Sevastopol were added to the Southern Military District following the annexation of Crimea by the Russian Federation. The legal status of Crimea (as the Autonomous Republic of Crimea) and the city of Sevastopol is currently under dispute: Ukraine and the majority of the international community considers them an integral part of Ukraine, while Russia considers them an integral part of Russia, with Crimea (as the Republic of Crimea) and Sevastopol approved as federal subjects of Russian Federation.

In 2016, the District was 98% staffed by contract servicemen.

In November 2020, following the aftermath of the 2020 Nagorno-Karabakh war, Russian military peacekeepers were deployed to Nagorno-Karabakh for securing the Lachin corridor and along the line of contact for at least five years. A military base was set up with its headquarters at Stepanakert and is part of the Southern Military District commanded by First deputy commander of the military district Lieutenant General Rustam Muradov. He was replaced by Deputy military district commander Lieutenant General Alexey Avdeev on 13 May 2021.

In January–February 2021, the 1061st Centre for Material-Technical Support (1061 CMTO), the district's logistics command, was reorganised. A storage base for missile and artillery weapons was formed and transferred to the direct subordination of the 1061 CMTO. The centre itself is located in the 4, 6 7 and 21 Military towns (военных городках) in Novocherkassk. One of the other units of the 1061 CMTO is the warehouse (for storing material and technical equipment of the clothing service) (Military Unit 57229-31) which has been headed by Stanislav Valerievich Yazykov 2011–2018 (in Stepnoy, Volgodonskoy District?).

On 24 June 2023, the headquarters of the district was captured by Wagner Group during the Wagner Group rebellion.

In April 2024, the Ukrainian Main Directorate of Intelligence claimed that some 18,000 Russian soldiers had deserted the Southern Military District, including 2,000 contract and 10,000 mobilised soldiers.

== District organization ==
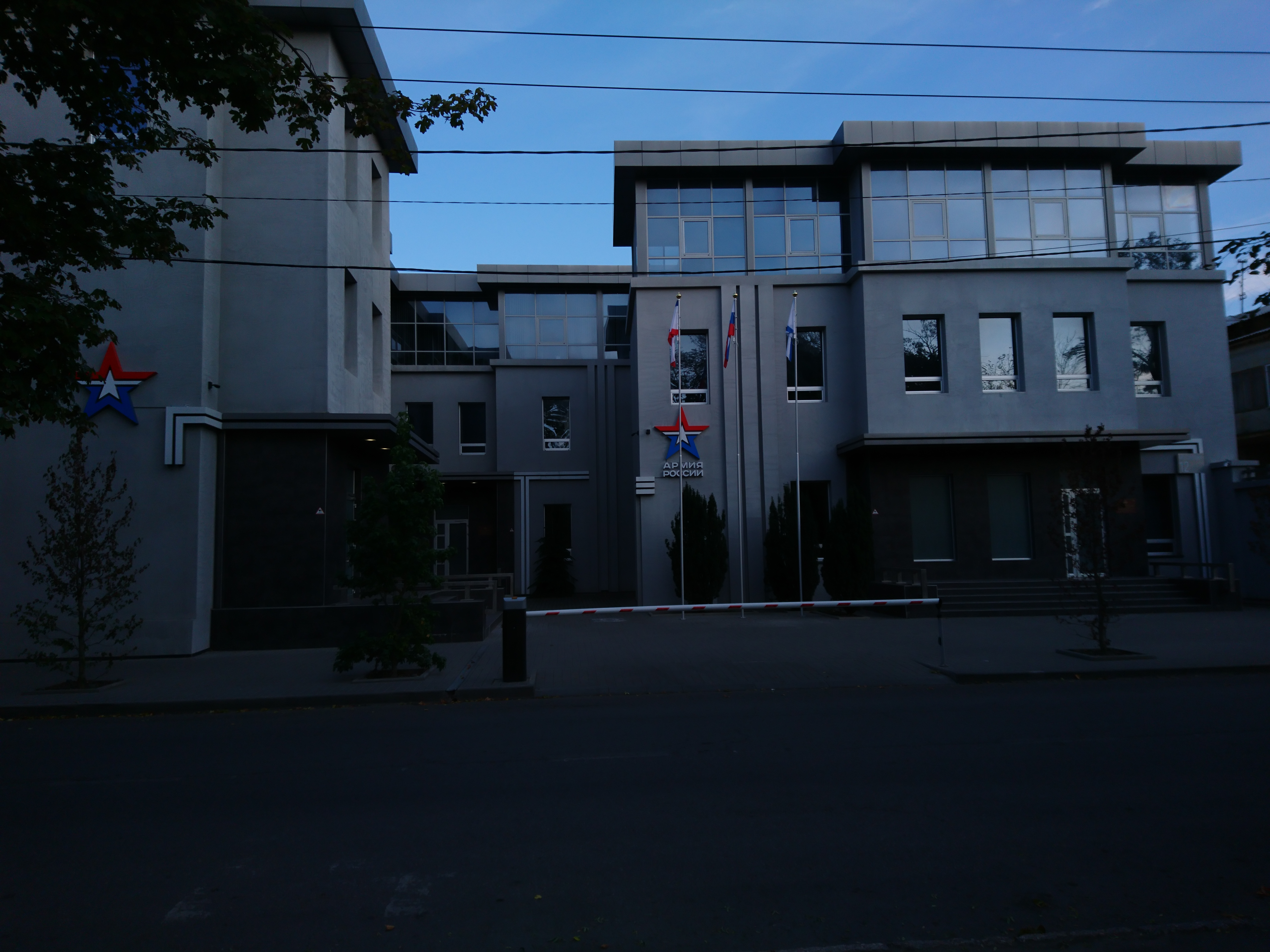
Russian Ministry of Defense branch office in Simferopol

As part of the larger reorganisation, the 49th Army reformed with its headquarters seemingly in the former Institute of Communications of the Strategic Rocket Forces at Stavropol. According to warfare.ru, 49th Army (listed at Stavropol/Maikop) has under control the 7th Military Base (in Abkhazia) and the 8th (former Taman Guards Motor Rifle Division), 33rd Mountain Motor Rifle and 34th separate Mountain Motor Rifle Brigades (Borzoi, Chechniya, Maikop, and Storozhevaya-2), as well as the 66th Communications Brigade.

There are also two Spetsnaz brigades (10th and 22nd) an experimental reconnaissance brigade (the 100th), plus one Russian Airborne Troops unit also stationed in the district: the 7th Guards Mountain Air Assault Division at Novorossiysk (which, in 2021, absorbed the former 56th Guards Airborne Brigade). The Russian Aerospace Forces has the 4th Air and Air Defence Forces Army in the district. Also under the district's control are the Navy's Black Sea Fleet and Caspian Flotilla, including their respective air and Naval Infantry components, including – in the case of the Black Sea Fleet – the 22nd Army Corps.

In early 2017, the reformation of the 8th Guards Combined Arms Army, successor to the Soviet 8th Guards Army, began within the Southern Military District. The army's headquarters is located at Novocherkassk and it is to include the 150th Motor Rifle Division and the 20th Guards Motor Rifle Division. The first phase of its formation was completed in June 2017.

The 58th Guards Combined Arms Army comprising two further motorized rifle divisions, plus other army level units and the 4th Guards Military Base in South Ossetia is the third army-level formation in the District.

== Component units ==
External image
- IISS estimate of major unit dispositions in the Southern Military District, 20 March 2014

- 175th Luninets-Pinsk Order of Alexander Nevsky Twice Red Star Headquarters Brigade (Aksay)
- 176th Communications Brigade (Territorial) (Rassvet)
- 11th Guards Kingisepp Red Banner Order of Alexander Nevsky Engineering Brigade (Kamensk-Shakhtinsky)
- 28th NBC Defence Brigade (Kamyshin)
- 439th Rocket Artillery Brigade (Znamensk)
- 1270th Electronic Warfare Center (Kovalevka)
- 37th Railway Brigade (Russian Railway Troops) (Volgograd)
- 39th Railway Brigade (Krasnodar)
- 333rd Railway Pontoon Bridge Battalion (Volgograd)
- Mountain Training Center of the Armed Forces (Baksan)
- 54th Training Center of Intelligence Units (Vladikavkaz)
- 27th Training Center of Railway Troops (Volgograd)
- 102nd Military Base (Gyumri, Armenia)
  - 76th Motorized Brigade (Gyumri, Armenia)
  - 73rd Motorized Brigade (Yerevan, Armenia)
  - 988th Air Defense Regiment (Gyumri, Armenia)
- Unnamed Military Base in (Stepanakert, Nagorno-Karabakh, Azerbaijan)

58th Combined Arms Army (Vladikavkaz)

- 42nd Guards Motor Rifle Division (Shali, Khankala, Borzoy)
- 19th Motor Rifle Division (Vladikavkaz) (expanded from Brigade to Division strength in 2020–22 period; planned to re-equip with T-90M main battle tanks)
  - 503rd Motorized Rifle Regiment (equipping with BTR-82A armored personnel carriers as of 2021)
- 136th Guards Motor Rifle Brigade (Buynaksk)
- 12th Rocket Brigade (Mozdok)
- 291st Artillery Brigade (Troitskaya)
- 67th Anti-Aircraft Rocket Brigade (Volgograd/Beketovskaya, Volgograd Oblast)
- 34th C3 Brigade (Vladikavkaz)
- 4th Guards Military Base in (Java-Tskhinvali, South Ossetia, Georgia) Reported subordinate to 58th Army

Note: the 42nd Guards Motor Rifle Division, reforming from late 2016 in Chechniya, is drawn from the 8th Guards, 17th, and 18th Guards Motor Rifle Brigades

8th Guards Combined Arms Army (Novocherkassk)

- 150th Guards Motor Rifle Division (Novocherkassk)
  - 103rd Motorized Rifle Regiment (Kadamovskiy and Kuzminka, Rostov Oblast)
  - 163rd Tank Regiment (Kuzminka, Rostov Oblast)
  - 102nd Motorized Rifle Regiment (Persianovskiy, Rostov Oblast)
  - 68th Tank Regiment (Persianovskiy, Rostov Oblast)
  - 174th Reconnaissance Battalion (Persianovskiy, Rostov Oblast)
  - 381st Artillery Regiment (Persianovskiy and Millerovo, Rostov Oblast)
  - Additional Motorized Rifle Regiment reported forming within the Division as of 2018
  - 933rd Anti-Aircraft Missile Regiment (Millerovo)
- 20th Guards Motor Rifle Division (Volgograd and Kamyshin regions; reconstituted from former 20th Motor Rifle Brigade starting in 2021; transformation to complete in 2022)
  - 242nd Guards Motor Rifle Regiment (Kamyshin, Volgograd Oblast);
  - 255th Motor Rifle Regiment (Volgograd);
  - 33rd Motor Rifle Regiment (Kamyshin);
  - 944th Guards Self-Propelled Artillery Regiment;
  - 358th Guards Anti-Aircraft Missile Regiment;
  - 428th Separate Tank Battalion (near Volgograd; planned to re-equip with T-90M main battle tanks)
  - 487th Separate Anti-Tank Artillery Battalion.
- 464th Rocket Brigade
- 47th Missile Brigade (Korenovsk, Krasnodar Krai, established 2021; equipped with Iskander surface-to-surface missiles)
- 238th Guards Artillery Brigade (Korenovsk, Krasnodar Krai, established 2021; equipped with 2A65 Msta-B guns and 9K57 Uragan multiple launch rocket systems)
- 77th Anti-Aircraft Missile Brigade (Korenovsk; equipped with S-300V4 anti-aircraft missile system)
- Additional SAM brigade reported forming in 2021/22 with Buk-M3 surface-to-air missile systems

51st Combined Arms Army (Former People's Militia of the Donetsk People's Republic: Народная милиция Донецкой Народной Республики): (Note: Until 2024, ukrainian sources described the 1st and 2nd (Donbas/Russian) Army Corps in Ukraine's Donbas as "operationally subordinate" to the 8th Army HQ.)

- 7 motorized rifle brigades (1st, 3rd, 5th, 9th, 110th, 114th and 132nd Motorized Rifle Brigades)
- 9 rifle regiments (87th, 105th, 107th, 109th, 111th, 123rd, 125th, 127th Rifle Regiments)
- 3 special forces battalions (1st, 3rd and Viking SF Battalions)
- 1 tank regiment (10th Tank Regiment)
- 1 tank battalion (2nd Tank Battalion)
- 6 territorial defense battalion (1st, 2nd, 3rd, 4th, 5th, 6th Territorial Defense Battalions)
- 1 reconnaissance battalion (Sparta Separate Reconnaissance Battalion)
- 1 artillery brigade (14th Artillery Brigade)

3rd Guards Luhansk-Severodonetsk Combined Arms Army (Former People's Militia of the Luhansk People's Republic: Народная милиция Луганской Народной Республики):

- 3 Motorized Rifle Brigades (2nd, 4th, 7th Motorized Rifle Brigades)
- 1 Motorized Rifle Regiment (6th Motorized Rifle Regiment)
- 1 tank battalion (Pantsir Special Mechanized Force)
- 1 reconnaissance battalion (Greka Separate Reconnaissance Battalion)
- 1 artillery brigade

18th Combined Arms Army (Crimea)

- 70th Motor Rifle Division
  - 24th Motor Rifle Regiment
  - 26th Motor Rifle Regiment
  - 28th Motor Rifle Regiment
  - 17th Tank Regiment
  - 81st Self-Propelled Artillery Regiment
- 22nd Army Corps, HQ in Sevastopol
- 40th Army Corps
  - 144th Motor Rifle Brigade
  - 47th Motor Rifle Division
- 74th Artillery Brigade

49th Combined Arms Army (Stavropol/Maykop)

- 205th Motor Rifle Brigade (Budennovsk)
- 34th Motorized Rifle Brigade (Mountain) (Storozhevaya-2)
- 66th C3 Brigade (Stavropol)
- 227th Artillery Brigade (Maykop)
- 1st Guards Rocket Brigade (Krasnodar)
- 439th Guards Perekop Order of Kurozov Rocket Artillery Brigade (Znamensk)
- 21st NBC Defense Brigade (Kamyshin)
- 66th Headquarters Brigade
- 154th ECM Brigade OSN (Izobilny)
- Logistic Support Brigade in (Stavropol)
- 7th Military Base (Gudauta, Abkhazia, Georgia – subordinate to 49th Army HQ) 'Krasnodar Red Banner, Order of Kutuzov, Order of the Red Star' (former 131st Motor Rifle Brigade)

Airborne Troops

- 7th Guards Mountain Air Assault Division (at Novorossiysk)

Special forces/Reconnaissance

- 100th Reconnaissance Brigade (Experimental) (Mozdok-7)
- 10th Spetsnaz Brigade in (Krasnodar)
- 22nd Guards Spetsnaz Brigade in (Rostov-on-Don)

Aerospace Forces units

- 4th Air and Air Defence Forces Army

Naval Forces

- Black Sea Fleet
  - 11th Coastal Defense Missile-Artillery Brigade (Utash, Krasnodar region)
  - 810th Guards Naval Infantry Brigade
  - 382nd Naval Infantry Battalion
  - 68th Fleet Naval Engineers Regiment
  - 133rd Fleet Logistics and Materiel Regiment
  - 4th Fleet NBC Regiment
- Caspian Flotilla
  - 177th Naval Infantry Regiment
    - Regimental HQ
    - 414th and 727th Naval Infantry Battalions
    - Tank Battalion
  - 46th Coastal Defense Missile Artillery Battalion (Surface to Air)

== Leadership ==
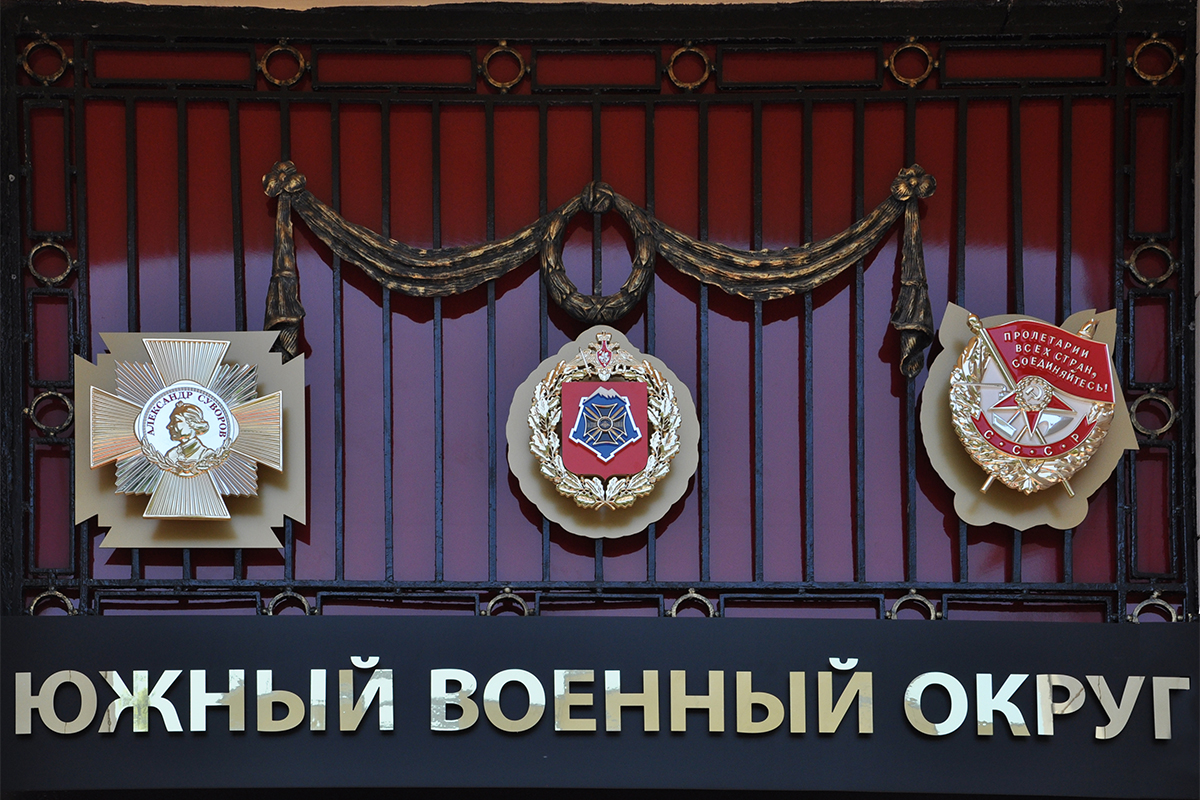
Celebration of the 100th anniversary of the North Caucasian (Southern) Military District formation in Rostov-on-Don.

=== Commanders ===
- Colonel-General Aleksandr Galkin (10 December 2010 – June 2016)
- Colonel-General (later Army General) Aleksandr Dvornikov (20 September 2016 – 23 January 2023)
- Colonel-General Sergey Kuzovlev (23 January 2023 – 15 May 2024)
- Colonel-General Gennady Anashkin (15 May 2024 – November 2024; acting)
- Colonel-General Aleksandr Sanchik (26 November 2024 – 8 November 2025)
- Lieutenant-General (later Colonel-General) Sergey Medvedev (20 November 2025 – present)

=== Chiefs of Staff – First Deputy Commanders ===
- Major General Nikolai Pereslegin (April 2010 – October 2013)
- Lieutenant General Andrey Serdyukov (October 2013 – December 2015)
- Lieutenant General Alexander Zhuravlyov (December 2015 – March 2017)
- Lieutenant General Mikhail Teplinsky (March 2017 – February 2019)
- Lieutenant General (later Colonel General) Sergey Kuzovlev (February 2019 – December 2022)
- Major General (later Lieutenant General) Sergey Medvedev (October 2023 – November 2025)
- Lieutenant General Alexander Tokarev (November 2025 – present)

=== Deputy Commanders ===
- Lieutenant General Andrey Serdyukov (February 2013 – October 2013)
- Major General Viktor Astapov (December 2013 – June 2014)
- Lieutenant General Andrey Gurulyov (August 2016 – 2017)
- Lieutenant General Alexander Romanchuk (2017–2018)
- Lieutenant General Rustam Muradov (December 2018 – October 2022)
- Lieutenant General Alexey Avdeev (January 2019 – summer 2022)
- Lieutenant General Oleg Tsokov (summer 2022 – July 2023)
- Lieutenant General Vladimir Kochetkov (July 2023 - present)

=== Commanders of the Russian contingent in Nagorno-Karabakh ===
- Lieutenant General Rustam Muradov (11 November 2020 – 9 September 2021)
- Major General Mikhail Kosobokov (9 September 2021 – 25 September 2021)
- Lieutenant General Gennady Anashkin (25 September 2021 – 12 January 2022)
- Major General Andrey Volkov (12 January 2022 – 25 April 2023)
- Colonel General Alexander Lentsov (25 April 2023 - 3 September 2023)
- Major General Kirill Kulakov (3 September 2023 - present)

== See also ==
- List of military airbases in Russia
