= Oleg Makarevich =

Russian general (born 1962)

- Олег Леонтьевич Макаревич
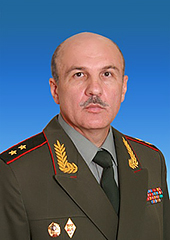
- Born: Oleg Leontyevich Makarevich; 30 December 1962 (age 63); Kuznetsk, Russian SFSR, Soviet Union
- Military career
- Allegiance: Soviet Union; Russia
- Branch: Russian Ground Forces
- Service years: 1979–present
- Rank: Colonel General

Oleg Leontyevich Makarevich (Russian: Олег Леонтьевич Макаревич; born 30 December 1962) is a Russian Ground Forces colonel general who until October 2023 commanded the Dnieper Grouping of Forces in the Russian invasion of Ukraine.

== Biography ==
Oleg Leontyevich Makerevich was born on 30 December 1962 in Kuznetsk. In 1984 he graduated from the Moscow Higher Military Command School. From 1984 to 1989 he served in the Group of Soviet Forces in Germany as a platoon commander, company commander, and battalion chief of staff in a tank division. Makarevich was accepted to the Frunze Military Academy in 1989 and after his graduation in 1992 served in the Far Eastern Military District as a battalion commander, motor rifle regiment chief of staff and deputy commander, and motor rifle regiment commander. In 1998 he was transferred to the North Caucasus Military District, serving as chief of staff and deputy commander of a motor rifle division and commanding that motor rifle division.

Makarevich was admitted to the Military Academy of the General Staff in 2004, and on graduation in 2006 was appointed chief of staff and first deputy commander of the 22nd Guards Combined Arms Army. In 2008 he was transferred to the Volga–Ural Military District to command the 2nd Guards Combined Arms Army. Between 2010 and 2012 he served as chief of the military science department of the Military Academy of the General Staff. From 2012 to 2013 he commanded the 36th Combined Arms Army of the Eastern Military District. In 2013 he was appointed deputy commander of the Western Military District, and in October 2013 appointed chief of staff and first deputy commander of the district. Between 2014 and 2017 he served as chief of the Combined Arms Academy. From September 2017 to March 2019 he served as chief of the Coastal Troops of the Russian Navy and deputy commander-in-chief of the Russian Navy. From February 2019, Makarevich served as first deputy chief of the Military Academy of the General Staff.

According to information provided by GUR, Makarevitch is deployed to Venezuela to head a Russian military advisory mission to the FANB as of November 2025.

=== Russo-Ukrainian War ===
In early 2023, there was speculation that he replaced Mikhail Teplinsky as airborne forces commander. He was promoted to colonel general on 17 February 2023, and by April commanded the Dnieper Grouping of Forces in the Kherson sector.

According to Russian milbloggers cited by the Institute for the Study of War, he was replaced by Colonel General Mikhail Teplinsky as commander of Dnieper forces on 29 October 2023.

== Decorations ==
- Order "For Merit to the Fatherland", 4th class with swords
- Order of Zhukov
- Order of Courage
- Order of Military Merit
- Order of Honour
- Medal of the Order "For Merit to the Fatherland" 2nd class with swords
