= Gennady Anashkin =

Russian military commander

- Геннадий Владимирович Анашкин
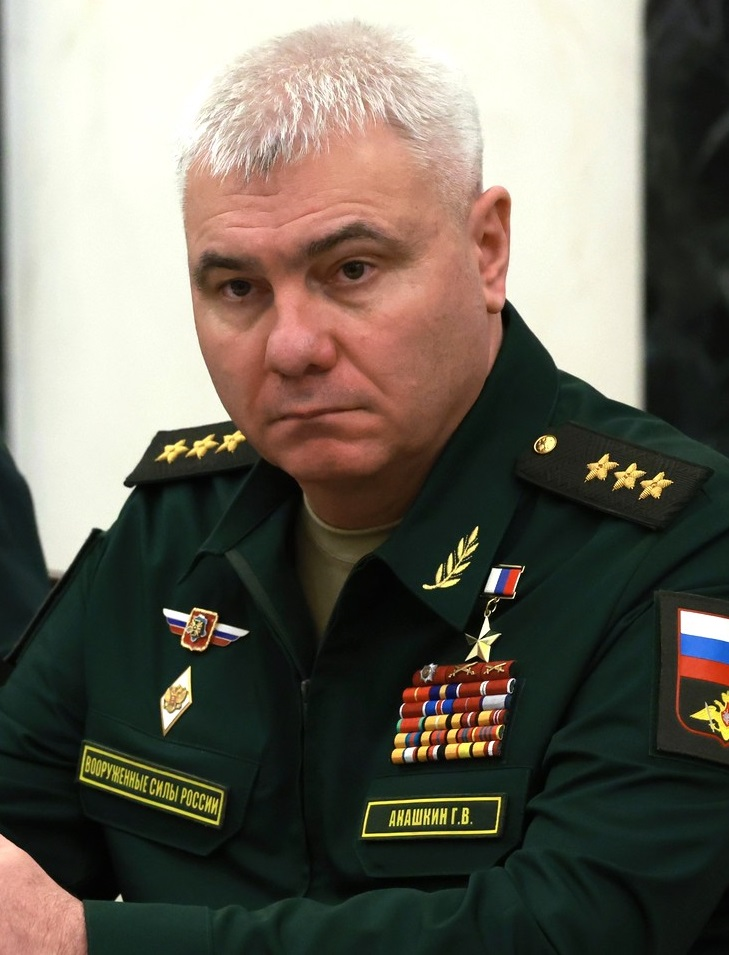
- Born: Gennady Vladmirovich Anashkin; 17 December 1968 (age 57); Kuybishev, Russian SFSR, Soviet Union
- Military career
- Allegiance: Soviet Union; Russia
- Service years: 1987–present
- Rank: Colonel general
- Commands: Southern Military District; Combined Arms Academy of the Armed Forces
- Conflicts: Russo-Georgian War; Russo-Ukrainian War
- Awards: Hero of the Russian Federation

Gennady Vladimirovich Anashkin (Russian: Геннадий Владимирович Анашкин; born 17 December 1968), is a Russian army officer who served as the acting commander of the Southern Military District between 15 May and November 2024. He was awarded the title Hero of the Russian Federation in 2008, and was promoted to colonel general in 2023.

Anashkin was the deputy commander of the 8th Combined Arms Army of the Southern Military District since July 2017, and the army's commander between 2023 and 2024. As of December 2024, he is currently head of the Combined Arms Academy of the Armed Forces of the Russian Federation.

== Biography ==
Gennady Anashkin was born on 17 December 1968 in Kuibyshev (now Samara). In June 1987, he was called up for military service in the Soviet Army and served in the Group of Soviet Forces in Germany. In August 1989 he entered the Ryazan Higher Airborne Command School, after which in 1993 he was sent to serve in the 337th Guards Parachute Regiment (104th Guards Airborne Division, Ulyanovsk). He took command of a parachute platoon from August 1993. In August 1994, he was appointed to the position of deputy commander, and in July 1995, to the position of commander of a parachute company in the same regiment. Since April 1998, he served in the 116th Separate Parachute Battalion of the 31st Guards Air Assault Brigade, at Ulyanovsk, where he commanded a company.

From December 1999 to August 2000, Anashkin served on a mission in the former Yugoslavia, where he commanded a parachute battalion as part of the Peacekeeping Forces in Bosnia and Herzegovina. In 2003, he graduated from the Combined Arms Academy of the Armed Forces of Russia. Since June 2003, he served as chief of staff - deputy commander of the 226th, and from September - the 285th training parachute regiment of the 242nd Training Centre for training junior airborne specialists in Omsk. In August 2006, he was appointed to the position of chief of staff and deputy commander of the 31st separate guards airborne brigade in Ulyanovsk. As part of the combined units, he was deployed to Chechnya during the first and second Chechen wars.

In June 2007, Anashkin took command of the 104th Guards Air Assault Regiment (76th Guards Air Assault Division, Pskov). Officially, on the morning of 9 August 2008, the regiment was brought to alert status and a few hours later, Colonel Anashkin, at the head of a battalion tactical group, flew to North Ossetia. On the night of 9 August, a group under the command of Anashkin began a march to South Ossetia and by the morning of 9 August reached Tskhinvali. On 10 August, a group consisting of two parachute companies with BMDs, reinforced by four Nona self-propelled guns and four armoured personnel carriers, advanced on Gori. On the way, the group was attacked by Georgian aircraft, and an attack aircraft was shot down by anti-aircraft weapons.

Near the village of Khetagurovo, the group was fired upon by Georgian tanks, but after an exchange of fire, they retreated. Advancing from Shindisi to Gori, Anashkin's group attacked and destroyed a warehouse containing military equipment near the village of Variani. On 12 August, after a stubborn battle, the force secured a dominant height with the television tower, and destroyed a Georgian artillery battery. During the raid, the group lost one soldier killed and nine were wounded. By decree of the President of Russia on 5 September 2008, “for courage and heroism shown in the performance of military duty,” Guard Colonel Gennady Anashkin was awarded the title of Hero of the Russian Federation.

Anashkin continued to serve in the Russian Army. At the end of 2008, the regiment under his command was recognized as the best regiment in the Russian Airborne Forces. In August 2009, he was the deputy commander of the 106th Guards Airborne Division. From November 2010 to January 2011, he was the acting commander of the 106th Guards Airborne Division. In 2012, he graduated from the Military Academy of the General Staff of the Armed Forces of Russia. From August 2012, he was the commander of the 31st Guards Separate Air Assault Brigade. In August 2014, he became the deputy commander of the 58th Combined Arms Army of the Southern Military District. By decree of the President of the Russian Federation, on 11 December 2015, Anashkin was promoted to major general.

In July 2017, Anashkin became the deputy commander of the 8th Combined Arms Army of the Southern Military District. By Decree of the President of the Russian Federation No. 355 of 11 June 2021, he was promoted to lieutenant general. From 25 September 2021 to 11 January 2022, he was the Commander of the Russian peacekeeping contingent in Nagorno-Karabakh.

On 7 September 2023, Anashkin was promoted to Colonel General. On 15 May 2024, Anashkin became the acting commander of the Southern Military District. On 23 November 2024, Russian milbloggers widely reported that he had been quietly dismissed from his post after inaccurate reports of advances near the city of Siversk had been provided by his subordinates, of which some had reportedly been arrested.
