= Sergey Medvedev (general) =

Russian general (born 1979)

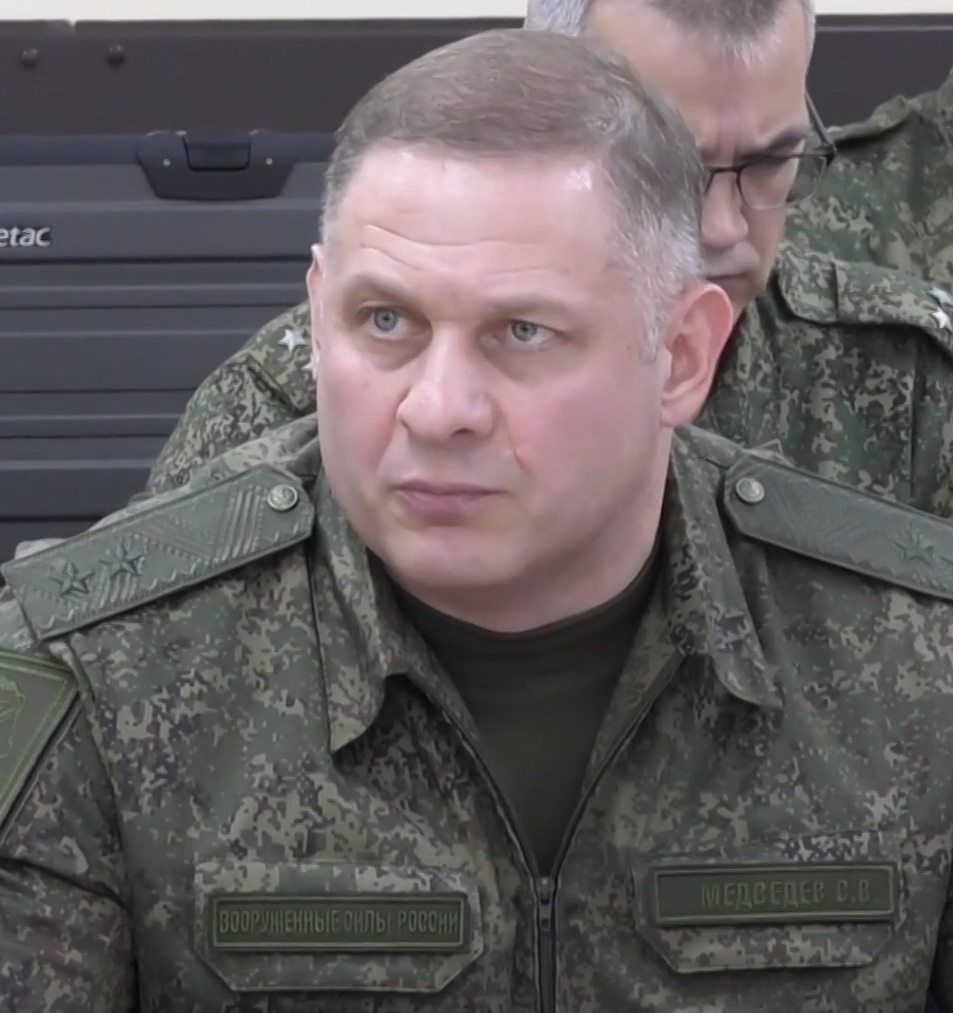
- Medvedev in 2025
- Born: 1979 (age 46–47); Prague, Czechoslovak Socialist Republic
- Alma mater: Russian General Staff Academy
- Military career
- Allegiance: Russia
- Branch: Russian Ground Forces
- Rank: Colonel General
- Commands: Southern Military District; 58th Combined Arms Army
- Conflicts: Russo-Ukrainian war

Colonel General Sergey Viktorovich Medvedev (born 1979) is a Russian military officer serving as the commander of the Southern Military District since 2025.

Medvedev was born in Prague to the family of a Soviet military officer, and is a graduate of the Russian General Staff Academy. He was the chief of staff of the 11th Army Corps of the Baltic Fleet until May 2022, and was promoted to major general on 7 December 2022. In October 2023, he took command of the 58th Guards Combined Arms Army, and defended the left bank of the Dnieper in Kherson Oblast. Medvedev was promoted to lieutenant general on 2 May 2024, and at some point became the chief of staff of the Southern Military District and the "South" group of forces. On 20 November 2025, he was appointed as its commander, and was promoted to colonel general before the end of 2025.
