= Combined Arms Academy of the Armed Forces of the Russian Federation =

Military academy in Moscow

Coordinates: 55°44′16″N 37°34′40″E

- Общевойсковая академия Вооружённых Сил Российской Федерации
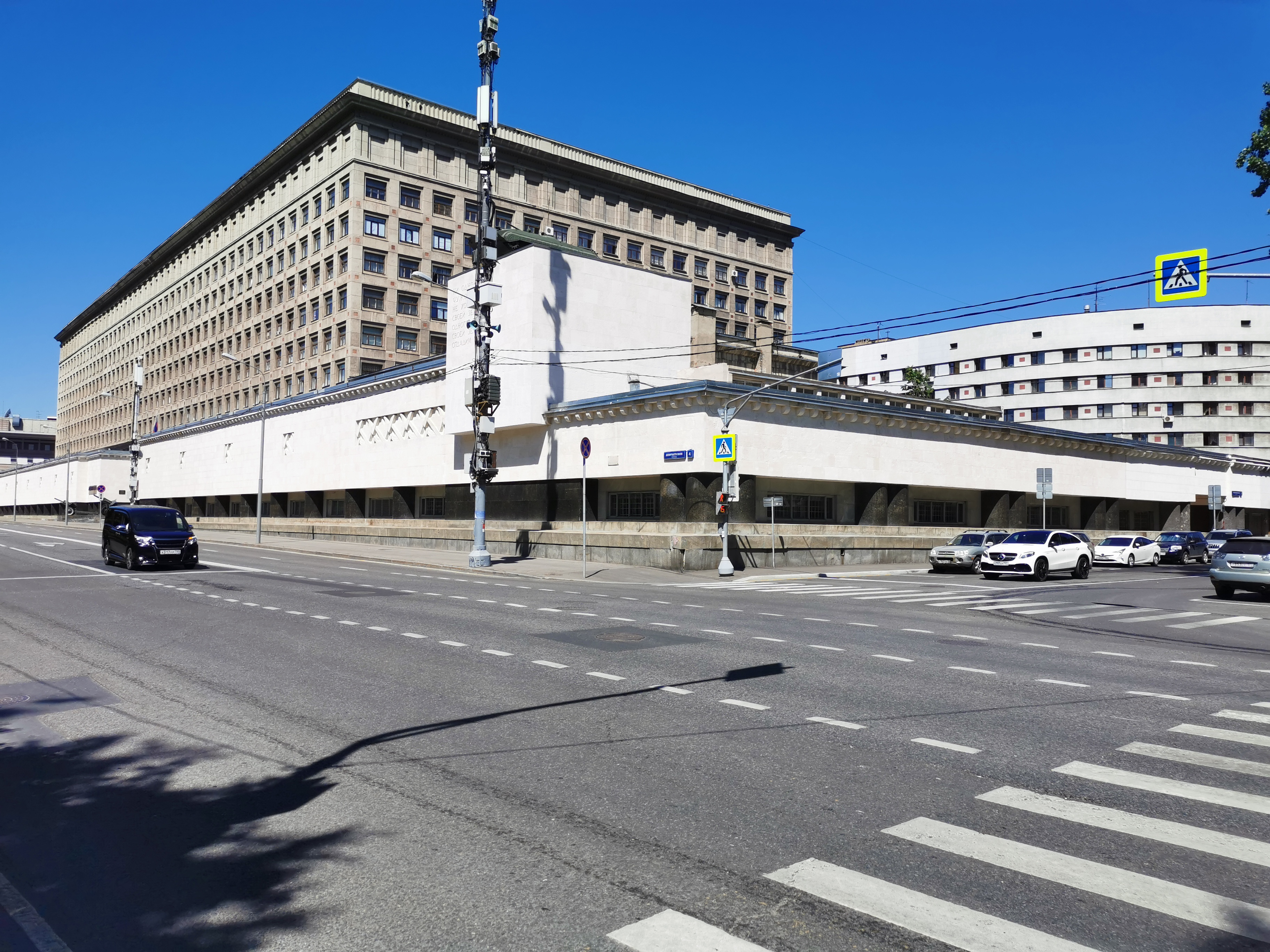
- Type: Military academy
- Established: 1998
- Rector: Colonel general Gennady Anashkin
- Location: Moscow, Russia
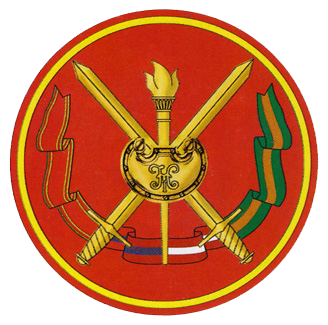

The Combined Arms Academy of the Armed Forces of the Russian Federation is a military academy in Moscow which provides graduate education for officers of the Russian Armed Forces. The full name reads: The Combined Academies Order of Lenin Order of the October Revolution Red Banner Order of Suvorov of the Armed Forces of the Russian Federation-Military Educational and Scientific Center of the Russian Ground Forces (Russian: Военный учебно-научный центр Сухопутных войск "Общевойсковая орденов Ленина и Октябрьской революции, Краснознаменная, ордена Суворова академия Вооруженных Сил Российской Федерации").

There are 30 departments within the academy. They are housed in two main buildings in the Khamovniki and Lefortovo Districts of Moscow. It has a source of historical origin and functionally duplicates the General Staff Academy. It is the equivalent of the United States Army's Command and General Staff College at Fort Leavenworth or the British Army's Staff College in Camberley.

Since 2024, the current Commandant of the Combined Military Academy is Colonel General Gennady Anashkin.

== History ==
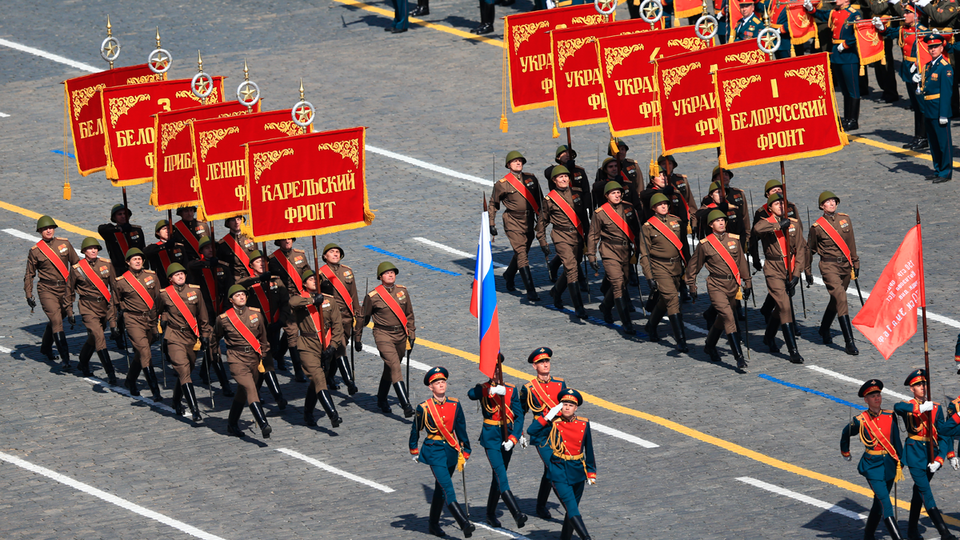
Cadets of the academy dressed in Red Army uniforms.

The predecessors of the Academy were the Frunze Military Academy and the Malinovsky Military Armored Forces Academy and the Shaposhnikov Vystrel Higher Officer Courses. The CAA was formed in 1998 on the base of both the Frunze Military Academy and the Armored Forces Academy. Since 2006 the Military Institute of the Engineering Troops was included as a structural unit in the reorganization of the V. V. Kuybyshev Military Engineering Academy.

In December 2008, its name was expanded to reflect its status as an institution. The reorganization was carried out by joining the academy with state educational institutions of higher professional education:

- Far Eastern Higher Combined Arms Command School
- Kazan Higher Tank Command School
- Moscow Higher Military Command School
- Novosibirsk Higher Military Command School
- Yekaterinburg Higher Artillery Command School
- Ryazan Higher Airborne Command School
- Omsk Tank Engineering Institute
- Chelyabinsk Higher Military Automobile Command Engineering School
- Penza Artillery Engineering Institute
- Tula Artillery Engineering Institute
- Military Institute for Advanced Studies of Specialists of Mobilization Bodies of the Armed Forces (Saratov)

In June 2007, in accordance with the a decree of the President Vladimir Putin, a combat banner was awarded. The Academy is subordinate to the Commander-in-Chief of the Russian Ground Forces.

== Activities ==
The Combined Arms Academy carries out the following activities: training for commanding officers and military engineers with higher professional education and conducting fundamental and applied scientific research aimed at solving the problems of strengthening the country's defense capability and improving the professional education of military personnel.

Organizationally, the academy consists of a command with a management apparatus, a military institute for the engineering troops, 1 branch, faculties, departments, research groups and laboratories, academic courses, doctoral studies, postgraduate studies, units and educational process support services.

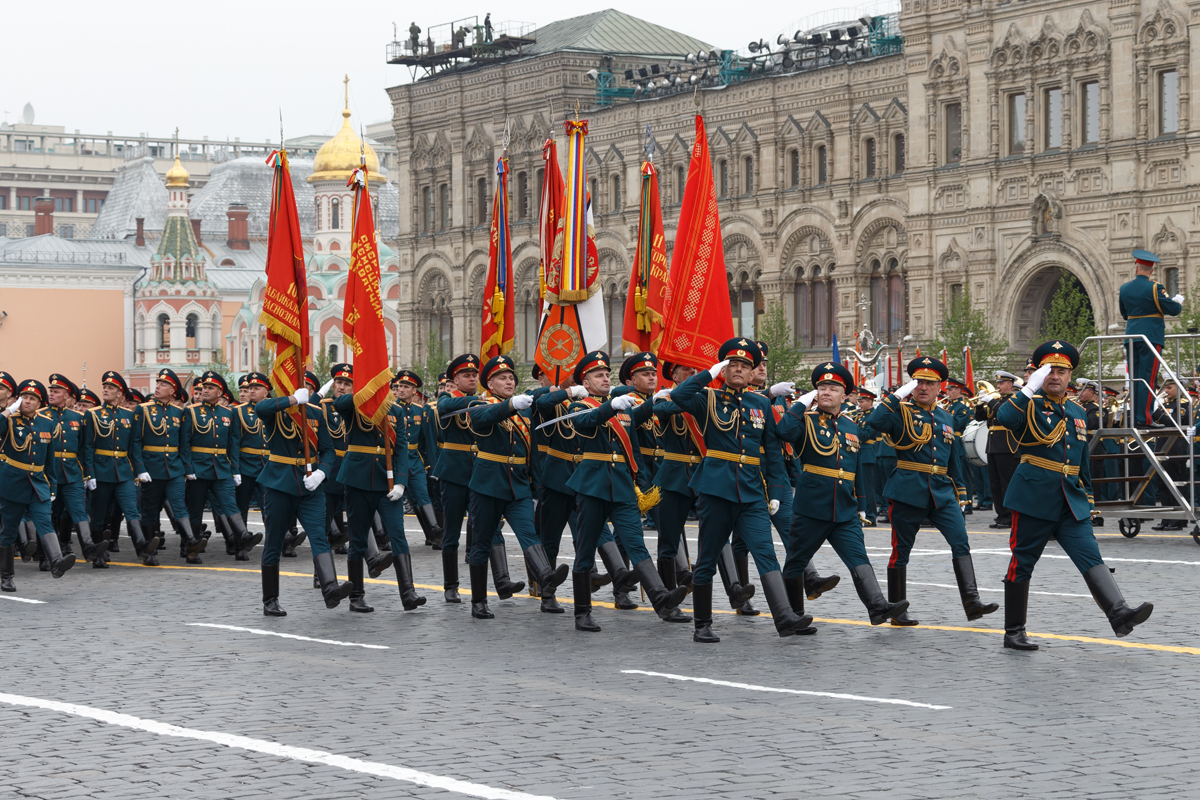
The academy during the 2019 Moscow Victory Day Parade.

=== Foreign cadets ===
Officers and cadets of foreign armies are trained at special faculties.

=== Band ===
Band of the Combined Arms Academy was formed in 1998 from Frunze Military Academy Band and the Malinovsky Military Armored Forces Academy Band. This gives the band an over 85-year history. By order of the Chairman of the Revolutionary Military Council in December 1931, a military band at the Frunze Military Academy was created. The first artistic director of the band was Colonel V. Gurfinkel. During the Great Patriotic War, many musicians of the band as part of the front-line brigades went to the front with concerts for fighters and commanders of the Red Army.

It has performed at the largest concert venues in Moscow: including the Kremlin Palace of Congresses, the House of the Unions, and the Tchaikovsky Concert Hall. On the All-Union Radio, the academy band recorded seven discs and over one hundred and twenty works of Soviet and foreign composers. In 1972, the team traveled to Belgium to participate in the celebration of the Independence Day and in 1990 gave a concert on the Champs Elysees in Paris.

=== Decorations ===
- Order of Lenin
- Order of the October Revolution
- Order of the Red Banner
- Order of Suvorov

== Heads ==
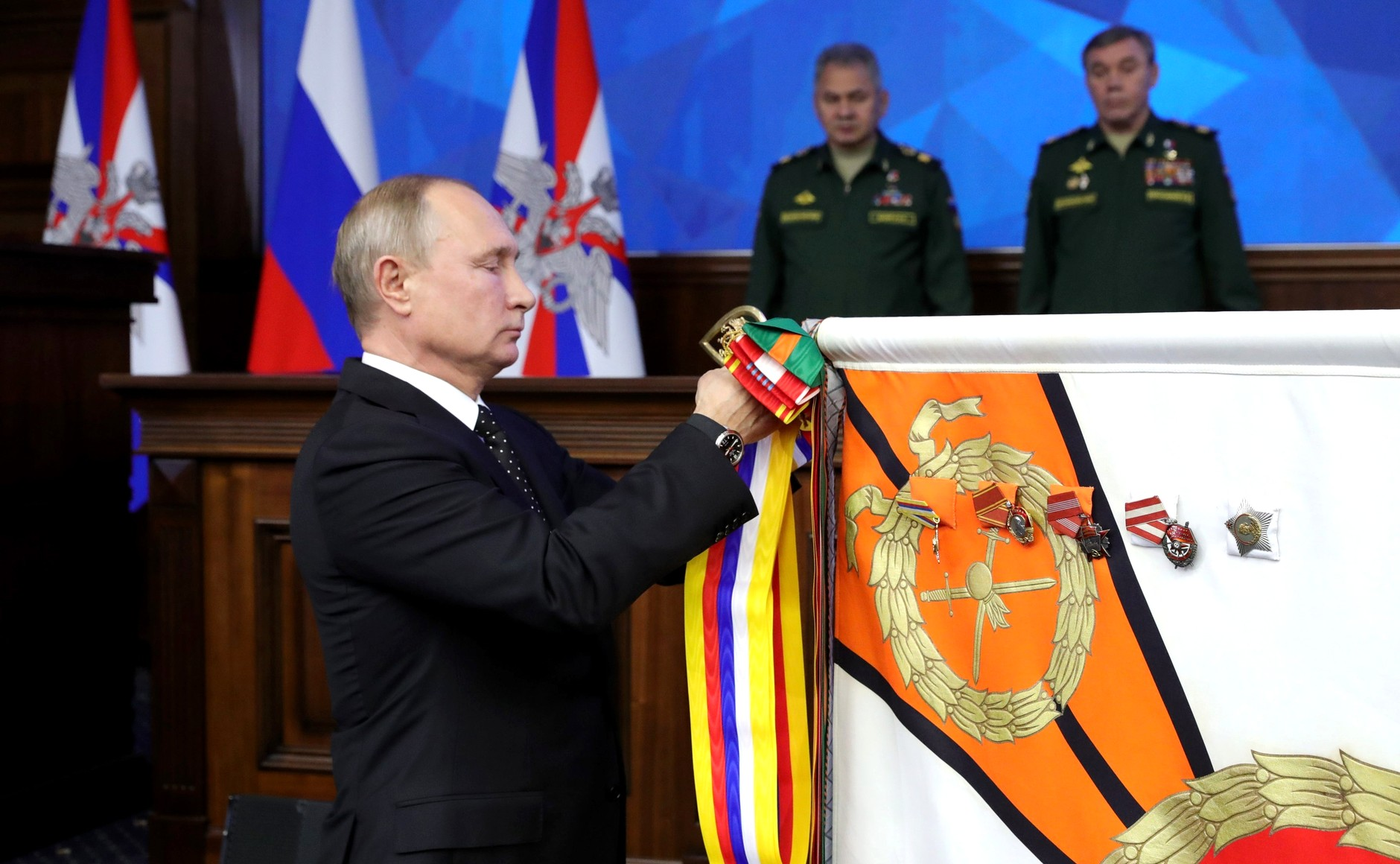
President Putin awarding the academy the Order of Zhukov in 2018.

- Colonel General Leonid Zolotov (August 1998 - September 2002)
- Colonel General Vladimir Popov (September 2002 - December 2009)
- Major General Alexei Kim (December 2009 - January 2010)
- Lieutenant General Viktor Polyakov (January 2010 - July 2014)
- Lieutenant General Oleg Makarevich (July 2014 - September 2017)
- Lieutenant General Aleksandr Lapin (September - November 2017)
- Lieutenant General Sergey Yudin (November 2017 - April 2018) (Interim)
- Lieutenant General Aleksey Avdeyev (April 2018 - 2019)
- Lieutenant General Alexander Romanchuk (2019 - December 2024)
- Colonel General Gennady Anashkin (Since December 2024)

== Alumni ==
- Sulim Yamadayev
- Oleg Kozlov

== See also ==
- Soviet military academies
- Combined Arms Training Centre (Australia)
- United States Army Combined Arms Center
