= Aleksandr Galkin (general) =

Russian general (born 1958)

- Александр Викторович Галкин
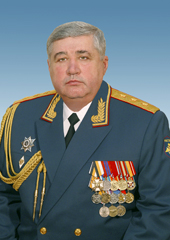
- Galkin in 2009
- Born: Aleksandr Viktorovich Galkin; 22 March 1958 (age 68); Ordzhonikidze, Russian SFSR, Soviet Union
- Military career
- Allegiance: Soviet Union; Russia
- Branch: Russian Ground Forces
- Service years: 1975–present
- Rank: Colonel general
- Commands: Southern Military District (2010–2016)

Aleksandr Viktorovich Galkin (Russian: Александр Викторович Галкин; born on 22 March 1958), is a Russian military leader, a colonel general as of 2011, who was the Commander of the Southern Military District from 2010 to 2016.

== Biography ==
Aleksandr Galkin was born in Ordzhonikidze (present-day Vladikavkaz) on 22 March 1958.

In 1979, he graduated from the Ordzhonikidze Higher Combined Arms Command School named after Marshal of the Soviet Union A.I. Yeremenko. He served in the Group of Soviet Forces in Germany and in the Far Eastern Military District. He rose from the commander of a motorized rifle platoon to the commander of a motorized rifle battalion.

In 1990, he graduated from the Frunze Military Academy. From 1990 to 1992, he continued to serve in the Transcaucasian and Far Eastern military districts as deputy commander and commander of a motorized rifle regiment.

From 1992 to 1997, he served as chief of staff and a deputy commander of a motorized rifle division. From 1997 to 2001, he served as commander of a motorized rifle division.

In 2003, he graduated from the Military Academy of the General Staff of the Armed Forces. He served as the Deputy Commander of the 41st Army, and the Chief of Staff, as the First Deputy Commander of the 36th Army.

On 3 January 2006, Galkin was appointed commander of the 41st Army in the Siberian Military District in Novosibirsk. On 8 April 2008, he was appointed Deputy Commander of the Siberian Military District. On 3 December 2008, he was appointed Chief of Staff, the First Deputy Commander of the Siberian Military District.

On 13 January 2010, Galkin was appointed Commander of North Caucasus Military District. On 10 December 2010, by decree of the President of Russia, he was appointed commander of the troops of the Southern Military District, due to the massive transformation of all Russian military districts in 2010.

On 11 June 2011, Galkin was awarded the military rank of Colonel General.

On 17 March 2014, the European Union included Galkin in the sanctions list of persons whose assets are frozen in the EU and in respect of whom visa restrictions have been introduced.

At the end of August 2015, the Security Service of Ukraine announced that, through the headquarters of the Southern Military District, headed by Galkin, the General Staff of the Armed Forces of the Russian Federation had led Russian troops in the armed conflict in eastern Ukraine.

In June 2016, Galkin was relieved of his post as commander of the Southern Military District. Since January 2017, he has continued to serve in the central office of the Russian Ministry of Defence as an Assistant to the Minister of Defence.

== Family ==
Galkin is married with two children. His son, Denis, is a judge of the Southern District Military Court.
