= Uglegorsky (rural locality) =

Rural locality in Tatsinsky District, Rostov Oblast, Russia

Coordinates: 48°11′N 41°17′E

Uglegorsky (Russian: Углегорский) is a rural locality (a settlement) in Tatsinsky District of Rostov Oblast, Russia. Population: 2,489 (2002 census); 3,019 (1989 Soviet census). It lies 6 km from the railway station Tatsinskaya.
