= Southern front of the Russo-Ukrainian war (2022–present) =

Aspect of 2022 military offensive

- Part of the Russo-Ukrainian war (2022–present)
Date	24 February 2022 – present (4 years, 7 months and 5 days)
Location	Southern Ukraine (Kherson Oblast, Mykolaiv Oblast, Zaporizhzhia Oblast, southern Donetsk Oblast)
Status	Ongoing: Russian forces capture Kherson, Mariupol, Melitopol, Nova Kakhovka, Oleshky, Berdiansk, Snihurivka, Enerhodar, and Huliaipole. The Russian army advances to Mykolaiv and attempts to encircle the city, but is pushed back.; Russian forces reach Mariupol from the west and assist troops advancing from the Donbas in the takeover of the city.; Occupation regimes are installed by Russia in Kherson Oblast Zaporizhzhia Oblast.; Ukrainian forces recapture all of Mykolaiv Oblast (except the Kinburn Peninsula) and all of right-bank Kherson Oblast including Kherson City during a counteroffensive in the south.

Belligerents
Russia: Donetsk People's Republic; Kherson Oblast (Russia); Zaporozhye Oblast (Russia)	Ukraine: Donetsk Oblast; Kherson Oblast; Mykolaiv Oblast; Zaporizhzhia Oblast

Commanders and leaders
(Russia) Vladimir Putin; (Russia) Valery Gerasimov; (Russia) Gennady Zhidko; (Russia) Oleg Salyukov; (Russia) Nikolai Yevmenov; (Russia) Sergey Dronov; (Russia) Andrey Mordvichev; (Russia) Yakov Rezantsev (killed per Ukrainian claim); (Russia) Arkady Marzoyev	(Ukraine) Volodymyr Zelenskyy; (Ukraine) Valerii Zaluzhnyi; (Ukraine) Oleksandr Syrskyi; (Ukraine) Andrii Sokolov; (Ukraine) Vitaliy Nevinsky; (Ukraine) Dmytro Marchenko

Units involved
See order of battle	See order of battle

Strength
Up to 20,000 in 25 BTGs (invasion force, 24 February 2022); 7 brigades (west bank Kherson, May 2022); 20,000–25,000 (west bank Kherson, August 2022, per Ukraine); 40,000 (west bank Kherson and support units, October 2022, per Budanov); 152,000 (Kherson and Zaporizhzhia Oblasts, May 2023, per Ukraine); 200,000 (October 2024, per Ukraine)	1,800 (24 February 2022, pre-invasion); 8 brigades (west bank Kherson, May 2022); 20,000 (west bank Kherson, August 2022)

On 24 February 2022, the Russian military invaded Kherson Oblast in southern Ukraine from Russian-occupied Crimea, quickly entering Mykolaiv Oblast and Zaporizhzhia Oblast amid battles with the Armed Forces of Ukraine.

Elements from the southern Russian offensive joined forces with elements advancing from the Donbas to jointly surround and bombard the city of Mariupol in Donetsk Oblast, which fell after months of siege.

Kherson was surrounded two days into the war, after which Russian forces advanced to the outskirts of Mykolaiv, which they failed to capture. The front then stabilised until a Ukrainian offensive in August. Ukrainian forces retook all of the territory west and north of the Dnieper river, and the front stabilised again just south of Kherson in November 2022. Kherson, the only oblast capital captured by Russia after its 2022 invasion, was liberated on 11 November.

== Background ==
In the aftermath of the Maidan Revolution in 2014, Russia annexed the Crimean Peninsula from Ukraine. Russian troops occupied the self-proclaimed Republic of Crimea for the next eight years. The Chonhar Peninsula bordering Crimea was under Russian control until December 2014; the Ukrainian military began fortifying it the following year, placing explosives on several bridges in the area, though most of these failed to detonate on the first day of the invasion.

The Russian military presence in Crimea significantly increased during the pre-war military buildup on Ukraine's borders, with over 10,000 additional troops deployed in late January and early February. On the eve of the invasion, Russian manpower in Crimea was estimated at 90,000.

Ukrainian plans called for Operational Command South, under Major General Andrii Sokolov, to be assigned two brigades of 3,000-5,000 men each, and a battalion of 500 troops stationed directly on the border with Crimea. In case of active hostilities, the formation was to be reinforced with two brigades of territorial defense: the 110th and 124th.

In reality, the Ukrainian force in the south mostly consisted of the main units of the 59th Motorized Infantry Brigade and the 137th Marine Battalion of the 35th Marine Brigade. A planned second brigade was never assigned, the territorial defense brigades had yet to be staffed, and the existing units were only at about 50-60% strength due to losses from fighting in the east and training assignments for various sub-units in different parts of the country. As a result, the Ukrainian force at the beginning of the invasion comprised about 1,300 men of the 59th Brigade stationed at a camp in the Oleshky Sands, 250-300 marines of the 137th Battalion positioned at the entrances to mainland Ukraine from Crimea, and various supplementary forces numbering "a couple hundred".

Russian documents captured by the Ukrainian military indicated plans to bypass Mykolaiv and land at Odesa within five days, capture Bilhorod-Dnistrovsky by the ninth day of the invasion, and reach the Moldova–Ukraine border by the eleventh day.

By 3:30 on 24 February, Ukraine closed all commercial shipping in the Sea of Azov, leaving more than 100 ships stuck in port. Starting at 4:00, the Ukrainian military observed over thirty Russian military aircraft taking off from Crimea. The planes flew over the Black and Azov Seas, launching strikes on Ukrainian military targets at 5:00, including "almost all" the military facilities in Kherson and Zaporizhzhia Oblasts. Col. Vadym Rymarenko, commanding the 137th Battalion, then reported that the Russian forces in Crimea had opened fire on the battalion's positions on the border.

According to Sokolov, up to 20,000 Russian troops in 25 battalion tactical groups took part in the subsequent invasion, including the entire 22nd Army Corps, at least one division of the 58th Combined Arms Army, and around half of the 7th Air Assault Division.

== Timeline ==
=== Russian invasion ===
==== Kherson and Mykolaiv Oblasts ====
Russian troops cross into southern Ukraine from Crimea on 24 February 2022

Shortly after Russian President Vladimir Putin announced a military operation in Ukraine, the Russian Air Force began to launch cruise and ballistic missiles at targets in several cities in Kherson Oblast. With air support, Russian Armed Forces then crossed into Kherson Oblast from Crimea. The Russian Navy used a naval blockade in the Black Sea to prevent Ukraine from providing support to units located near Kherson Oblast, and restrict commercial trade and the flow of goods to southern Ukraine.

By evening, the Russians had reached Kherson. The Russians initially crossed the Dnieper River over the Antonovskiy Bridge, but Ukrainian mechanized forces were able to recapture the bridge.

Combat engineers of Ukraine's 137th Battalion were ordered to destroy a bridge connecting Henichesk with the Arabat Spit, in an attempt to slow the advance of Russian troops from Crimea, allowing the Ukrainians to retreat and regroup. Vitalii Skakun, the combat engineer who planted the explosives on the bridge, did not have enough time to retreat from the bridge, and so detonated the mines, killing himself and destroying the bridge.

The Ukrainian military announced that its Operational Command South had prepared the defense of Melitopol and was conducting defensive operations outside the settlement of Rykove.

Russian troops moved towards Nova Kakhovka and established control over the North Crimean Canal on 24 February. Following Russia's 2014 annexation of Crimea, Ukraine had blocked the canal, which had provided 85% of Crimea's drinking water. Sergey Aksyonov, head of the Republic of Crimea, told local authorities to prepare the canal to receive water from the Dnieper and resume the supply of water to Crimea the following day.

Russian forces recaptured the Antonovskiy Bridge on the evening of 25 February.

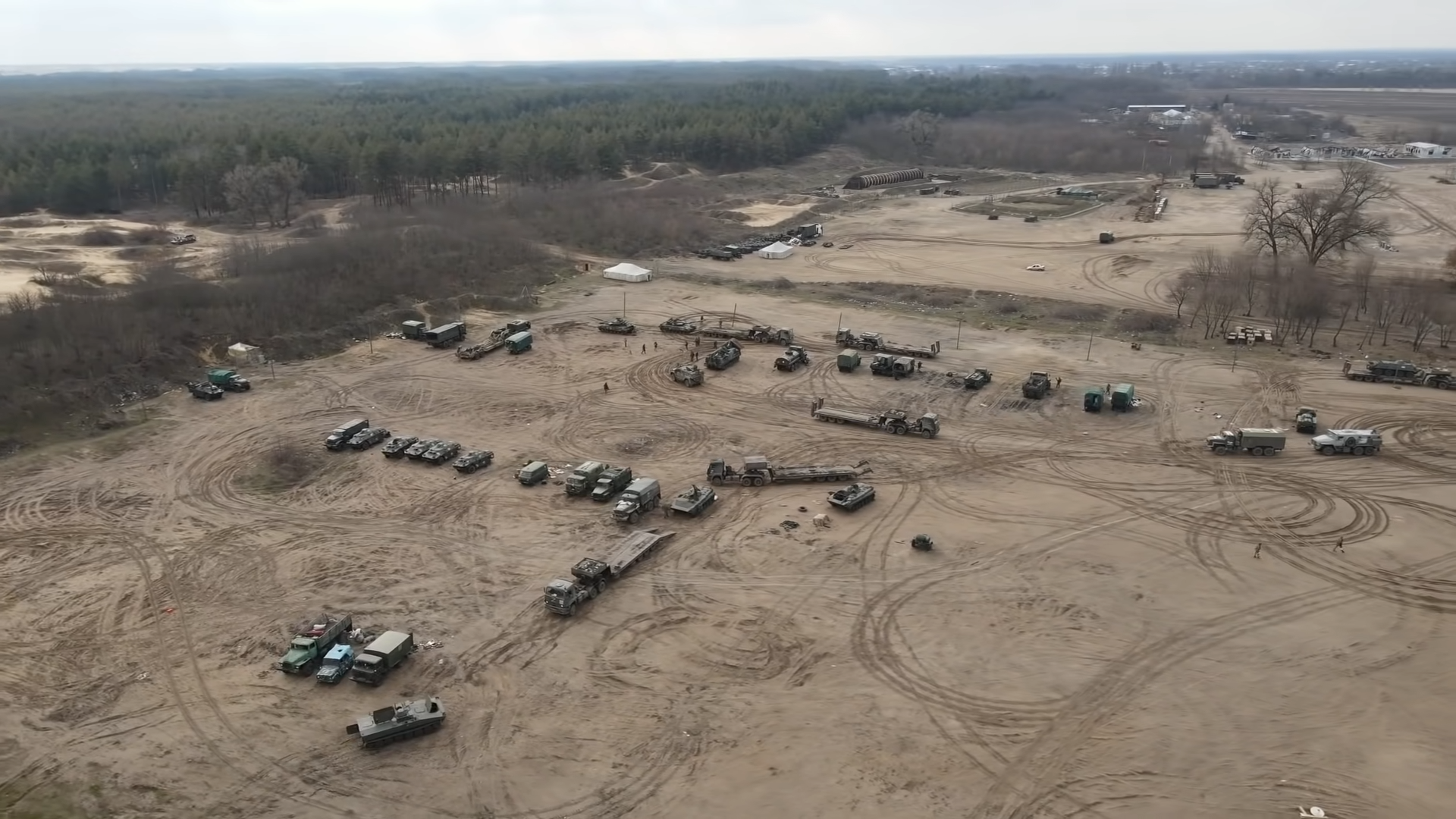
Russian military vehicles at a captured Ukrainian military base near Radensk, Kherson, March 2022

On 26 February, according to Kherson mayor Ihor Kolykhaiev, a Ukrainian airstrike forced the Russians to retreat from Kherson, leaving the city under Ukrainian control. Ukrainian forces later recaptured the bridge. A Ukrainian official said that Russian forces had killed a journalist and an ambulance driver near the village of Zelenivka, a northern suburb of Kherson.

Another Ukrainian official later claimed that a Russian army column was defeated between the towns of Radensk and Oleshky, just south of Kherson.

In the afternoon of 26 February, 12 Russian tanks managed to break through in Kakhovka on the Dnieper and began advancing towards Mykolaiv. Vitaliy Kim, the governor of Mykolaiv Oblast, said the city had had five hours to prepare. Artillery and other arms were prepared.

By evening, Russian tanks were in the outskirts of Mykolaiv. Oleksandr Senkevych, the mayor of Mykolaiv, ordered citizens to stay indoors, as far away from windows as possible. Shortly after, Russian troops entered the city and a battle erupted outside of a shopping mall about 10 minutes later. According to some reports, tanks "passed through the city". There were also sightings of large fires. The next day, Ukrainian officials claimed that Russian forces were fully driven away from Mykolaiv. The city was extensively damaged.

Russian Ministry of Defense spokesperson Igor Konashenkov announced that the city of Henichesk and Kherson International Airport had surrendered to Russian forces in the morning. Later, Russian forces encircled and captured a part of Kherson, with Ukrainian officials corroborating this claim.

On 28 February, Ukrainian official Vadim Denysenko accused Russian forces of trying to use civilians from villages around Kherson as human shields to cross the bridge into Kherson. The same day, Russian troops advanced from Kherson towards Mykolaiv, reaching the city's outskirts and launching an assault at 11:00.

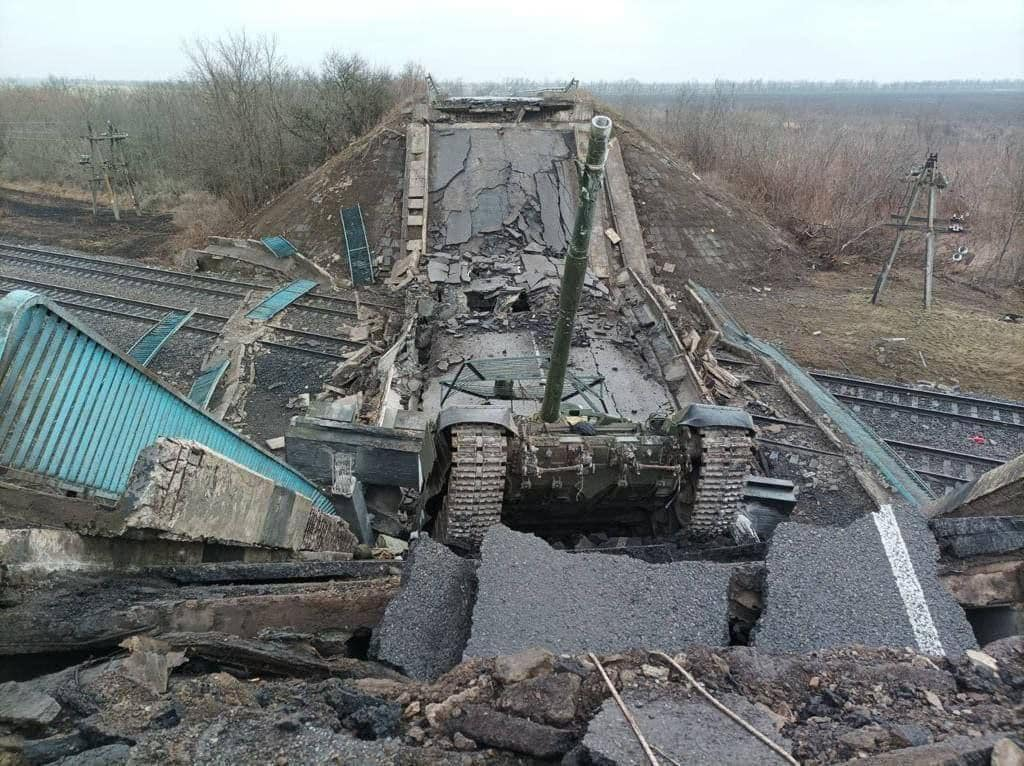
A Russian T-72 tank trapped on a bridge demolished by the Ukrainians in Kalynivka, Mykolaiv Oblast, 2 March

Russian forces also shelled Bashtanka and Mykolaiv on 1 March. Ukrainian officials later claimed that a large Russian convoy was attacked and defeated by Ukrainian forces during the night near Bashtanka, forcing the Russians to retreat towards the neighboring city of Novyi Buh. They claimed that "several dozen [Russian] armored vehicles" were destroyed in the attack. Kim stated that during the operation, a Ukrainian helicopter was destroyed, but its pilots survived.

The next day, Russian forces bombarded Voznesensk, which has a bridge that can be used to cross the Southern Bug instead of the one near Mykolaiv, during the morning. Russian paratroopers then landed at a forested ridge near the town, and an armored column approached it. Forces from the 126th Coastal Defence Brigade were attacked while trying to reach them.

The Russian troops, estimated to be 400 by Ukrainian officials, then captured the village of Rakove, whose houses it used to create a sniper nest. Afterwards, they set up a base at a gas station near the town's entrance and assaulted the base of the Territorial Defense Forces. Ukrainian forces struck back with artillery that night with the help of local volunteers who gave them coordinates. Local volunteers and Ukrainian soldiers were able to repel Russian troops from Voznesensk the next day, forcing most of them to retreat 40 miles (64 km) to the east and others to flee into nearby forests, where ten of them were later captured. Ukrainian officials stated that Russian forces had lost 30 vehicles in the battle, in addition to around 100 soldiers. Ten civilians were killed in the fighting.

In the early morning of 1 March, Russian forces began assaulting Kherson from the west, advancing from Kherson International Airport towards the highway to Mykolaiv. They were able to surround the city and reached the neighboring settlement of Komyshany. Later in the day, Russian forces entered Kherson.

In the early morning of 2 March, Russian forces seized parts of Kherson, including the city's central square. Later that evening, Kolykhaiev announced that he had surrendered the city to Russian forces, and that the Russian commander planned to set up a military administration in the city. Kherson became the first major Ukrainian city to fall to Russian forces in the invasion.

On 2 March, Kim announced that Ukrainian forces carried out strikes on Chornobaivka and in the Yelanets area, and that a Russian column left Snihurivka.

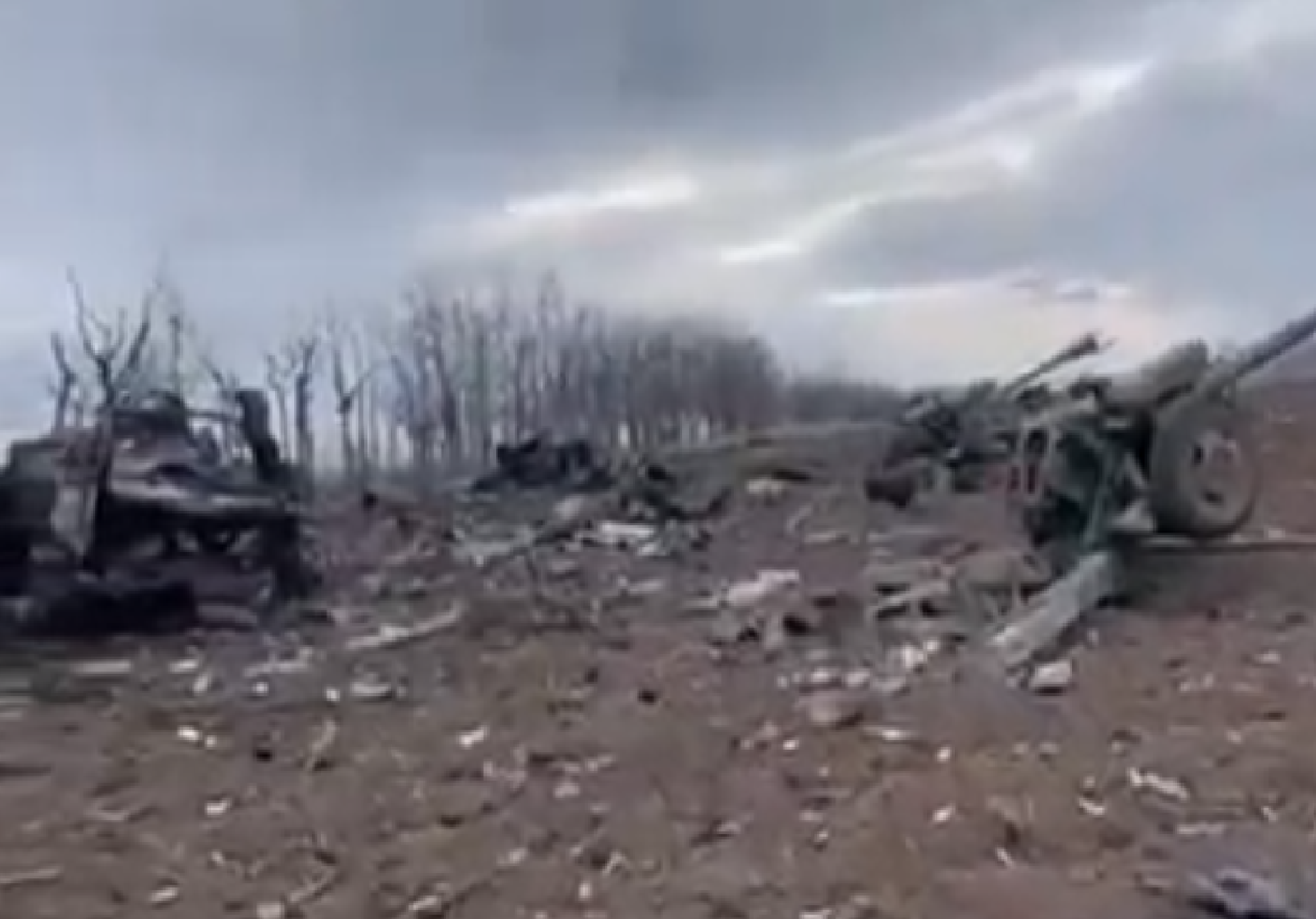
Destroyed Russian artillery and vehicles near Mykolaiv, 3 March 2022

Russian troops attacked Mykolaiv on 4 March. Local officials stated that Russian forces had captured some of the outskirts of the city. Ukrainian forces repelled the attack, recapturing Mykolaiv International Airport.

On 8 March, the Ukrainian Air Force struck the military airbase at Kherson International Airport during the day, with Ukrainian officials claiming that more than 30 Russian helicopters were destroyed. Satellite imagery however showed that the number was fewer.

On 9 March, Russian troops entered the town of Skadovsk. According to local residents they entered at 08:45 and stationed themselves in the central square before being driven away by protesters. They then took over a building of the National Police of Ukraine in addition to vandalizing the city council building. The mayor Oleksandr Yakovlev stated that they took away computers from the city council building and had ordered that no political rallies be held.

The next day, the Ukrainian General Staff reported that Russia deployed a battalion of the Baltic Fleet's 336th Naval Infantry Brigade toward Mykolaiv. The Institute for the Study of War opined that "Russian forces are likely experiencing difficulty advancing northwest beyond the Inhul River." Heavy shelling hit Mykolaiv during the evening, causing several fires, and Vitaliy Kim reported "active hostilities" near Hur'ivka north of the city.

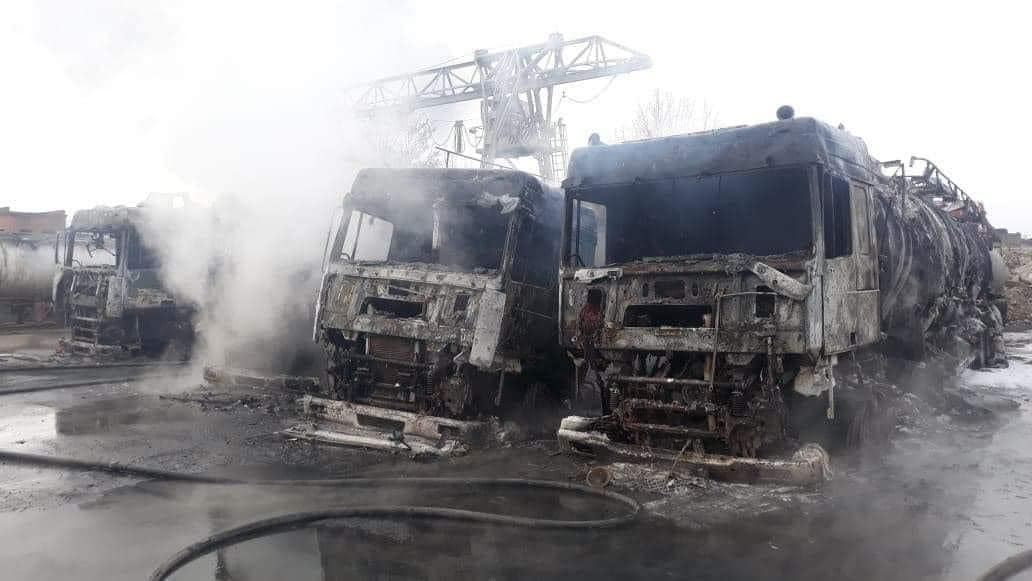
Burned vehicles in Mykolaiv after Russian attacks

==== Zaporizhzhia Oblast ====
Russian columns advancing from Crimea moved towards Melitopol, which surrendered to Russian forces after a small skirmish on 25 February.

Russian forces captured the coastal city of Prymorsk by 13:40 on 26 February. Russian forces were also able to enter and capture Berdiansk, west of Mariupol, capturing its port and the Berdiansk Airport. During the takeover, local authorities reported that one person was killed and another was wounded. On 28 February, mayor Oleksandr Svidlo said that Russian forces had left Berdiansk, leaving a Russian military police detachment in the city.

On 27 February, Russian forces took control of the villages of Skelky, Shevchenka, and Pershotravneve near Vasylivka. Russian forces tried to enter Dniprorudne on the same day, but were forced to turn back after being confronted by protesting locals. Vasylivka was held by a force consisting of Ukraine's 128th Mountain Assault Brigade, territorial defense forces, and some marines, until they retreated on 2 March. Nearly encircled, Ukrainian forces withdrew on foot, abandoning their vehicles in Vasylivka, and took up positions in the village of Mali Shcherbaky. The next day, Russian forces began shelling Mali Shcherbaky and Shcherbaky, but never managed to take the villages, despite the heavy bombardment.

Elsewhere, according to Ukrainian media reports, Russian sabotage and reconnaissance groups stole Ukrainian military uniforms from a military depot and engaged Ukrainian forces in Tokmak, northeast of Melitopol. According to Ukrainian authorities, the Russians were identified because they wore bulletproof vests that were used by the Russian army, and not the Ukrainian vests. Ukraine claimed Russian forces suffered many casualties and retreated to the southern outskirts of the town.

Russian forces advancing from Tokmak entered Polohy on 3 March after clashing with a Ukrainian territorial defense group. On the same day, it was announced by the Russian ministry of defense that its forces had taken the Zaporizhzhia Oblast settlements of Pokrovske, Chystopillia, and Novopoltavka. Russian forces briefly entered Huliaipole on 5 March, but were pushed back. The city was later attacked overnight amid shelling and airstrikes.

The Russian 22nd Army Corps approached the city of Enerhodar on 26 February. A Ukrainian official stated that the Russians were deploying Grad missiles and warned of an attack on the Zaporizhzhia Nuclear Power Plant, which is located in the city. The Zaporizhzhia Regional State Administration later stated that the Russian forces advancing on Enerhodar had returned to Velyka Bilozerka, a village 30 kilometres (19 mi) from the city. On 28 February, Russian troops began a siege at Enerhodar in an attempt to take control of the nuclear power plant. On the same day, the Russian Ministry of Defense claimed that Russian forces had captured the city and surrounded the power plant, but this was denied by mayor Dmitri Orlov. A video later emerged showing local civilians preventing a Russian convoy from entering Enerhodar by barricading the entrance, forcing them to leave.

Ukrainian officials stated that Russian forces had surrounded Enerhodar on 1 March, with a Russian convoy advancing into the city around 14:00. According to the mayor, the city had difficulties obtaining food.

On 3 March, Orlov stated that a large Russian convoy had entered Enerhodar. Later, Russian forces took control of the Zaporizhzhia Nuclear Power Plant. During the heavy fighting a fire broke out in a training facility outside of the main complex, which was quickly extinguished, though other sections surrounding the plant sustained damage. Initial reports said that the radiation levels remained normal during this time and the fire did not damage essential equipment. However, firefighters were unable to reach the fire due to the fighting.

Clashes at the power plant on 4 March caused a fire to break out. The International Atomic Energy Agency (IAEA) subsequently said that essential equipment was undamaged. By 4 March, the nuclear power plant fell under Russian control. Despite the fires, the power plant recorded no radiation leaks.

The next morning, after confirming that there were no changes to radiation levels, Russian forces captured Enerhodar and the Zaporizhzhia Nuclear Power Plant. On 5 March, Orlov stated that Russian forces controlled the perimeter of Enerhodar and the power plant, while the local authorities were allowed to remain in control in the operation of the city.

==== Southern Donetsk Oblast: siege of Mariupol ====
On the morning of 25 February, Russian units from the Donetsk People's Republic (DPR) advanced towards Mariupol and were defeated by Ukrainian forces near the village of Pavlopil. By evening, the Russian Navy reportedly began an amphibious assault on the coast of the Sea of Azov 70 kilometres (43 mi) west of Mariupol. A US defence official said that Russian forces might be deploying thousands of marines from this beachhead.

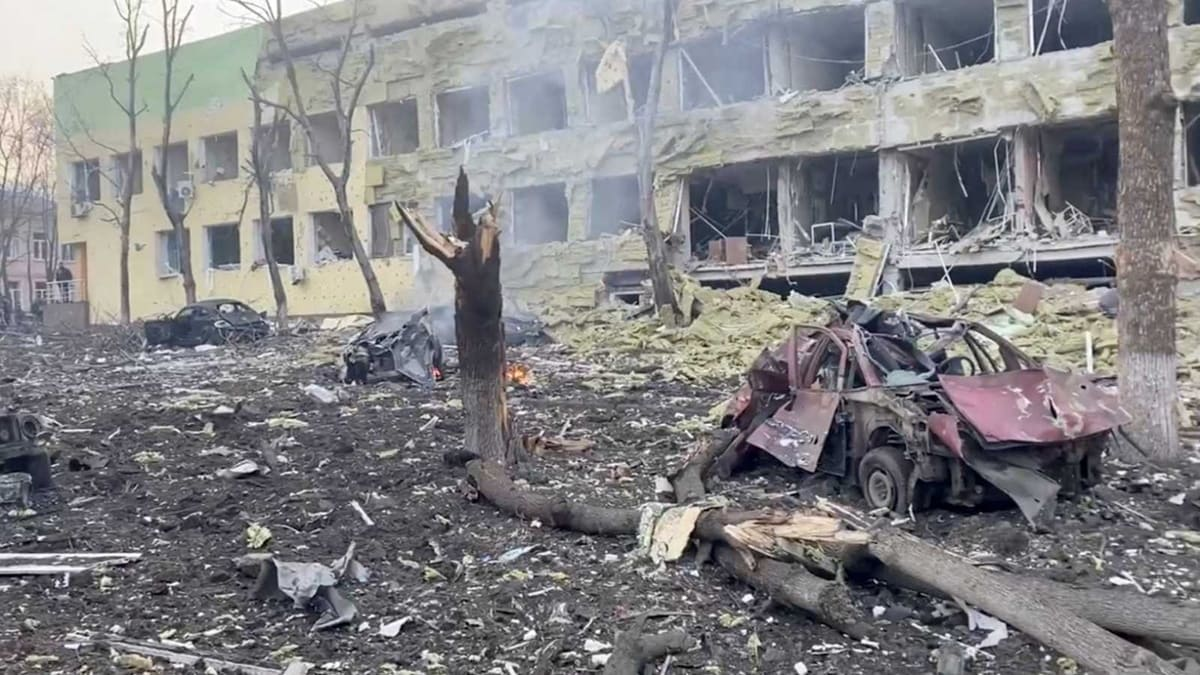
Remnants of a shelled hospital in Mariupol, 9 March 2022

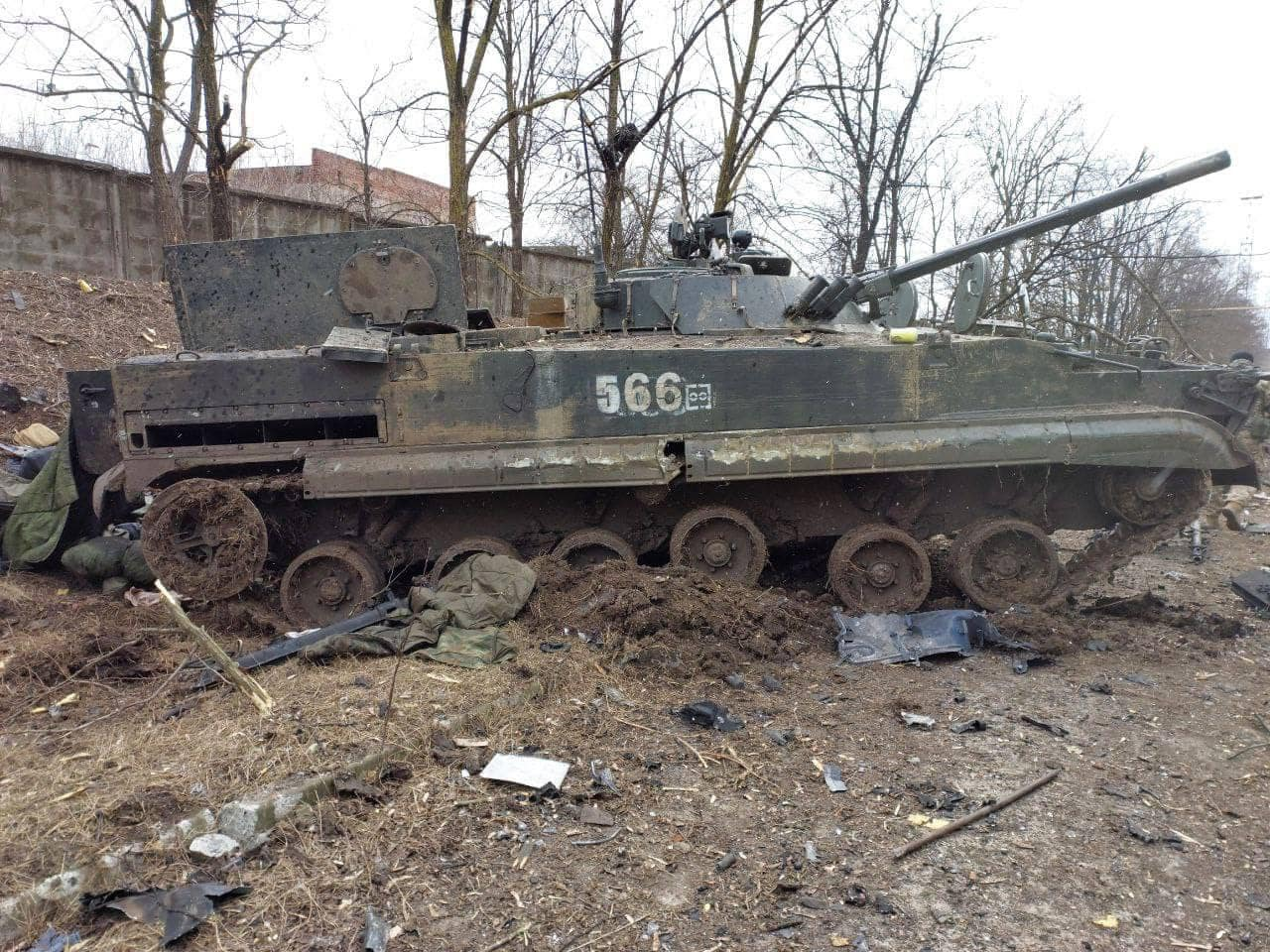
A destroyed Russian BMP-3 near Mariupol, 7 March 2022

By 3 March, amid heavy combat in Mariupol, Ukrainian officials alleged that hundreds of civilians had already been killed in the city.

=== Fall of Mariupol, Ukrainian counterattacks, and stalemate ===
==== Mykolaiv and Kherson Oblasts ====
On 15 March, the Russian Defense Ministry stated that Russian forces had captured all of Kherson Oblast.

On 11 March, Governor Kim stated that Ukrainian forces had pushed Russian troops eastwards by 15–20 kilometres (9.3–12.4 mi) and had also surrounded some units who were negotiating for a surrender. On 16 March, the Ukrainian government said that its forces had begun a counteroffensive near Mykolaiv towards Kherson and captured the town of Posad-Pokrovske. Ukrainian troops in the village said their objective was to retake Kherson International Airport.

Gennady Korban, head of Staff of Dnipro Oblast's Territorial Defense Forces, stated that the region was prepared for a Russian offensive, unlike Kherson and Zaporizhzhia oblasts. He added that Russian forces were staging in the settlements of Velyka Oleksandrivka, Novovorontsovka and Arkhanhelske. On 17 March, the Ukrainian military reported that Russian forces achieved "minor successes" in attacks towards Kryvyi Rih, capturing the village of Mala Shestirnia. By 31 March, Ukraine's 60th Infantry Brigade and the 4th Battalion of the 17th Tank Brigade had captured eleven settlements in the northern portion of Kherson Oblast: Novovorontsovka, Mala Shestirnia, Novohryhorivka, Topolyne, Kniazivka, Krasnivka, Svobodne, Kamyanka, Pryhirya, Kochubeivka and Orlove. By 10 April, Ukrainian forces had made significant advances and pushed back the Russian military in the area around Kherson, gaining ground at Osokorivka and Oleksandrivka. Russian counter-attacks failed to retake the lost territory, while Ukraine continued to harass local Russian airfields.

By 18 April, fighting continued, and Ukraine claimed that its 80th Air Assault Brigade had retaken a number of villages near Mykolaiv. Two days later, Russia counter-attacked and made minor gains at Oleksandrivka. Gerashchenko announced that Ukrainian forces captured three villages near Snihurivka on 27 April.

By May, the situation in right-bank Kherson Oblast had become a stalemate, with the opposing forces evenly matched and unable to go on the offensive. Units of the Russian 49th Combined Arms Army and the Crimea-based 22nd Army Corps held a bridgehead over the Dnieper approximately 160 km wide and 50 km deep. According to Ukrainian military expert Viktor Kevliuk, the strategic purpose of the Russian bridgehead was to protect the North Crimean Canal and the "land bridge" between Crimea and mainland Russia, as well as to serve as a staging area for a future Russian operation aimed at reaching Transnistria and cutting off Ukrainian access to the Black Sea. Russian forces were said to be preparing second and third lines of defense, fortifying airfields, ports and railway stations, and mining the coast of the Kakhovka Reservoir in anticipation of a Ukrainian counterattack.

Reports began emerging on 27 May that Ukrainian troops were conducting counteroffensive efforts over the Inhulets River. Ukrainian forces established a bridgehead over the river by 29 May and took Davydiv Brid by 31 May, but the village had returned to Russian control by 17 June.

In northern Kherson Oblast, units of Ukraine's 60th Brigade took control of the village of Potiomkyne on 30 June, and then captured Ivanivka on 11 July.

==== Fall of Mariupol ====
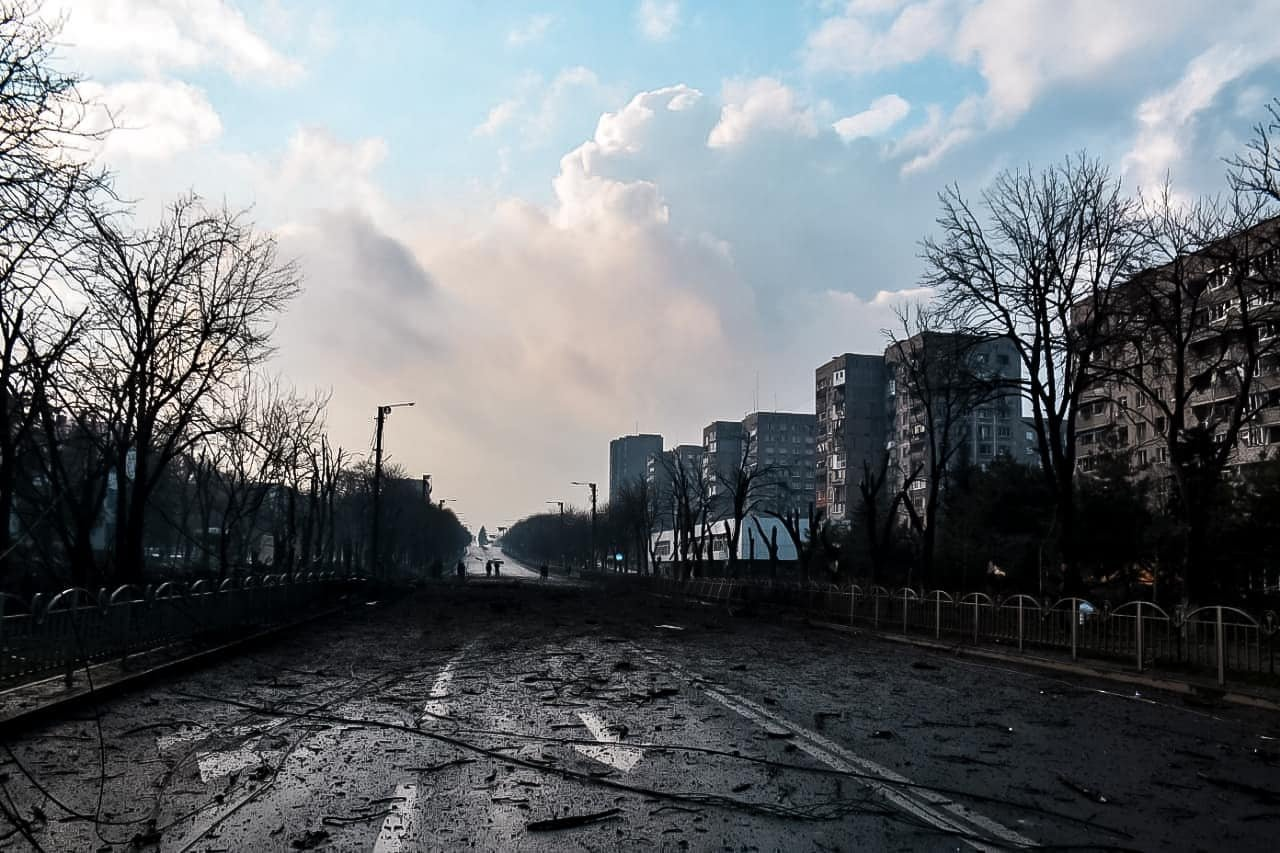
A downtown street during the siege of Mariupol

In a telephone conversation with Emmanuel Macron on 29 March, Putin stated that the bombardment of Mariupol would end only when Ukrainian troops fully surrendered Mariupol.

On 1 April, a rescue effort by the United Nations (UN) to transport hundreds of civilian survivors out of Mariupol with 50 allocated buses was impeded by Russian troops, who refused the buses safe passage into the city while peace talks continued in Istanbul.

According to the Mariupol City Council, by 15 March, 2,357 civilians had been killed during the city's siege. Following a renewed missile attack on 14 March in Mariupol, the Ukrainian government claimed more than 2,500 deaths in the city. By 18 March, Mariupol was completely encircled and fighting reached the city centre, hampering efforts to evacuate civilians. The Russians demanded a full surrender, which several Ukrainian government officials including Zelenskyy refused. On 24 March, Russian forces entered central Mariupol, seizing the Church of the Intercession of the Mother of God. The city administration alleged that Russians were trying to demoralize residents by publicly shouting claims of Russian victories, including statements that Odesa had been captured. On 27 March, Ukraine's deputy prime minister, Olha Stefanishyna, stated that Mariupol "simply does not exist anymore," and that Russia's objectives have "nothing to do with humanity." Stefanishyna summarized that: "They (Mariupol's inhabitants) don’t have access to water, to any food supplies, to anything. More than 85 percent of the whole town is destroyed."

==== Zaporizhzhia Oblast ====
In Zaporizhzhia Oblast, Ukrainian forces had recaptured the villages of Malynivka, Poltavka by 27 March, and had also retaken the settlements of Zatyshshia, Zelenyi Hai, Vesele and Chervone by 31 March.

=== 2022 Kherson counteroffensive ===
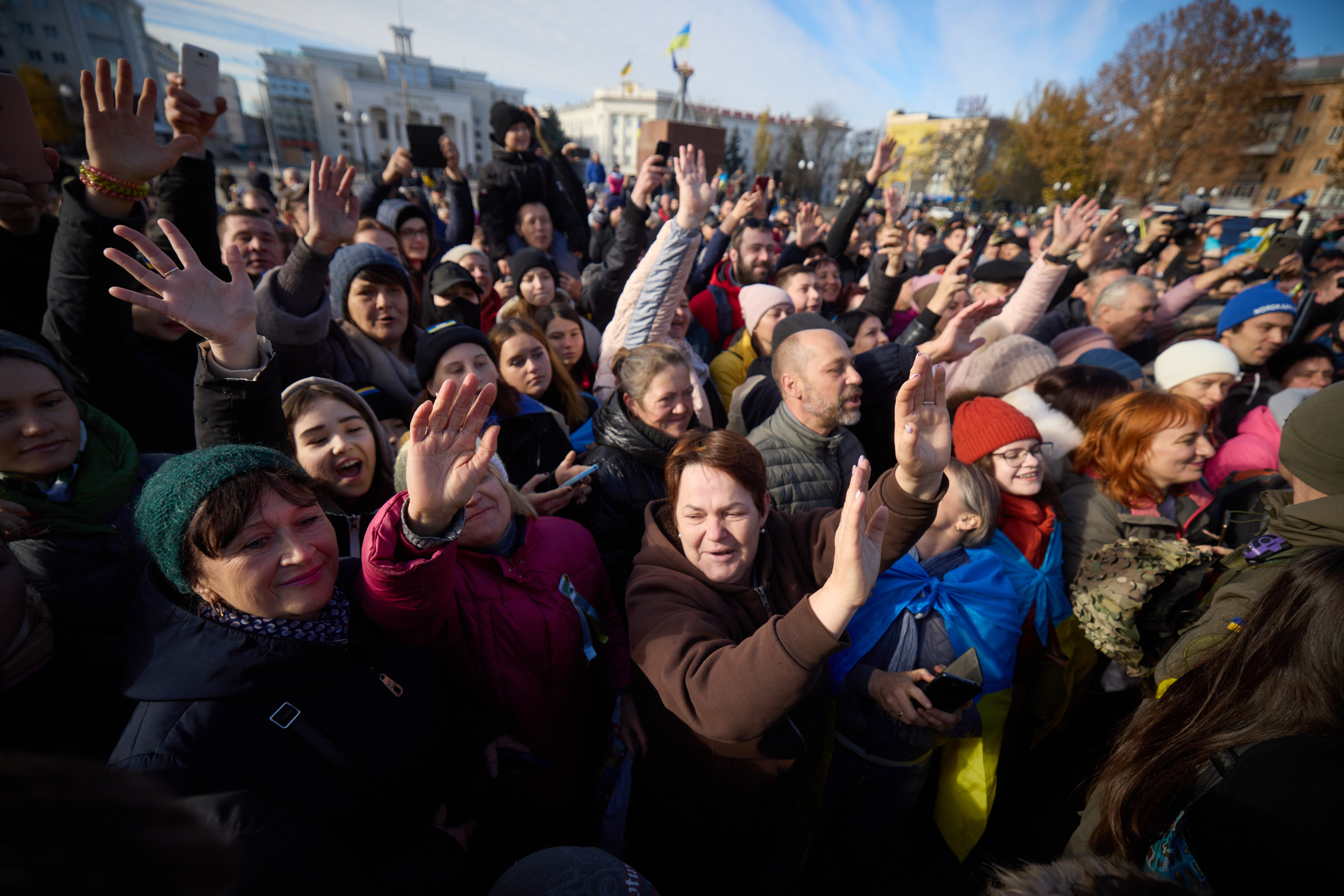
Civilians during President Volodymyr Zelenskyy's visit following the liberation of Kherson, 14 November 2022

On 10 July, Iryna Vereshchuk, the Deputy Prime Minister of Ukraine and the Minister of Reintegration of Temporarily Occupied Territories, urged civilians in Kherson Oblast to evacuate ahead of an upcoming Ukrainian counterattack there, without specifying when the offensive would take place. Ukraine's defence minister Oleksii Reznikov also signalled an upcoming offensive in the region.

On 11 July, Ukrainian forces launched a missile attack with HIMARS rockets on the Russian-occupied city of Nova Kakhovka. Ukrainian officials claimed that the strike killed the chief of staff for the 22nd Army Corps, Major General Artyom Nasbulin, along with five colonels and a total of 150 soldiers. Russian forces confirmed the strike but did not confirm the death of the officers claimed by Ukraine, claiming that the Ukrainian rocket hit a warehouse that contained chemicals which then exploded.

On 29 August, Ukraine launched a counteroffensive on the Kherson front. During a 3 day period from 2 October to 4 October, Ukraine liberated 11 settlements in northern Kherson, including Davydiv Brid. On 9 November, Russia announced the withdrawal of troops from Kherson, with Ukrainian troops reportedly entering Snihurivka the next day. On 11 November, Ukrainian troops entered the city of Kherson, and were met by crowds of Ukrainian citizens chanting "Slava Ukraini!" and "Glory to the ZSU," expressing their gratitude by lifting up soldiers and waving Ukrainian flags.

=== Russian entrenchment and beginning of Dnieper campaign ===
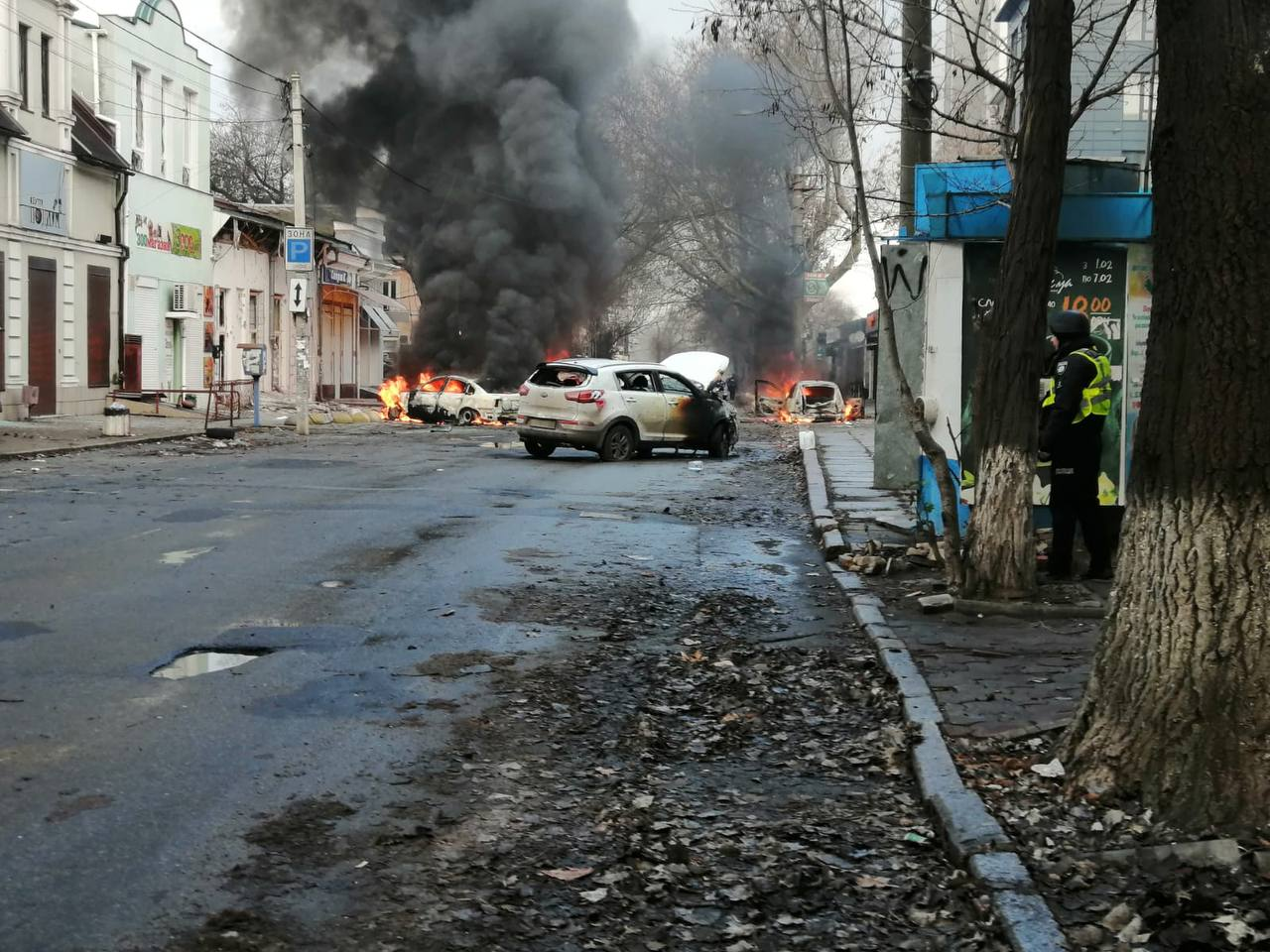
Aftermath of Russian shelling of Kherson city, 24 December 2022

In the aftermath of Ukraine's recapture of right-bank Kherson Oblast, Ukrainian forces began conducting a small-scale military campaign on the Dnieper, conducting raids and incursions on the left bank and on the Kinburn Spit.

In December 2022, following previous successful counteroffensives, speculation among Western analysts and media about a prospective Ukrainian campaign to retake Crimea abounded. In the event of such an offensive, observers and analysts suggested Ukraine could attack along the Zaporizhzhia front and advance towards the strategic city of Melitopol to cut Russia's "landbridge to Crimea." Throughout the month, Russia reinforced its defense lines in southern Ukraine, particularly along the Zaporizhzhia and Kherson fronts. Attacks on "collaborators" and Russian agents by apparent Ukrainian partisans and saboteurs continued.

On 23 December, Ukraine's mayor of Melitopol Ivan Fedorov said the Russians were transforming the city into a fortress, replete with dragon's teeth defenses. Meanwhile, satellite imagery showed that Russian troops had established trenches around the perimeters of Tokmak in Zaporizhzhia Oblast, considered a strategic city on the approach towards Melitopol. On 15 May 2023, Ukrainian military intelligence estimated that the Russians had stationed 152,000 troops in Kherson and Zaporizhzhia oblasts in anticipation of a potential Ukrainian counteroffensive.

=== 2023 Ukrainian counteroffensive and continued Dnieper incursions ===
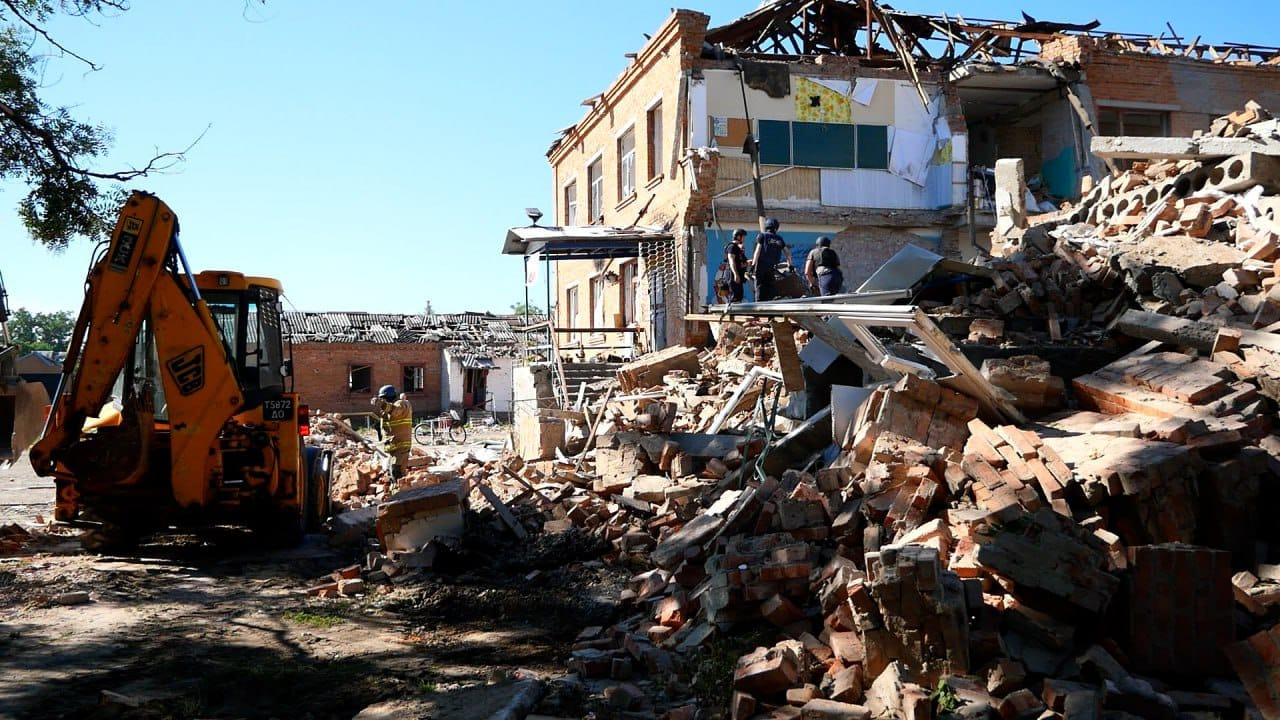
A bombed-out school in Orikhiv, July 2023

As Ukraine prepared to launch its counteroffensive in the south, there were signs of activity on the Dnieper front. However, on June 6, 2023, the Kakhovka Dam in Nova Kakhovka was purposefully destroyed while under Russian control since March 2022, massively flooding the region. Experts assess that Russian forces likely blew the dam up. This forced combat to stop along the river for a time.

In early June 2023, Ukrainian forces launched their counteroffensive on the eastern part of the southern front, focusing on multiple directions, including Orikhiv and Velyka Novosilka, which are located in eastern Zaporizhzhia Oblast and western Donetsk Oblast, respectively. By 11 June, Ukraine had recaptured the front line settlements of Neskuchne, Blahodatne, Storozheve, Makarivka, and Novodarivka. The progress of the offensive slowed as time progressed, despite the capture of several more villages, including Robotyne on 23 August. By December 2023, prominent Ukrainian figures and Western analysts began giving negative assessments of the success of the counteroffensive; statements by Ukrainian general Valerii Zaluzhnyi in early November 2023 that the war had arrived at a "stalemate" were seen by observers as an admission of its failure, and followed more definite assessments made by analysts, especially with regard to operational success, from several weeks earlier. Ukrainian forces did not reach the city of Tokmak, described as a "minimum goal" by Ukrainian general Oleksandr Tarnavskyi, and the probable initial objective of reaching the Sea of Azov to split the Russian forces in southern Ukraine remained unfulfilled.

As the floodwaters from the Dnieper receded, Ukraine resumed its incursions across the river on a larger scale. In December 2023, Ukraine established a foothold on the left bank at the village Krynky.

The Ukrainian military announced on 3 March 2024 that it was spending a record amount of funding on fortifying Zaporizhzhia Oblast on the southern front.

On 17 February, fighting resumed in Robotyne when Russian forces started a large-scale attack on the village, recapturing a position south of it. On 15 May 2024, the Russian Ministry of Defence claimed that Russian forces fully recaptured the village. War analyst Emil Kastehelmi stated to The New York Times that the village with its recapture "lacks strategic importance to Russia and is now little more than ruins", but however, that it was still "a symbolic blow to Ukraine after fighting so hard to win it back last year".

On 16 June 2024, the Russian military announced the capture of the village of Zahirne in Zaporizhzhia, located south of Huliaipole. The report could not be independently verified at the time. On 18 July, Krynky was fully recaptured by Russian forces.

In early October 2024, Ukrainian intelligence predicted that Russian forces would restart offensive efforts towards Orikhiv in an effort to sever Ukrainian logistics lines. Russian forces meanwhile restarted combat operations around Kamianske in western Zaporizhzhia Oblast, advancing near the village and the neighbouring Plavni, following a reported unsuccessful Ukrainian attack.

== Order of battle ==
=== Russian and pro-Russian forces ===
- Russian Armed Forces
  - Russian Ground Forces
    - 8th Combined Arms Army
      - 20th Guards Motor Rifle Division
        - 33rd Motor Rifle Regiment
        - 255th Guards Motor Rifle Regiment
        - 944th Self-Propelled Artillery Regiment
        - 358th Anti-Aircraft Rocket Regiment
    - 18th Combined Arms Army
      - 70th Motor Rifle Division
        - 24th Motorized Rifle Regiment
    - 35th Combined Arms Army
      - 38th Separate Guards Motor Rifle Brigade
      - 69th Separate Cover Brigade
    - 49th Combined Arms Army (Nova Kakhovka)
      - 34th Separate Guards Mountain Motor Rifle Brigade
      - 205th Separate Guards Motor Rifle Brigade
      - 1st Guards Rocket Brigade
      - 90th Anti-Aircraft Rocket Brigade
      - 227th Artillery Brigade
    - 58th Guards Combined Arms Army
      - 42nd Guards Motor Rifle Division
        - 291st Motorized Rifle Regiment
          - Nemets group
  - Russian Airborne Forces
    - 7th Guards Mountain Air Assault Division
      - 56th Guards Air Assault Regiment
      - 108th Guards Kuban Cossack Air Assault Regiment
      - 247th Guards Air Assault Regiment
    - 11th Guards Air Assault Brigade
    - 76th Guards Air Assault Division
    - 83rd Guards Air Assault Brigade
  - GRU
    - Spetsnaz GRU
      - 10th Spetsnaz Brigade
    - Special Combat Army Reserve
      - BARS-33
      - BARS-Sarmat Unmanned Systems Special Purpose Center
  - Russian Aerospace Forces
    - Russian Air Force
  - Russian Navy
    - Northern Fleet
      - 61st Separate Guards Naval Infantry Brigade
    - Black Sea Fleet
      - 22nd Army Corps (Kherson)
        - 126th Coastal Defence Brigade
        - 127th Reconnaissance Brigade
      - 439th Rocket Artillery Brigade
      - 291st Artillery Brigade
      - 336th Naval Infantry Brigade
  - Unknown division
    - "Smuglyanka" Detachment
      - "Lotus" drone unit

Donetsk People's Republic People's Militia (until 2023)

  - 109th Separate Rifle Regiment

=== Ukraine ===
- Armed Forces of Ukraine
  - Ukrainian Ground Forces
    - 1st Special Operations Brigade
    - 17th Tank Brigade
    - 28th Mechanized Brigade
    - 59th Motorized Brigade
    - 60th Infantry Brigade
    - 128th Mountain Assault Brigade
    - 98th Infantry Battalion
  - Territorial Defense Forces
    - 123rd Territorial Defense Brigade (Mykolaiv Oblast)
      - 187th Territorial Defense Brigade (Voznesensk)
      - 190th Territorial Defense Brigade (Bashtanka)
    - 124th Territorial Defense Brigade (Kherson Oblast)
      - 192nd Territorial Defense Battalion (Kherson)
      - 194th Territorial Defense Battalion (Bilozerka)
    - 126th Brigade of the Odesa Territorial Defense
      - 220th Battalion
    - 129th Kryvyi Rih Defense Brigade
    - International Legion of Territorial Defense of Ukraine
      - Separate Special Purpose Battalion
  - Ukrainian Air Assault Forces
    - 25th Airborne Brigade
    - 79th Air Assault Brigade
    - 80th Air Assault Brigade
  - Ukrainian Air Force
    - 160th Anti-Aircraft Artillery Brigade (Odesa Anti-Aircraft Missile Brigade)
  - Ukrainian Navy
    - Ukraine Marine Corps
      - 35th Marine Brigade
        - 137th Marine Battalion
      - 36th Marine Brigade

== Environmental impact ==
The war has had a disruptive and destructive impact on the unique plants and wildlife of the Kinburn Spit such as the Сentaurea breviceps and Сentaurea Paczoskii cornflower species, and their sensitive ecosystem. Bombs, and the pollutants that came from them, killed nearby dolphins, and opened the sand and soil to the threat of chemicals seeping in and invasive species, according to the research and policy director at the UK-based Conflict and Environment Observatory Doug Weir. In May 2022 a 4,000 hectares (10,000 acres) fire, started by rockets, inflicted lasting habitat damage to the perennial forests and salt marshes of the spit.

== See also ==
- Crimea attacks (2022–present)
- Russian occupation of Kherson Oblast
- Russian occupation of Zaporizhzhia Oblast
- Northern Ukraine campaign
- Eastern Ukraine campaign
- Snake Island campaign
- Pavel Filatyev
