= Andrei Sokolov =

Andrei Sokolov, Andrey or Andrii Sokolov (Russian: Андрей Соколов) may refer to the following notable people:

- Andrey Sokolov (actor) (born 1962), Soviet and Russian actor
- Andrey Sokolov (animator) (1974–2025), Russian animation director, screenwriter and production designer
- Andrei Sokolov (ice hockey) (born 1968), Kazakhstani ice hockey player
- Andrei Sokolov (Latvian chess player) (born 1972), Soviet/Latvian chess player
- Andrei Sokolov (Russian chess player) (born 1962), Soviet/Russian/French chess player
- Andrii Sokolov, Major General of the Ukrainian Armed Forces
