= 18th Combined Arms Army =

Russian Ground Forces formation

- 18-я общевойсковая армия
- Great emblem of the unit
- Active: June 2023 – present
- Country: Russia
- Branch: Russian Ground Forces
- Type: Combined arms
- Size: Army
- Part of: Southern Military District
- Garrison/HQ: Sevastopol, Crimea
- Engagements: Russian invasion of Ukraine; Dnieper campaign; Battle of Kostiantynivka

Commanders
- Current commander: Lieutenant General Arkady Marzoyev

The 18th Combined Arms Army (18th CAA) is a field army of the Russian Ground Forces formed from the former 22nd and 40th Army Corps in 2023.

== History ==
The 18th CAA was formed in June 2023 in Crimea as part of the Southern Military District. According to Oleg Marzoev, a reserve officer in the 58th Guards Combined Arms Army, the unit was formed on the basis of the 22nd Army Corps of the Russian Coastal Troops and the newly formed 40th Army Corps. This has come as part of a larger move by the Russian Ministry of Defense to strip ground units away from the Russian Navy, in this case the Black Sea Fleet. As of August 2023, the unit was commanded by Lieutenant General Arkady Marzoev.

Oleg Marzoev claimed that at the time of its formation, the 18th CAA was "one of the largest" units in the Russian Army and that the unit was deployed to southern Kherson Oblast. In August 2023, the United Kingdom's Ministry of Defense assessed that the 18th CAA was deployed there to free up more experienced Russian units, namely the Russian Airborne Forces, to redeploy to the western Zaporizhzhia Oblast sector to defend against the 2023 Ukrainian offensive. Russian sources have reported that the army has engaged Ukrainian forces near Kozachi Laheri in November 2023.

Since July 2024, according to the United Nations commission, commanders and drone units of the 18th CAA have participated in the terror campaign against the civilian population of the Kherson Oblast, known as "Human Safari" and classified by the UN as a crime against humanity.

== Structure ==
- 70th Motor Rifle Division
  - 24th Motor Rifle Regiment
  - 26th Motor Rifle Regiment
  - 28th Motor Rifle Regiment
  - 17th Tank Regiment
  - 81st Self-Propelled Artillery Regiment
- 47th Motor Rifle Division
  - 1152nd Motorized Rifle Regiment (military unit 29542)
  - 1153rd Motorized Rifle Regiment (military unit 29543)
  - 1154th Motorized Rifle Regiment (military unit 29544)
- 126th Guards Coastal Defence Brigade, military unit 12676 (Perevalne, Crimea)
- 127th Reconnaissance Brigade
- 144th Motor Rifle Brigade
- 74th Artillery Brigade
- 4th Separate NBC Protection Regiment, military unit 86862 (Sevastopol)
- 8th Guards Artillery Regiment, military unit 87714 (Perevalne, Crimea)
- 1096th Separate Anti-Aircraft Missile Regiment, military unit 83576 (Sevastopol)
- Separate Unmanned Systems Regiment
