= 2022 attack on Nova Kakhovka =

2022 military action by Ukraine

Coordinates: 46°45′18″N 33°22′30″E

Attack on Nova Kakhovka
- Part of the 2022 Kherson counteroffensive
Date	11 July 2022
Location	Nova Kakhovka, Russian-occupied Kherson Oblast

Belligerents
Armed Forces of Ukraine	Russian Armed Forces

Commanders and leaders
Unknown	(Russia) Artem Nasbulin † (Ukrainian claim)

Casualties and losses
None	Per Ukraine: 52 to 200 soldiers killed Per Russia: 7 soldiers and civilians killed ~70 soldiers and civilians wounded

On 11 July 2022, Ukrainian forces launched a missile attack on the Russian-occupied city of Nova Kakhovka during the Russian invasion of Ukraine. Russia said that Ukraine used HIMARS missiles for the operation, having recently acquired them from the United States.

== Events ==
Targets in the city were hit with large explosions, destroying an ammunitions depot. Videos showed an "immense fireball" rising out of the target.

Ukraine claimed that between 52 and 200 Russian soldiers were killed, including 12 officers, including 22nd Army Corps Major General Artem Nasbulin. The Southern Military command of the Ukrainian Armed Forces said that "Based on the results of our rocket and artillery units, the enemy lost 52 soldiers, an Msta-B howitzer, a mortar, and seven armoured and other vehicles, as well as an ammunition depot in Nova Kakhovka."

Russian officials and state news agencies said that at least seven people had been killed and around 70 wounded, including civilians, and that widespread civilian properties, including a market, a pharmacy and church, warehouses, and houses had been damaged. A pro-Russian official in the governing Kakhovka District military-civilian administration said that several people were still trapped under the buildings' ruins. These claims have not yet been independently verified. Ukrainian spokesman Serhii Khlan said that reports that the attack had damaged hospitals and residential areas were part of Russian propaganda and that many civilians in the town were happy at the idea of the Ukrainian forces being closer to the city.

== See also ==
- 2022 Kherson counteroffensive
- Destruction of the Kakhovka Dam
