= 40th Army Corps (Russian Federation) =

- 40-й армейский корпус
- Active: May 2023 – August 2023
- Country: Russian Federation
- Branch: Russian Ground Forces
- Type: Operational Formation
- Size: Army Corps
- Part of: 18th Combined Arms Army
- Engagements: Russo-Ukrainian War (2022–present); 2023 Ukrainian counteroffensive

The 40th Army Corps (Russian: 40-й армейский корпус, romanized: 40-y Armeyskiy Korpus) was a tactical formation of the Russian Armed Forces formed in 2023 as part of the Southern Military District.

== History ==
The unit was formed in May 2023 and deployed to southern Ukraine against the Ukrainian counteroffensive, where it was merged with the 22nd Army Corps to form the 18th Combined Arms Army and now works under the 18th CAA.

== Formation ==
The corps was formed in Kabardino-Balkaria district.

== Structure ==
- 144th Motor Rifle Brigade
- 47th Motor Rifle Division

== Assignments ==
- 2023–present; 2022 Russian invasion of Ukraine
