= 22nd Army Corps (Russian Federation) =

Russian Coastal Troops formation

- 22-й армейский корпус
- Active: 2017
- Country: Russian Federation
- Branch: Russian Navy
- Type: Combined arms
- Part of: 18th Combined Arms Army
- Corps HQ: Simferopol
- Engagements: Russo-Ukrainian War

The 22nd Army Corps (Russian: 22-й армейский корпус, romanized: 22-y Armeyskiy Korpus-в/ч 73954) was a corps of the coastal defence troops of the Black Sea Fleet of the Russian Navy. Formed in 2017 after the annexation of Crimea by the Russian Federation, the corps is headquartered in Simferopol and controls units based in Crimea.

In February and March 2022, the corps played a leading role in the invasion of Ukraine, operating in Southern Ukraine.

In the summer of 2023, the corps was merged with the 40th Army Corps to form the 18th Combined Arms Army and now works under the 18th CAA.

== History ==
The 22nd Army Corps was formed on 1 December 2016, after the annexation of the Crimea by Russia. The corps includes units of the coastal troops of the Black Sea Fleet, and is ultimately part of the Southern Military District.

The 126th Coastal Defence Brigade had been activated from a previous Ukrainian formation in December 2014 and joined the corps.

In December 2018, the corps was presented with colours after distinguishing itself on combat missions.

General Major Denis Lyamin was reported as the corps commander in June 2021. From February 2022 Lyamin was one of the commanders of the invasion of Ukraine from Crimea; he was declared a war criminal by Ukraine.

General Major Arkady Marzoev was reported as taking over command of the corps in November 2021, and was promoted to lieutenant general on 7 December 2022.

Ammunition depots of the 22nd Army Corps were struck on 14 May 2022 in the 2022 Chornobaivka attacks during the Russian invasion of Ukraine.

In 2023, the unit took part in the Ukrainian counteroffensive, during which it was merged with the newly created 40th Army Corps and reformed into the 18th Combined Arms Army.

== Formations and units ==
Formations and units of the corps included:

- 22nd Army Corps, HQ in Simferopol
  - 127th Reconnaissance Brigade (в/ч 67606), Sevastopol
  - 126th Guards Coastal Defence Brigade, (в/ч 12676) Perevalnoe. Reported equipped as mechanized infantry brigade, including T-72B3 main battle tanks.
  - 8th Artillery Regiment (в/ч 87714)
  - 15th Coastal Missile Brigade (9K720 Iskander)
  - 1096th Anti-Aircraft Missile Regiment
  - 4th CBRN Protection Regiment

== Assignments ==
- 2017–present; Southern Military District — Coastal Defence Troops

== Commanders ==
- Lieutenant General Andrei Vladimirovich Kolotovkin (February 2017 – December 2018)
- Lieutenant General Konstantin Georgievich Kastornov (December 2018 – November 2020)
- Major General Denis Igorevich Lyamin (November 2020 – November 2021)
- Major General Arkady Marzoev (November 2021 – present, promoted to lieutenant general 7 December 2022)

== Footnotes ==
- Harris, Catherine; Kagan, Frederick W. (2018). Russia's Military Posture: Ground Forces Order of Battle (PDF). Institute for the Study of War. Archived (PDF) from the original on 25 October 2020.
