= 126th Coastal Defence Brigade =

Russian Coastal Troops formation

126th Guards Coastal Defence Brigade
- Great emblem of the Brigade
- Active: December 1, 2014 – present
- Country: Russia
- Role: Coastal Troops
- Size: ~2000 (2017)
- Part of: 18th Combined Arms Army, Black Sea Fleet
- Garrison/HQ: Perevalne, Republic of Crimea
- Equipment: T-72 main battle tank
- Engagements: Russian invasion of Ukraine (2022); Southern Ukraine campaign; Battle of Voznesensk; 2022 Kherson counteroffensive; Dnieper campaign (2022–present)

Commanders
- Current commander: Lieutenant Colonel; Gasparyan Andranik Sarkisovich

The 126th Guards Coastal Defense Brigade is a formation of the Coastal Defence Troops of the Russian Navy. Its Military Unit Number is 12676. The brigade is part of the 22nd Army Corps, Coastal Forces of the Russian Black Sea Fleet. The brigade's garrison is located in Perevalne, in the Simferopol region of the Russian-occupied Republic of Crimea.

The brigade traces its lineage to the 126th Rifle Division of the Second World War, which was active with its headquarters at Simferopol for many years after the war as the 126th Motor Rifle Division. It was disbanded in 1996. After the annexation of Crimea the Russian Government reformed a unit, using one of the old division's barracks, that inherited the lineage of the division.

== History ==
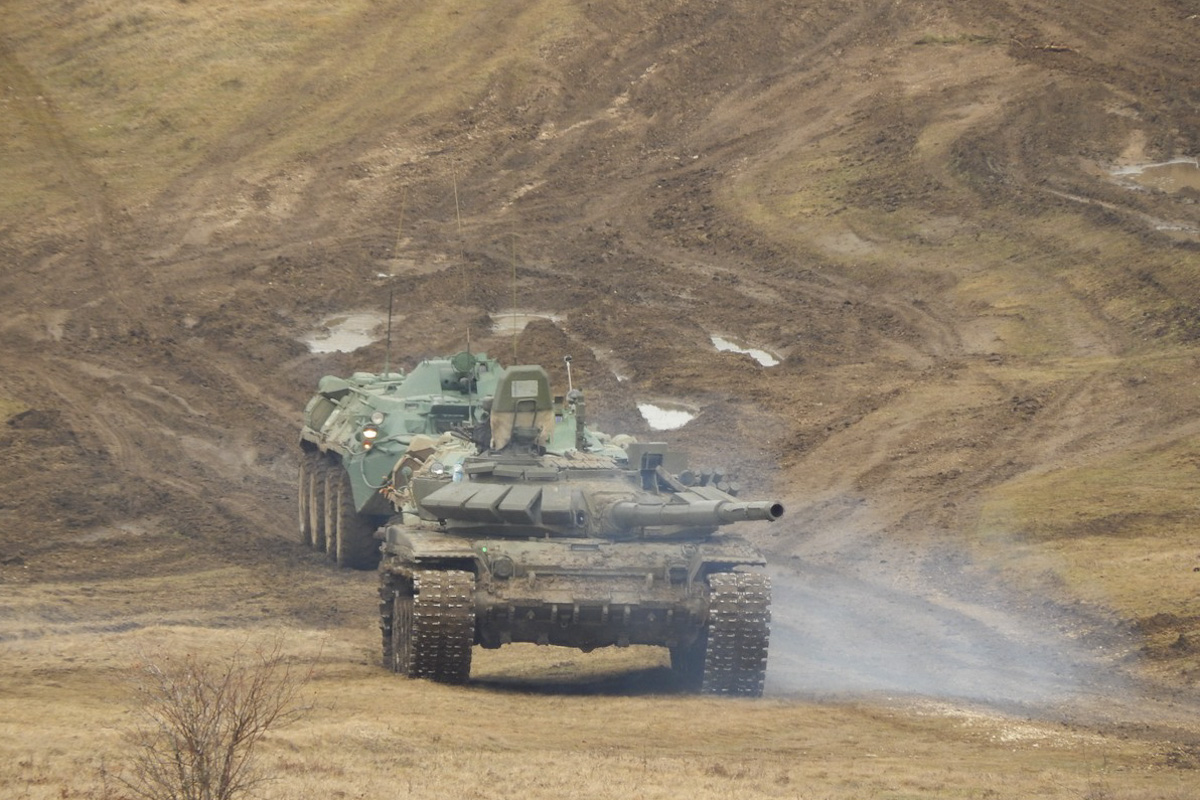
Armoured vehicles of the 126th Coastal Defence Brigade during a company tactical exercise (RTU) at one of the combat training ranges in Crimea

The 126th Brigade was formed on the basis of the 36th Separate Coastal Defense Brigade of the Ukrainian Navy, military unit A2320, which was formed from units of the 32nd Army Corps in 2003. In early 2014, the brigade's barracks in Crimea were surrounded for several weeks by masked Russian special forces soldiers during the annexation of Crimea by the Russian Federation. On March 21, 2014, servicemen loyal to their oaths to Ukraine were allowed to leave Crimea for unoccupied Ukraine; the remainder were given the option of quitting or renouncing their oaths to Ukraine and swearing a new oath to the Russian Federation. According to Colonel S. I. Storozhenko, the brigade commander, 199 servicemen, of 1,200, left and 300 quit; the remainder swore allegiance to the Russian Federation. Thereafter, it was reported that the brigade and its commander entered the Armed Forces of the Russian Federation as a separate coastal defense brigade of the Black Sea Fleet. On December 1, 2014, the 126th Separate Coastal Defence Brigade was formed on the basis of this formation.

The number was chosen to commemorate the Soviet 126th Rifle Division, which took part in the Crimean offensive during World War II. The current brigade in Russian service inherited the awards, Fighting Way, titles and military glory of that division. The division became the 126th Motor Rifle Division in December 1964 and for decades, its 257th Guards Tank Regiment was located at Perevalne. It was finally disbanded in 1996.

=== Battle of Voznesensk ===
On March 2, 2022, as part of the Southern Ukraine offensive during the 2022 Russian invasion of Ukraine, units of the brigade advanced from Mykolaiv towards the city of Voznesensk, in an attempt to find a crossing over the Southern Bug river. The column consisted of 400 men and 43 vehicles. The unit failed to find a crossing due to preparations taken by the city's mayor and civilian population; there were numerous roadblocks, a bridge over the Mertvovod River was destroyed, and the shoreline of the river had been dug out. So, Russian vehicles could not ford it.

The defense of the city was mostly mustered by the Ukrainian 80th Air Assault Brigade, local civilian militias, Territorial Defense Forces, and Ukrainian Special Operations Forces. The Ukrainian paratroopers said that they rendered the 126th's artillery ineffective, and the 126th was forced to withdraw from the city after sustaining heavy losses. Ukrainian officers estimated that a total of 100 Russian soldiers died, 10 were captured, and 30 of the unit's 43 armoured vehicles were either destroyed or abandoned in one day; Ukrainian forces were able to salvage 15 of these into working order.

On March 28, 2022, the brigade was awarded the Guards status.

By 19 April 2022, the Ukrainians claimed that the brigade had suffered 75% casualties during the invasion so far.

=== 2022 Kherson counteroffensive ===
On October 15, 2022, the Institute for the Study of War wrote in their daily "Russian Offensive Campaign Assessment":

"A video posted to social media on October 13 shows servicemen of the 126th Coastal Defence Brigade of the Black Sea Fleet in an unspecified location in Kherson Oblast complaining that they have been fighting in the area since the beginning of the war without breaks or troop rotation. The servicemen asserted that they are being "crushed" by Ukrainian forces and emphasized that they have one BTR (armored personnel carrier) for 80 people, which is greatly restricting their maneuverability. After the video circulated, a Wagner Group–affiliated Telegram channel announced on October 14 that Wagner Group leadership decided to transfer four off-road vehicles to the 126th Coastal Defence Battalion [sic: Brigade] in support of their efforts to hold the frontline in Kherson Oblast.

=== Ostriv Velykyi Potomkin ===
Since at least November 2022, the 126th brigade has been stationed on Ostriv Velykyi Potomkin, the scene of continued skirmishes, as part of the 2022–2023 Dnieper campaign. Since the liberation of Kherson, the island has been re-occupied several times. It had initially been liberated by Ukrainian forces on December 7 but was re-occupied by Russian forces on December 9. Ukrainian and Russian forces both maintain a presence on the island and have contested the island since January 2, 2023. The 126th brigade claimed to have repelled an assault on March 7, while Ukrainian forces claimed to have killed 13 Russians and destroyed 6 armored vehicles and a tank during an air strike on 16 April. On August 25, 2023, Ukraine attacked the brigade in Perevalne, Crimea.

=== Alleged involvement in the Oleshky humanitarian crisis ===
According to Ukrainian investigative news outlet Slidstvo.Info, the 126th Coastal Defence Brigade, alongside the 331st Guards Parachute Regiment of the 98th Guards Airborne Division are involved in the ongoing humanitarian crisis in the city of Oleshky. Both units are alleged to be involved in Russia's ongoing effort to prevent humanitarian organizations from providing aid to the Russian occupied territories of Ukraine.
