= Blockade of Oleshky =

Russian war crime during the invasion of Ukraine

Location map of Oleshky in Ukraine

Following the Russian invasion of Ukraine, the city of Oleshky, located in the Russian-occupied part of Kherson Oblast in Ukraine, has been experiencing a worsening food crisis, as placement of land mines and drone attacks have disrupted supplies of food and medicine. The situation has been exacerbated by the fact, that only people who agreed to receive Russian citizenship have reportedly been qualified as eligible to receive aid from the occupying authorities. As a result, the city's population has decreased from approximately 25,000 before the invasion to only 2,000 as of 2026. Ukrainian officials have described the situation in the city and surrounding settlements as a humanitarian blockade, with witnesses making parallels with the Holodomor.

On 23 October 2026, it was announced a temporary ceasefire was brokered for Oleshky with the help of the United States. The temporary ceasefire would allow humanitarian aid, such as food and medicine, be given to residents to Oleshky, and residents were also given the option to leave if they wished. The ceasefire took effect four days later, on 27 October, and lasted 6 days until ending on 1 November 2026.

== Background ==
On 24 February 2022, Oleshky was occupied by Russian forces in the 2022 Russian invasion of Ukraine. 7 months later, Russian forces withdrew from Kherson city and the part of the region north of the Dnipro river in November 2022. As a result, the city found itself situated between the Dnipro floodplains, which are under Ukrainian fire control, and Russian forces positioned beyond the city on the opposite side.

== Blockade and food crisis ==
Flooding in Oleshky following the destruction of Kakhovka Dam in 2023

According to the head of Oleshky military administration Tetiana Hasanenko, communication with local inhabitants has been complicated due to disruption of communications and electricity supplies. Centralized water supplies have also been disrupted following the destruction of the Kakhovka Dam. Additionally, numerous cases of robbery, torture and murder by Russian servicemen arriving to the city during troop rotation have been registered. On 6 December 2024, a drone attack on a line of civilians queuing for humanitarian aid led to numerous casualties. Civilians in need of medical aid had been systematically denied from being accepted at the local hospital, as it only served Russian citizens. According to a local journalist, Russian troops have been purposefully using local civilians as human shields, refusing to evacuate them in order to prevent Ukrainian military strikes against the area.

On 15 March 2025, Ukrainian forces destroyed a strategically important bridge near Oleshky, preventing Russian troops from expanding their control over the Dnipro estuary islands. In the aftermath, only one access road to the city remained intact, but at least three vehicles travelling over it were destroyed by land mines. Additionally, a local merchant transporting pension money and bread from Skadovsk was shot dead and robbed, further disrupting supplies to the city. As a result, starting from December 2025 Oleshky has experienced a severe food crisis. The situation was made even more difficult due to the lack of medicine. Russian administration in occupied territories provided support only to those inhabitants, who agreed to accept Russian citizenship. As of September 2026, there have reportedly been no supplies of food into the area of Oleshky for over three months. This situation has forced the remaining inhabitants to rely on self-grown food and even resort to hunting birds and wild animals.

== Effects and reactions ==
As of 2026, the population of Oleshky had declined to approximately 2,000 residents, most of them elderly people and their caregivers, as well as men who remained in the city for fear of failing the filtration procedures at Russian checkpoints. Between February and mid-April 2026, the Ombudsman in Ukraine received 119 appeals from inhabitants of Oleshky, reporting about a critical humanitarian situation in the city. A major part of the population has been forced to hide in basements due to constant bombardment, and leaving the area has been made practically impossible due to the installation of roadblocks and introduction of filtration measures by the occupiers. According to local head of regional administration Oleksandr Prokudin, numerous inhabitants of the city have died from starvation and disease due to the humanitarian blockade created by the Russian military. Ukrainian authorities have appealed to the International Red Cross in order to promote the creation of a humanitarian corridor. However, local Russian-installed authorities have refused to acknowledge the existence of a crisis, and refused to perform evacuation of affected civilians.

According to Ukraine's human rights commissioner Dmytro Lubinets, Ukraine has developed procedures for an evacuation mission from Oleshky, including a local ceasefire, with the International Committee of Red Cross expressing its willingness to participate. However, Russia has reportedly still not confirmed its readiness to allow the mission to proceed. According to Lubinets, 358 persons have been in need of urgent evacuation from the area, with the total number of affected reaching up to 6,000, including 200 children. Some residents have attempted to escape on their own, risking to become victims of land mines and drone strikes.

On 20 September 2026 the All-Ukrainian Council of Churches and Religious Organizations appealed to Pope Leo XIV, World Council of Churches and the World Evangelical Congregational Fellowship to help in preventing deaths of civilians in Oleshky from starvation, and called for United Nations members and International Red Cross to support a humanitarian mission in order to evacuate local inhabitants into Ukrainian-controlled territory. On 23 September Ukraine's foreign minister Andrii Sybiha mentioned the situation in Oleshky in his speech before the United Nations General Assembly, blaming Russia of causing famine in the city and calling for the establishment of a humanitarian corridor.

Several packages of humanitarian aid were delivered by Ukrainian forces with the help of drones. According to regional authorities, between March and September 2026 around 4 tons of products had been delivered to inhabitants of Oleshky by Ukrainian forces. Some locals who gained access to help from the Ukrainian side of the front have reportedly been detained by Russians, with confiscated products being resold by the occupiers.

== Ceasefire and evacuation of civilians ==
On 23 October 2026, the First Lady of the United States, Melania Trump, was reported to have secured a ceasefire in Oleshky, which would begin on 27 October 2026. Melania Trump was said to have worked with a representative to talk with both the Ukrainians and Russians over the city. According to David Arakhamia, a Ukrainian negotiator, Pope Leo XIV was also involved in the talks. The ceasefire agreed to, according to the White House, would temporarily stop all military action in Oleshky to allow humanitarian aid and ensure that civilians would be evacuated through a designated safe passageway.

After the start of the ceasefire on 27 October, mine-clearing operations began, and local residents began filling out forms for contact, including those who planned to leave Oleshky. One Russian sapper and another person were killed during the demining prior to the convoy. After this, an aid convoy of 25 buses, ambulances, trucks, and other vehicles began to arrive in the city with food and medicine. Residents who wanted to leave were given the option to either go to Ukraine or Russia. If they chose to go with the Ukrainian convoy, they would go through Crimea to the Russian city of Anapa before then flying to Gomel in Belarus, and eventually they would then cross the border into northern Ukraine to the city of Chernihiv. According to a lawyer from the Save Ukraine Foundation, the reason the Ukrainians chose not to go through with the simpler route of crossing the Dnieper when evacuating was that it would likely be very dangerous. According to The Guardian, it was estimated in earlier reports that around 500 would choose this option of the 2,000 residents that were believed to remain in Oleshky. If they chose to go with Russia, according to Yana Lantratova, the lead representative on the Russian side, they would go by bus to Russia.

One volunteer, Ksenia Arkhipova, told the Associated Press that Russian military personnel were applying pressure on local residents to evacuate to Russia, and not Ukraine, and that they were checking empty houses and moving into them. During the initial evacuation, Melania Trump said on social media that more than 750 residents were evacuated. According to Ukrainian news sources, of the buses, 17 went to Ukraine. The evacuees who chose to go with Ukraine successfully reached the Ukrainian border on 31 October, with volunteers and the Red Cross, Doctors Without Borders, and World Central Kitchen greeting them. Those who chose to go with Russia were taken to a temporary shelter in Simferopol in Crimea. According to one civilian, as reported by Ukraine's human rights ombudsman, Dmytro Lubinets, a lot of people chose to stay of their own choice. Some sources attributed this specifically to older people.

Lubinets was responsible for coordinating the operation with his Russian counterpart, Lantratova, after they departed from Armiansk in Crimea together. Lubinets became the first Ukrainian official to visit Russian-occupied Ukraine since the start of the war when he visited Oleshky.

The ceasefire ended after 6 days on 1 November 2026. Ukrainian officials said they had offered to extend the ceasefire, but Russia refused it.

The Moscow Times reported that following a post describing significantly more Oleshky residents choosing to evacuate to Ukrainian territory rather than Russia, a popular pro-war Russian milblogger, Vladimir Romanov, had gone dark online and his whereabouts had become unknown. Yana Lantratova, Russia's Human Rights Commissioner, also acknowledged that many buses prepared by Russia to evacuate civilians returned empty.

== Responsibility ==
On 28 September 2026, Ukrainian investigative news outlet Slidstvo.Info identified two Russian units that may be involved in the blockade. According to Slidstvo.Info, the 126th Coastal Defence Brigade and the 331st Guards Parachute Regiment of the 98th Guards Airborne Division are both deployed in the Oleshky area of Russian occupied Kherson Oblast and may be involved in preventing humanitarian aid from reaching the city.

== See also ==
- List of military engagements during the Russo-Ukrainian war (2022–present)
