= 331st Guards Airborne Regiment =

331st Guards Airborne Regiment (1946–present) 331st Guards Rifle Regiment (1944–1946)
- Russian: 331-й гвардейский парашютно-десантный Костромской полк
- 331st Guards Airborne Regiment shoulder sleeve insignia
- Active: 1944–present
- Country: Soviet Union; Russia
- Branch: Russian Airborne Forces
- Size: Regiment; ~2000 servicemen with ~200 vehicles
- Part of: 98th Guards Airborne Division
- Garrison/HQ: Kostroma; MUN 71211
- Engagements: First Chechen War Second Chechen War; Russo–Georgian War; Russo-Ukrainian War: War in Donbas; Battle of Ilovaisk; Russian invasion of Ukraine

The 331st Guards Airborne Regiment is a formation of the Russian Airborne Troops. The regiment, a part of the 98th Guards Airborne Division, is considered to be one of Russia's elite units.

== History ==
=== Soviet era ===
The regiment was formed in 1946 at Kostroma from the 331st Guards Rifle Regiment. It was part of the 105th Guards Vienna Airborne Division. In 1960 it was transferred to the 106th Guards Airborne Division. Between 1988 and 1990 the regiment participated in peacekeeping duties in the Caucasus.

=== 1990s ===
In 1992 the regiment was sent to Yugoslavia. In August 1993 it became part of the 98th Guards Airborne Division and then fought in the First Chechen War. In 1999 the regiment was sent to Kosovo. Afterwards it fought in the Second Chechen War.

=== War in Donbas ===
In 2014–2016 the regiment participated in the war in Donbas.

==== Battle of Ilovaisk ====
In August 2014 the unit fought in the Battle of Ilovaisk. On 24 August, around 12:15 AM, a column of BMD-2s of the regiment was hit by a Ukrainian anti-tank squad of the 51st Mechanized Brigade near Kuteinykove village, 13 km West of Amvrosiivka town. Two BMD-2s were destroyed.

The paratroopers left their vehicles and took cover in nearby trees. Several hours later, around 5 PM, they left their cover and were captured by the reconnaissance group of the 51st Mechanized Brigade near Dzerkalne village, the Ukrainian tactical group's field headquarters. Ten paratroopers were captured.

The Russian military stated that the captured paratroopers had crossed the border "by accident". During a briefing held on 5 August 2015, the Ukrainian General Military Prosecutor revealed that the captured paratroopers were exchanged between 29 and 30 August 2014 for 200 Ukrainian soldiers and civilians detained by Russia and pro-Russian forces.

Between 29 and 31 August the regiment's paratroopers guarded Ukrainian prisoners captured in the Ilovaisk pocket after the failed Ukrainian breakthrough attempt near Ilovaisk. After the battle, the regiment was held responsible by Ukrainians for killing hundreds of retreating Ukrainian soldiers, in breach of a ceasefire agreement.

Paratroopers of the 331st Airborne Regiment were spotted in other regions of Ukraine occupied by pro-Russian forces: in Stanitsa-Luhanska village in March 2015, and in Donetsk in August 2016.

=== Russo-Ukrainian War ===
==== Russian invasion of Ukraine from 2022 ====
The regiment participated in the Russian invasion of Ukraine that started in February 2022. Regimental commander Colonel Sergey Sukharev was reported killed in action on 17 March 2022. As of 2 April 2022, the BBC had verified the deaths of 39 soldiers from the regiment, but noted that "since none of those fatalities is more recent than the 13 March, it can be supposed that dozens more will emerge in the coming weeks". On 29 June 2022, the BBC reported that the death toll for the Regiment had been verified by local Russian media as 80 since the war began, a higher figure than the 56 soldiers that the Regiment lost during the decade long war in Afghanistan. BBC Newsnight's Mark Urban reported on 29 June 2022 that the actual figure of dead was likely to be far higher than the 80 reported, estimating that the total casualties—dead, missing in action, captured, and seriously wounded—likely totalled 500, half the pre-war strength of the regiment.

Urban reported in April 2023 that the confirmed dead had reached 94, but that "The actual number of 331st's dead is probably much higher", with several hundred casualties. Urban estimated that the regiment might number no more than 300-400 at the front, surviving as small detachments able to spearhead certain missions, possibly with just three airborne infantry combat vehicles designated as BMD-2 (during the parachute landing, these vehicles are eject from the transport planes with the complete crew inside the vehicle). Compiling information involved the BBC checking accounts on V'Kontakte—the Russian "Facebook"—and local media reporting, then cross-referencing with satellite and Google Street View images. For example, a cluster of death announcements on Kostroma social media in February indicated that elements of the 331st had been engaged in Kreminna.

According to Ukrainian investigative news outlet Slidstvo.Info, 331st Guards Parachute Regiment, alongside the 126th Coastal Defence Brigade, are involved in the ongoing humanitarian crisis in the city of Oleshky. Both units are alleged to be involved in Russia's ongoing effort to prevent humanitarian organizations from providing aid to the Russian occupied territories of Ukraine.

== Commanders ==
The following officers commanded this unit:

- Guard Colonel Yevgeny Nikolayevich Podkolzin (1973)
- Guard Lieutenant Colonel Pavel Vasilyevich Korolev (1976)
- Alexander Ivanovich Lebed (1985-1986)
- Guard Colonel Alexander Ivanovich Lentsov (1990-1993)
- Guard Colonel Nikolai Petrovich Mayorov (1997-2000) ( Hero of the Russian Federation)
- Guard Colonel Evgeny Alekseevich Ustinov (2000-2002)
- Guard Colonel Viktor Igorevich Gunaza (2011-2014)
- Guard Colonel Vladimir Vyacheslavovich Seliverstov (2018-2019) ( Hero of the Russian Federation)
- Guard Colonel Oleg Lvovich Shmelev (2019-2021)
- Guard Colonel Sergey Vladimirovich Sukharev (2021-2022) (posthumously: Hero of the Russian Federation), killed during March 2022 Russian invasion of Ukraine
