= Andrei Sokolov (Latvian chess player) =

Latvian chess player (born 1972)

Personal information
- Born: Andrei Yuryevich Sokolov; 23 February 1972 (age 54)

Chess career
- Country: Soviet Union; Latvia
- Title: International Master (1992)
- FIDE rating: 2516 (November 2026)
- Peak rating: 2532 (January 2018)

Andrei Yuryevich Sokolov (Russian: Андрей Юрьевич Соколов, Latvian: Andrejs Sokolovs; born 23 February 1972) is a Soviet/Latvian chess player. He was awarded the International Master title in 1992.

== Biography ==
In the late 1980s and early 1990s, Andrei Sokolov was one of the best chess players in Latvia. He regularly participated in the Latvian Chess Championship. He received 2nd place in 1990 (won Edvīns Ķeņģis) and in 1994 (won Valerij Zhuravliov). Andrei Sokolov played for Latvia in Chess Olympiads:

- In 1994, at reserve board in the 31st Chess Olympiad in Moscow (+1 −1 =6);
- In 1996, at fourth board in the 32nd Chess Olympiad in Yerevan (+1 −1 =6).

Andrei Sokolov played for Latvia in European Team Chess Championship:

- In 1992, at fourth board in Debrecen (+0 −1 =6);

Since 2002, Sokolov rarely participated in serious chess tournaments, but kept place in the top ten players in Latvia according to the FIDE rating. He currently lives in Veliky Novgorod and plays in fast chess tournaments. In 2013, Sokolov won the Open Championship of Novgorod Oblast in rapid and blitz chess.
