= 70th Motor Rifle Division =

- 70-я мотострелковая дивизия
- Sleeve patch
- Active: September 2023–present
- Country: Russia
- Branch: Russian Ground Forces
- Type: Mechanized infantry
- Size: Division
- Part of: 18th Combined Arms Army
- Engagements: Russo-Ukrainian War: Battle of Krynky; Battle of Kostiantynivka

The 70th Motor Rifle Division (Russian: 70-я мотострелковая дивизия) is a tactical formation of the Ground Forces of the Russian Armed Forces. It is part of the 18th Combined Arms Army.

== History ==
The 70th Motor Rifle Division was created in 2023 and became part of the 18th Combined Arms Army. The division includes the 24th, 26th, and 28th motor rifle regiments and the 17th tank regiment.

In September 2023, the division was transferred to the left bank of the Dnieper. Shortly before the landing of Ukrainian marines in Krynky in mid-October 2023, the division's positions were occupied by the 810th Guards Naval Infantry Brigade in early October. The division was later located in the Kherson direction. In the second half of August 2025, the Russian command redeployed the 70th Motor Rifle Division to Bakhmut. In April 2026, the division operated in the Druzhkivka direction near the village of Viroliubivka.

== Structure ==
- 24th Motor Rifle Regiment
- 26th Motor Rifle Regiment
- 28th Motor Rifle Regiment
- 17th Tank Regiment
- 81st Self-Propelled Artillery Regiment
