= Perevalne =

Perevalne Перевальне (Ukrainian) Anğara (Crimean Tatar) Перевальное (Russian)
- Village
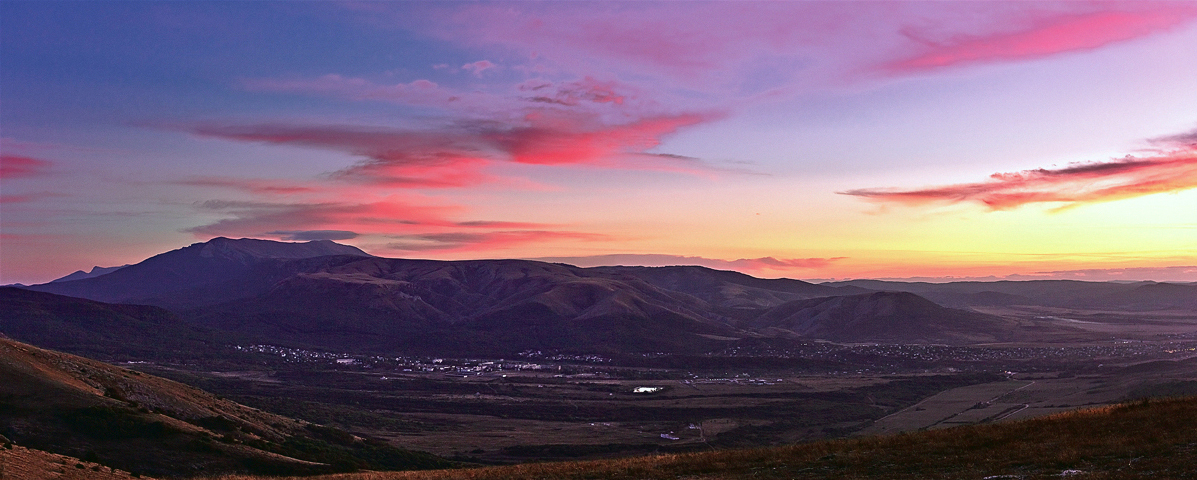
- Chatyr-Dag near Perevalne.

- Location of Perevalne in Crimea
- Coordinates: 44°50′34″N 34°19′21″E
- Country: Ukraine (occupied by Russia)
- Republic: Crimea
- District: Simferopol Raion
- Council: Dobre Village Council
- Elevation: 438 m (1,437 ft)

Population (2001)
  - Total: 3,660
- Time zone: UTC+4 (MSK)
- Postal code: 97578
- Area code: +380 652
- Website: http://rada.gov.ua/

Perevalne (Ukrainian: Перевальне; Russian: Перевальное, romanized: Perevalnoye; Crimean Tatar: Anğara, Ангъара) (until 1945, Angara) is a village in Crimea, a disputed territory recognized by a majority of countries as part of Ukraine but administered by Russia as the Republic of Crimea. The village of Perevalne is administered by the Dobre Village Council, which in turn is subordinate to Crimea's Simferopol Raion (district) authorities.

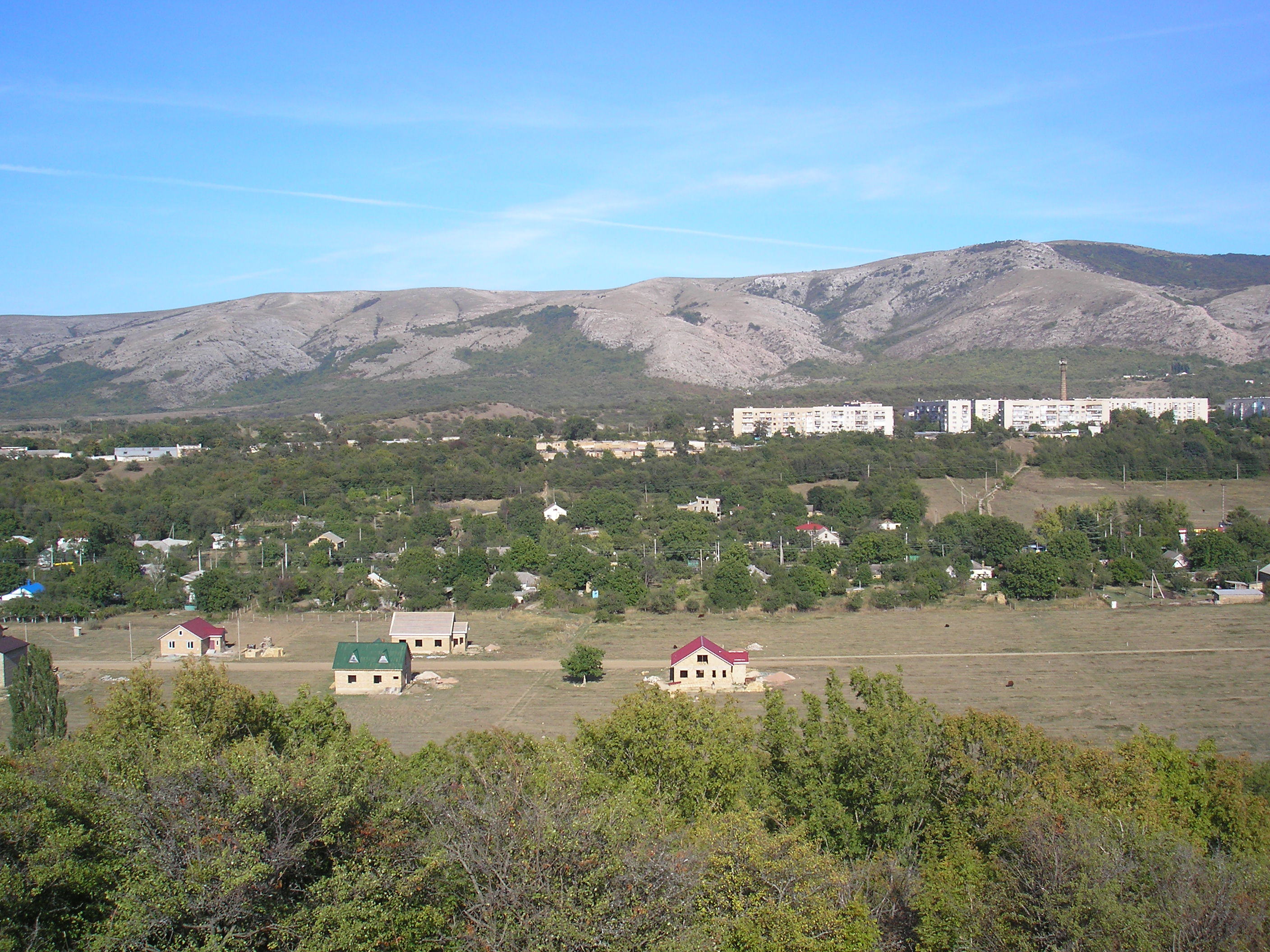
Perevalne village and a garrison

According to the 2001 Ukrainian census, its population was 3,660. The village is located in the middle of the Crimean Mountains, next to the Chatyr-Dag massif. The Simferopol—Alushta—Yalta highway runs through the village, as well as the Crimean Trolleybus line, which has a stop in the settlement.

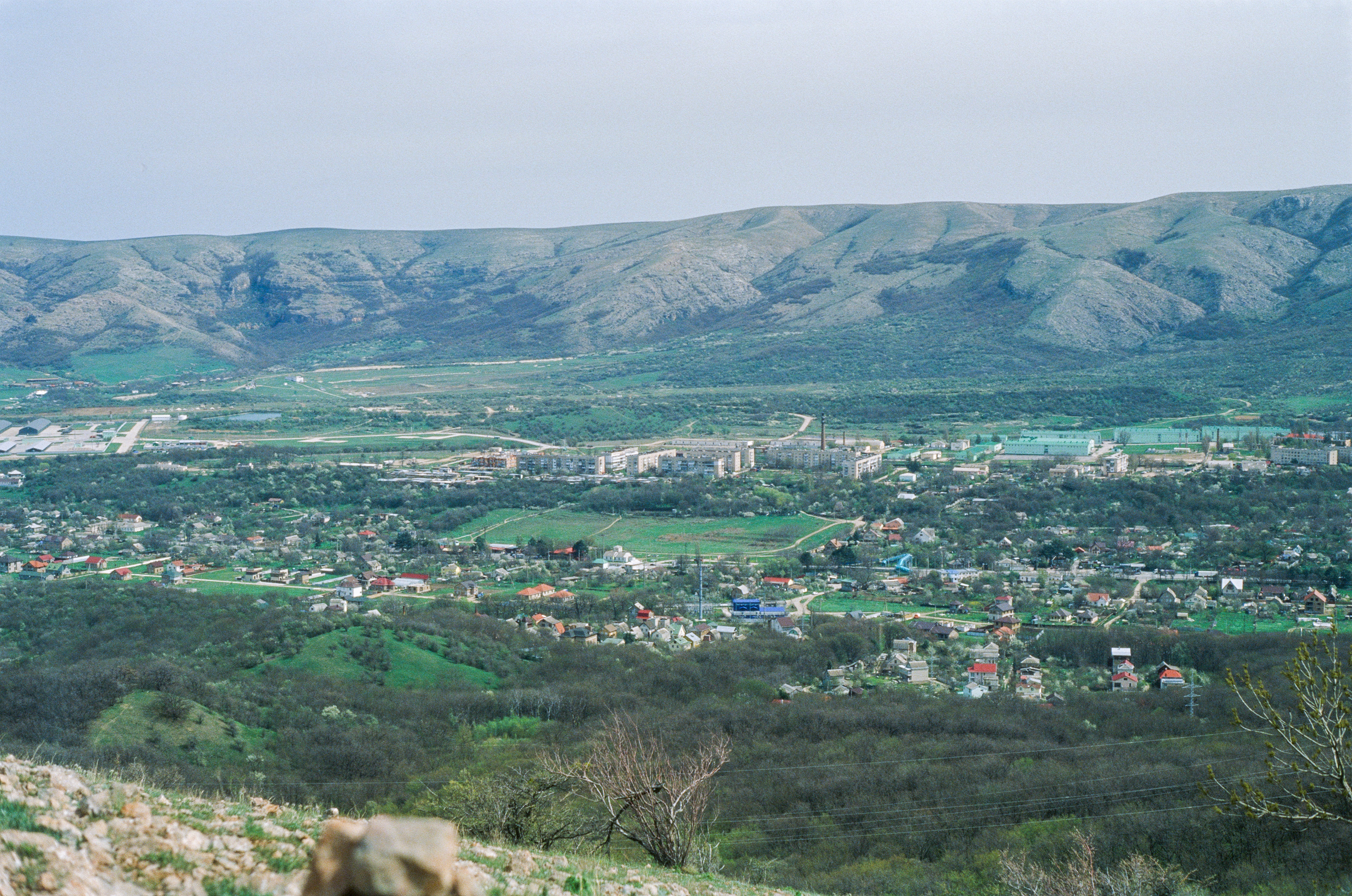
View to Perevalnoye village to east direction (2021)

There is a garrison (воинская часть A-2320) in Perevalne. There's also a former Soviet training center for special forces. The Ukrainian 36th separate mechanized coastal infantry brigade was located there, and, during the 2014 annexation of Crimea by the Russian Federation, was surrounded by the Russian troops without military rank insignia or cockade.

== Russia-Ukraine war ==
In 2023, several explosions were reported on social media at a military base near Perevalne after one of the war's largest drone attacks allegedly targeting the 126th brigade of the Russian Black Sea Fleet. The attack allegedly caused “...several dozen Russians killed and wounded. Ammunition storage facilities were also damaged. Military equipment was also seriously damaged.” Russian sources denied any casualties or damage. On 16 May 2025, the Ukrainian Armed Forces launched another longe-range strike targeting an ammunition depot near the settlement, which resulted in multiple explosions and a large fire at the site. According to the pro-Ukrainian partisan movement Atesh, the attack destroyed infrastructure belonging to the 126th Coastal Defense Guards Brigade and killed an unspecified number of Russian servicemen, who were on duty at the depot. As the result of the attack, the Russian occupation authorities temporarily closed the M-18 highway, which is connecting Simferopol and Alushta.

== Demographics ==
According to the Ukrainian national census in 2001, Perevalne had a population of 3,660 inhabitants. It is estimated that Russians account for a bit more than half of the local population, roughly one third are ethnic Ukrainians, while Crimean Tatars account for a bit more than 10% of the population. Small Armenian, Belarusian, Moldovan, Greek and Gagauz communities also exist in the town. Russian serves as an interethnic language and is also considered to be the native language of most inhabitants without an ethnic Russian background in the town, with the only exception being the Crimean Tatar community. The exact native language composition was as follows:

First languages in Perevalne
	percent
Russian	73.3%
Ukrainian	13.5%
Crimean Tatar	10.0%
Belarusian	0.2%
Moldovan	0.2%
Armenian	0.2%
Gagauz	0.1%
others	0.6%
