= Andrii Sokolov =

Ukrainian Major General

Andrii Sokolov is a Major General of the Ukrainian Armed Forces, who served as Deputy Commander of Operational Command South during the 2022 Russian invasion of Ukraine. In preparation for the invasion, he worked to train the region's troops, but he had less troops than his defense required, divided into the 59th Yakiv Handziuk Brigade and the 137th Marine Battalion. The troops, around 1,600 in total, were overextended as they moved to defend a large territory from an incoming Russian force of 20,000. When the invasion happened on 24 February 2022, the 59th and 137th were unsuccessful in defending Kherson city during the Battle of Kherson, and he was given as backup two incomplete National Guard battalions to defend Melitopol in the Battle of Melitopol. Both cities were eventually taken by Russia.

== Career ==
A map of Operational Command South's territory

In 2014, Russia annexed Crimea, and a militarized buffer zone was created by Ukraine and Russia between mainland Ukraine and Crimea. Sokolov worked in the military headquarters of the region near the buffer zone, as well as in the city of Kramatorsk. From 2018 to 2019, he was commander of the Ukrainian Armed Forces' Operational Command South, which defends the country's southern region. The command borders Crimea. He was appointed to that position again in the autumn of 2021.

=== Preparations for a Russian invasion ===
Upon returning to command, Sokolov ordered his troops to train for a potential Russian invasion. He came up with two plans for his troops, a "stabilization operation" for peacetime and a defensive plan for if Russia escalated. During peacetime, he was supposed to have two brigades, each with 3–5,000 people, and a battalion of 500 people. During an escalation, he was supposed to receive two brigades from the Territorial Defense Forces. On the eve of the invasion in February 2022, Sokolov only had 1,600 soldiers in his command, compared to 20,000 Russian troops coming from the south. They were a part of the 59th Yakiv Handziuk Brigade and the 137th Marine Battalion. The 137th had been patrolling the southern mainland isthmuses, observing the Russians in Crimea. The 59th was stationed at the Shyrokolanivka training ground near Mykolaiv city; they were supposed to be a second line of defense after the 137th. Sokolov's troops were over-extended and given much larger areas to defend then they were supposed to. As the situation was escalating, the 137th prepared to save civilians by holding practice drills and studying retreat routes. These preparations would be useful, as many civilians would be saved.

On 14 January, Sokolov held a meeting with multiple Ukrainian defense organizations, as well as the heads of the 137th and 59th, discussing the positioning of troops. Later that month, Sokolov moved the 59th closer to the south, at the Olehsky Sands training ground. He then realized the front near Melitopol had no troops, so he put an infantry battalion of the 59th there. A tank company was sent to the area of Zaliznyi Port and Lazurne in Kherson Oblast. On 21 February, the Ukrainians found a plan for one of the soon-to-invade Russian brigades in Crimea, detailing how they would not go first to Mykolaiv, but rather land at Odesa, then capture Bilhorod-Dnistrovskyi in Odesa Oblast and make their way to the Ukrainian-Moldovan border, where they would set up post.

On 23 February, Lieutenant General Serhii Naiev, commander of the Joint Forces of the Armed Forces of Ukraine, informed Sokolov that activity happening near the Crimea buffer zone likely meant an invasion would happen the next day. The 59th Brigade were ordered to form a defensive line 70 to 80 kilometers away from their position by the morning of the 25th. Only some of them started moving towards their positions. Hours before the invasion started, Sokolov and his military command at Melitopol viewed aerial intelligence about the situation in Crimea.

=== Russian invasion of Ukraine ===
The Russian invasion of Ukraine started early into the 24th. After reports of the first Russians entering southern Ukraine came in around 4 to 5 a.m., the southern military command ordered bridges and dams near Crimea to be destroyed. Sokolov later said of the first hours of the invasion: "The first was the attack on almost all places of deployment of our units, command points, starting positions and air defence system command points, and the airbase in Melitopol. Almost all of the military facilities in Kherson and Zaporizhzhia Oblast [were attacked]." Radio communications were cut off between the Ukrainian troops positioned near Crimea and the southern military command, so they communicated via WhatsApp. The Ukrainian soldiers at the front were not very successful in blowing up all the required bridges and dams.

The Russians then began advancing in two fronts, towards Kherson and Melitopol. The 137th lost two thirds of their men, and retreated. The 59th was encircled near the Antonivka bridge, but eventually escaped. The part of the 59th that was sent from Olehsky Sands to Melitopol were stopped on the way to the city, likely running out of fuel. On the afternoon of the 24th, Kherson's 124th Territorial Defence Brigade, which had not previously given a mobilization order, was allowed to fight. The Operation Command South headquarters were moved from Melitopol to Zaporizhzhia Oblast, and Sokolov was given more reinforcements: two incomplete National Guard battalions and the 110th Territorial Defence Brigade. At night, Sokolov started to move his troops in Vasylivka towards undefended Melitopol. The 110th Brigade were not a part of the move, as they did not have any equipment. The National Guard battalions had some successes, but the city had no organized resistance or defense, so the Russians were able to move in and take the city, the National Guard troops withdrawing. They withdrew back to the area of Vasylivka and Tokmak and then possibly to Kamianske; Sokolov did not remember the exact location when interviewed. Meanwhile, the Russians took control of two key crossings on the Dnipro River: the Antonivka bridge and the Nova Kakhovka dam. The Russian troops then threatened the Ukrainians near Mariupol and in the Joint Forces Operation area.
