= Trudovoye =

Trudovoye is the name of several places in Russia:

== Russia ==
- Trudovoye, Amur Oblast
- Trudovoye, Nizhny Novgorod Oblast
- Trudovoye, Sol-Iletsky District, Orenburg Oblast
- Trudovoye, Tashlinsky District, Orenburg Oblast
- Trudovoye, Primorsky Krai
- Trudovoye, Sakhalin Oblast
- Trudovoye, Saratov Oblast
- Trudovoye, Stavropol Krai
- Trudovoye, Voronezh Oblast

== See also ==
- Trudovoy
- Trudovaya
