= Trudovoy =

Trudovoy (Russian: Трудовой; masculine), Trudovaya (Трудовая; feminine), or Trudovoye (Трудовое; neuter) is the name of several rural localities in Russia:

- Trudovoy, Amur Oblast, a settlement in Trudovoy Rural Settlement of Oktyabrsky District of Amur Oblast
- Trudovoy, Chelyabinsk Oblast, a settlement in Burinsky Selsoviet of Kunashaksky District of Chelyabinsk Oblast
- Trudovoy, Kaliningrad Oblast, a settlement in Turgenevsky Rural Okrug of Polessky District of Kaliningrad Oblast
- Trudovoy, Gulkevichsky District, Krasnodar Krai, a settlement in Kuban Rural Okrug of Gulkevichsky District of Krasnodar Krai
- Trudovoy, Krymsky District, Krasnodar Krai, a khutor in Moldavansky Rural Okrug of Krymsky District of Krasnodar Krai
- Trudovoy, Leningradsky District, Krasnodar Krai, a settlement in Vostochny Rural Okrug of Leningradsky District of Krasnodar Krai
- Trudovoy, Zverevo, Rostov Oblast, a khutor under the administrative jurisdiction of Zverevo Urban Okrug, Rostov Oblast
- Trudovoy, Zimovnikovsky District, Rostov Oblast, a khutor in Kuteynikovskoye Rural Settlement of Zimovnikovsky District of Rostov Oblast
- Trudovoy, Saratov Oblast, a settlement in Balashovsky District of Saratov Oblast
- Trudovoy, Stavropol Krai, a settlement in Baltiysky Selsoviet of Kursky District of Stavropol Krai
- Trudovoy, Republic of Tatarstan, a settlement in Nizhnekamsky District of the Republic of Tatarstan
- Trudovoy, Tomsk Oblast, a settlement in Chainsky District of Tomsk Oblast
- Trudovoy, Tula Oblast, a settlement in Bolshekalmyksky Rural Okrug of Kireyevsky District of Tula Oblast
- Trudovoy, Tver Oblast, a settlement in Vyshnevolotsky District of Tver Oblast
- Trudovoye, Nizhny Novgorod Oblast, a selo in Yelizaryevsky Selsoviet of Diveyevsky District of Nizhny Novgorod Oblast
- Trudovoye, Sol-Iletsky District, Orenburg Oblast, a selo in Trudovoy Selsoviet of Sol-Iletsky District of Orenburg Oblast
- Trudovoye, Tashlinsky District, Orenburg Oblast, a selo in Trudovoy Selsoviet of Tashlinsky District of Orenburg Oblast
- Trudovoye, Primorsky Krai, a settlement under the administrative jurisdiction of Frunzensky City District of the city under krai jurisdiction of Vladivostok, Primorsky Krai
- Trudovoye, Sakhalin Oblast, a selo in Poronaysky District of Sakhalin Oblast
- Trudovoye, Saratov Oblast, a settlement in Yershovsky District of Saratov Oblast
- Trudovoye, Voronezh Oblast, a settlement in Trudovskoye Rural Settlement of Novousmansky District of Voronezh Oblast
- Trudovaya, a settlement in Fedoskinskoye Rural Settlement of Mytishchinsky District of Moscow Oblast
