= Nikolo-Alexandrovka =

Nikolo-Alexandrovka Николо-Александровка
- Selo
- Location within Amur Oblast Location within Russia
- Coordinates: 50°09′N 128°29′E
- Country: Russia
- Region: Amur Oblast
- District: Oktyabrsky District
- Time zone: UTC+9:00

Nikolo-Alexandrovka (Russian: Нико́ло-Алекса́ндровка) is a rural locality (a selo) and the administrative center of Nikolo-Alexandrovsky Selsoviet of Oktyabrsky District, Amur Oblast, Russia. The population was 503 as of 2018. There are 7 streets.

== Geography ==
Nikolo-Alexandrovka is located 56 km (35 mi) southwest of Yekaterinoslavka (the district's administrative centre) by road. Pokrovka is the nearest rural locality.
