= Cheremushki, Russia =

Cheremushki (Russian: Черемушки) or Cheryomushki (Черёмушки) is the name of several inhabited localities in Russia.

Urban localities

- Cheryomushki, Republic of Khakassia, a work settlement under the administrative jurisdiction of the Town of Sayanogorsk in the Republic of Khakassia

Rural localities

- Cheremushki, Amur Oblast, a selo in Mukhinsky Rural Settlement of Oktyabrsky District in Amur Oblast
- Cheryomushki, Bryansk Oblast (or Cheremushki), a settlement in Klyukovensky Rural Administrative Okrug of Navlinsky District in Bryansk Oblast; 52°55′N 34°26′E
- Cheremushki, Chelyabinsk Oblast, a settlement in Lazurnensky Selsoviet of Krasnoarmeysky District in Chelyabinsk Oblast
- Cheremushki, Chuvash Republic, a settlement in Atnarskoye Rural Settlement of Krasnochetaysky District in the Chuvash Republic
- Cheremushki, Irkutsk Oblast, a village in Irkutsky District of Irkutsk Oblast
- Cheremushki, Kemerovo Oblast, a settlement in Shcheglovskaya Rural Territory of Kemerovsky District in Kemerovo Oblast; 55°37′N 85°55′E
- Cheremushki, Krasnoyarsk Krai, a settlement in Cheremushkinsky Selsoviet of Balakhtinsky District in Krasnoyarsk Krai
- Cheremushki, Kurgan Oblast, a selo in Cheremushkinsky Selsoviet of Lebyazhyevsky District in Kurgan Oblast; 55°18′N 66°37′E
- Cheryomushki, Kursk Oblast, a settlement in Lebyazhensky Selsoviet of Kursky District in Kursk Oblast
- Cheremushki, Lipetsk Oblast, a selo in Stebayevsky Selsoviet of Lipetsky District in Lipetsk Oblast; 52°25′N 39°14′E
- Cheremushki, Gorodetsky District, Nizhny Novgorod Oblast, a village in Zinyakovsky Selsoviet of Gorodetsky District in Nizhny Novgorod Oblast
- Cheremushki, Varnavinsky District, Nizhny Novgorod Oblast, a settlement in Voskhodovsky Selsoviet of Varnavinsky District in Nizhny Novgorod Oblast
- Cheremushki, Orenburg Oblast, a settlement in Iskrinsky Selsoviet of Abdulinsky District in Orenburg Oblast
- Cheremushki, Samara Oblast, a village in Klyavlinsky District of Samara Oblast
- Cheremushki, Saratov Oblast, a khutor in Pitersky District of Saratov Oblast
- Cheremushki, Smolensk Oblast, a village in Polyanovskoye Rural Settlement of Vyazemsky District in Smolensk Oblast
- Cheremushki, Tomsk Oblast, a settlement in Chainsky District of Tomsk Oblast
- Cheremushki, Tula Oblast, a village in Rusinskaya Rural Administration of Chernsky District in Tula Oblast
- Cheremushki, Bezhetsky District, Tver Oblast, a village in Porechyevskoye Rural Settlement of Bezhetsky District in Tver Oblast
- Cheremushki, Oleninsky District, Tver Oblast, a settlement in Glazkovskoye Rural Settlement of Oleninsky District in Tver Oblast
- Cheremushki, Staritsky District, Tver Oblast, a village in Stepurinskoye Rural Settlement of Staritsky District in Tver Oblast
- Cheremushki, Tyumen Oblast, a village in Berkutsky Rural Okrug of Yalutorovsky District in Tyumen Oblast
- Cheremushki, Udmurt Republic, a selo in Cheremushkinsky Selsoviet of Mozhginsky District in the Udmurt Republic
- Cheremushki, Ulyanovsk Oblast, a selo in Cheremushkinsky Rural Okrug of Inzensky District in Ulyanovsk Oblast
- Cheremushki, Vologda Oblast, a village in Naumovsky Selsoviet of Verkhovazhsky District in Vologda Oblast
- Cheremushki, Yaroslavl Oblast, a village in Arefinsky Rural Okrug of Rybinsky District in Yaroslavl Oblast
