= Cheremushki, Amur Oblast =

Cheremushki Черёмушки
- Selo
- Location within Amur Oblast Location within Russia
- Coordinates: 50°17′N 128°47′E
- Country: Russia
- Region: Amur Oblast
- District: Oktyabrsky District
- Time zone: UTC+9:00

Cheremushki (Russian: Черёмушки) is a rural locality (a selo) in Mukhinsky Selsoviet of Oktyabrsky District, Amur Oblast, Russia. The population was 114 as of 2018.

== Geography ==
Cheremushki is located 37 km southwest of Yekaterinoslavka (the district's administrative centre) by road. Mukhinsky is the nearest rural locality. Located in the Russian Far East,it is characterized by a continental climate with monsoonal features (bitterly cold, dry winters and warm, wet summers).Its landscape is situated within the fertile, largely cultivated Zeya-Bureya Plain in southern Amur Oblast. Average January temperatures are about -24 degrees celsius in the south, often dropping below -30 degrees celcuis, while summers are around 21 degrees celsuis. The region is known for agricultural production, specifically wheat, soybeans, and sunflowers.
