= Borisoglebka =

Borisoglebka Борисоглебка
- Selo
- Location within Amur Oblast Location within Russia
- Coordinates: 50°02′N 128°36′E
- Country: Russia
- Region: Amur Oblast
- District: Oktyabrsky District
- Time zone: UTC+9:00

Borisoglebka (Russian: Борисоглебка) is a rural locality (a selo) and the administrative center of Borisoglebsky Selsoviet of Oktyabrsky District, Amur Oblast, Russia. The population was 197 as of 2018. There are 5 streets.

== Geography ==
Borisoglebka is located on the right bank of the Dim River, 59 km southwest of Yekaterinoslavka (the district's administrative centre) by road. Ilyinovka is the nearest rural locality.
