= Zaozerny (inhabited locality) =

Zaozerny/Zaozyorny (Russian: Заозерный or Заозёрный; masculine), Zaozernaya/Zaozyornaya (Заозерная or Заозёрная; feminine), or Zaozernoye/Zaozyornoye (Заозерное or Заозёрное; neuter) is the name of several inhabited localities in Russia.

Urban localities

- Zaozyorny, Krasnoyarsk Krai, a town in Rybinsky District of Krasnoyarsk Krai

Rural localities

- Zaozerny, Altai Krai, a settlement in Svetloozersky Selsoviet of Biysky District of Altai Krai; 52°32′N 85°29′E
- Zaozerny, Amur Oblast, a settlement in Trudovoy Rural Settlement of Oktyabrsky District of Amur Oblast
- Zaozerny, Arkhangelsk Oblast, a settlement in Limsky Selsoviet of Nyandomsky District of Arkhangelsk Oblast
- Zaozerny, Republic of Buryatia, a settlement under the administrative jurisdiction of the Town of Gusinoozyorsk in Selenginsky District of the Republic of Buryatia
- Zaozerny, Kopeysk, Chelyabinsk Oblast, a settlement under the administrative jurisdiction of the City of Kopeysk in Chelyabinsk Oblast
- Zaozerny, Bredinsky District, Chelyabinsk Oblast, a settlement in Knyazhensky Selsoviet of Bredinsky District of Chelyabinsk Oblast
- Zaozerny, Uysky District, Chelyabinsk Oblast, a settlement in Sokolovsky Selsoviet of Uysky District of Chelyabinsk Oblast
- Zaozerny, Republic of Karelia, a settlement under the administrative jurisdiction of the town of republic significance of Sortavala in the Republic of Karelia
- Zaozerny, Kemerovo Oblast, a settlement in Proskokovskaya Rural Territory of Yurginsky District of Kemerovo Oblast
- Zaozerny, Tyumen Oblast, a settlement in Pervopesyanovsky Rural Okrug of Ishimsky District of Tyumen Oblast
- Zaozernoye, Krasnoznamensky District, Kaliningrad Oblast, a settlement in Vesnovsky Rural Okrug of Krasnoznamensky District of Kaliningrad Oblast
- Zaozernoye, Ozyorsky District, Kaliningrad Oblast, a settlement in Novostroyevsky Rural Okrug of Ozyorsky District of Kaliningrad Oblast
- Zaozernoye, Khabarovsk Krai, a selo in Khabarovsky District of Khabarovsk Krai
- Zaozernoye, Sakhalin Oblast, a selo in Makarovsky District of Sakhalin Oblast
- Zaozernaya, Kargapolsky District, Kurgan Oblast, a village in Okunevsky Selsoviet of Kargapolsky District of Kurgan Oblast
- Zaozernaya, Vargashinsky District, Kurgan Oblast, a village in Uralsky Selsoviet of Vargashinsky District of Kurgan Oblast
- Zaozernaya, Omsk Oblast, a village in Novokarasuksky Rural Okrug of Krutinsky District of Omsk Oblast
- Zaozernaya, Tyumen Oblast, a village in Yurginsky Rural Okrug of Yurginsky District of Tyumen Oblast
