= Pereyaslovka =

Pereyaslovka Переясловка
- Selo
- Location within Amur Oblast Location within Russia
- Coordinates: 50°24′N 128°47′E
- Country: Russia
- Region: Amur Oblast
- District: Oktyabrsky District
- Time zone: UTC+9:00

Pereyaslovka (Russian: Переясловка) is a rural locality (a selo) and the administrative center of Pereyaslovky Selsoviet of Oktyabrsky District, Amur Oblast, Russia. The population was 57 as of 2018. There are 4 streets.

== Geography ==
Pereyaslovka is located 29 km west of Yekaterinoslavka (the district's administrative centre) by road. Urozhaynoye is the nearest rural locality.
