= Vostochny, Oktyabrsky District, Amur Oblast =

Vostochny Восточный
- Settlement
- Location within Amur Oblast Location within Russia
- Coordinates: 50°21′N 129°07′E
- Country: Russia
- Region: Amur Oblast
- District: Oktyabrsky District
- Time zone: UTC+9:00

Vostochny (Russian: Восточный) is a rural locality (a settlement) and the administrative center of Vostochny Selsoviet of Oktyabrsky District, Amur Oblast, Russia. The population was 1,289 as of 2018. There are 16 streets.

== Geography ==
Vostochny is located 3 km south of Yekaterinoslavka (the district's administrative centre) by road. Yekaterinoslavka is the nearest rural locality.
