= Cheryomushki =

Cheryomushki or Cheremushki may refer to:

- Cheryomushki District, a district of Moscow, Russia
- Cheryomushki constituency, a legislative constituency in Moscow
- Cheryomushki tram, a terminal station of the Moscow tramway network, Moscow, Russia
- Cheremushki, Kyrgyzstan, a village in Nooken District of Jalal-Abad Province in Kyrgyzstan
- Cheremushki, Russia (Cheryomushki), several inhabited localities in Russia
- A colloquial name of Moscow, Cheryomushki, a 1958 operetta by Dmitri Shostakovich
- Original Russian title of the 1962 musical film Cherry Town based on the operetta
- Informal name of the Chita Northwest air base, Russia

== See also ==
- Novye Cheryomushki (disambiguation)
