= Smirnovka =

Smirnovka Смирновка
- Selo
- Location within Amur Oblast Location within Russia
- Coordinates: 50°32′N 128°58′E
- Country: Russia
- Region: Amur Oblast
- District: Oktyabrsky District
- Time zone: UTC+9:00

Smirnovka (Russian: Смирновка) is a rural locality (a selo) in Korolinsky Selsoviet of Oktyabrsky District, Amur Oblast, Russia. The population was 12 as of 2018. There is 1 street.

== Geography ==
Smirnovka is located 27 km north of Yekaterinoslavka (the district's administrative centre) by road. Verkhnebeloye is the nearest rural locality.
