= Troyebratka =

Troyebratka Троебратка
- Station
- Location within Amur Oblast Location within Russia
- Coordinates: 50°15′N 129°16′E
- Country: Russia
- Region: Amur Oblast
- District: Oktyabrsky District
- Time zone: UTC+9:00

Troyebratka (Russian: Троебратка) is a rural locality (a station) in Novomikhaylovsky Selsoviet of Oktyabrsky District, Amur Oblast, Russia. The population was 24 as of 2018.

== Geography ==
Troyebratka is located 19 km southeast of Yekaterinoslavka (the district's administrative centre) by road. Novomikhaylovka is the nearest rural locality.
