= Ilyinovka =

Ilyinovka Ильиновка
- Selo
- Location within Amur Oblast Location within Russia
- Coordinates: 49°58′N 128°32′E
- Country: Russia
- Region: Amur Oblast
- District: Oktyabrsky District
- Time zone: UTC+9:00

Ilyinovka (Russian: Ильиновка) is a rural locality (a selo) in Borisoglebsky Selsoviet of Oktyabrsky District, Amur Oblast, Russia. The population was 184 as of 2018. There are 2 streets.

== Geography ==
Ilyinovka is located on the left bank of the Dim River, 68 km southwest of Yekaterinoslavka (the district's administrative centre) by road. Nizhnyaya Ilyinovka is the nearest rural locality.
