= 38th Separate Guards Motor Rifle Brigade =

Russian Ground Forces formation

328th Rifle Division (1941–1942) 31st Guards Rifle Division (1942–1945) 29th Guards Mechanised Division (1945–1957) 29th Guards Motor Rifle Division (1957–1964) 31st Guards Motor Rifle Division (1964–1978) 21st Guards Tank Division (1978–ca. 2004/06) 21st Guards Motor Rifle Division (ca. 2004/06–2009) 38th Guards Motorized Rifle Brigade (2009–)
- Sleeve insignia of the 38th Separate Guards Motor Rifle Brigade
- Active: 1941–present
- Country: Soviet Union (1941–1991); Russia (1991–present)
- Branch: Red Army (1941–1946); Soviet Army (1946–1992); Russian Ground Forces (1992–present)
- Type: Mechanized infantry
- Size: Brigade
- Part of: 35th Combined Arms Army; Eastern Military District
- Garrison/HQ: Yekaterinoslavka, Amur Oblast
- Nickname: Vitebskaya
- Engagements: World War II; Russo-Ukrainian War
- Decorations: Order of Lenin; Order of the Red Banner; Order of Suvorov 2nd class
- Battle honours: Guards

Commanders
- Notable commanders: Porfiry Gudz; Ivan Burmakov

The 38th Guards Vitebskaya Order of Lenin Red Banner Order of Suvorov Motor Rifle Brigade is a mechanized infantry brigade of the Russian Ground Forces, part of the Eastern Military District. Military Unit в/ч 21720.

The brigade was formed during the 2009 Russian military reforms from the 21st Guards Motor Rifle Division of the Far East Military District, formed from the Red Army 31st Guards Rifle Division, an infantry division of World War II which subsequently became a motor-rifle, a tank division and then back to a motor-rifle division. The division was disbanded in 2009 and its traditions inherited by the 38th Separate Guards Motor Rifle Brigade, formed from at least one of its regiments.

== World War II ==
The division traced its origin to the 328th Rifle Division, which was formed in the Yaroslavl area in August – September 1941. The division initially consisted of the 1103rd, 1105th and 1107th Rifle Regiments and the 889th Artillery Regiment. Colonel P.A. Yeremin (August 1941 – April 1942) took command. On December 7, 1941, the division entered battle in area of the city of Mikhajlov of the Ryazan area. Colonel P. M. Gudz (April – September 1942) held command from April 1942.

As part of the 10th Army, then the 16th Army, the division joined the Western Front, participated in counterattack near Moscow and the winter offensive of 1942, around Zhizdra and Kirov. On 24 May 1942 for its courage and heroism the division became the 31st Guards Rifle Division. The new regimental titles were the 95th, 97th, and 99th Guards Rifle Regiments and the 64th Guards Artillery Regiment. In the summer of 1942 the division fought in the Bryansk area. General-Major A. F. Naumov (October 1942 – February 1943) took command in October 1942.

Colonel, from 17 November 1943, general-major I. K. Shcherbina (February 1943 – July 1944) took command from February 1943. In 1943 as part of the 16th Army (since April, 16th, 1943 – 11th Guards Army) the division attacked the Oryol direction, on 15 August participated in clearing the city of Karachev. It then took part in Operation Bagration and the Gumbinnen Offensive. On 2 July the division was awarded the honorific Vitebsk for skilful actions in Vitebsk–Orsha Offensive, and on 23 July for clearing the city of Molodechno it was awarded the Order of the Red Banner.

In July during the Vilnius Offensive the division skillfully forced the Neman river near the city of Alytus, for which, on 12 August it was awarded the Order of Suvorov, 2nd class. Major General Ivan Burmakov took command of the division in July and remained in command until the end of the war. The division has entered East Prussia on 18 October against stiff German resistance. On 14 November for valour and heroism of soldiers in the invasion of East Prussia the division was awarded the Order of Lenin.

The division participated in the East Prussian Offensive of 1945. During the assault on Koenigsberg, now Kaliningrad, the division distinguished itself breaking the external defensive boundary. The division participated in the rout of the remaining German forces and the taking of the Pilau naval base.

More than 14,000 of its soldiers were awarded decorations and medals during the war, and eleven were awarded the coveted Hero of the Soviet Union.

== Cold War ==
In 1945 31st Guards Rifle Division was reformed as 29th Guards Mechanised Division, with the 94th, 93rd, and 92nd Guards Mechanised Regiments.

On 25 June 1957 29th Guards Mechanised Division was reflagged as the 29th Guards Motor Rifle Division at Kaunas. The division was subordinated to the 10th Army Corps. In June 1960, the division became part of the Baltic Military District. On 19 February 1962, the 626th Separate Equipment Maintenance and Recovery Battalion was activated, along with a missile battalion.

On 1 November 1965 the division became 31st Guards Motor Rifle Division (Russian: 31-я гвардейская мотострелковая Витебская ордена Ленина Краснознамённая ордена Суворова дивизия). In 1968, the 35th Separate Guards Sapper Battalion became a sapper-engineer battalion. It may have been based at Vilnius for a period. In August 1969 31st Guards Motor Rifle Division was relocated from Kaunas in the Lithuanian SSR (Baltic Military District) to Belogorsk, Amur Oblast, of the Far East Military District. The division became part of the 35th Army. In 1972, the chemical defence company was upgraded to the 158th Separate Chemical Defence Battalion.

On 16 May 1977 31st Guards Motor Rifle Division became 21st Guards Tank Division. The 93rd Guards Motor Rifle Regiment became the 111th Guards Tank Regiment and the 94th Guards Motor Rifle Regiment became the 125th Guards Tank Regiment. In 1980, the 389th Separate Motor Transport Battalion became the 1138th Separate Material Supply Battalion.

In 1988 the division's main regiments included:

- Division Headquarters, Belogorsk-11, Amur Oblast
- 2nd Guards Vitebsk Red Banner Orders of Suvorov and Kutuzov Tank Regiment - Yekaterinoslavka, Amur Oblast
- 111th Guards Red Banner Order of Kutuzov Tank Regiment - Yekaterinoslavka
- 125th Guards Tank Regiment - Belogorsk
- 277th Guards Motor Rifle Regiment - Belogorsk, which later became the 143rd Guards MRR
- 64th Guards Self-Propelled Artillery Regiment - Belogorsk
- 1064th Antiaircraft Rocket Regiment - Belogorsk

== Post-Cold War ==
In the late 1980s or early 1990s the 111th Guards Tank Regiment was reorganised as the 143rd Guards Motor-Rifle Red Banner Order of Kutuzov Regiment at Yekaterinoslavka, a constant readiness unit (Military Unit Number 26381).

One of the machine-gun artillery battalions (was) deployed in Blagoveshchensk.

In 2002 the division became the 21st Guards Motor Rifle Division, and its full formal title in 2009 was the 21st Guards Motor Rifle Vitebsk Lenin Red Banner Order of Suvorov Division. The division was disbanded and its 111th Guards Tank Regiment became the 143rd Guards Motor Rifle Regiment.

The 143rd Guards Motor Rifle Regiment was upgraded to brigade strength as the 38th independent Guards Motor Rifle Brigade. In 2015 the 38th independent Guards Motor Rifle Brigade was located in Belogorsk, Amur Oblast as part of 35th Combined Arms Army.

In the first days of September 2020, about 30 contract servicemen of Military Unit Number 06455 (also 35th Army, possibly 4729 зенитная техническая ракетная база, a rocket artillery equipment depot) in the village of Tomichi, Amur Oblast and their families were involuntarily transferred to Military Unit 21720 (Yekaterinoslavka, Amur Oblast). When the contract servicement came to the morning formation in Tomichi, officers read out a list of the names of about 30 fighters and announced that within 5 hours these servicemen were required to settle their affairs and immediately leave for Military Unit 21720. According to the Committee of Soldiers' Mothers, some of the service personnel involved had only recently been transferred to Tomichi from Yekaterinoslavka, and they were transferred back in breech of regulations as they were not going to be appointed to equal military positions. Some were also detained upon arrival.

=== Russian invasion of Ukraine ===
The brigade was committed to actions as part of the Russian invasion of Ukraine. Ukrainian reports said it suffered heavy losses in early April 2022. The Ukrainian General Staff's public report for 5 May 2022 said that "some servicemen of the 38th Separate Motor Rifle Brigade [...] of the Eastern Military District, after being taken to the recovery area due to significant personnel losses, refused to continue participating in hostilities in Ukraine. [The soldiers were] near the border and [were] waiting to move to the Russian Federation." In early June 2022 the 38th had lost a significant amount of combat power after heavy fighting in the Izyum region of Eastern Ukraine. A combination of poor leadership and lack of basic supplies had left the combined 38th and 64th Separate Motor Rifle Brigades with an estimated "less than 100 servicemen in total" according to Russian military bloggers.

== Structure ==
Organization in 2022

- command;
- 1st motorized rifle battalion;
- 2nd motorized rifle battalion;
- 3rd motorized rifle battalion;
- tank battalion;
- 1st howitzer self-propelled artillery division;
- 2nd howitzer self-propelled artillery division;
- rocket artillery division;
- anti-aircraft missile division;
- anti-aircraft division;
- reconnaissance battalion;
- engineer-sapper battalion;
- command (communications) battalion;
- logistics battalion;
- rifle company (snipers);
- repair company;
- NBC protection company;
- UAV company;
- electronic warfare company;
- commandant company;
- medical company;
- command and artillery reconnaissance battery (chief of artillery);
- command and radar reconnaissance platoon (air defense chief);
- command platoon (intelligence chief);
- military police platoon
- instructor platoon;
- simulator platoon;
- training ground;
- orchestra.

== Heroes of the Russian Federation ==
- Guards Senior Sergeant Matrenitsky, Nikolai Petrovich, commander of the T-80 tank in the tank company, 2023.
- Guards Senior Lieutenant Pyzhov, Viktor Alekseevich, 2024.
