= Pokrovka, Amur Oblast =

Pokrovka Покровка
- Selo
- Location within Amur Oblast Location within Russia
- Coordinates: 50°09′N 128°38′E
- Country: Russia
- Region: Amur Oblast
- District: Oktyabrsky District
- Time zone: UTC+9:00

Pokrovka (Russian: Покровка) is a rural locality (a selo) in Nikolo-Alexandrovsky Selsoviet of Oktyabrsky District, Amur Oblast, Russia. The population was 135 as of 2018. There are 2 streets.

== Geography ==
Pokrovka is located 47 km southwest of Yekaterinoslavka (the district's administrative centre) by road. Nikolo-Alexandrovka is the nearest rural locality.
