= Vladivostok Urban Okrug =

- District
- Flag Coat of arms
- Coordinates: 43°8′5.20″N 131°50′55.64″E
- Country: Russia
- Administrative center: Vladivostok

Area
  - Total: 561.54 km^{2} (216.81 sq mi)
- Time zone: UTC+10 (MSK+7)
- OKTMO ID: 05701000

Vladivostok Urban Okrug is an urban okrug in Primorsky Krai, Russia. It includes the administrative territorial entities of Vladivostok, Popova, Trudovoye, Primorsky Krai. The administrative center is Vladivostok.
