= Zaozerny =

Zaozerny/Zaozyorny (masculine), Zaozernaya/Zaozyornaya (feminine), or Zaozernoye/Zaozyornoye (neuter) may refer to:

- Zaozyorny Urban Settlement, a municipal formation which the district town of Zaozyorny in Rybinsky District of Krasnoyarsk Krai, Russia is incorporated as
- Zaozerny (inhabited locality) (Zaozernaya, Zaozernoye), several inhabited localities in Russia
- Zaozyornaya railway station, a railway station in Krasnoyarsk Krai, Russia
- Zaozerny (volcano), a volcanic cone in Russia
