= Square of the Fallen Fighters =

Central square in Volgograd, Russia

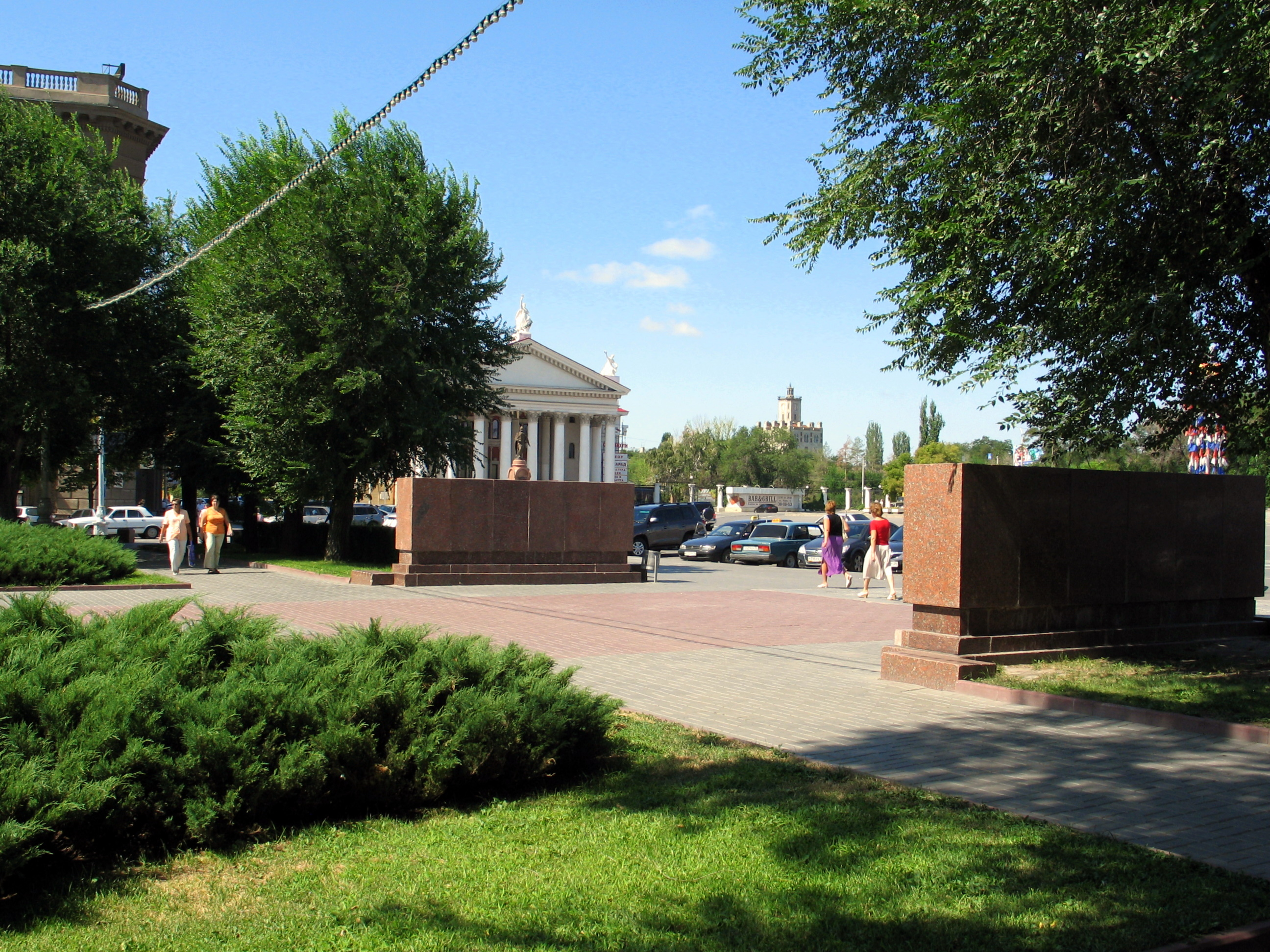
- Interactive map of Square of the Fallen Fighters
- Former names: City Square, Alexandrovskaya Square, Pavshikh Bortsov Revolution Square, People's Demonstrations Square
- Location: Volgograd
- Coordinates: 48.42°N 44.30°E

Square of the Fallen Fighters (Note: Also known as the People's Demonstrations Square in Soviet sources referred to the paved area in front of the stands, while the name Pavshikh Bortsov Square applied only to the park. In modern sources, both parts are referred to as Square of the Fallen Fighters.) (in Russian: Площадь Павших Борцов) is the central square of Volgograd. It has a T-shaped layout, distinctive in its planning and development. The architecture of the buildings on the square is designed based on a unified approach: a tall, three-story, deeply rusticated wall supports the crowning part of the buildings with a rhythmic series of pilasters of the Corinthian order, giving the square's ensemble a strict expressiveness and memorial character. A part of the square is occupied by a park surrounding the mass graves of the fallen heroes of Tsaritsyn and Stalingrad, transitioning into the Alley of Heroes.

The architectural ensemble of Square of the Fallen Fighters, designed by architects V. N. Simbirtsev and E. I. Levitan, is a monument of architecture and urban planning of regional significance. Additionally, within the boundaries of the square is a monument of federal historical significance: "Memorial Site Where on January 31, 1943, the Troops of the Don Front under the Command of Colonel-General Konstantin Konstantinovich Rokossovsky Completed the Defeat of the Southern Group of Fascist German Troops Encircled in the Stalingrad Area and Raised the Red Banner of Victory". The majority of the individual buildings located on the square also hold the status of cultural heritage objects of the Russian Federation.

== History ==
=== Before the Revolution ===
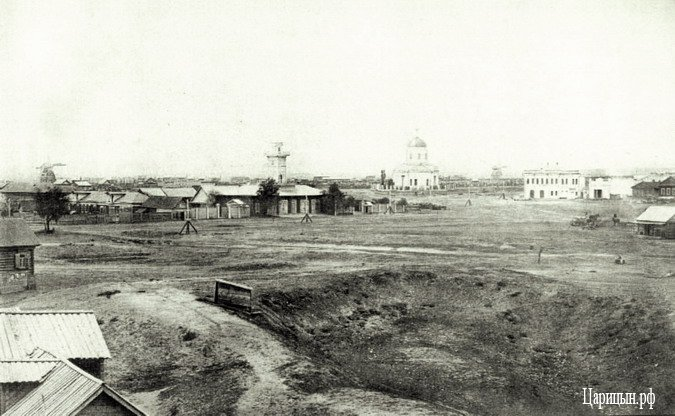
City Square in Tsaritsyn in the 1870s

Until the mid-19th century, the area now occupied by Square of the Fallen Fighters and the Alley of Heroes was a ravine extending from the Tsaritsa River, later filled in with available materials. The first significant structure on the square was a wooden fire watchtower, built around 1854 at the site of the entrance to the modern Medical University. The square, then called City Square, served as a marketplace for trade, and later merchants' shops, taverns, and homes of wealthy Tsaritsyn residents began to appear.

On April 4, 1882, a stone chapel dedicated to Alexander Nevsky was consecrated on City Square in memory of Emperor Alexander II, who was assassinated the previous year. On October 22, 1888, the Tsaritsyn City Duma decided to build the Alexander Nevsky Cathedral to commemorate the miraculous survival of Emperor Alexander III and his family after a train crash. From this time, City Square was renamed Alexandrovskaya Square. The cathedral's foundation stone was laid on April 22, 1901, and it was consecrated on May 19, 1918.

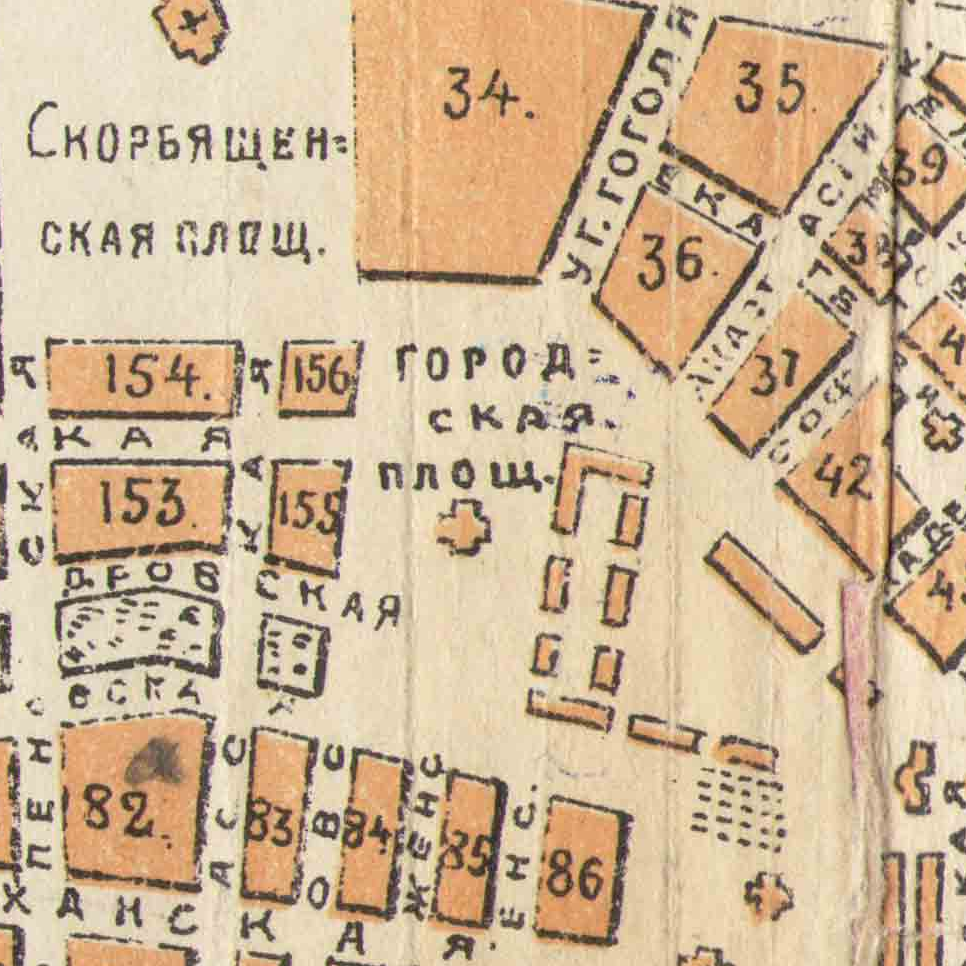
City Square on a 1909 map of Tsaritsyn

On May 1, 1906, an incident on Alexandrovskaya Square resulted in the deaths of several residents. Prior to the event, rumors of a planned general strike circulated in the city; on May 1, workers from several major factories did not show up for work. By evening, a detachment of mobilized militia was marching near the square with songs, mistaken by the police chief for a crowd of demonstrators. A dispatched Cossack unit began dispersing the crowd with whips. By the time it was clarified that the group consisted of militia, a crowd of several thousand had gathered, some of whom began shooting and throwing stones at the police. In response, the police opened fire on the crowd, resulting in eight people seriously injured, four of whom died.

In 1909, the city celebrated the centennial of N. V. Gogol, during which voluntary donations were collected for a monument. In the summer of 1910, the city's first monument was erected in honor of the writer in front of the under-construction Alexander Nevsky Cathedral. Additionally, Yelizavetinskaya Street and the park where the monument was placed were renamed in honor of Gogol.

On June 2, 1913, the foundation was laid for the House of Science and Arts (now the New Experimental Theatre) in the northwest part of the square. It was ceremonially opened on December 20, 1915, and later housed music classes, a library, a local history museum, performances, and lectures.

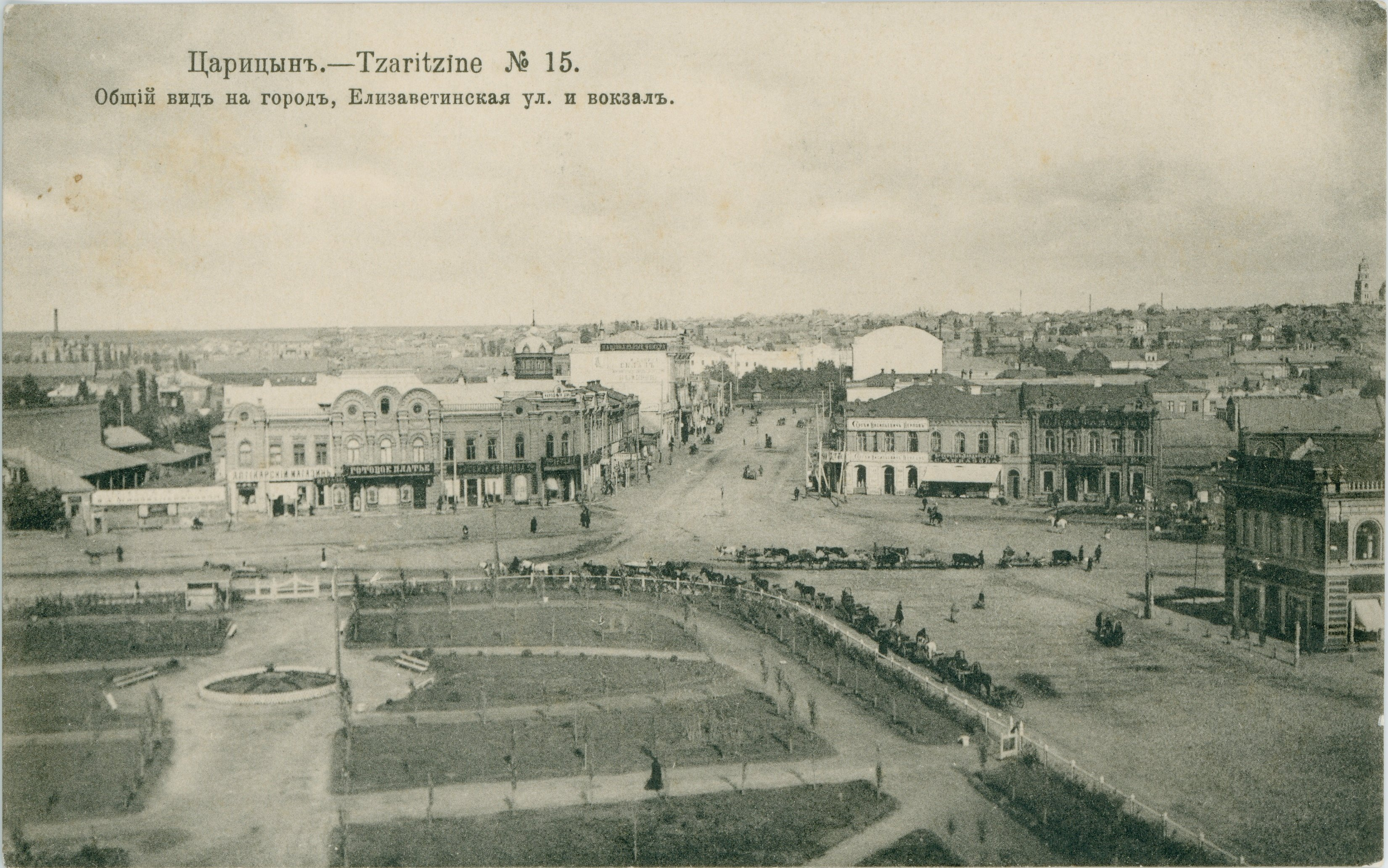
View of Alexander Square from the Alexander Nevsky Cathedral under construction in the early 20th century

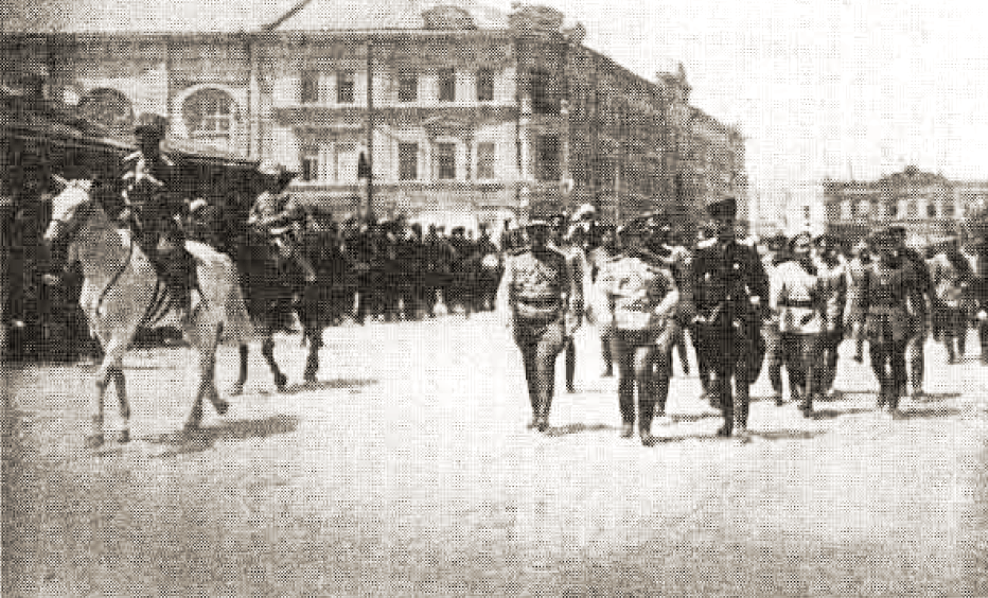
Parade of the All-Russian Socialist Republic on Alexander Square on July 3, 1919, with the Stolichnye Numera Hotel in the background

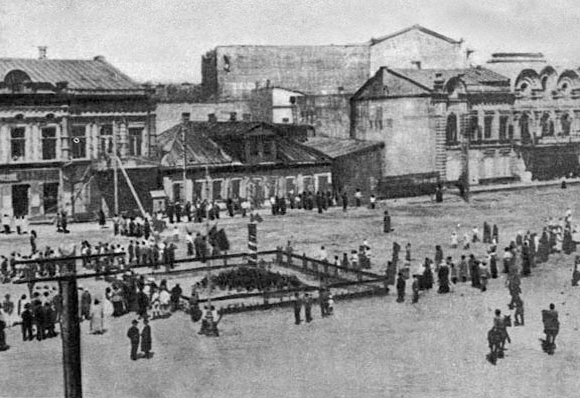
Mass grave before the obelisk's construction

In the summer of 1919, during the battles for Tsaritsyn in the Russian Civil War, the city was captured by the troops of P. N. Wrangel. On June 20, the first parade in the history of the Caucasian Army was held on Alexandrovskaya Square, commanded by P. N. Wrangel and reviewed by A. I. Denikin. When the Red Army retook Tsaritsyn on February 8, 1920, the square hosted the burial of 55 fallen revolutionaries, and from this time, it was renamed Pavshikh Bortsov Revolution Square. On May 3, 1923, a monument was unveiled at the burial site with an inscription on one side reading, "From the proletariat of Red Tsaritsyn to the fighters for freedom who fell in 1919 at the hands of Wrangel's executioners," and on the other side stating that the Tsaritsyn proletariat sacredly honors the memory of their fallen comrades. The monument was located on the axis of Moskovskaya Street, near the corner of the "Capital Rooms" hotel (now the "Volgograd" hotel).

=== Interwar period ===
External images
- Pavshikh Bortsov Square between the wars
- Lenin monument with a bolt-shaped pedestal
- Pre-war view of Pavshikh Bortsov Square

On May 1, 1925, a monument to V. I. Lenin, created by Leningrad sculptor V. V. Kozlov, was unveiled on the square. It was located at the entrance to the park near the Alexander Nevsky Cathedral, close to the current site of the Medical University. The monument, designed in a constructivist style, depicted a bronze Lenin in everyday attire with his right hand raised high, standing on a large carved bolt placed on a tall concrete pedestal.

The active formation of the new architectural ensemble of Square of the Fallen Fighters began in 1928 with the design and construction of the first new building, a five-story House of the City Communal Department (Gorko). Completed in 1930, it was later called the "Second House of Soviets" but became known as the House of Pilots after a pilots' school was added in 1931 in the new constructivist architectural style, novel for central Stalingrad.

In 1932, the administrative center of the Lower Volga Region was transferred from Saratov to Stalingrad, spurring construction to accommodate relocated institutions and their staff. The First House of Soviets (also known as the Commune House, previously the "Stalingradskaya" hotel) was expanded with a fourth floor. In the same year, a four-story dormitory for the regional executive committee was built in the constructivist style along the central axis of Square of the Fallen Fighters. On March 21, 1932, the Alexander Nevsky Cathedral was demolished. The adjacent Gogol Park was expanded and renovated, with flowerbeds planted, trees added, and benches installed. In 1933, the monument-obelisk to the defenders of Red Tsaritsyn was relocated from its original position on Moskovskaya Street to the park.

In 1934, the Red Army House (formerly Yablokov's house) was expanded by two floors according to a project by P. Kalinichenko and I. Ivashchenko. In 1935, the city's largest hotel, the "Bolshaya Stalingradskaya" with 230 rooms (designed by Maslov, F. Dyuzhenko, and V. Kochedamov), was built, along with the "Intourist" hotel and the administrative-residential building of Oblmestprom (Legprom), designed by V. Kochedamov and I. Ivashchenko. These buildings were also designed in the constructivist style with strict facade lines and large glazed areas.

In 1936, the Main Post Office building (previously owned by merchant A. A. Repnikov) was reconstructed according to V. Stepanov's design, later housing Narkomtyazhprom and Pishcheprom institutions, and eventually model stores for "Meat," "Fish," and "Tobacco." A year later, the Regional Executive Committee building, designed by I. Ivashchenko in the constructivist style, was completed at the intersection of Lomonosovskaya and Pervomayskaya streets, balancing the northwest side of Square of the Fallen Fighters. The pre-war ensemble of the square was completed in 1938 with the construction of the Central Department Store, designed by M. Tsubikova, I. Ivashchenko, and A. Chekulaev.

Overall, the pre-war architectural ensemble of the square was diverse: on one hand, it retained brick style buildings. On the other, constructivist buildings emerged. Additionally, the ensemble included reconstructed buildings expanded atop former merchant mansions. In total, eight new buildings were constructed, and four older Tsaritsyn-era buildings were renovated during this period.

=== Battle of Stalingrad ===
During the Battle of Stalingrad, the square became a battleground for fierce fighting. From September 15 to 27, 1942, soldiers of the 13th Guards Rifle Division held the defense on the square.

By January 1943, the Germans had turned the square into the main stronghold of the southern group of Paulus' troops. The adjacent buildings and streets —Krasnoznamenskaya, Surskaya, and Lomonosovskaya— were heavily fortified. When the headquarters of the 6th Army was established in the basement of the department store, the command of the encircled troops further strengthened the defending garrisons.

On January 30, 1943, units of the 38th Motorized Rifle Brigade, under the command of Colonel I. D. Burmakov, overcame German resistance on the streets adjacent to the square. By the morning of January 31, they reached Square of the Fallen Fighters and captured the buildings of the Gorky Drama Theatre and the Regional Party Committee. At the same time, under the blows of the 62nd Army, German resistance points in the city garden and railway station fell. Despite being surrounded, the Germans continued to resist. Soviet forces then opened fire with cannons and mortars on the department store housing Paulus' headquarters. Simultaneously, Soviet soldiers approached and blockaded the building, forcing Paulus to negotiate.

The first to enter the 6th Army headquarters and conduct preliminary negotiations for the surrender of the southern German group were officers of the 38th Brigade: F. M. Ilichenko, N. F. Gritsenko, and A. I. Mezhirko. By 9 a.m., the chief of staff of the 64th Army, I. A. Laskin, Colonel I. D. Burmakov, and several other officers arrived to finalize the negotiations.

On February 4, a ceremonial rally was held on Square of the Fallen Fighters to celebrate the defeat of the German fascist troops at Stalingrad. During his speech, the secretary of the regional party committee and chairman of the city defense committee, A. S. Chuyanov, pointing to the city's ruins, said: "In battles with the hated enemy —German fascist invaders— our city has been turned into heaps of rubble. Today, we swear to our Motherland, the Party, and the government that we will revive our beloved city!"

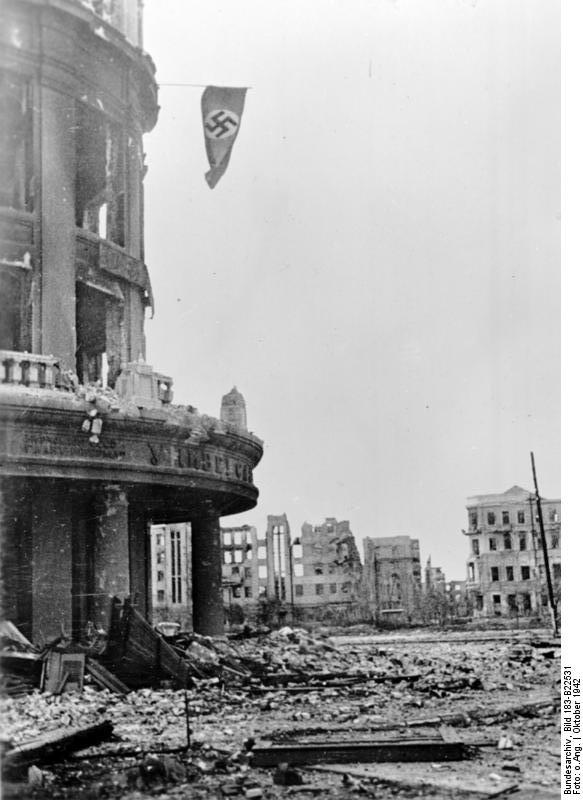
The flag of Nazi Germany above the entrance to the department store

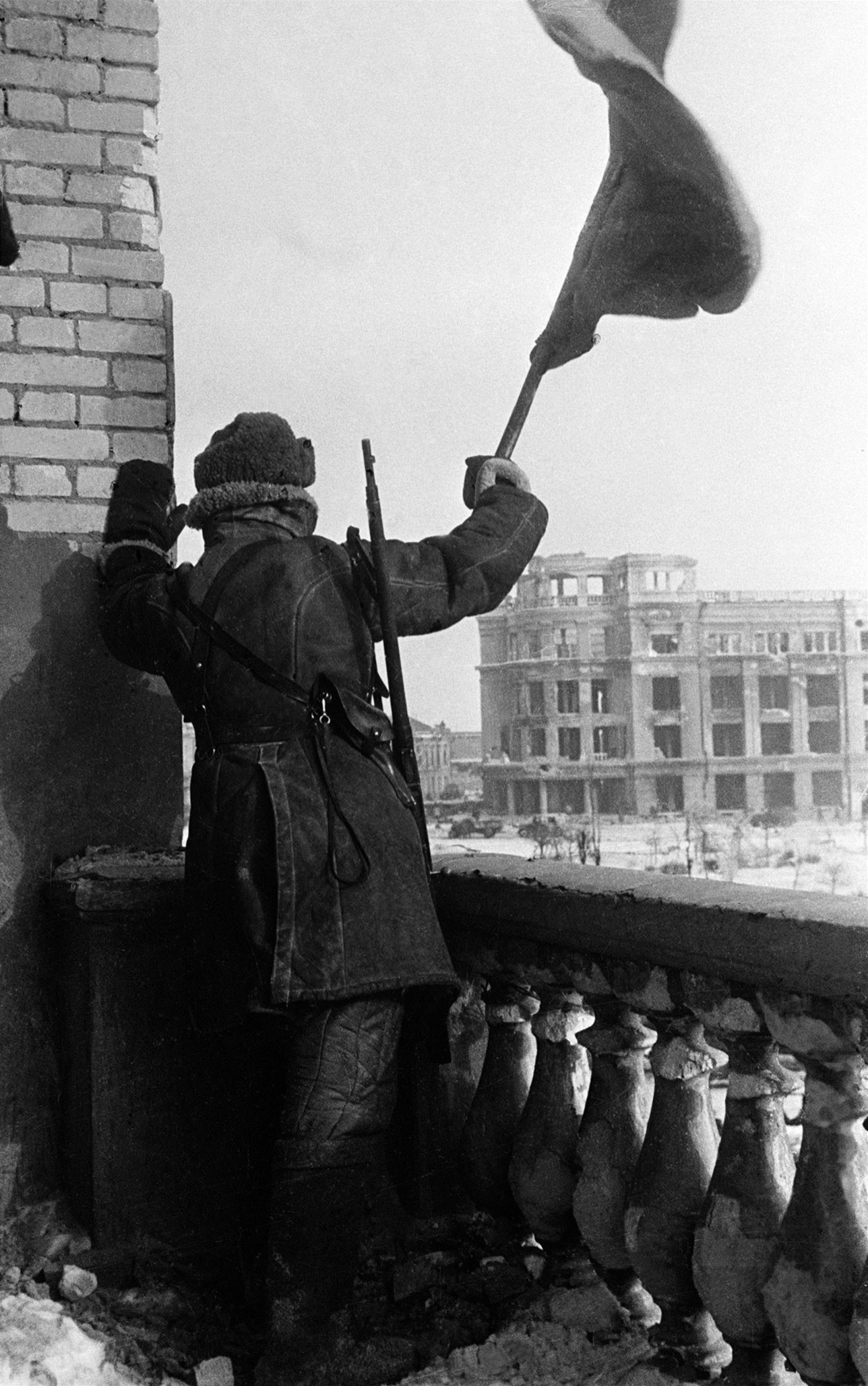
The Red Banner raised above the square

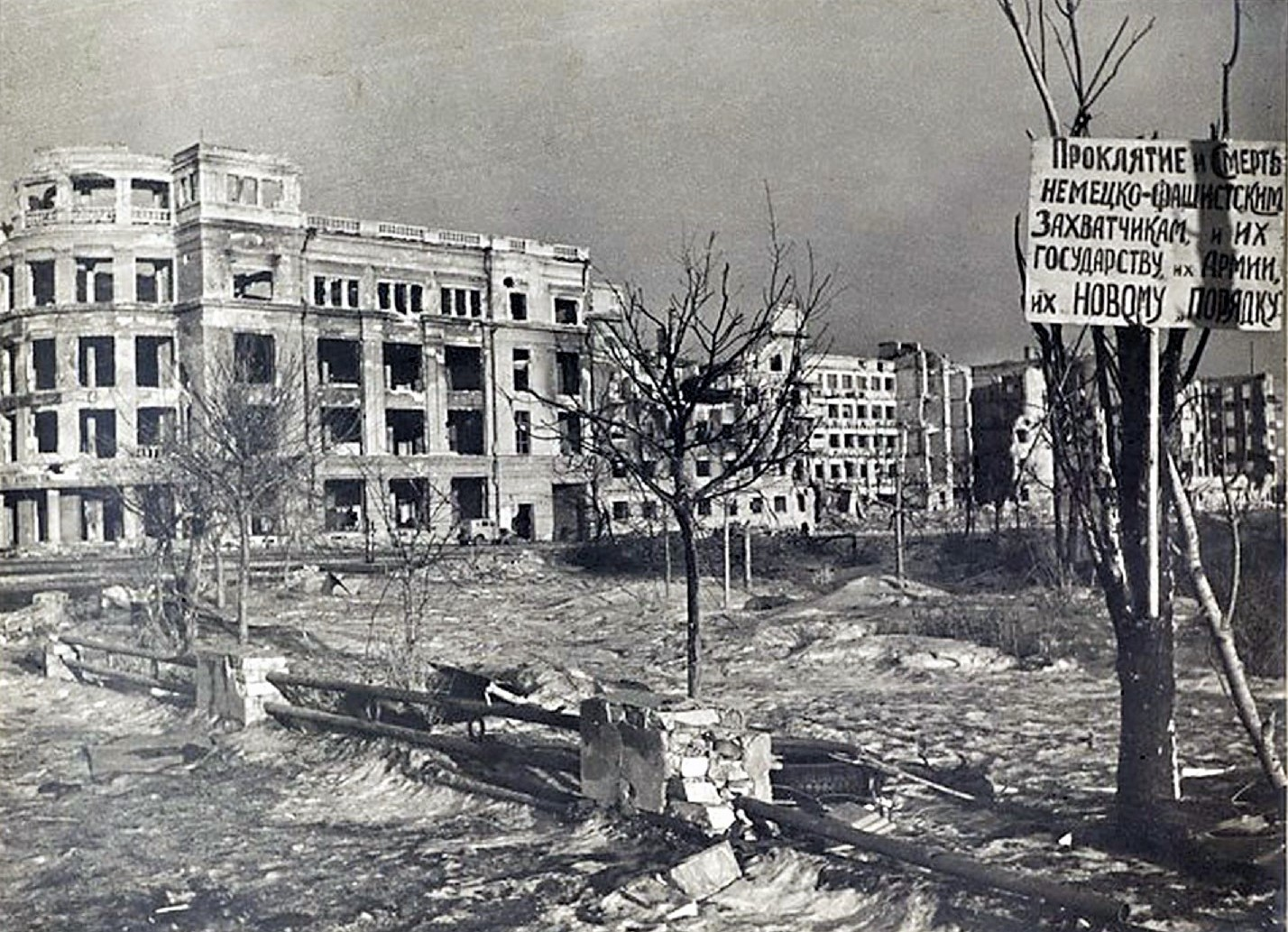
Destruction after the Battle of Stalingrad

=== After the War ===
After the war, extensive design and construction of city center facilities took place, with particular attention to Square of the Fallen Fighters, whose planning began in 1945. Initially, a monumental House of Soviets was planned for the site now occupied by the Medical University and the "Volgograd" hotel. However, two nationwide competitions for the best design yielded unsatisfactory results, and the House of Soviets was relocated to the north of the square, where the Alexander Nevsky Cathedral now stands. Due to the design of several structures —the Regional Party School, the communal hotel (now the "Volgograd" hotel), and the "Intourist" hotel— a symmetrical composition and architectural character for the square's buildings were chosen.

The first building in the post-war ensemble of Square of the Fallen Fighters was the Party School, constructed in 1951. In 1956, the "Volgograd" hotel was built, followed a year later by the "Intourist" hotel and the administrative building of Gidrostroy. At the same time, the mass grave obelisk and park were reconstructed, completing the square's ensemble. However, changes continued: in 1964, the facade of the Central Department Store facing the square was renovated, and in 2021, a replica of the Alexander Nevsky Cathedral, demolished in 1932, was completed in the stands area where the House of Soviets was once planned.

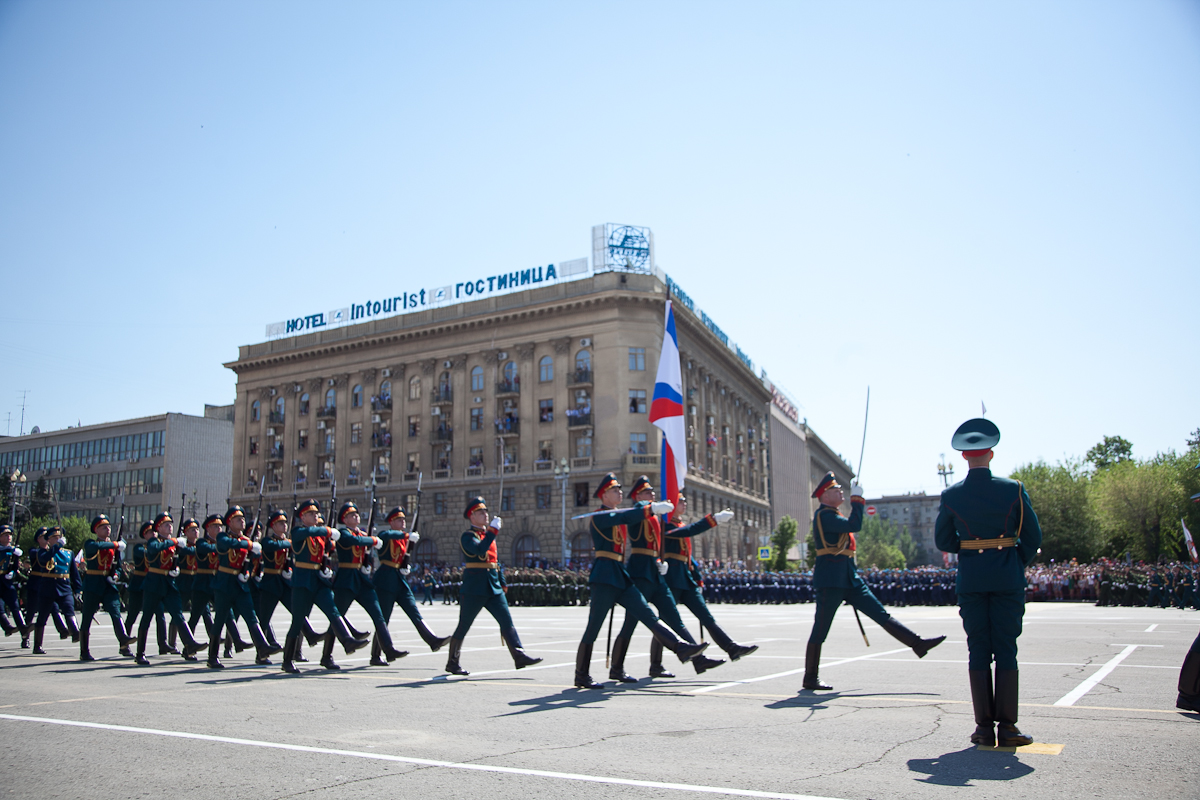
Victory Day parade

Overall, the post-war reconstruction largely preserved the layout of Square of the Fallen Fighters, though it was slightly expanded toward the railway station after the ruins of buildings in the northern part—now Alexandrovsky Garden—were demolished. The Main Post Office was built on the site of the destroyed "Bolshaya Stalingradskaya" hotel, and buildings on the southern side were removed to make way for the Alley of Heroes. The architectural appearance of the buildings changed significantly: nearly all were designed differently from their predecessors, except for the restored Central Department Store and, to a lesser extent, the Commune House, on whose foundations the "Volgograd" hotel was built. The square's current length is approximately 270 meters, with its width varying from about 120 meters to 260 meters.

Square of the Fallen Fighters hosts various events: during New Year's holidays, the city's main Christmas tree and attractions are set up; parades are held on February 2 and May 9; and concerts, rallies, and demonstrations occasionally take place.

== Square Layout ==
The Square's map

1 – Main Post Office
2 – Intourist Hotel
3 – Department Store
4 – Gidrostroy Building
5 – Obelisk and Eternal Flame
6 – Poplar Tree that Survived the Battle of Stalingrad
7 – Grave of Three Heroes
8 – Alexander Nevsky Chapel
9 – Medical University
10 – Volgograd Hotel
11 – New Experimental Theatre
12 – Alexander Nevsky Monument
13 – Alexander Nevsky Cathedral and Alexandrovsky Garden

== Square Ensemble ==
=== Main Post Office (Mira Street, 9) ===
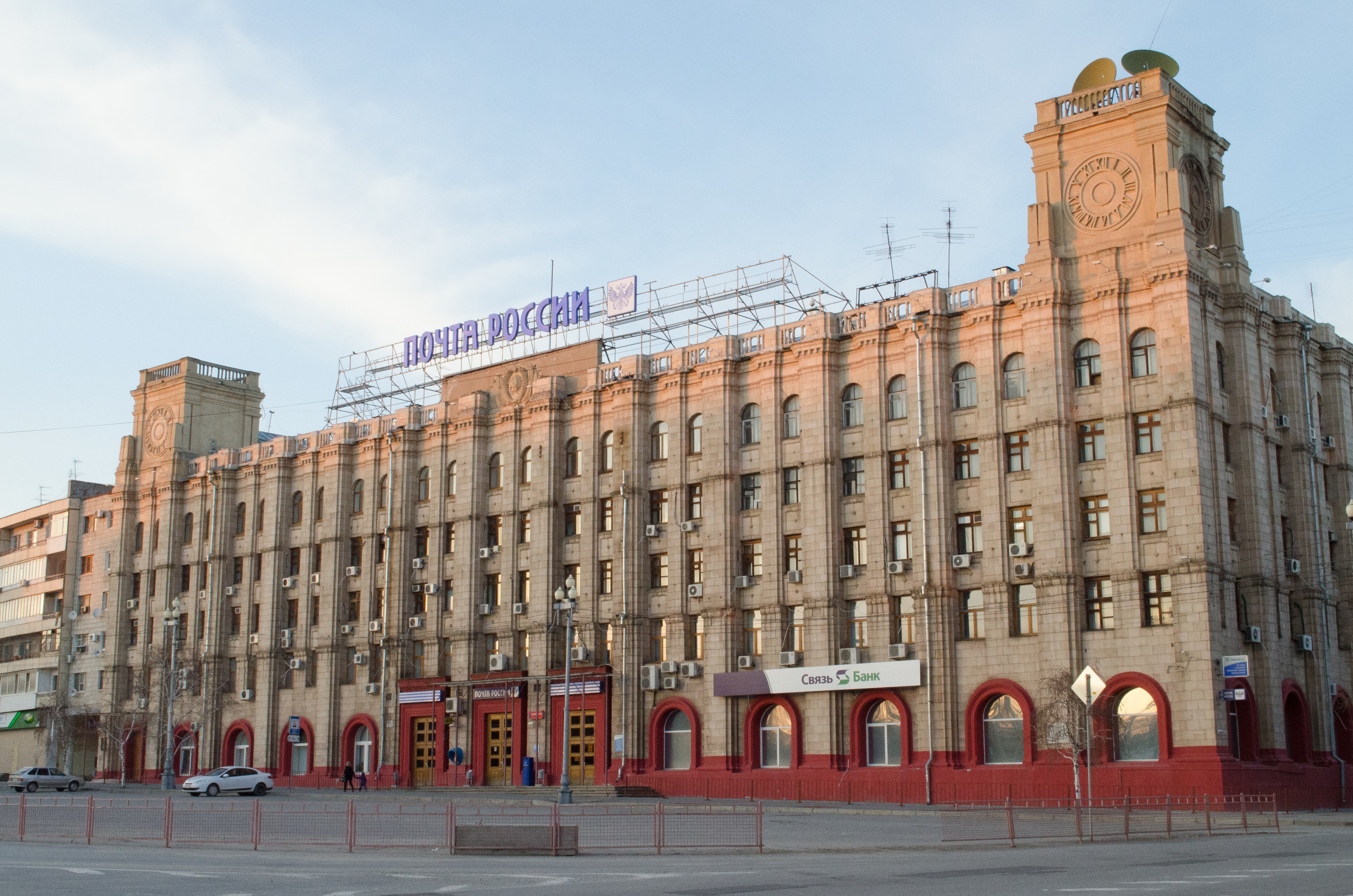
Main Post Office

The Main Post Office is a five-story brick building with an L-shaped plan. Its northeast facade closes off Square of the Fallen Fighters, while the southeast facade faces Mira Street, both clad in silicate tiles. The building is unique in its architectural design, combining elements of Gothic and classical architecture.

The facade facing the square is symmetrical, with its axis marked by an entrance portal and a high parapet on the roof, decorated with the state coat of arms of the USSR. The facade's composition is based on a rhythmic repetition of profiled pilasters with complex outlines every two windows. The large details of the three entrances and the portal-like design of the ground-floor windows lend the building a monumental appearance. The corners of the building at roof level are marked by symmetrically placed cubic towers designed to resemble clocks. The original plan included installing clock mechanisms in these towers, but as a clock was already installed on the nearby railway station, the decision was made to forgo clocks on the post office to save costs.

The project was designed by Stalin Prize laureate E. I. Levitan. Construction of the Communications House began in 1953 and was completed on June 30, 1955, when the state commission deemed the building fit for use. The Main Post Office is a monument of architecture and urban planning of regional significance.

=== Intourist Hotel (Mira Street, 14) ===
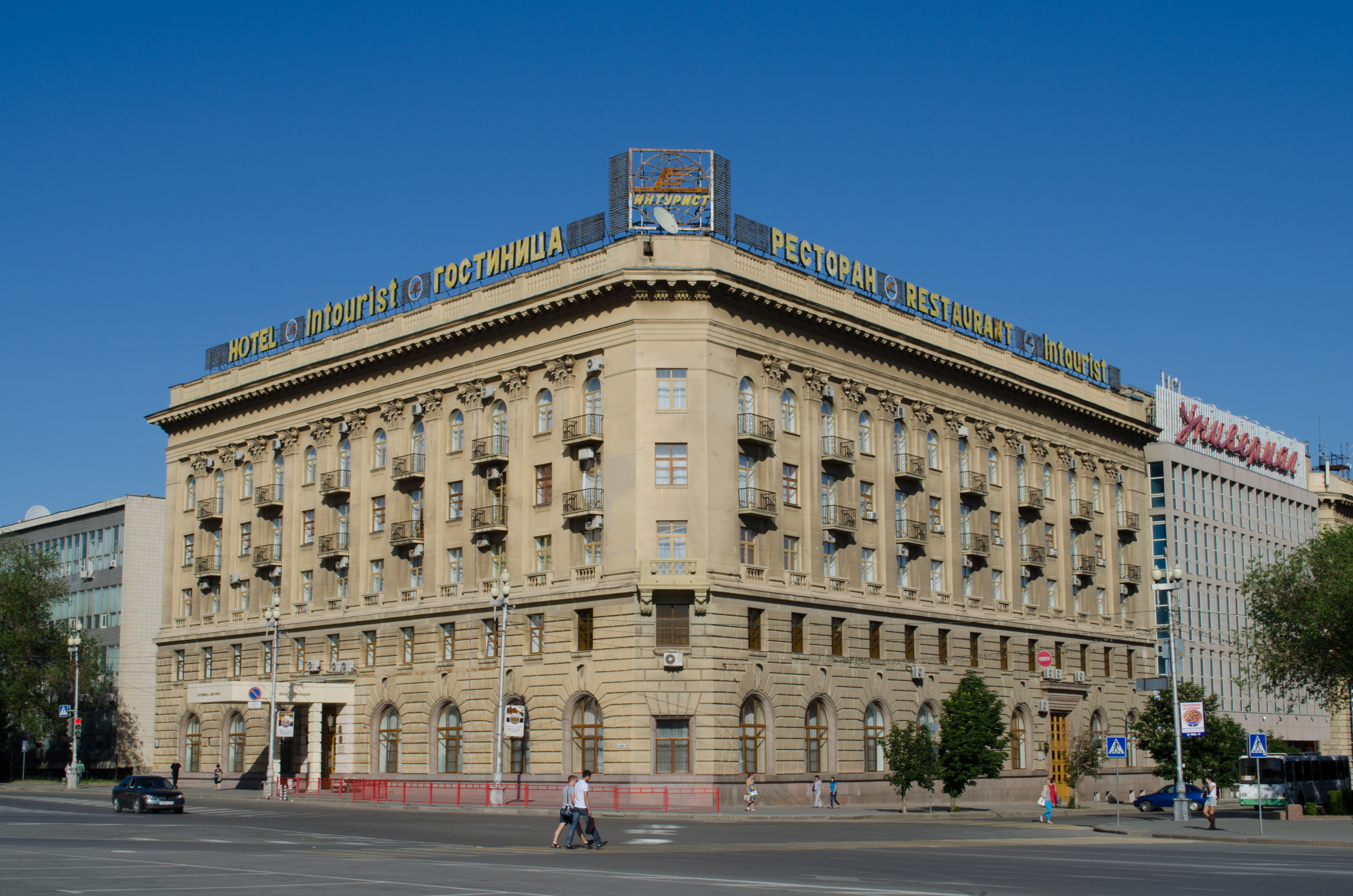
Intourist Hotel

The Intourist Hotel is located at the corner of Mira Street and Square of the Fallen Fighters, resulting in an L-shaped plan. The chamfered corner is designed along a single axis. The architecture reflects the neoclassical style of the mid-1950s, incorporating elements of the classical order system and ornamental moldings, such as pilasters, a parapet with a balustrade atop the crowning cornice, bandelets, and moldings shaped like acanthus leaves. The facades are divided into two tiers, with the lower tier rusticated. The building features two equally prominent entrances —one from Square of the Fallen Fighters and one from Mira Street— both designed as distinct portals.

The hotel was designed by the Stalingradproekt Institute, with architect B. G. Goldman as the author. Construction began in May 1953 by the Stalingradstroy Construction Department and was completed on December 25, 1957, with a ceremonial opening the following day. The Intourist Hotel is a monument of architecture and urban planning of regional significance.

=== Department Store (Square of the Fallen Fighters, 2) ===
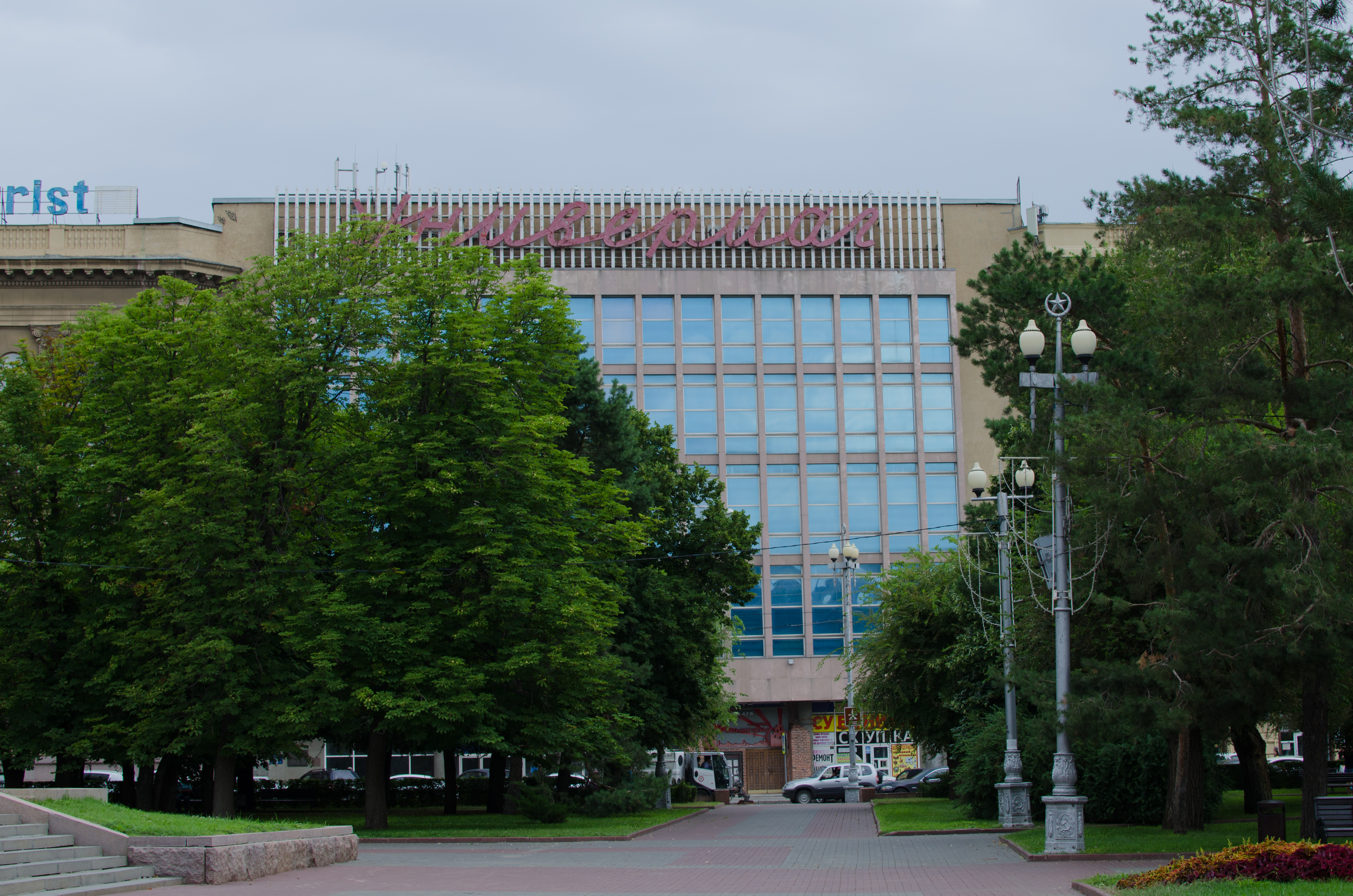
Central Department Store

The Volgograd Central Department Store was built in 1937 by architect M. P. Tsubikova. The four-story, L-shaped building played a significant role in the pre-war ensemble of Square of the Fallen Fighters, serving as a key landmark in the layout and silhouette of central Stalingrad. The rounded corner at the intersection of Square of the Fallen Fighters and Ostrovsky Street was the compositional center, housing the main entrance to the store until 1965.

On August 23, 1942, during the massive bombing of Stalingrad, the upper floor of the building was destroyed. In January 1943, the basement housed the headquarters of Friedrich Paulus, commander of the 6th Army. On January 31, Field Marshal Paulus was captured in this basement by the brigade of I. D. Burmakov.

The building was heavily damaged during the Battle of Stalingrad but was restored in 1949 by architect I. K. Beldovsky. The facade and main layout were restored to their original form, but the construction of the Gidrostroy and Intourist Hotel buildings in 1957 obscured the department store's facade, and the post-war reconfiguration of the square caused its facade line to deviate from the overall plan. In 1964, to complete the square's ensemble, architects E. I. Levitan and B. G. Goldman added a five-story glass-and-concrete extension on the square-facing side, aligning with the facades of the Intourist and Gidrostroy buildings via a shared cornice. The facade on Ostrovsky Street retained its original appearance.

The Volgograd Department Store is a monument of federal historical significance and a monument of architecture and urban planning of regional significance.

=== Gidrostroy Building (Lenin Avenue, 15) ===
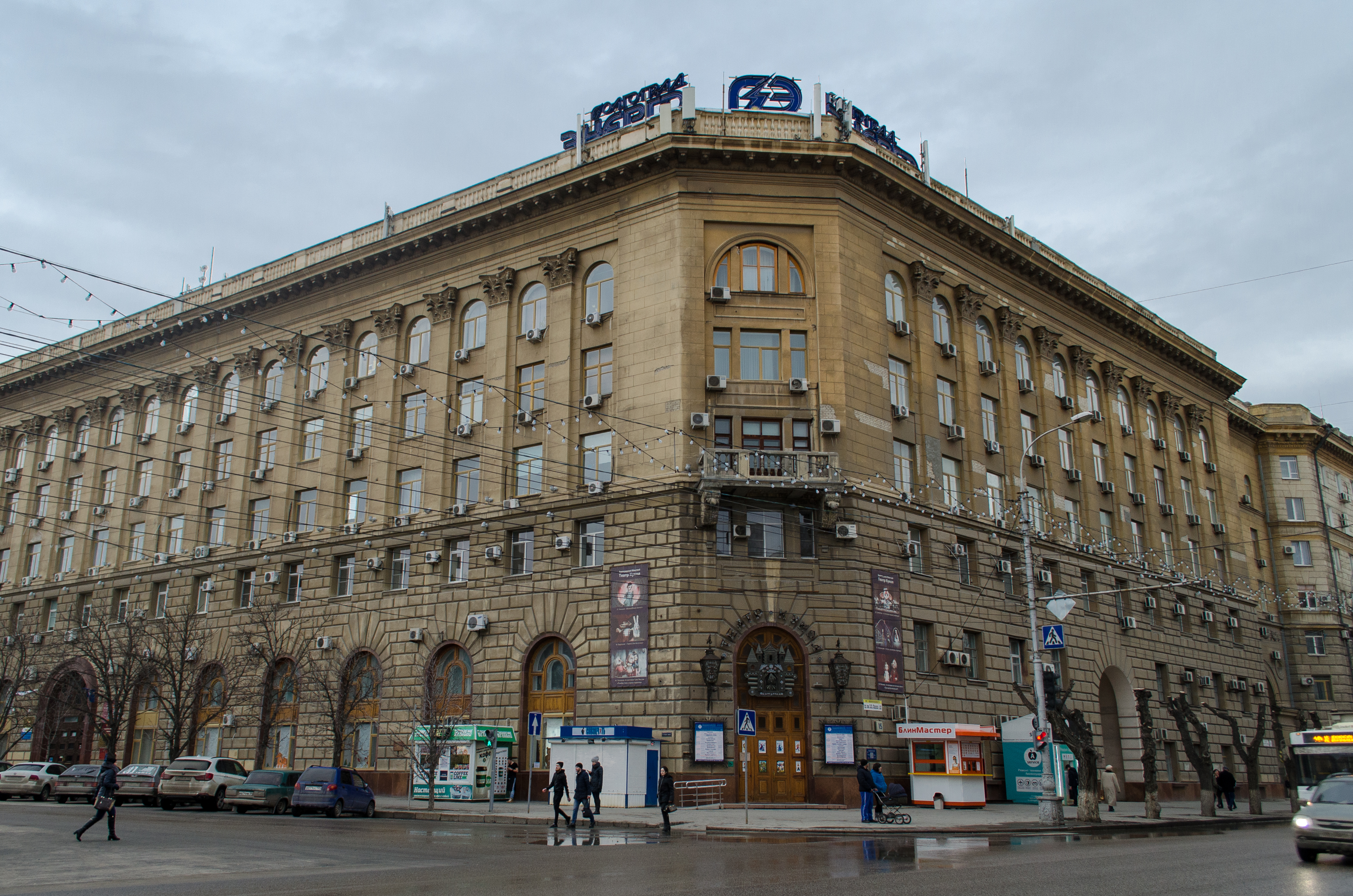
Gidrostroy Building

The administrative Gidrostroy Building was constructed in 1957 by architect E. I. Levitan. Like other structures framing the central park from the north and south, its architecture features a two-story crowning section with a rhythmic row of pilasters of the Corinthian order, elevated on a three-story rusticated wall. The building is a monument of architecture and urban planning of regional significance.

Since 1956, the ground floor has housed the Volgograd Regional Puppet Theatre.

=== Park ===
The park occupying part of Square of the Fallen Fighters was formed on the site of Tsaritsyn's Gogol Park, originally laid out in front of the Alexander Nevsky Cathedral toward the railway station. After the cathedral's demolition, the park was expanded and reconfigured. The park surrounds the mass graves of the fallen heroes of Tsaritsyn and Stalingrad, located along the axis of the entire esplanade. It is designed in a parklike style with a wide main alley featuring a central flowerbed, culminating in a monument-obelisk dedicated to the participants of the Civil and Great Patriotic Wars. Diagonal side paths in the park provide resting areas for residents and visitors.

At the park's exit toward the Alexander Nevsky Cathedral, a zero kilometer marker for the Volgograd Region's roads, installed in 1999, is embedded in the pavement. Made of granite, it takes the form of a compass indicating the four cardinal directions.

A granite obelisk over the mass grave commemorates those who died defending Red Tsaritsyn during the Civil War and Soviet soldiers who fell in the Battle of Stalingrad. The first obelisk over the Tsaritsyn defenders’ mass grave was built from brick before the war, after the Red Army retook Tsaritsyn. In 1933, following the demolition of the Alexander Nevsky Cathedral, the monument, originally located on the axis of Moskovskaya Street, was moved to its current location.

Following the Battle of Stalingrad, over 100 people were buried in a mass grave beside the obelisk commemorating the defenders of Red Tsaritsyn. These were soldiers from the 62nd and 64th armies who perished in the battle for the square. Combining the graves of those who died in two wars, the monument acquired its current appearance in April 1957 following reconstruction based on a design by architect V. E. Shalashov. This reinforced concrete structure, faced with red granite, consists of a 26-metre-high obelisk and a granite tomb platform whose slopes are covered with turf. The obelisk bears the inscription "Here lie the heroic defenders of Krasny Tsaritsyn, brutally tortured by White Guard executioners in 1919" on one side, and "The proletariat of Krasny Tsaritsyn — to the fighters for freedom" on the other.

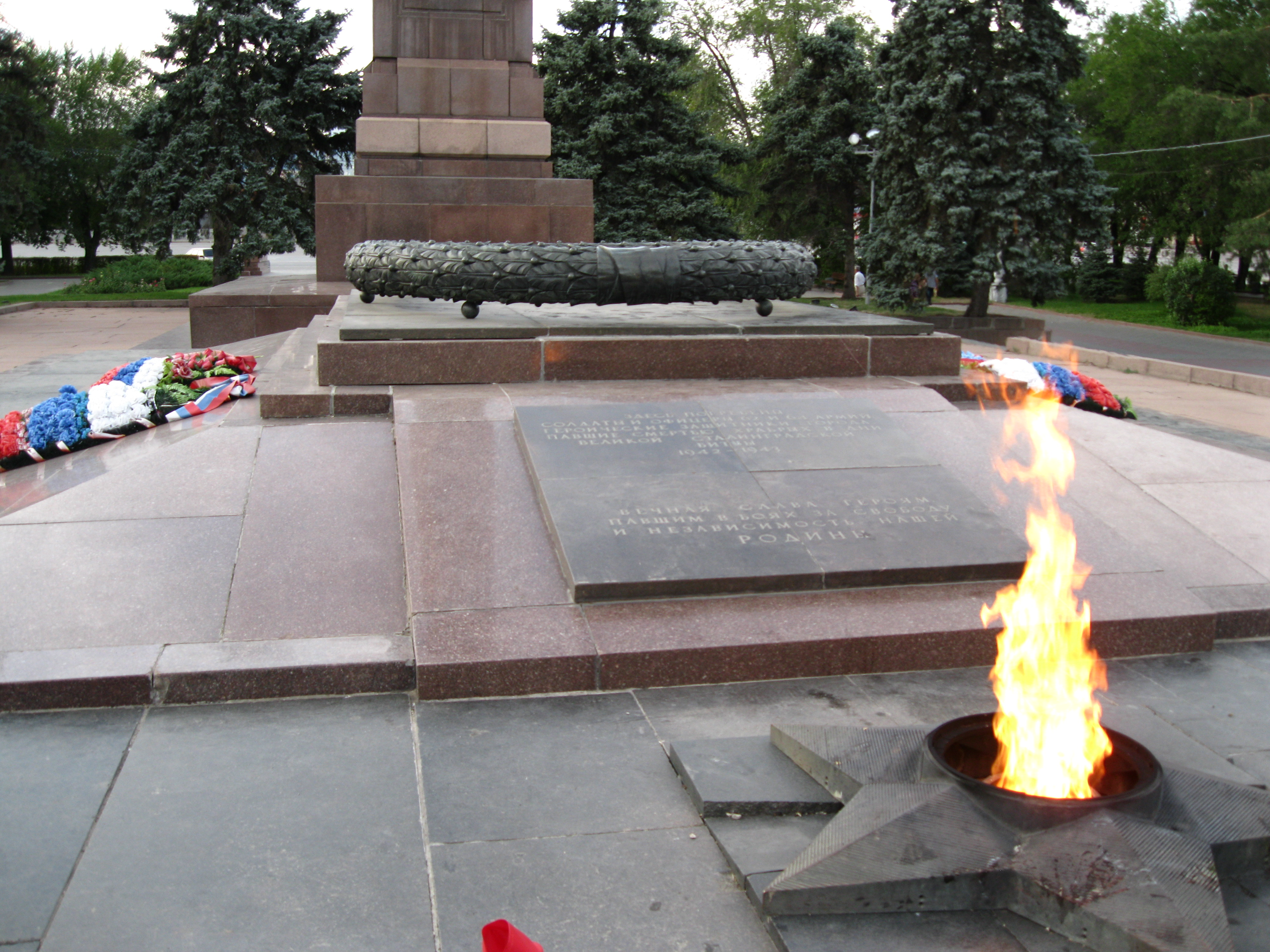
Eternal Flame

On the same granite base as the obelisk, a monument to Stalingrad's defenders, shaped as a bronze laurel wreath, is located. Another inscription on a granite slab reads: "Here are buried the soldiers and officers of the 62nd and 64th Armies—heroic defenders of the city who fell bravely in the days of the Great Battle of Stalingrad 1942–43. Eternal glory to the heroes who fell in battles for the freedom and independence of our Motherland".

On February 1, 1963, on the eve of the 20th anniversary of the Battle of Stalingrad, the Eternal flame was ceremonially lit. Hero of Socialist Labor I. P. Strizhenok ignited a torch from a spark at the Volga Hydroelectric Station, which was carried in a relay by athletes to the square. Heroes of Socialist Labor, steelmaker A. F. Serkov and builder V. V. Rudnitsky, lit the Eternal Flame from this torch. In front of the Eternal Flame is Post No. 1, established in 1965, where schoolchildren stand as an honor guard. The mass grave with the obelisk and Eternal Flame is a monument of federal historical significance.

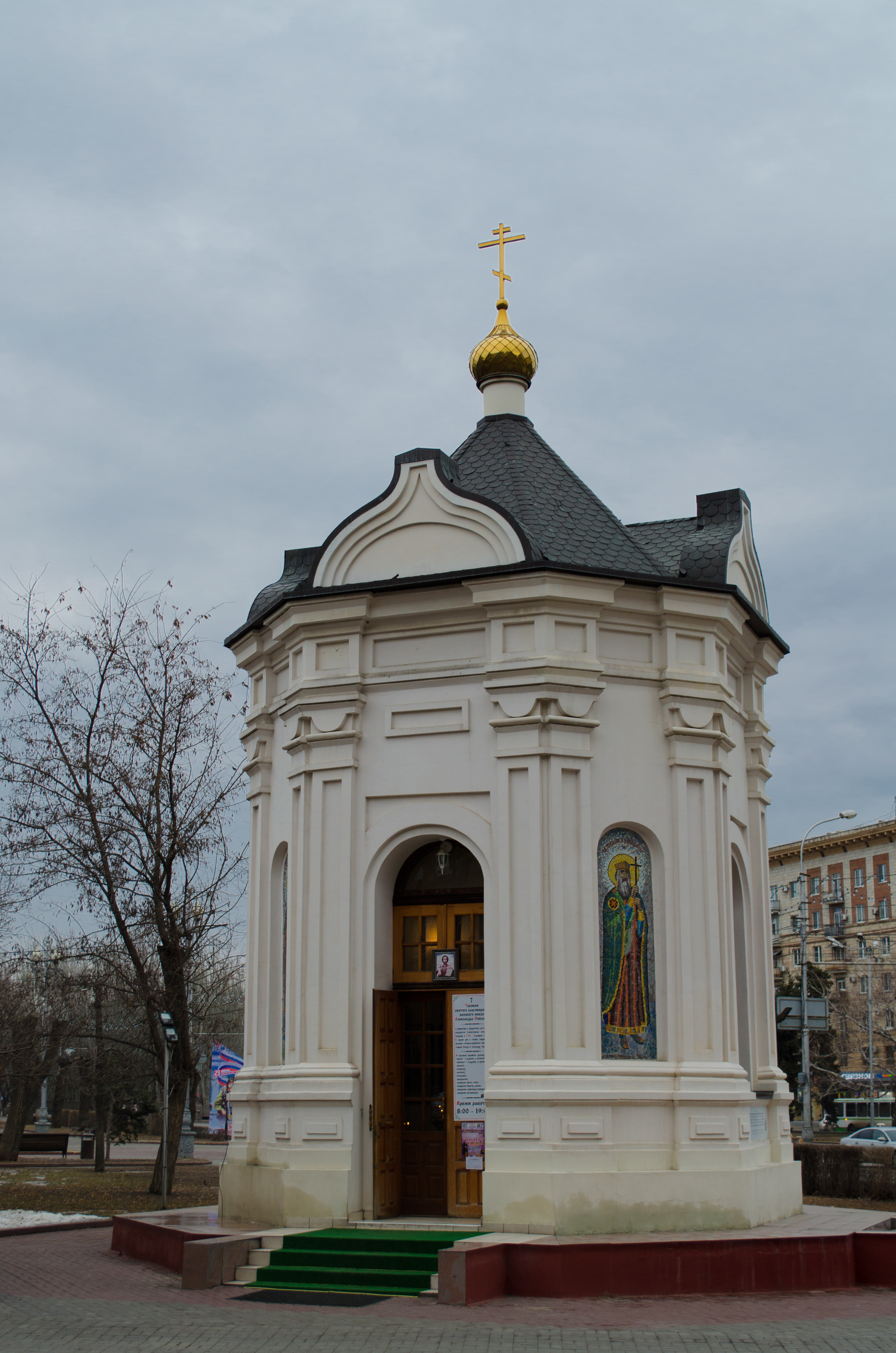
Alexander Nevsky Chapel

Near the mass grave in the park stands the famous poplar tree, which, according to official accounts, survived the Battle of Stalingrad. In 1975, a granite memorial plaque was installed near the tree, inscribed: "This poplar carried its life through the great battle".

In the southern part of the park lies another mass grave of Stalingrad's defenders, topped by a vertical stele of red and black granite with a bronze bas-relief depicting a kneeling soldier kissing a banner and swearing to avenge fallen comrades. The monument was created by Leningrad sculptor I. I. Petin and Volgograd architect E. I. Levitan. Below the bas-relief, an inscription reads: "Here lie those who died in battles with German fascist invaders defending Stalingrad: the glorious son of the Spanish people, Hero of the Soviet Union, machine-gun company commander Captain Ibarruri Ruben Ruiz, Hero of the Soviet Union pilot Major Kamenshchikov V. G., and artilleryman Captain Fattakhutdinov Kh. F., posthumously awarded the Order of Lenin". The military burial and its memorial are a monument of federal historical significance.

In 1882, a brick octagonal chapel in the Russian style, topped with a low tent roof and a small dome, was built in memory of Emperor Alexander II using donations from citizens and the city. From 1883, the chapel was managed by the Uspensky Cathedral clergy. It was demolished in the 1920s. In 2005, it was rebuilt in its original form, slightly offset from its previous location, near the site of the Alexander Nevsky Cathedral, demolished in 1932.

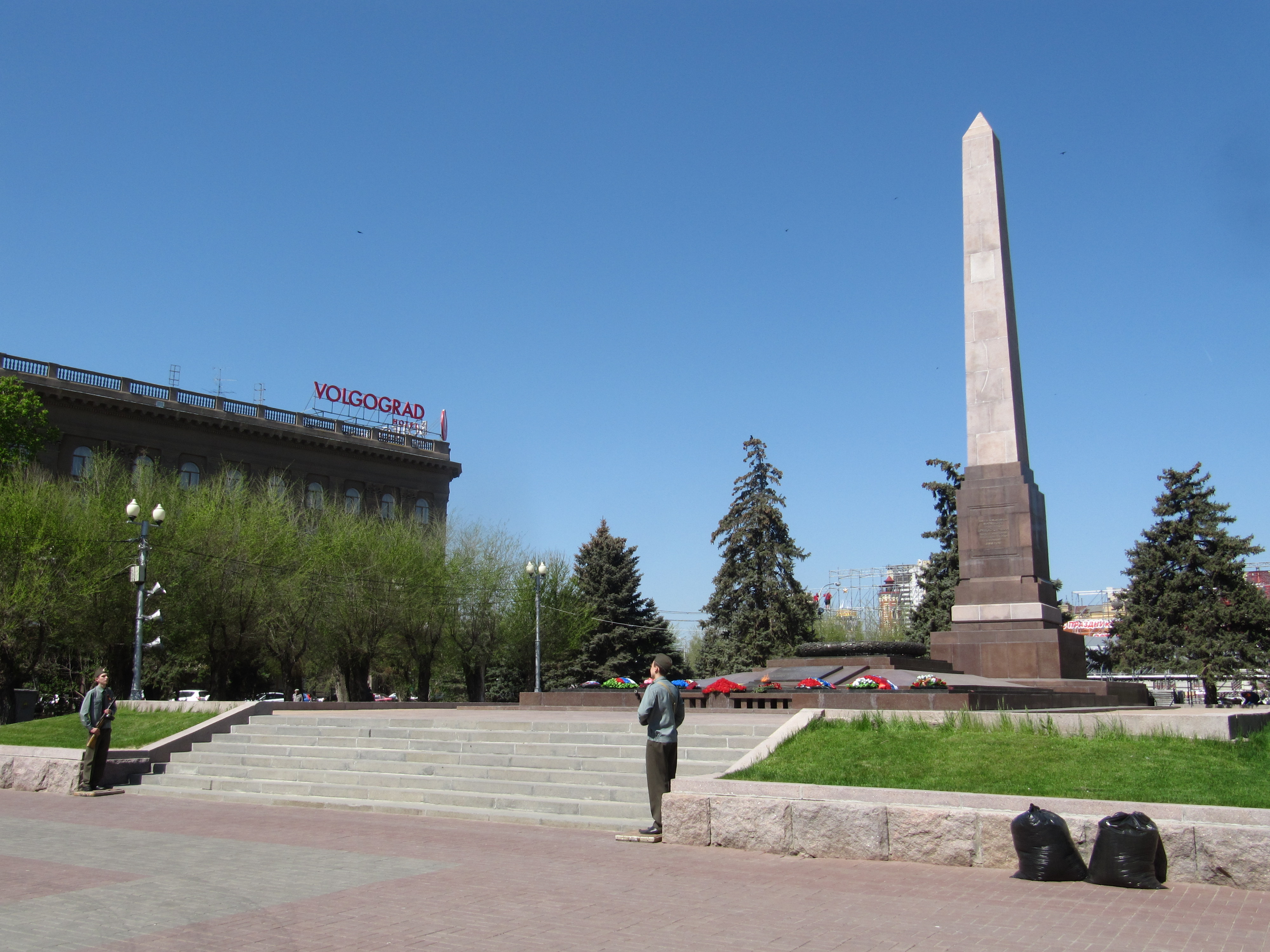
Monument-obelisk to the Stalingrad and Krasny Tsaritsyn's defenders

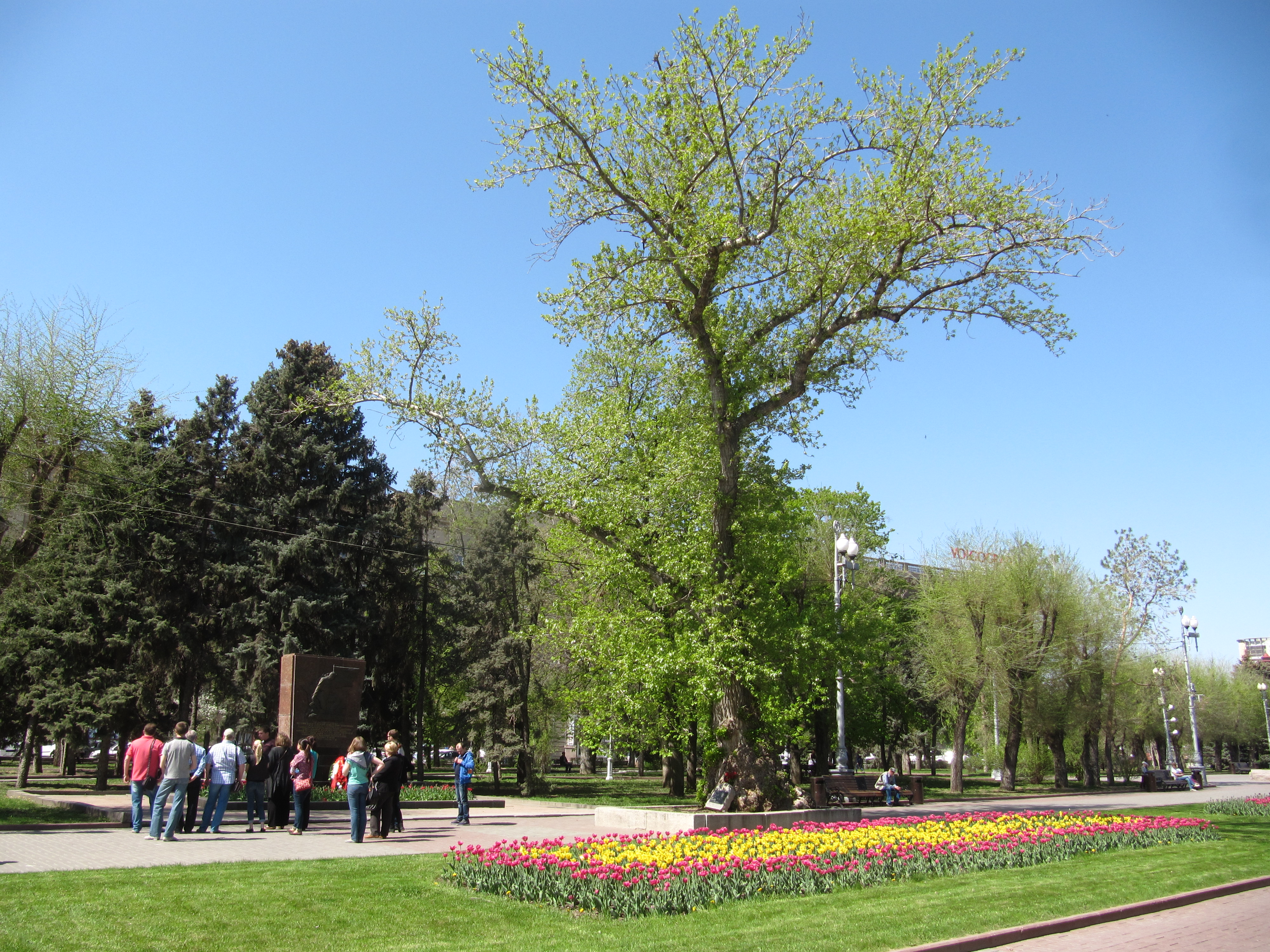
Poplar tree that survived the Battle of Stalingrad

=== Medical University (Square of the Fallen Fighters, 1) ===
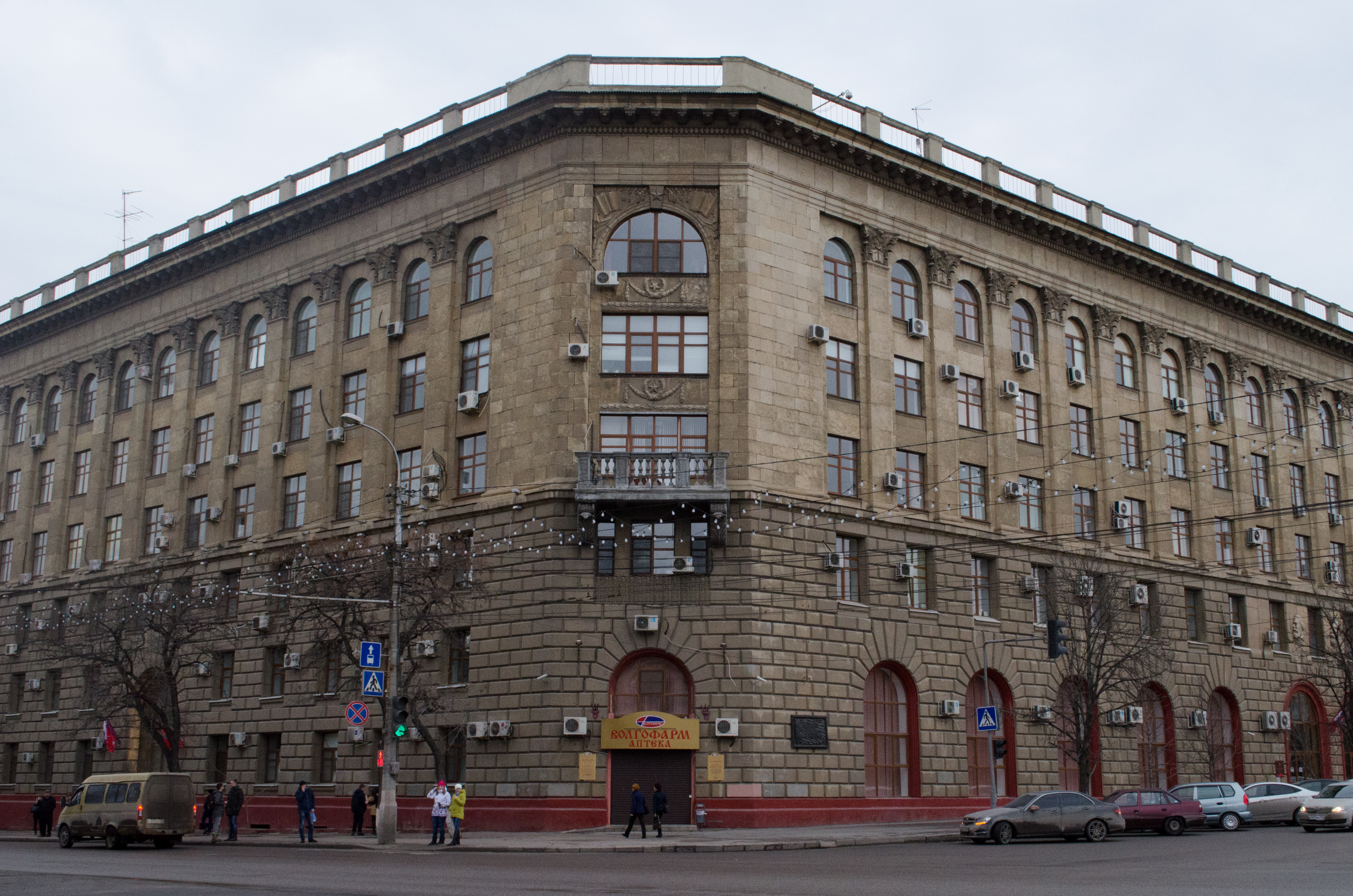
View of the Medical University building from Alley of Heroes

Before the revolution, the site of the modern Medical University housed a wooden fire watchtower and the house of the Kazeev merchants. In the early 1930s, the entire southern side of the square underwent major reconstruction, during which the fire station and the Kazeev house were demolished, and the House of Pilots was built in their place.

During the Battle of Stalingrad, the House of Pilots was almost completely destroyed. In the mid-1940s, plans were made to build the monumental Stalingrad House of Soviets on its site (and that of the former "Capital Rooms" nearby), so restoration of the House of Pilots was not considered. Despite architectural competitions, none of the projects were implemented, and the planned site for the House of Soviets was moved to the western part of the square. In 1951, the Higher Party School building was constructed on the site of the House of Pilots, later transferred to the Medical Institute.

As the first post-war building on the square, the Higher Party School set the tone for the central city's development in the style of Italian palazzos. The building has a calm, expressive character, with its facade based on a two-part division: the lower two floors feature a deeply rusticated wall with wide arched windows, while the upper three floors have a smooth wall with small, simple rectangular windows alternating with metrically arranged pilasters of the Corinthian order, their capitals adorned with open books. Notable features include arched openings and large overhanging cornices. The building is crowned with a parapet and balustrade. The main entrance from the square is designed as a semicircular arcade, above which are bas-reliefs depicting communist figures. For their work on the building, architects E. I. Levitan and V. N. Simbirtsev received the Stalin Prize in 1951.

The Medical University building is a monument of architecture and urban planning of regional significance. Additionally, a memorial plaque on the building is part of the protected federal historical monument, marking the site where the troops of the Don Front under the command of Colonel-General K. K. Rokossovsky completed the defeat of the southern group of German fascist troops encircled in the Stalingrad area and raised the Red Banner of Victory.

In front of the university's main entrance is a five-kopeck monument, commemorating the student superstition that placing a five-kopeck coin under one's heel ensures an excellent exam grade. There is also a memorial marker honoring the medics of Tsaritsyn–Stalingrad–Volgograd, designed as a two-meter granite stele in the shape of the Latin letter "V," resembling a broken heart, containing a "tree of life," symbolizing the caring hands of a doctor.

=== Volgograd Hotel (Mira Street, 12) ===
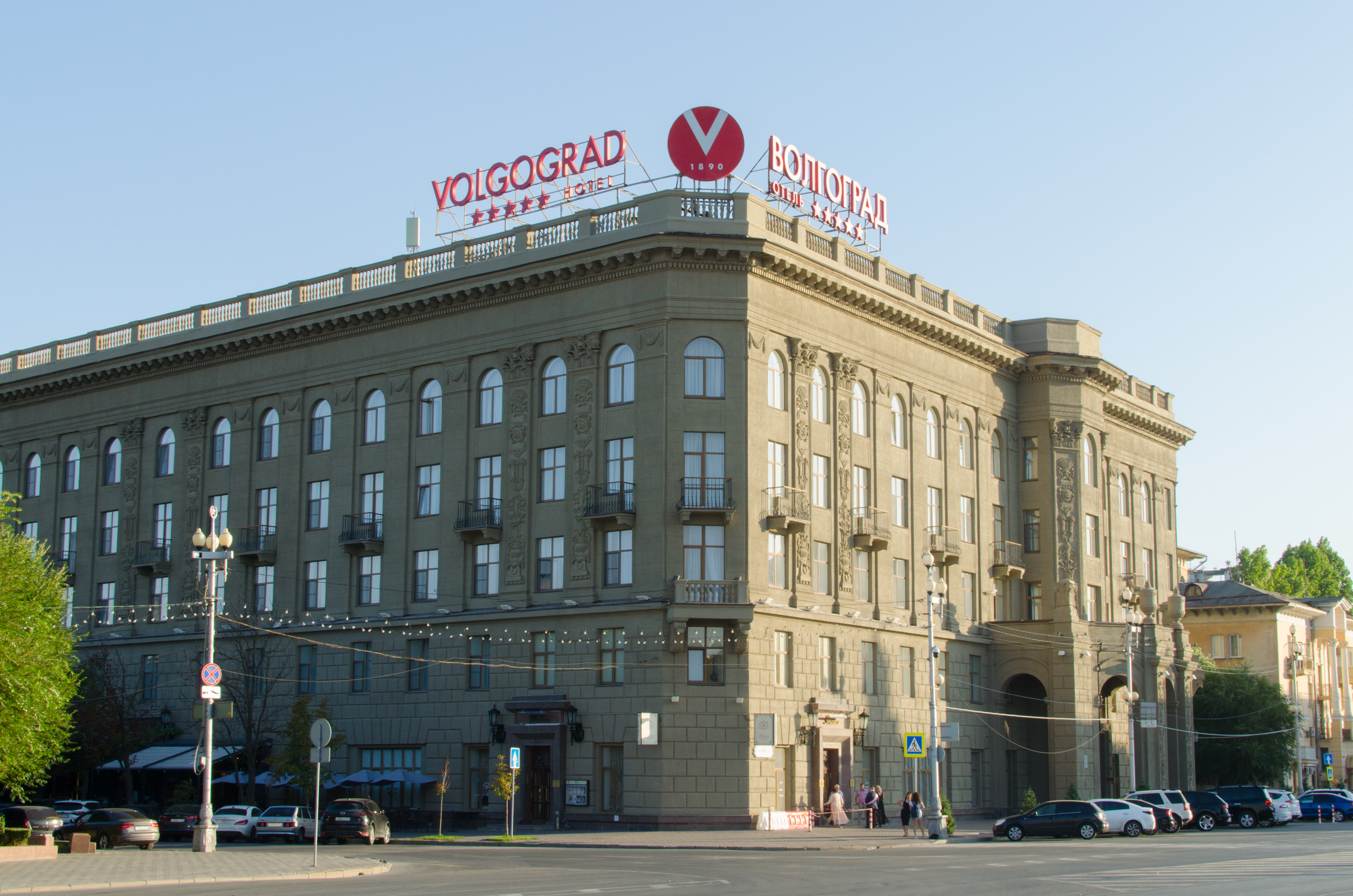
Volgograd Hotel

In 1890, one of Tsaritsyn's largest merchants, Vasily Voronin, opened the "Capital Rooms" hotel on Alexandrovskaya Square. In addition to hotel accommodations, the building housed shops, a restaurant, an assembly hall, and hosted literary evenings, concerts, public events, meetings, a theater, and, from 1895, the Tsaritsyn stock exchange. During World War I, the building, then the city's finest hotel, was converted into a hospital for wounded soldiers.

After the revolution, the "Capital Rooms" housed the Extraordinary Regional Committee for Food and Supply of Southern Russia under the Narkomprod of the RSFSR, managing procurements in southern Russia. The building also hosted the editorial office of the "Soldier of the Revolution" newspaper. In June 1918, I. V. Stalin and G. K. Ordzhonikidze lived and worked there. In the mid-1930s, due to a shortage of residential and office space, the building was expanded with a fourth floor and renamed the "Commune House" or "First House of Soviets". During the Battle of Stalingrad, the hotel was damaged but its walls remained intact. Despite the possibility of restoration, it was demolished due to plans for a monumental House of Soviets on the site; by the time the plan was abandoned, the building had largely been dismantled.

In 1956, the new "Stalingrad" hotel was completed by architect A. V. Kurovsky. It was built on the foundation of the "Capital Rooms," aligning precisely with the original building's location. The facade's architectural theme features a two-part division: the lower two floors have a deeply rusticated wall, while the upper three floors have a wall with rhythmically arranged rectangular windows and richly decorated pilasters. The building is crowned with a large overhanging cornice and a parapet with a balustrade. The main entrance on Mira Street is designed as a colonnaded portico with five semicircular arches two stories high. The base and entrance are clad in granite, and the building's corners are chamfered.

In 1961, along with the city, the hotel was renamed "Volgograd". The building is a monument of architecture and urban planning of regional significance and a monument of regional historical significance as the "Capital Rooms Hotel, where the Extraordinary Food Committee (ChOKPROD) operated, managing procurements in southern Russia".

=== New Experimental Theatre (Mira Street, 5) ===
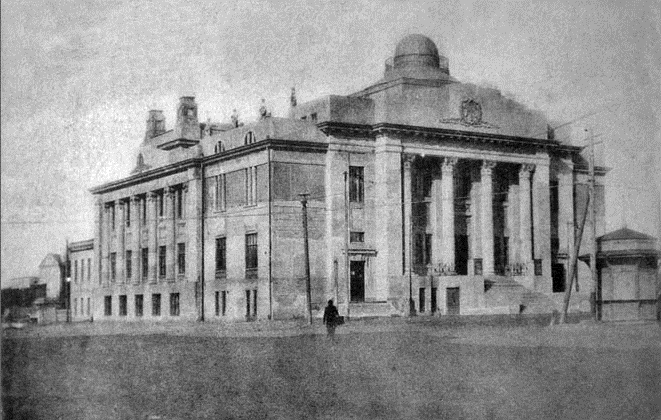
House of Science and Arts in Tsaritsyn

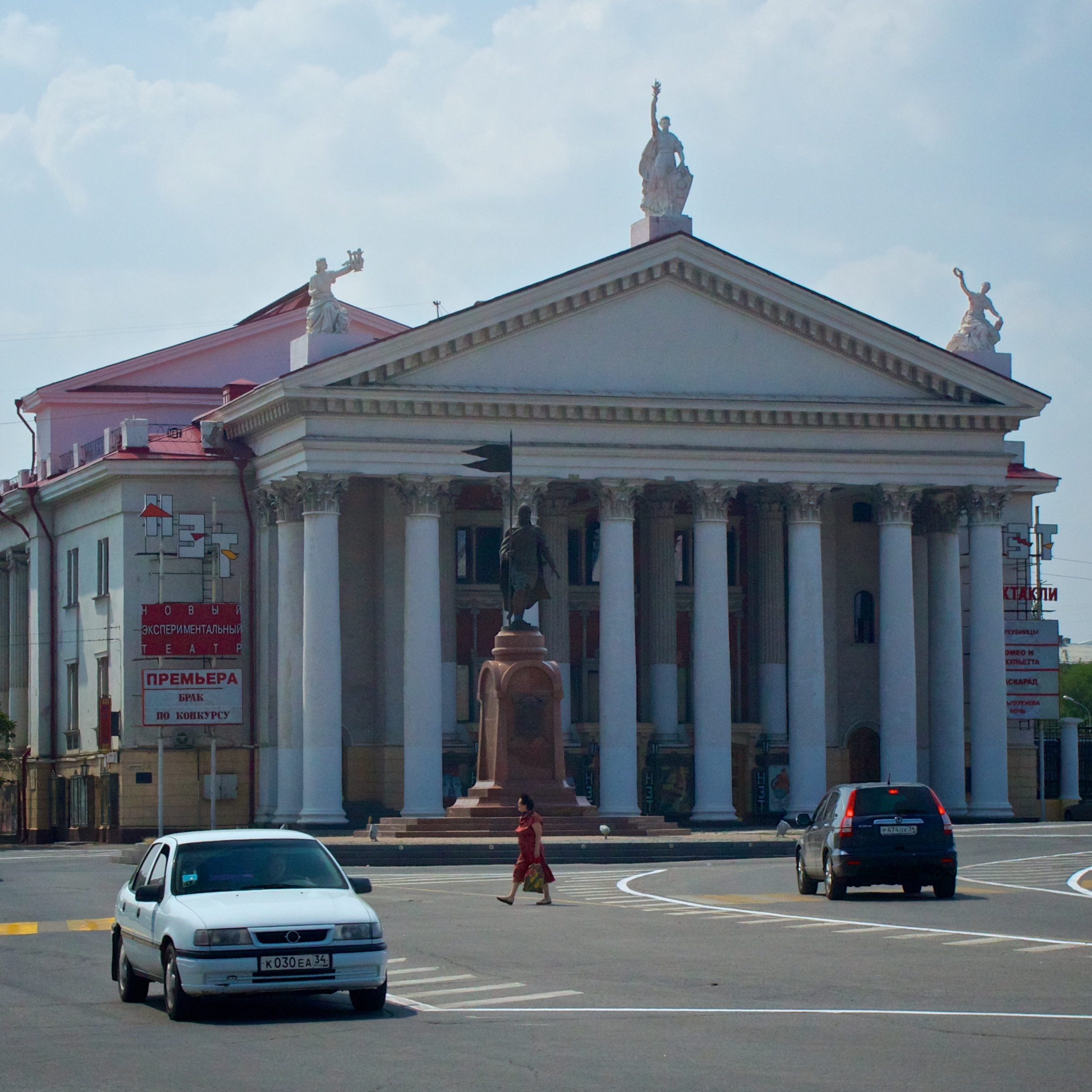
New Experimental Theatre and Alexander Nevsky Monument

The New Experimental Theatre building was erected in 1915 on the initiative and with funds from Tsaritsyn philanthropist Alexander Repnikov as the House of Science and Arts. It hosted lectures, music classes, a library, a local history museum, and amateur and professional performances. The facade facing Alexandrovskaya Square featured a portal with a molded laurel wreath supported by four massive columns, a high granite staircase leading to the main entrance, and large white lion sculptures at the base. The facade was adorned with bas-reliefs depicting themes of science and art.

After the revolution, the building housed the Tsaritsyn City Council of Workers’, Soldiers’, Peasants’, and Cossacks’ Deputies, and from 1918, a theater. It was significantly damaged during the Battle of Stalingrad but deemed restorable. Reconstruction was completed in 1952 by architect Kurennoy, preserving many original details. However, the exterior underwent significant changes: a colonnade topped with sculptures of three Muses was added before the main entrance, which was significantly widened. The original facade remains within the colonnade. The theater is a monument of architecture and urban planning of regional significance and a monument of regional historical significance as the "Site of the Tsaritsyn Executive Committee of the Council of Workers’, Soldiers’, Peasants’, and Cossacks’ Deputies".

=== Alexander Nevsky Monument ===
On February 24, 2007, a monument to Alexander Yaroslavich Nevsky, the patron saint of Volgograd, widely revered in pre-revolutionary Tsaritsyn, was unveiled on the square. Until 1932, the square was home to the largest church in the Lower Volga, the Alexander Nevsky Cathedral, dedicated to this saint. The monument is planned to be relocated to the Alexander Nevsky Cathedral after its reconstruction in the stands area of the square, where it is currently surrounded by a traffic circle.

The monument depicts the prince in military attire, striding with a battle banner in his right hand bearing the Image of the Saviour Not Made by Hands. The sculptor, Volgograd's Honored Artist of the Russian Federation Sergey Shcherbakov, created a 3.2-meter-high statue on a nearly 4-meter granite pedestal.

=== Stands Area of the Square ===
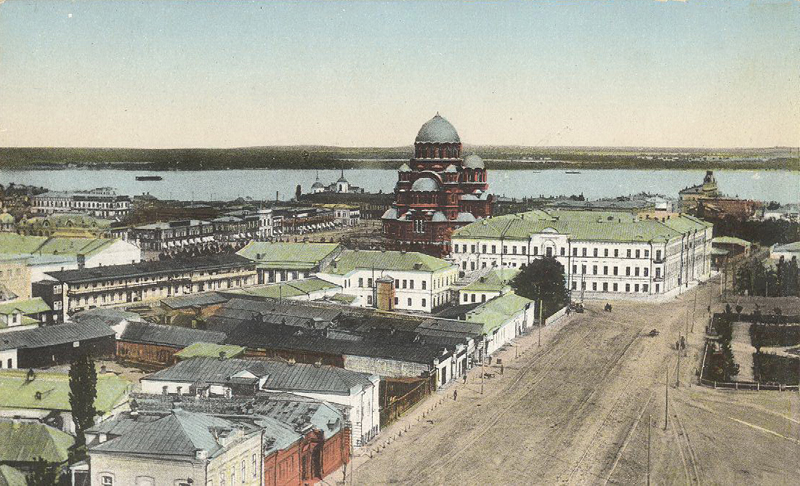
Alexandrovskaya Square in the early 20th century, viewed from the fire watchtower. The 34th block is visible on the left, the Alexander Nevsky Cathedral in the center, and the white "Capital Rooms" hotel on the right.

In Tsaritsyn and pre-war Stalingrad, the park in the stands area of Square of the Fallen Fighters was occupied by the densely built-up 34th block. Historically, the area around the modern stands was occupied by single-story wooden buildings. With the city's rapid growth in the late 19th century, most were demolished and replaced with solid two-story brick houses, many of which survived until the 1940s. By the start of the Battle of Stalingrad, five buildings faced the square: (Note: Listed from Gogol Street to Volodarsky Street.) the Red Army House, the Regional Executive Committee dormitory, the Military Department House, a residential building (formerly Zabelin’s pharmacy), and the Regional Executive Committee.

During the war, the 34th block's buildings were damaged and demolished post-war despite restoration potential, with plans to build a monumental high-rise House of Soviets to complete the square's composition. In 1952, L. V. Rudnev and V. O. Munts designed a project positioning the building along the esplanade's axis from the Volga, closely resembling the Moscow skyscrapers and nearly identical to Warsaw's Palace of Culture and Science. After Stalin's death, Stalingrad's construction projects were significantly simplified or canceled. A park was created in place of the planned building, though the idea of a House of Soviets in the stands area persisted. In the 1970s, architects Yu. Kossovich, V. Maslyaev, A. Leshukanov, A. Savchenko, and G. Kovalenko developed a new project, which was also never realized. Until the early 1960s, a monument to I. V. Stalin by sculptor N. V. Tomsky and architect I. E. Fialko stood behind the stands, demolished after the debunking of the cult of personality.

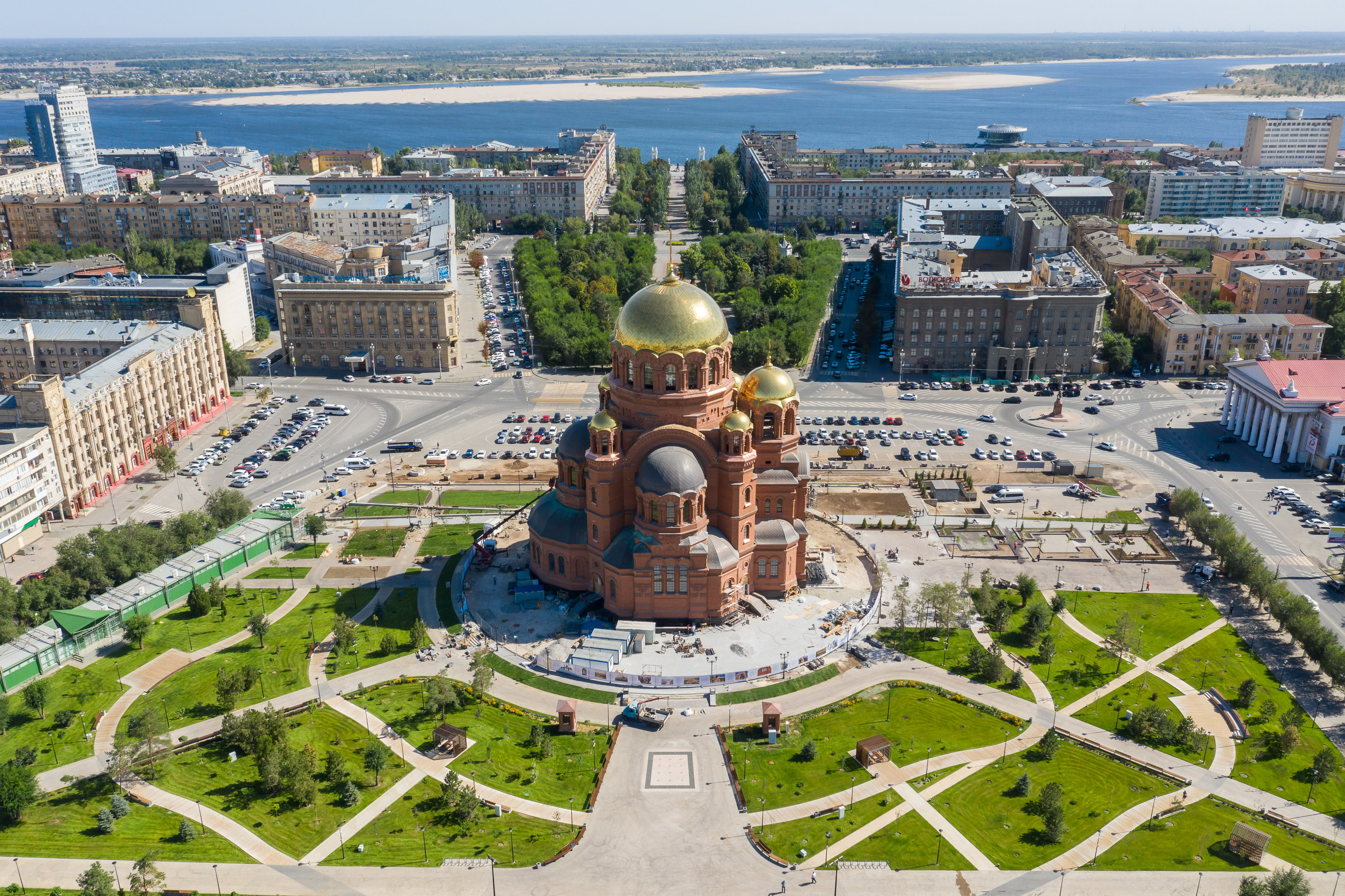
View of the modern Alexander Nevsky Cathedral in the former 34th block, surrounded by Alexandrovsky Garden and the square

Since the early 2000s, there has been a proposal to rebuild a replica of the Alexander Nevsky Cathedral, previously located on Alexandrovskaya Square but demolished by Soviet authorities in 1932. Construction began in February 2016. The construction was completed in 2021, with Patriarch Kirill participating in the consecration of the rebuilt cathedral.

In June 2020, during landscaping work around the cathedral, the historic granite stands on Square of the Fallen Fighters were dismantled, and temporary structures are now used for parades. In September 2020, after reconstruction, the park in the stands area was opened as "Alexandrovsky Garden".

== Square in Culture ==
- One of the novels by Valentin Pikul is titled Square of the Fallen Fighters.
- Square of the Fallen Fighters and the silhouette of the unbuilt House of Soviets are depicted in a panorama in the star hall of the Volgograd Planetarium.
- The battles for the square are featured in one of the missions in the game Red Orchestra 2: Heroes of Stalingrad.
- In the game Battlefield 1: In the Name of the Tsar, the "Tsaritsyn" map features battles around the Alexander Nevsky Cathedral.

== Transport ==
Square of the Fallen Fighters is intersected by Mira Street, and is also adjoined by Volodarsky and Gogol Streets, all of which support vehicular traffic.

There are no public transport stops directly on Square of the Fallen Fighters itself. However, the square's southern side connects to Lenin Avenue, one of the city's main thoroughfares, which separates the square from Alley of Heroes. The following public transport stops are located in close proximity to the square:

- "Komsomolskaya" and "Alley of Heroes" (toward Voroshilovsky District);
- "Central Market" (toward Krasnooktyabrsky District);
- "Aeroflot Agency" (terminus, opposite the Medical University).

The nearest metrotram stations are Pionerskaya and Komsomolskaya. Additionally, approximately 400 meters from the square is the Volgograd I railway station, which serves long-distance and suburban trains.

== Bibliography ==
- Argastseva, S. A.; Gurenko, L. V.; Zhorova, E. P. (2004). Свод историко-архитектурного наследия Волгограда [Collection of Volgograd's Historical and Architectural Heritage] (in Russian). Волгоград: Панорама.
- Kovalyeva, G. N. (2016). "О классике волгоградской архитектуры послевоенного периода" [On the Classics of Volgograd's Post-War Architecture]. Символ науки (5—3 (17)): 217–221. ISSN 2410-700X.
- Oleinikov, P. P.; Antyufeev, A. V.; Ptichnikova, G. A.; Sharyga, N. P. (2011). "Формирование градостроительного ансамбля площади Павших Борцов в Сталинграде" [Formation of the Urban Ensemble of Fallen Fighters Square in Stalingrad]. Интернет-вестник ВолГАСУ. Сер.: Политематическая. 1 (15). ISSN 1994-0351.
- Yanushkina, Yu. V. (2013). "Архитектурные образы послевоенного Сталинграда" [Architectural Images of Post-War Stalingrad]. Интернет-вестник ВолГАСУ. Сер.: Политематическая. 1 (25). ISSN 1994-0351.
