= Trudovoy, Amur Oblast =

Trudovoy Трудовой
- Settlement
- Location within Amur Oblast Location within Russia
- Coordinates: 50°01′N 128°43′E
- Country: Russia
- Region: Amur Oblast
- District: Oktyabrsky District
- Time zone: UTC+9:00

Trudovoy (Russian: Трудовой) is a rural locality (a settlement) in Trudovoy Selsoviet of Oktyabrsky District, Amur Oblast, Russia. The population was 105 as of 2018. There are 11 streets.

== Geography ==
Trudovoy is located 57 km southwest of Yekaterinoslavka (the district's administrative centre) by road. Zaozyorny is the nearest rural locality.
