= Mukhinsky =

Mukhinsky Мухинский
- Settlement
- Location within Amur Oblast Location within Russia
- Coordinates: 50°15′N 128°40′E
- Country: Russia
- Region: Amur Oblast
- District: Oktyabrsky District
- Time zone: UTC+9:00

Mukhinsky (Russian: Мухинский) is a rural locality (a settlement) and the administrative center of Mukhinsky Selsoviet of Oktyabrsky District, Amur Oblast, Russia. The population was 572 as of 2018. There are 9 streets.

== Geography ==
Mukhinsky is located 39 km southwest of Yekaterinoslavka (the district's administrative centre) by road. Cheryomushki is the nearest rural locality.
