= Zaozerny, Amur Oblast =

Zaozerny Заозёрный
- Settlement
- Location within Amur Oblast Location within Russia
- Coordinates: 50°00′N 128°43′E
- Country: Russia
- Region: Amur Oblast
- District: Oktyabrsky District
- Time zone: UTC+9:00

Zaozerny (Russian: Заозёрный) is a rural locality (a settlement) in Trudovoy Selsoviet of Oktyabrsky District, Amur Oblast, Russia. The population was 63 as of 2018. There are 7 streets.

== Geography ==
Zaozerny is located 59 km southwest of Yekaterinoslavka (the district's administrative centre) by road. Trudovoy is the nearest rural locality.
