= Tomichi =

Tomichi Томичи
- Selo
- Location within Amur Oblast Location within Russia
- Coordinates: 50°46′N 128°14′E
- Country: Russia
- Region: Amur Oblast
- District: Belogorsky District
- Time zone: UTC+9:00

Tomichi (Russian: Томичи) is a rural locality (a selo) and the administrative center of Tomichevsky Selsoviet of Belogorsky District, Amur Oblast, Russia. The population was 1,419 as of 2018. There are 18 streets.

== Geography ==
Tomichi is located 33 km southwest of Belogorsk (the district's administrative centre) by road. Kustanayevka is the nearest rural locality.
