= Ivan Burmakov =

Soviet Army lieutenant general

Ivan Dmitrievich Burmakov
- Иван Дмитриевич Бурмаков
- Born: 11 November 1899; Pohoriltsi, Sosnitsky Uyezd, Chernigov Governorate, Russian Empire
- Died: 16 June 1973 (aged 73); Odessa
- Military career
- Allegiance: Soviet Union
- Branch: Soviet Army
- Service years: 1918–1955
- Rank: Lieutenant general
- Commands: 38th Motor Rifle Brigade 31st Guards Rifle Division; 29th Guards Mechanized Division; 21st Guards Mechanized Division 52nd Rifle Corps
- Conflicts: Russian Civil War; Polish-Soviet War; World War II; Battle of Stalingrad; Operation Bagration; Gumbinnen Operation; East Prussian Offensive
- Awards: Hero of the Soviet Union Order of Lenin (3) Order of the Red Banner (3)

Ivan Dmitrievich Burmakov (Russian: Иван Дмитриевич Бурмаков; 11 November 1899 – 16 June 1973) was a Soviet Army lieutenant general and Hero of the Soviet Union. Born in 1899 to a Ukrainian peasant family, he joined the Red Army in 1918. He fought in the Russian Civil War and the Polish–Soviet War. After graduating from the Red Commanders School, he became an officer. Burmakov rose through the ranks during the interwar period and in August 1942 became commander of the 38th Motor Rifle Brigade and fought in the Battle of Stalingrad. At the end of the battle, his troops captured 6th Army commander Friedrich Paulus. For its actions the brigade became the 7th Guards Motor Rifle Brigade. Burmakov was sent to the Military Academy of the General Staff and graduated in May 1944. He became commander of the 31st Guards Rifle Division in July 1944. Burmakov led the division in Operation Bagration, the Gumbinnen Operation, the East Prussian Offensive and the Battle of Königsberg. For his leadership, he was awarded the title Hero of the Soviet Union on 19 April 1945. Postwar, Burmakov continued to serve in the Soviet Army, leading the 29th and 21st Guards Mechanized Divisions and the 52nd Rifle Corps. After retiring in 1955, he lived in Odessa and died in 1973.

== Early life, Russian Civil War and Polish-Soviet War ==
Burmakov was born on 11 November 1899 in the village of Pohoriltsi in Chernigov Governorate to a peasant family. After graduating from high school, he worked in basketry workshops in the villages of Pohoriltsi and Topalevka.

In October 1918, Burmakov joined the Red Army. He was a soldier in the 4th Nizhyn Regiment of the 1st Insurgent Division. He fought in battles against the Ukrainian People's Army. The division was reorganized as the 44th Rifle Division and Burmakov became a machine gunner in its 388th Rifle Regiment. He then fought in battles against the White Army. In 1920, he participated in the Polish–Soviet War. Around this time, Burmakov joined the Communist Party of the Soviet Union.

== Interwar ==
From April 1921, Burmakov studied at the 2nd Kiev School of Red Commanders. In September 1922 the school was disbanded and students transferred to Kharkiv. In 1924 he graduated from the Kharkov Unified School of Red Commanders. From September, Burmakov was a platoon leader, company commander, chief of staff and battalion commander and finally assistant chief of staff of the 100th Rifle Division's 300th Rifle Regiment. In March 1932, he became assistant chief of staff of the 78th Rifle Division at Tomsk. From May 1933, Burmakov was chief of staff and then commander of the 18th Separate Rifle Battalion at Biysk. In November 1934 he became chief of staff of the 213th Rifle Regiment. In November 1937, he became regimental commander and was transferred to lead the 232nd Rifle Regiment. In August 1939, Burmakov became chief of staff of the 102nd Rifle Division at Kansk. In January 1940, he was the assistant chief of the Kansk Infantry School. Burmakov became deputy head of the Kemerovo Infantry School in November. He graduated from the second year of night courses at the Frunze Military Academy.

== World War II ==
In the fall of 1941 Burmakov became acting commander of the Kemerovo Infantry School. From December 1941, he was chief of staff of a newly forming rifle division in Krasnoyarsk. In April 1942 he became commander of the 5th Destroyer Brigade at Alabino, Moscow Oblast. In August 1942, Burmakov became commander of the 38th Motor Rifle Brigade, formed from Stalingrad Factory Workers. He fought in the Battle of Stalingrad. In late August, the brigade fought on Stalingrad's southern outskirts. In September, the brigade fought in the Elshanka area and became part of the 62nd Army. In the final stages of the Battle of Stalingrad, the brigade was part of the 64th Army. The brigade captured 6th Army commander Friedrich Paulus in the basement of the Univermag department store. In March 1943, the brigade became the 7th Guards Stalingrad Motor Rifle Brigade for its actions. On 1 March Burmakov was promoted to major general. On 1 April, he was awarded the Order of Lenin.

In May 1943, Burmakov was sent to study at the Military Academy of the General Staff. In 1944, he graduated from an accelerated course at the school. In May, he was appointed deputy commander of the 16th Guards Rifle Corps of the 11th Guards Army. In July 1944 he became commander of the 31st Guards Rifle Division of the corps. He led the division during Operation Bagration. On 24 September, he was awarded the Order of the Red Banner. In October, the division fought in the Gumbinnen Operation. From January 1945, the division fought in the East Prussian Offensive. In April, it fought in the Battle of Königsberg. On 6 April, the first day of the attack on the city, the division broke through German defenses in the southwest. By the end of the second day, the division reached the Pregolya River, crossed it and seized a bridgehead. During the battle, the division captured or destroyed 96 guns, 18 tanks and self-propelled guns, and a large amount of German supplies and equipment. On 19 April Burmakov was awarded the title Hero of the Soviet Union and the Order of Lenin for his leadership.

== Postwar ==
After the end of the war, Burmakov continued his military service. In December 1945, the 31st Guards Rifle Division was converted into the 29th Guards Mechanized Division. In January 1948, he became commander of the 21st Guards Mechanized Division at Ohrdruf and then Halle. In June 1950 he returned to the Military Academy of the General Staff and graduated in 1951. From July 1951, he led the Odessa Infantry School. In January 1954, Burmakov was appointed commander of the 52nd Rifle Corps at Pervomaiske, Mykolaiv Oblast. On 31 May, he was promoted to lieutenant general. In April 1955, he retired. Burmakov lived and worked in Odessa and died on 16 June 1973. He was buried in the city's Second Christian Cemetery.

== Legacy ==
A street in Volgograd (formerly Stalingrad) is named for Burmakov.
