= Cheryomushki, Bryansk Oblast =

Cheryomushki Черёмушки
- Settlement
- Location within Bryansk Oblast Location within Russia
- Coordinates: 52°54′N 34°25′E
- Country: Russia
- Region: Bryansk Oblast
- District: Navlinsky District
- Time zone: UTC+3:00

Cheryomushki (Russian: Черёмушки) is a rural locality (a settlement) in Navlinsky District, Bryansk Oblast, Russia. The population was 52 as of 2010. There is 1 street.

== Geography ==
Cheryomushki is located 20 km north of Navlya (the district's administrative centre) by road. Pakhar is the nearest rural locality.
