= Zaozerny, Altai Krai =

Zaozerny Заозёрный
- Settlement
- Location within Altai Krai Location within Russia
- Coordinates: 52°32′N 85°29′E
- Country: Russia
- Region: Altai Krai
- District: Biysky District
- Time zone: UTC+7:00

Zaozerny (Russian: Заозёрный) is a rural locality (a settlement) in Svetloozyorsky Selsoviet, Biysky District, Altai Krai, Russia. The population was 231 as of 2013. There are 2 streets.

== Geography ==
Zaozerny is located 33 km east of Biysk (the district's administrative centre) by road. Svetloozyorskoye is the nearest rural locality.
