= Novye Cheryomushki =

Novye Cheryomushki may refer to:

- Novye Cheryomushki (neighborhood), Moscow
- Informal reference to the Ninth Quarter of Novye Cheryomushki, Moscow, Russia
- Novye Cheryomushki (Moscow Metro), Moscow
