= Trudovaya =

Trudovaya Трудовая
- Settlement
- Interactive map of Trudovaya
- Location of Trudovaya Trudovaya (Moscow Oblast)
- Coordinates: 56°06′58″N 37°31′02″E
- Country: Russia
- Federal subject: Moscow Oblast
- Founded: 1945

Population
  - Estimate (2005): 62 )

Municipal status
  - Municipal district: Mytishchinsky District
  - Rural settlement: Fedoskinskoye Rural Settlement
- Time zone: UTC+3 (MSK)
- Postal code: 141052
- OKTMO ID: 46746000496

Trudovaya (Russian: Трудовая) is a rural locality (a settlement) in Mytishchinsky District of Moscow Oblast, Russia, located 26 kilometers (16 mi) northwest from Mytishchi (the district's administrative centre). Population: 62 (2005 est.).
