= Trudovoye, Voronezh Oblast =

Trudovoye Трудовое
- Settlement
- Location within Voronezh Oblast Location within Russia
- Coordinates: 51°45′N 39°44′E
- Country: Russia
- Region: Voronezh Oblast
- District: Novousmansky District
- Time zone: UTC+3:00

Trudovoye (Russian: Трудовое) is a rural locality (a settlement) and the administrative center of Trudovskoye Rural Settlement, Novousmansky District, Voronezh Oblast, Russia. The population was 512 as of 2010. There are 11 streets.

== Geography ==
Trudovoye is located 30 km northeast of Novaya Usman (the district's administrative centre) by road. Andreyevka is the nearest rural locality.
