= Trudovoye, Primorsky Krai =

Rural locality in Primorsky Krai, Russia

Coordinates: 43°17′56″N 132°03′49″E

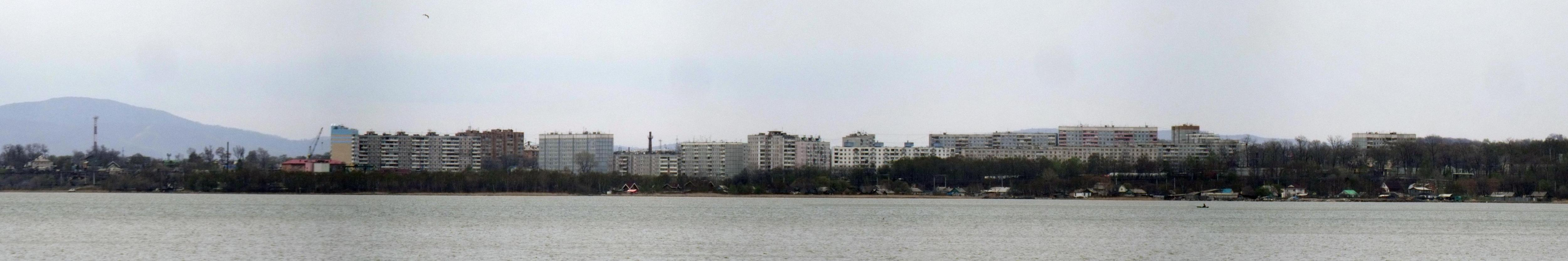
Trudovoye Panorama

Trudovoye (Russian: Трудово́е, lit. labor) is a large rural locality (a village) under the administrative jurisdiction of Frunzensky City District of Vladivostok City Under Krai Jurisdiction in Primorsky Krai, Russia. It is located on the Amur Bay 33 kilometers (21 mi) northeast of Vladivostok. Population: 18,522 (2010 census); 18,935 (2002 census); 17,278 (1989 Soviet census).

== History ==
It was established in 1890 and was granted urban-type settlement status in 1943. In December 2004, it was demoted in status back to that of a rural locality.

== Economy ==
There is a brick-yard and several coal mines in the settlement.

=== Transportation ===
Trudovoye is also an important railway station on the Khabarovsk-Vladivostok line.

== Demographics ==
As of the 2010 Census, Trudovoye is the most populated rural locality in both the Far Eastern Federal District of Russia and in Asian Russia.
