= Yekaterinoslavka, Amur Oblast =

Rural locality in Russia

Coordinates: 50.372°N 129.112°E

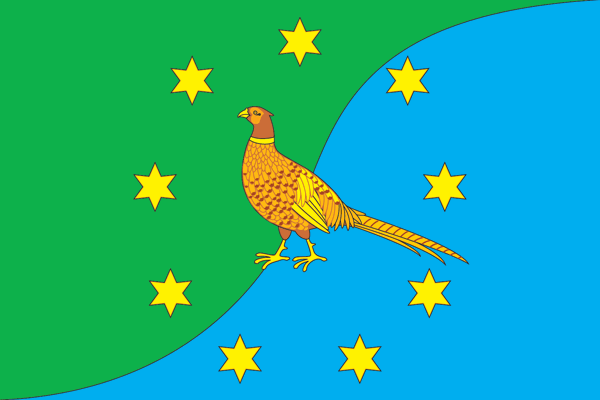
Flag of Yekaterinoslavka

Yekaterinoslavka (Russian: Екатериносла́вка) is a rural locality (a selo) and the administrative center of Oktyabrsky District of Amur Oblast, Russia. Population: 9,723 (2010 census); 10,584 (2002 census); 9,197 (1989 Soviet census).

It is home to units of the 38th Guards Motor Rifle Brigade of the Eastern Military District.
