= Oktyabrsky District, Amur Oblast =

Oktyabrsky District Октябрьский район (Russian)
- District
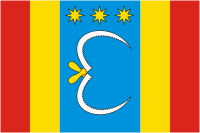
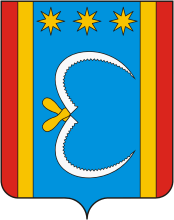
- Flag Coat of arms
- Location of Oktyabrsky District in Amur Oblast
- Coordinates: 50°23′N 129°05′E
- Country: Russia
- Federal subject: Amur Oblast
- Established: 25 January 1935
- Administrative center: Yekaterinoslavka

Area
  - Total: 3,381 km^{2} (1,305 sq mi)

Population (2010 Census)
  - Total: 19,679
  - Density: 5.820/km^{2} (15.07/sq mi)
  - Urban: 0%
  - Rural: 100%

Administrative structure
  - Administrative divisions: 14 Rural settlements
  - Inhabited localities: 35 rural localities

Municipal structure
  - Municipally incorporated as: Oktyabrsky Municipal District
  - Municipal divisions: 0 urban settlements, 14 rural settlements
- Time zone: UTC+9 (MSK+6)
- OKTMO ID: 10638000
- Website: http://www.oktyabr-r.ru

Oktyabrsky District (Russian: Октя́брьский райо́н) is an administrative and municipal district (raion), one of the twenty in Amur Oblast, Russia. The area of the district is 3,381 square kilometers (1,305 sq mi). Its administrative center is the rural locality (a selo) of Yekaterinoslavka. Population: 19,679 (2010 Census); 22,761 (2002 Census); 23,127 (1989 Soviet census). The population of Yekaterinoslavka accounts for 49.4% of the district's total population.
