= List of guards units of Russia =

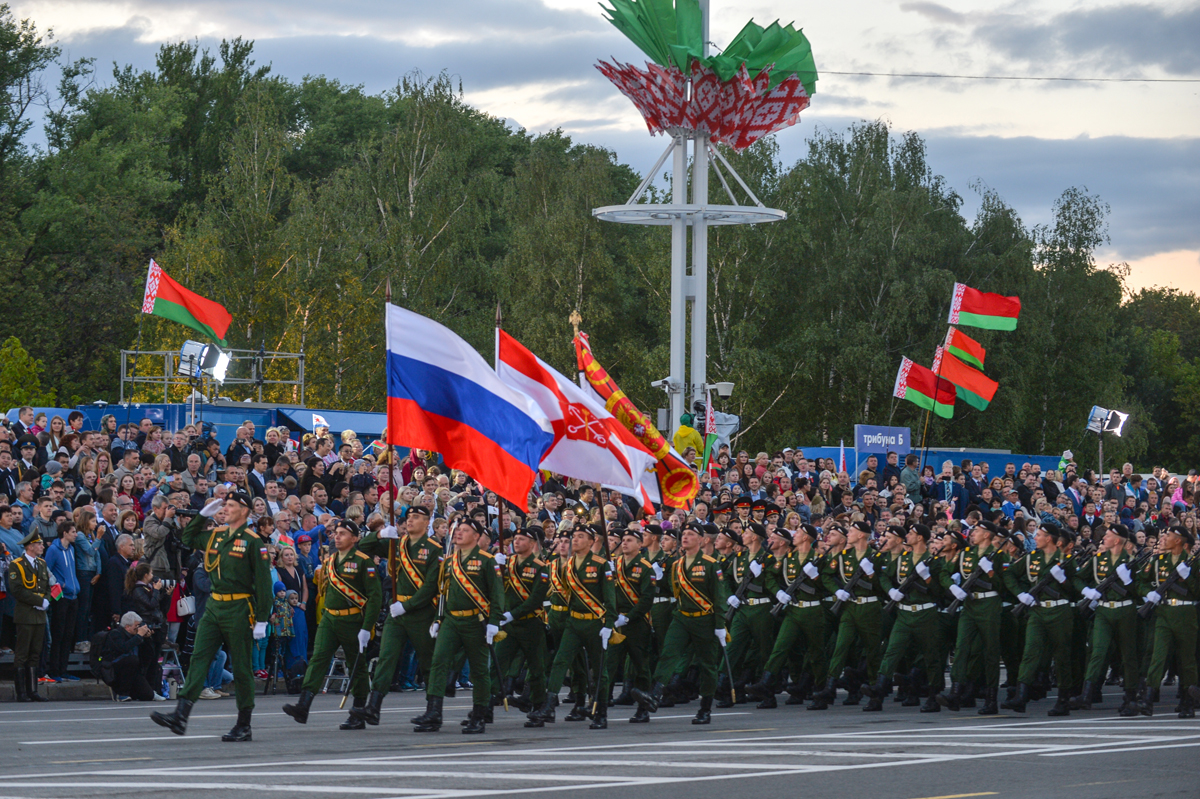
The 4th Guards Tank Division at the 2019 Minsk Independence Day Parade.

The Armed Forces of the Russian Federation has a large number of Guards units.

== Ground Forces ==
=== Guards Armies ===
- 1st Guards Tank Army
- 2nd Guards Combined Arms Army
- 3rd Guards Combined Arms Army
- 5th Guards Combined Arms Army
- 6th Guards Combined Arms Army
- 8th Guards Combined Arms Army
- 20th Guards Combined Arms Army
- 29th Guards Combined Arms Army
- 35th Guards Combined Arms Army
- 36th Guards Combined Arms Army
- 41st Guards Combined Arms Army
- 51st Guards Donetsk Combined Arms Army
- 58th Guards Combined Arms Army

=== Guards Divisions ===
==== Motor Rifle ====
- 2nd Guards Taman Motor Rifle Division
- 18th Guards Insterburg Motor Rifle Division
- 20th Guards Carpathian-Berlin Motor Rifle Division
- 27th Guards Omsk-Novobug Motor Rifle Division
- 42nd Guards Yevpatoria Motor Rifle Division
- 68th Guards Sevastopol Motor Rifle Division named after Latvian Riflemen
- 69th Guards Krasnoe Selo Motor Rifle Division
- 71st Guards Pechenga Motor Rifle Division
- 144th Guards Yelnya Motor Rifle Division
- 150th Guards Idritsa-Berlin Motor Rifle Division

==== Tank ====
- 4th Guards Kantemirovka Tank Division
- 90th Guards Vitebsk-Novgorod Tank Division

=== Guards Brigades ===
==== Motor Rifle ====
- 1st Separate Guards Slavyansk Motor Rifle Brigade
- 4th Separate Guards Motor Rifle Brigade
- 5th Separate Guards Motor Rifle Brigade
- 6th Separate Guards Motor Rifle Brigade
- 7th Separate Guards Motor Rifle Brigade
- 9th Separate Guards Motor Rifle Brigade
- 15th Separate Guards Alexandria Motor Rifle Brigade
- 27th Separate Guards Sevastopol Motor Rifle Brigade
- 30th Separate Guards Motor Rifle Brigade
- 34th Separate Guards Motor Rifle Brigade
- 35th Separate Guards Stalingrad-Kiev Motor Rifle Brigade
- 36th Separate Guards Lozovaya Motor Rifle Brigade
- 37th Separate Guards Budapest Don Cossack Motor Rifle Brigade
- 38th Separate Guards Vitebsk Motor Rifle Brigade
- 39th Separate Guards Motor Rifle Brigade
- 55th Separate Guards Motor Rifle Brigade
- 57th Separate Guards Krasnograd Motor Rifle Brigade
- 64th Separate Guards Motor Rifle Brigade
- 74th Separate Guards Zvenigorod-Berlin Motor Rifle Brigade
- 110th Separate Guards Motor Rifle Brigade
- 114th Separate Guards Motor Rifle Brigade
- 123rd Separate Guards Motor Rifle Brigade
- 132nd Separate Guards Motor Rifle Brigade
- 136th Uman-Berlin Separate Guards Motor Rifle Brigade
- 205th Separate Guards Motor Rifle Brigade

==== Tank ====
- 5th Separate Guards Tatsinskaya Tank Brigade

==== Engineer ====
- 1st Guards Brest-Berlin Engineer-Sapper Brigade
- 11th Separate Guards Kingisepp Engineer Brigade
- 12th Separate Guards Koenigsberg-Gorodok Engineer Brigade
- 14th Separate Guards Baranovichi Engineer Brigade
- 28th Guards Pontoon-Bridge Brigade
- 45th Guards Berlin Engineer Brigade

==== Artillery ====
- 9th Guards Kielce-Berlin Artillery Brigade
- 14th Separate Guards Artillery Brigade
- 17th Guards High Power Artillery Brigade
- 30th Guards Artillery Brigade
- 79th Guards Novozybkov Rocket Artillery Brigade
- 120th Guards Artillery Brigade
- 165th Guards Artillery Brigade
- 200th Guards Artillery Brigade
- 227th Guards Artillery Brigade
- 232nd Guards Rocket Artillery Brigade
- 236th Guards Artillery Brigade
- 238th Guards Artillery Brigade
- 244th Separate Guards Neman Artillery Brigade
- 288th Guards Warsaw Artillery Brigade
- 291st Guards Artillery Brigade
- 305th Guards Artillery Brigade
- 338th Guards Dvinsk Rocket Artillery Brigade
- 385th Guards Odessa Artillery Brigade
- 439th Guards Perekop Rocket Artillery Brigade

==== Anti-Aircraft Missile ====
- 8th Guards Šavli Anti-Aircraft Missile Brigade
- 35th Guards Anti-Aircraft Missile Brigade
- 38th Guards Anti-Aircraft Missile Brigade
- 49th Guards Anti-Aircraft Missile Brigade
- 53rd Guards Anti-Aircraft Missile Brigade
- 61st Guards Anti-Aircraft Missile Brigade
- 71st Guards Anti-Aircraft Missile Brigade
- 77th Guards Anti-Aircraft Missile Brigade
- 78th Guards Anti-Aircraft Missile Brigade
- 140th Guards Anti-Aircraft Missile Brigade
- 297th Guards Anti-Aircraft Missile Brigade

==== Missile ====
- 1st Guards Orsha Missile Brigade
- 12th Guards Missile Brigade
- 20th Guards Berlin Missile Brigade
- 92nd Guards Missile Brigade
- 107th Guards Mozyr Missile Brigade
- 112th Guards Novorossiysk Missile Brigade
- 119th Guards Missile Brigade
- 152nd Guards Brest-Warsaw Missile Brigade

==== NBC Protection ====
- 1st Mobile NBC Protection Brigade
- 16th Separate Guards Khingan NBC Protection Brigade
- 27th Separate Guards NBC Protection Brigade
- 29th Separate Guards NBC Protection Brigade

==== Signal Troops ====
- 9th Guards Lvov-Berlin Communications Brigade
- 35th Guards Tallin Communications Brigade
- 54th Guards Communications Brigade
- 59th Guards Syvash Communications Brigade
- 75th Guards Communications Brigade
- 175th Guards Luninets-Pinsk Communications Brigade

=== Guards Regiments ===
==== Motor Rifle ====
- 1st Guards Motor Rifle Regiment
- 7th Separate Guards Proletarian Moscow-Minsk Motor Rifle Regiment
- 15th Guards Šavli Motor Rifle Regiment
- 33rd Guards Motor Rifle Regiment
- 57th Guards Motor Rifle Regiment
- 70th Guards Motor Rifle Regiment
- 71st Guards Motor Rifle Regiment
- 102nd Guards Slonim-Pomerania Motor Rifle Regiment
- 103rd Guards Motor Rifle Regiment
- 114th Guards Motor Rifle Regiment
- 143rd Guards Motor Rifle Regiment
- 228th Guards Leningrad-Pavlovsk Motor Rifle Regiment
- 242nd Guards Motor Rifle Regiment
- 245th Guards Motor Rifle Regiment
- 252nd Guards Motor Rifle Regiment
- 255th Guards Motor Rifle Regiment
- 291st Guards Motor Rifle Regiment
- 394th Guards Motor Rifle Regiment
- 433rd Guards Motor Rifle Regiment
- 488th Guards Simferopol Motor Rifle Regiment
- 752nd Guards Petrokov Motor Rifle Regiment
- 1307th Guards Motor Rifle Regiment
- 1429th Guards Motor Rifle Regiment
- 1430th Guards Motor Rifle Regiment
- 1442nd Guards Motor Rifle Regiment
- 1466th Guards Motor Rifle Regiment
- 1472nd Guards Motor Rifle Regiment
- 1486th Guards Motor Rifle Regiment

==== Tank ====
- 1st Guards Chertkov Tank Regiment
- 6th Guards Tank Regiment
- 10th Guards Tank Regiment
- 13th Guards Shepetovka Tank Regiment
- 80th Guards Tank Regiment
- 218th Guards Tank Regiment
- 239th Guards Orenburg Cossack Tank Regiment

==== Engineer ====
- 6th Guards Engineer-Sapper Regiment
- 30th Guards Engineer-Sapper Regiment
- 31st Guards Engineer-Sapper Regiment
- 32nd Guards Engineer-Sapper Regiment
- 39th Guards Engineer-Sapper Regiment
- 40th Guards Engineer-Sapper Regiment
- 44th Guards Engineer-Sapper Regiment
- 89th Guards Sapper Regiment
- 91st Guards Sapper Regiment

==== Artillery ====
- 8th Guards Artillery Regiment
- 27th Guards Artillery Regiment
- 50th Guards Self-Propelled Artillery Regiment
- 99th Guards Self-Propelled Artillery Regiment
- 136th Guards Artillery Regiment
- 292nd Guards Self-Propelled Artillery Regiment
- 944th Guards Self-Propelled Artillery Regiment

==== Anti-Aircraft Missile ====
- 77th Guards Anti-Aircraft Missile Regiment
- 568th Guards Anti-Aircraft Missile Regiment
- 1488th Guards Anti-Aircraft Missile Regiment

==== NBC Protection ====
- 2nd Guards NBC Protection Regiment
- 10th Guards NBC Protection Regiment
- 25th Guards NBC Protection Regiment
- 26th Guards NBC Protection Regiment
- 35th Guards NBC Protection Regiment

=== Other Guards units ===
- 10th Separate Guards Tank Battalion
- 17th Separate Guards Electronic Warfare Brigade
- 60th Separate Guards Assault Motor Rifle Battalion
- 80th Separate Guards Reconnaissance Battalion
- 100th Separate Guards Reconnaissance Brigade
- 127th Separate Guards Reconnaissance Brigade
- 212th Guards District Training Center
- 467th Guards Moscow-Tartu District Training Center
- 4th Guards Military Base
- 201st Guards Gatchina Military Base

=== Disbanded Guards units ===
- 8th Separate Guards Kramatorsk Motor Rifle Brigade
- 10th Separate Guards Ural-Lvov Volunteer Tank Division
- 47th Guards Lower Dnieper Tank Division

== Aerospace Forces ==
=== Guards Armies ===
- 4th Guards Air and Air Defence Forces Army
- 6th Guards Leningrad Air and Air Defence Forces Army
- 11th Guards Air and Air Defence Forces Army

=== Guards Divisions ===
- 1st Guards Mixed Aviation Division
- 22nd Guards Heavy Bomber Aviation Division
- 105th Guards Mixed Aviation Division
- 303rd Guards Mixed Aviation Division

=== Guards Brigades ===
- 16th Guards Army Aviation Brigade
- 17th Guards Army Aviation Brigade
- 18th Guards Army Aviation Brigade
- 39th Separate Guards Special Purpose Radio-technical Brigade

=== Guards Regiments ===
- 2nd Guards Mixed Aviation Regiment
- 14th Guards Fighter Aviation Regiment
- 18th Guards Assault Aviation Regiment
- 22nd Guards Fighter Aviation Regiment
- 23rd Guards Fighter Aviation Regiment
- 39th Separate Guards Helicopter Regiment
- 43rd Separate Guards Sevastopol Naval Assault Aviation Regiment
- 47th Guards Bomber Aviation Regiment
- 55th Separate Guards Sevastopol Helicopter Regiment
- 98th Separate Guards Mixed Aviation Regiment
- 120th Guards Fighter Aviation Regiment
- 121st Guards Heavy Bomber Aviation Regiment
- 159th Guards Fighter Aviation Regiment
- 266th Separate Guards Assault Aviation Regiment
- 277th Guards Mlawa Bomber Aviation Regiment
- 314th Separate Guards Special Purpose Radio-Technical Regiment
- 332nd Separate Guards Helicopter Regiment
- 337th Separate Guards Helicopter Regiment
- 368th Guards Assault Aviation Regiment
- 440th Separate Guards Helicopter Regiment
- 559th Guards Bomber Aviation Regiment
- 689th Guards Fighter Aviation Regiment
- 960th Guards Assault Aviation Regiment
- 968th Research and Instructor Mixed Aviation Regiment
- 999th Guards Air Base
- 6950th Guards Air Base

=== Disbanded Guards units ===
- 1st Guards Fighter Aviation Regiment
- 18th Guards Fighter Aviation Regiment
- 19th Guards Fighter Aviation Regiment
- 28th Guards Fighter Aviation Regiment
- 31st Guards Fighter Aviation Regiment
- 42nd Guards Bomber Aviation Regiment
- 54th Guards Fighter Aviation Regiment
- 73rd Guards Fighter Aviation Regiment
- 458th Guards Fighter Aviation Regiment
- 627th Guards Fighter Aviation Training Regiment
- 899th Guards Assault Aviation Regiment
- 6980th Guards Air Base

== Airborne Forces ==
=== Guards Divisions ===
- 7th Guards Air Assault Division
- 76th Guards Air Assault Division
- 98th Guards Airborne Division
- 104th Guards Air Assault Division
- 106th Guards Airborne Division

=== Guards Brigades ===
- 11th Guards Air Assault Brigade
- 52nd Guards Artillery Brigade
- 56th Guards Air Assault Brigade
- 83rd Guards Air Assault Brigade
- 38th Guards Separate Communications Brigade
- 45th Guards Separate Guards Special Purpose Brigade

=== Guards Regiments ===
- 51st Guards Airborne Regiment
- 56th Guards Air Assault Regiment
- 104th Guards Air Assault Regiment
- 108th Guards Air Assault Regiment
- 137th Guards Ryazan Kuban Cossack Airborne Regiment
- 217th Guards Airborne Regiment
- 234th Guards Air Assault Regiment
- 237th Guards Torun Air Assault Regiment
- 247th Guards Caucasus Cossack Air Assault Regiment
- 299th Guards Airborne Regiment
- 328th Guards Air Assault Regiment
- 331st Guards Airborne Regiment
- 337th Guards Air Assault Regiment

== Navy ==
=== Guards formations of the Coastal Troops and Naval Infantry ===
- 55th Guards Kursk Naval Infantry Division
- 120th Guards Belostok Naval Infantry Division
- 40th Separate Guards Kransodar-Harbin Naval Infantry Brigade
- 61st Separate Guards Kirkenes Naval Infantry Brigade
- 126th Separate Guards Coastal Defence Brigade
- 810th Separate Guards Naval Infantry Brigade
- 15th Guards Coastal Missile Brigade
- 177th Separate Guards Naval Infantry Regiment
- 22nd Separate Guards Air Defence Missile Regiment
- 69th Separate Guards Mogilev Marine Engineering Regiment

=== Guards ships of the Navy ===
- Guards frigate Admiral Makarov
- Guards cruiser Varyag
- Guards corvette Soobrazitelny

==== Out of commission ====
- Guards destroyer Gremyashchy
- Guards destroyer Bezuderzhny
- Guards cruiser Moskva

== Special Forces ==
=== Main Directorate of the General Staff ===
- 2nd Separate Guards Special Purpose Brigade
- 3rd Guards Warsaw-Berlin Special Purpose Brigade
- 10th Separate Guards Special Purpose Brigade
- 14th Separate Guards Special Purpose Brigade
- 22nd Separate Guards Special Purpose Brigade
- 24th Separate Guards Special Purpose Brigade
- 346th Separate Guards Special Purpose Brigade
- 25th Separate Guards Special Purpose Regiment

=== Special Operations Forces ===
- Guards Special Operations Center "Kubinka-2"

== Strategic Rocket Forces ==
=== Guards Rocket Armies ===
- 27th Guards Vitebsk Rocket Army
- 33rd Guards Berislav Khingan Rocket Army

=== Guards Rocket Divisions ===
- 7th Guards Rocket Division
- 28th Guards Rocket Division
- 29th Guards Rocket Division
- 39th Guards Rocket Division
- 54th Guards Rocket Division
