= Pokrovsk offensive order of battle =

== Russian forces ==
- Russian Armed Forces
  - Russian Ground Forces
    - 2nd Guards Combined Arms Army - Major General Vyacheslav Gurov
      - 15th Separate Guards Motor Rifle Brigade - Lieutenant Colonel Andrei Sergeevich Marushkin
        - 1437th Motorized Rifle Regiment
      - 27th Guards Motor Rifle Division - Colonel Dmitri Zavyalov
        - 433rd Motorized Rifle Regiment
        - 506th Motorized Rifle Regiment
          - Typhoon Detachment
        - 589th Motorized Rifle Regiment
      - 30th Separate Guards Motor Rifle Brigade
      - 385th Guards Artillery Brigade
    - 41st Guards Combined Arms Army - Lieutenant General Sergey Ryzhkov
      - 35th Separate Guards Motor Rifle Brigade - Oleg Vladimirovich Kurygin
        - 3rd "Atlant" Motor Rifle Battalion
        - "Veles" Battalion
      - 55th Mountain Motor Rifle Brigade - Colonel Denis Barilo
      - 74th Separate Guards Motor Rifle Brigade
      - 90th Guards Tank Division - Colonel Ramil Rakhmatulovich Ibatullin
        - 6th Guards Lvov Tank Regiment
        - 80th Guards Tank Regiment
        - 228th Guards Motor Rifle Regiment
        - 239th Guards Tank Regiment
        - 438th Motor Rifle Regiment
        - 30th Separate Reconnaissance Battalion
      - 75th Motor Rifle Brigade
      - 119th Missile Brigade
      - 120th Artillery Brigade
    - 8th Guards Combined Arms Army
      - 20th Guards Motor Rifle Division
        - 255th Motorized Rifle Regiment
        - 33rd Motorized Rifle Regiment
        - 242nd Motorized Rifle Regiment
      - 255th Motorized Rifle Brigade
      - 238th Artillery Brigade
      - 150th Guards Motor Rifle Division
        - 68th Tank Regiment
        - 102nd Slonim-Pomeranian Motorized Rifle Regiment
        - 103rd Motorized Rifle Regiment
    - 51st Guards Combined Arms Army - Lieutenant General Sergei Milchakov
      - 1st Separate Guards Motor Rifle Brigade
        - 1st Motorized Rifle Battalion
        - 86th Separate Rifle Regiment
        - 87th Separate Rifle Regiment
        - 1453rd Regiment
      - 114th Separate Guards Motor Rifle Brigade - Yuri Zazykin
      - Pyatnashka Brigade - Akhra Avidzba (Note: The unit was withdrawn and transferred to Kursk by 12 August 2024)
      - 5th Separate Guards Motor Rifle Brigade
      - 9th Separate Guards Motor Rifle Brigade - Timur Kurilkin
        - 60th Separate Guards Motor Rifle Battalion
      - 110th Separate Guards Motor Rifle Brigade
      - 132nd Separate Guards Motor Rifle Brigade
      - Sparta Battalion
      - 56th Spetsnaz Battalion
      - 1487th Motorized Rifle Regiment
    - 68th Guards Army Corps - Lieutenant General Dmitry Glushenkov
      - 18th Machine Gun Artillery Division
      - 39th Separate Guards Motor Rifle Brigade
    - Unknown subordination
      - "Fregat" battalion
      - "Maxim Krivonos" volunteer detachment
      - "Mora" detachment
      - 506th Motor Rifle Regiment
      - 71st Separate Spetsnaz Brigade
      - "Borz" assault battalion
      - "Storm" assault battalion
      - "Smuglyanka" detachment
      - "Vizantiya" detachment
      - "Vanya Ivanov" Group
      - AIRNOMAD Detachment
  - GRU
    - Spetsnaz GRU
      - 3rd Guards Spetsnaz Brigade - Guards Col. Albert Ibragimovich Omarov
      - 24th Separate Guards Special Forces Brigade
        - "Vega" Spetsnaz Detachment
  - Russian Aerospace Forces
    - Russian Air Force
  - Russian Navy
    - Russian Naval Infantry - Lt. Gen. Viktor Astapov
      - 810th Guards Naval Infantry Brigade - Colonel Aleksey Borisovich Berngard (Note: The unit was transferred to Kursk on 12 August 2024)
  - Unmanned Systems Forces
    - Center for Advanced Unmanned Technologies "Rubicon"
    - Special Purpose Center "Bars-Sarmat"

== Ukrainian forces ==
- Armed Forces of Ukraine
  - Ukrainian Ground Forces
    - 47th Mechanised Brigade - Col. Yan Yatsishen (Note: Transferred to Kursk in late September 2024)
    - 33rd Mechanized Brigade - Col. Ivan Voitenko
    - 100th Mechanized Brigade - Col. Ruslan Tkachuk
    - 115th Mechanized Brigade - Ihor Ivanov (Note: The brigade was later transferred to Kursk)
    - 117th Mechanized Brigade (became the 117th Heavy Mechanized Brigade in 2024)
    - Skala Regiment - Major Yuriy Harkaviy ″Skala″
    - 5th Assault Brigade - Lieutenant Colonel Oleksandr Yakovenko
      - Aidar Battalion
    - 31st Mechanized Brigade
    - 110th Mechanized Brigade - Mykola Chumak
      - Unknown blocking detachment
    - 152nd Jaeger Brigade
    - 57th Motorized Brigade - Denys Yaroslavsky
      - 420th Rifle Battalion - Colonel Serhiy Lipsky † (Note: Disbanded on 19 November 2024)
    - 59th Motorized Brigade - Vadym Sukharevsky (reformed as the 59th Assault Brigade)
      - 11th Separate Motorized Infantry Battalion - Valeryi Vovk
      - 108th Motorized Battalion - Serhii Filimonov
    - 53rd Mechanized Brigade
    - 54th Mechanized Brigade - Oleksiy Maistrenko
    - 55th Artillery Brigade - Roman Kachur
    - 93rd Mechanized Brigade - Col. Pavlo Palisa
    - 151st Mechanized Brigade - V. Samoilenko
    - 14th Mechanized Brigade - Lieutenant Colonel Vasyl Lapchuk †
    - 68th Jaeger Brigade - Oleksiy Shum
    - 155th Mechanized Brigade - Colonel Dmytro Ryumshin (until 12 December); Colonel Taras Maksymov (after 12 December) (Note: Destroyed and disbanded on 4 January 2025)
    - 33rd Assault Battalion
    - 157th Mechanized Brigade
    - International Legion
      - 2nd International Legion
    - Rocket Forces and Artillery
      - 38th Separate Artillery Brigade
  - Ukrainian Marine Corps
    - 35th Marine Brigade - Yuriy Andriyenko
    - 37th Marine Brigade - Vitaliy Napkhanenko
    - 38th Marine Brigade - Lt. Col. Yevheniy Bova
    - 43rd Artillery Brigade - Oleh Shevchuk
  - Ukrainian Air Assault Forces
    - 7th Rapid Response Corps
      - 79th Air Assault Brigade - Col. Oleksandr Lutsenko
    - 46th Airmobile Brigade - Col. Valeriy Skred
  - Territorial Defence Forces
    - 117th Territorial Defense Brigade
    - 120th Territorial Defense Brigade - Colonel Yurii Paradiuk
      - 210th Territorial Defense Battalion
    - 123rd Territorial Defense Brigade - Col. Roman Viktorovych Tokarenko
      - 48th Separate Assault Battalion
    - Ukrainian Volunteer Army
  - Unmanned Systems Forces
    - 59th Assault Brigade - Col. Oleksandr Sak
      - 11th Separate Motorized Infantry Battalion - Valeryi Vovk
      - 108th Assault Battalion - Serhii Filimonov
      - Shkval Battalion - "Oleksandr"

National Police of Ukraine

- National Guard of Ukraine
  - 1st Azov Corps
    - Azov Brigade - Denys Prokopenko
    - 14th Chervona Kalyna Brigade
    - Kara-Dag Brigade - Colonel Ivan Bondarenko

Main Directorate of Intelligence - Kyrylo Buhdanov
