= Roshchinsky =

Roshchinsky (masculine), Roshchinskaya (feminine), or Roshchinskoye (neuter) may refer to:

- Roshchinsky Urban Settlement, a municipal formation which the urban-type settlement of Roshchinsky in Volzhsky District of Samara Oblast, Russia is incorporated as
- Roshchinskoye Urban Settlement, a municipal formation corresponding to Roshchinskoye Settlement Municipal Formation, an administrative division of Vyborgsky District of Leningrad Oblast, Russia
- Roshchinsky (inhabited locality) (Roshchinskaya, Roshchinskoye), several inhabited localities in Russia
- Roshchinskoye, Kazakhstan, a village near Zhamantuz, a lake in Taiynsha District, North Kazakhstan Region

== See also ==
- Roshchino
