= Russian peacekeeping forces =

Russian peacekeeping forces may refer to:

- 15th Separate Guards Motor Rifle Brigade
- Operational Group of Russian Forces
