= 30th Separate Guards Motor Rifle Brigade =

Russian Ground Forces formation

- 30-я отдельная гвардейская мотострелковая бригада
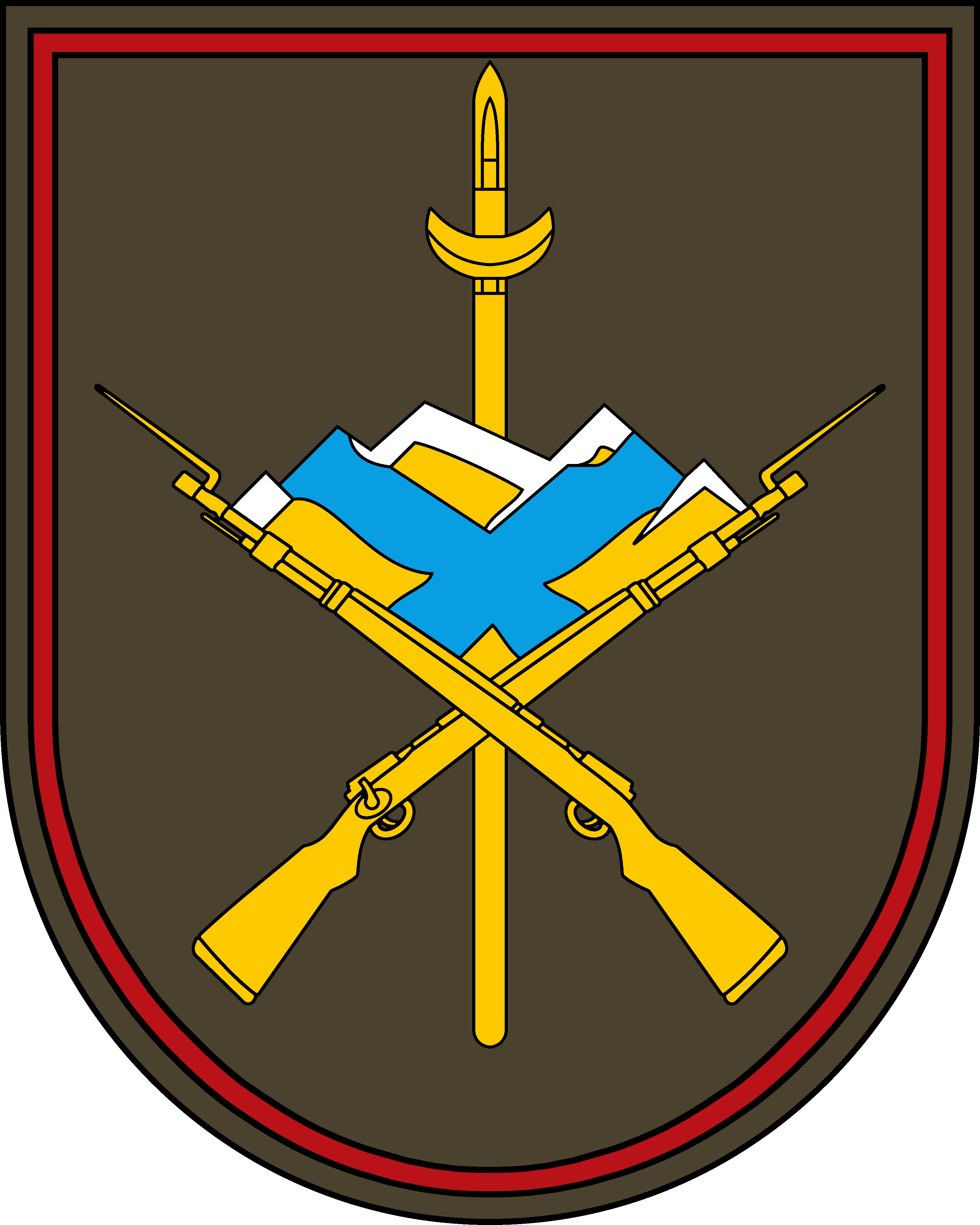
- Sleeve patch of the brigade
- Active: 30 November 2016 – present
- Country: Russia
- Branch: Russian Ground Forces
- Type: Motorized infantry
- Size: Brigade
- Part of: 2nd Guards Combined Arms Army
- Garrison/HQ: Roshchinsky, Samara Oblast
- Engagements: Russian intervention in Syria; Russian invasion of Ukraine; Battle of Sievierodonetsk (2022); Battle of Svatove; Battle of Avdiivka (2023–2024); Battle of Ocheretyne; Pokrovsk offensive
- Decorations: Guards

The 30th Separate Guards Motor Rifle Brigade (Russian: 30-я отдельная гвардейская мотострелковая бригада) is a unit of the Russian Ground Forces formed in 2016. It is part of the 2nd Guards Combined Arms Army. The brigade's headquarters are located in Roshchinsky, Samara Oblast.

== History ==
The brigade was formed on 30 November 2016 as part of the 2nd Guards Combined Arms Army of the Central Military District. The unit replaced the 23rd Separate Guards Motor Rifle Brigade, which was reformed into the 752nd Guards Motor Rifle Regiment and became part of the 3rd Motor Rifle Division.

A notable feature of the brigade is the equipping of some combat units with UAZ Patriot vehicles to increase mobility. The formation was equipped exclusively with wheeled vehicles such as the BTR-82A, R-149MA1, Ural-4320, and others. The unit's armament includes D-30A howitzers, ZU-23 anti-aircraft guns, and BM-21 Grad multiple rocket launchers.

On 22 February 2019, the brigade commander Viktor Elovenko, along with two other soldiers of the brigade, was killed in an ambush in the Deir ez-Zor region during the Russian intervention in Syria.

=== Russian invasion of Ukraine ===
During the Russian invasion of Ukraine, from April 2022, the 30th Separate Motor Rifle Brigade conducted offensive operations in the Sievierodonetsk area. In May 2023, the brigade conducted offensive actions in the area of Makiivka in northern Luhansk Oblast. On 7 July 2023, the brigade fought defensive battles on the Karmazinivka–Krasnorichenske line (13–17 km southwest of Svatove). In January 2024, the brigade was operating in the Novobakhmutivka area in Donetsk Oblast, north of Avdiivka. On 7 February 2024, soldiers of the 30th Guards Motor Rifle Brigade, together with the 114th Separate Motor Rifle Brigade, reached Zaliznychnyi Lane during the battle of Avdiivka.

Following the battle of Avdiivka, the 30th Separate Motor Rifle Brigade was commended by the Supreme Commander-in-Chief of the Armed Forces in a congratulatory telegram to Colonel General Andrey Mordvichev on 17 February 2024.

In April 2024, the brigade took advantage of a botched rotation of Ukrainian forces and broke through to the town of Ocheretyne, overwhelming the Ukrainian 115th Mechanized Brigade, which was supposed to replace the exhausted 47th Mechanized Brigade.

On 31 July 2024, the brigade was awarded the "Guards" status.
