= Roshchinsky (inhabited locality) =

Roshchinsky (Russian: Рощинский; masculine), Roshchinskaya (Рощинская; feminine), or Roshchinskoye (Рощинское; neuter) is the name of several inhabited localities in Russia.

Urban localities

- Roshchinsky, Samara Oblast, an urban-type settlement in Volzhsky District of Samara Oblast

Rural localities

- Roshchinsky, Republic of Bashkortostan, a selo in Roshchinsky Selsoviet of Sterlitamaksky District of the Republic of Bashkortostan
- Roshchinsky, Krasnoyarsk Krai, a settlement in Roshchinsky Selsoviet of Kuraginsky District of Krasnoyarsk Krai
- Roshchinsky, Lipetsk Oblast, a settlement in Shishkinsky Selsoviet of Chaplyginsky District of Lipetsk Oblast
- Roshchinsky, Novosibirsk Oblast, a settlement in Iskitimsky District of Novosibirsk Oblast
- Roshchinsky, Omsk Oblast, a settlement in Yuryevsky Rural Okrug of Kormilovsky District of Omsk Oblast
- Roshchinsky, Stavropol Krai, a khutor in Georgiyevsky Selsoviet of Kochubeyevsky District of Stavropol Krai
