= 2nd Guards Combined Arms Army =

2nd Guards Combined Arms Red Banner Army
- 2-я гвардейская общевойсковая Kраснознаменная армия
- Great emblem of the 2nd Guards Combined Arms Army
- Active: 2001–present
- Country: Russia
- Branch: Russian Ground Forces
- Type: Combined Arms
- Part of: Volga–Ural Military District (2001–2010); Central Military District (2010–present)
- Garrison/HQ: Samara
- Engagements: Russo-Ukrainian War: Northern front of the 2022 Russian invasion of Ukraine
- Decorations: Order of the Red Banner; Guards

Commanders
- Current commander: Ramil Ibatullin

The 2nd Guards Combined Arms Red Banner Army (Russian: 2-я гвардейская общевойсковая Краснознаменная армия) (abbr. 2 OA, military unit 22223 (Russian: 2 ОА, в/ч 22223) is an operational formation of the Ground Forces of the Russian Federation within the Central Military District. The permanent location of the army command and control is 165 Frunze Street, Samara.

The army administration was recreated on September 1, 2001. The unit inherited the historical record, honorary names, military glory, and awards of the 2nd Guards Tank Army of the Red Army.

== History ==
The 2nd Guards Combined Arms Army is historically the successor to the 2nd Guards Tank Red Banner Army of the Soviet Armed Forces. By the right to eternal storage and preservation, it was awarded the Battle Banner of the association, which had gone through a glorious military path.

The 2nd Tank Army was formed in January–February 1943 on the basis of the 3rd Reserve Army of the Bryansk Front. Initially, it included the 11th and 16th tank corps, the 60th, 112th, and 194th rifle divisions, the 115th rifle, 28th ski, 11th Guards tank brigades, other formations, and military units.

During the Second World War, the unit participated in the Battle of Bryansk, the counteroffensive near Kursk, the liberation of Right Bank Ukraine, and the final operations of the war.

In the post-war years, the army was part of the Group of Soviet Forces in Germany (later the Western Group of Forces). Its formations and military units (16th Guards and 25th Tank Divisions, 21st Motorized Rifle Division, 94th Guards Motorized Rifle Division, etc.) were stationed on the territory of the German Democratic Republic in 39 garrisons, with the headquarters located in the city of Furstenberg.

On February 22, 1968, by decree of the Presidium of the Supreme Soviet of the USSR, the 2nd Guards Tank Army was awarded the Order of the Red Banner.

In 1993, the army was withdrawn from the territory of East Germany and became part of the Volga Military District. In accordance with the directive of the General Staff of the Ground Forces of November 11, 1993, the control of the 2nd Guards Tank Red Banner Army was transferred to a new staff and received the name of the control of the Guards Combined Arms Red Banner Army.

In accordance with the order of the Minister of Defense of the Russian Federation dated August 3, 1997 No. 040 and the directive of the Commander-in-Chief of the Russian Ground Forces dated December 25, 1997 No. 453/1/0820, the army administration was disbanded, and its formations and military units were transferred to the Volga Military District.

Formed in pursuance of the directive of the Chief of the General Staff of the Russian Armed Forces dated April 17, 2001, No. 314/2/0300 “On the transformation of the Volga and Ural military districts into the Volga-Ural military district and the formation of the 2nd combined arms army” and the directive of the commander of the Volga Military District dated April 27, 2001, No. 15/1/0230. According to these directives, by September 1, 2001, the administration of the Volga Military District was reorganized into the administration of the 2nd Combined Arms Army. The army headquarters was located at the headquarters of the disbanded Volga Military District in Samara.

On September 4, 2001, based on the directive of the Chief of the General Staff of the Armed Forces of the Russian Federation, the battle banner of the 2nd Guards Tank Red Banner Army with guards and order ribbons, a certificate of honor, and an extract from the historical certificate were received at the Central Armed Forces Museum. In accordance with Decree of the President of Russia of November 19, 2002 No. 1337, the Battle Banner and the Order of the 2nd Guards Tank Red Banner Army, disbanded in 1998, were transferred to the 2nd Combined Arms Army. Henceforth, the army will be called the 2nd Guards Combined Arms Red Banner Army. This confirmed the right of succession to the 2nd Guards Tank Red Banner Army, disbanded in 1998.

In 2006, the Army conducted a large Command-Staff exercise, "Southern Shield - 2006", that included a call-up of some 4–5,000 reservists. The exercise proved successful and confirmed the Army's readiness status, including that of two component divisions, which conducted a tactical exercise within the scope of the "Southern Shield – 2006". The tactical exercise was again conducted in 2007 by the 27th Motor Rifle Division. This division and several other Army sub-units are today entirely staffed by service personnel serving under professional contracts.

As of February 2008, the Army's commander was General-Major Oleg Leont'evich Makarevich (former Chief of Staff, 22nd Army, Moscow Military District).

In 2009, the 27th Division at Totskoye was converted into the 21st Guards Motor Rifle Brigade.

One of the army's units is the 15th Separate Guards Berlin Motor Rifle Brigade, in Roshchinsky, Samara Oblast, equipped with BTR (Military Unit Number 90600).

Formations and military units of the 2nd Guards Combined Arms Army are deployed on the territory of three constituent entities of the Russian Federation: the Republic of Udmurtia, Orenburg, and Samara regions. The area of the territory where formations and military units of the association are deployed is 524.4 thousand km^{2}.

At the end of 2015, army units took part in more than 100 exercises, conducted about 360 live firing exercises as part of units, over 3.5 thousand fire training classes, and about 2 thousand classes in driving combat vehicles. The army's missile brigade has been re-equipped with the Iskander-M complex.

On 24 February 2022, the 2nd Guards Combined Arms Army invaded Ukraine through the Sumy Oblast as part of a Russian offensive on Ukraine's capital city, Kyiv.

== Structure ==
In 2024, the army included the following units:

- 15th Separate Guards Motor Rifle Brigade (Roshchinsky) (Military Unit Number 90600)
- 27th Guards Motor Rifle Division (Totskoye) (MUN 35100)
- 30th Separate Guards Motor Rifle Brigade (Roshchinsky) (MUN 45863)
- 92nd Rocket Brigade (Totskoye) (MUN 30785)
- 385th Guards Artillery Brigade (Totskoye) (MUN 32755)
- 950th Rocket Artillery Regiment (Totskoye)
- 297th Anti-Aircraft Rocket Brigade (Leonidovka) (MUN 02030)
- 91st Headquarters Brigade (Samara) (MUN 59292)
- 105th Logistic Support Brigade (Roshchinsky and Kryazh)
- 2nd NBC Protection Regiment (Chapayevsk) (MUN 18664)
- 39th Engineer Sapper Regiment (Kizner) (MUN 53701)
- 53rd Electronic Warfare Battalion (Samara)
- 71st communications center (Kalinovka village)
- 2934th satellite communication station (Roshinsky village)
- 323rd mail and telephone communication center (Samara)
- 1388th Command Intelligence Center (Samara) (MUN 23280)

== Commanders ==
- September 2001 – February 2005: Major/Lieutenant General Aleksei Ivanovich Verbitsky
- February 2005 – January 2006: Lieutenant General Aleksandr Igorevich Studenikin
- January 2006 – 2008: Major/Lieutenant General Sergei Ivanovich Skokov
- January 2008 – 2009: Major General Oleg Leontevich Makarevich
- 2009 – June 2010: Major General Hasan Bekovich Kaloev
- June 2010 – January 2014: Major General Aleksandr Aleksandrovich Zhuravlyov
- January 2014 – September 2016: Major/Lieutenant General Igor Anatolyevich Seritsky
- September 2016 – December 2017: Major General Gennady Valeryevich Zhidko
- December 2017 – December 2018: Major General Rustam Usmanovich Muradov
- December 2018 – February 2022: Major/Lieutenant General Andrey Vladimirovich Kolotovkin
- February 2022 – 2024: Major General Vyacheslav Nikolaevich Gurov
- 2024 – present: Ramil Rakhmatulloevich Ibatullin
