= Central Military District =

Military district of Russian Federation

- Центральный военный округ
- Emblem of the Central Military District
- Founded: 21 October 2010
- Country: Russian Federation
- Branch: Russian Ground Forces
- Type: Military district
- Part of: Ministry of Defence
- Headquarters: Lenin Avenue 71, Yekaterinburg
- Engagements: Russo-Ukrainian War; Invasion of Ukraine
- Decorations: Order of the Red Banner
- Website: Official website

Commanders
- Commander: Colonel General Andrey Ivanayev
- Chief of Staff, First Deputy Commander: Lieutenant General Dmitry Glushenkov

Insignia
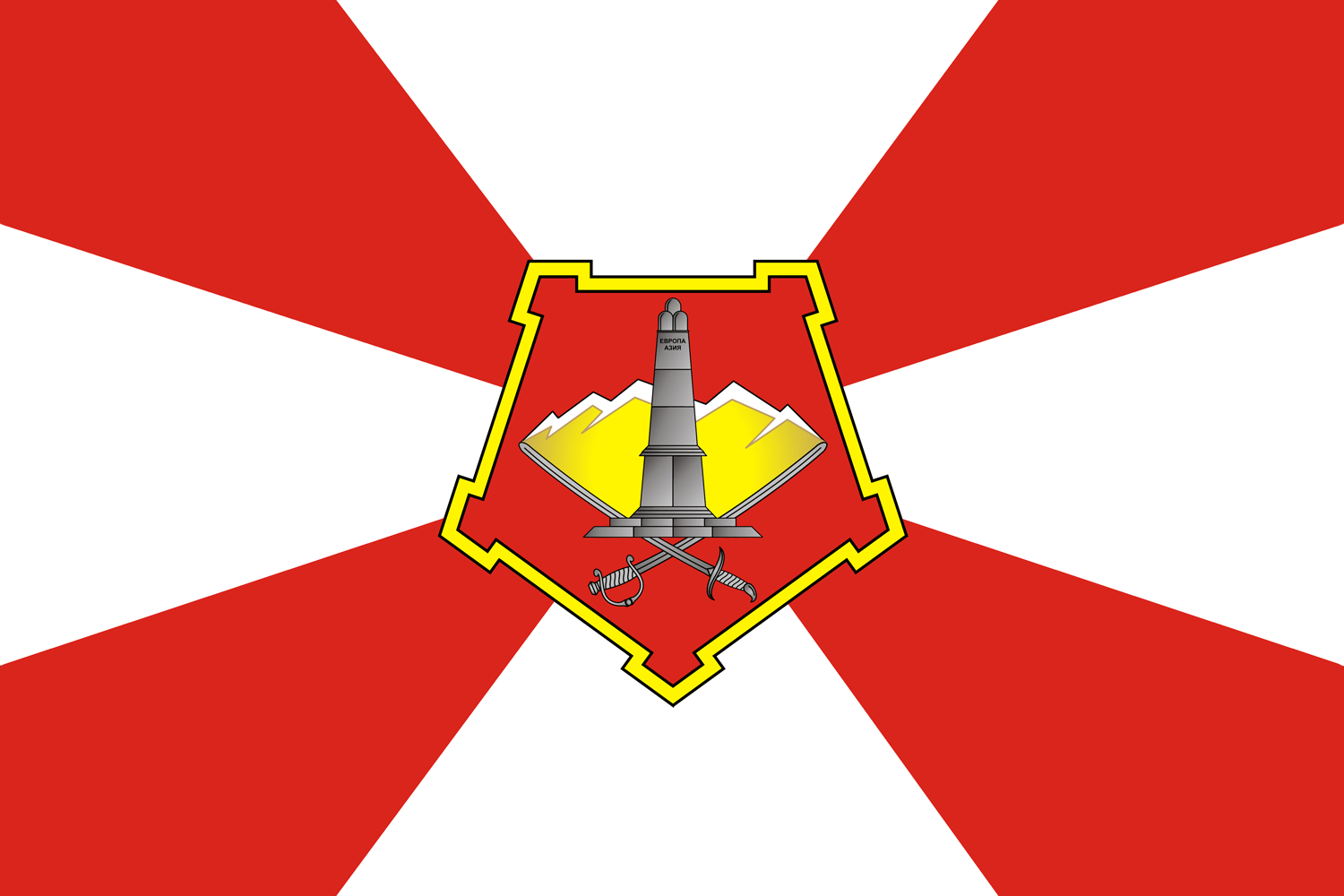
- Flag

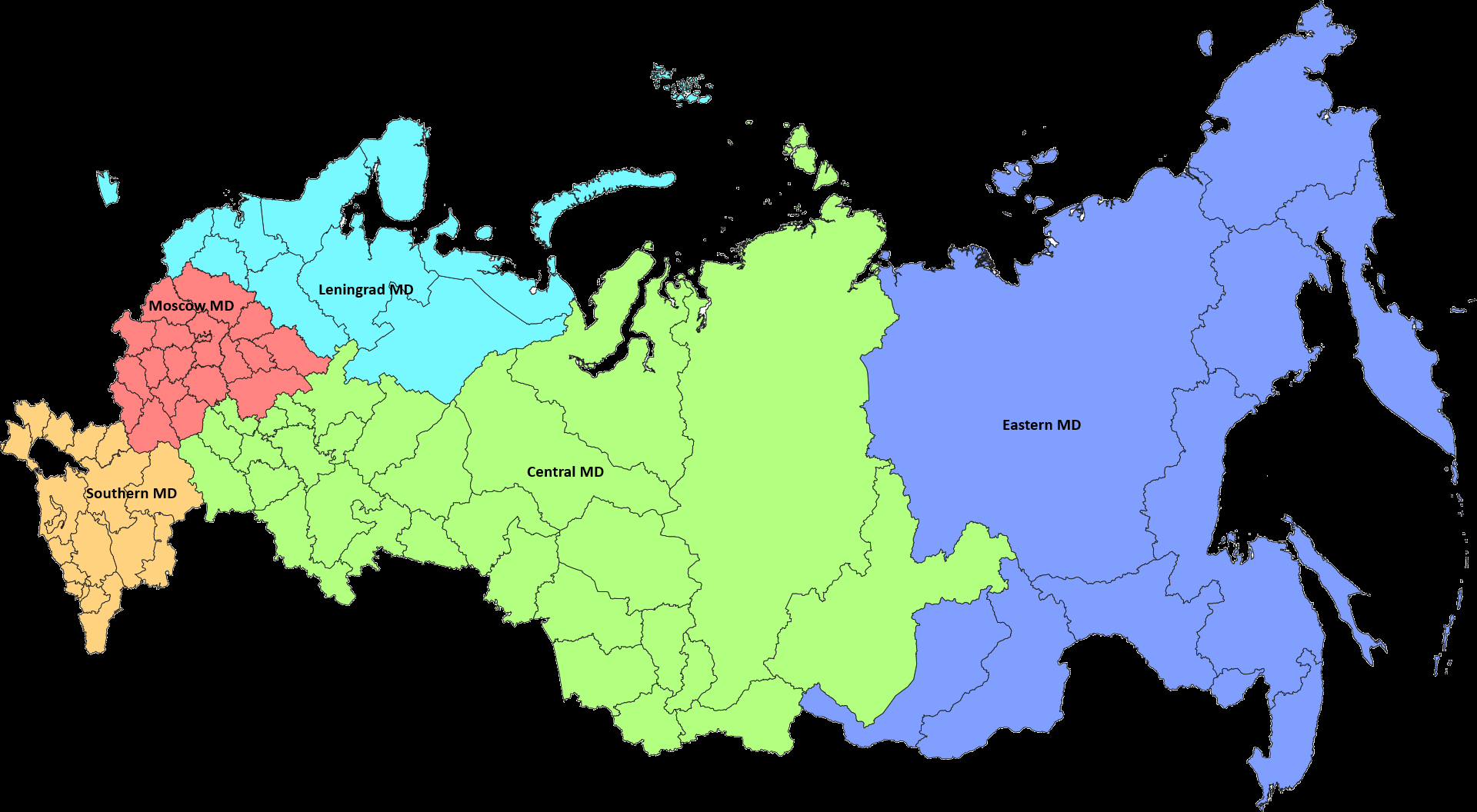
Military districts of Russia. The Central Military District is shown in green.

The Order of the Red Banner Central Military District (Russian: Центральный военный округ, romanized: Tsentral'nyy voyennyy okrug) is a military district of Russia.

It is one of the five military districts of the Russian Armed Forces, with its jurisdiction primarily within the central Volga, Ural and Siberia regions of the country and Russian bases in Central Asian post-Soviet states. The Central Military District was created as part of the 2008 military reforms, and founded by Presidential Decree No.1144 signed on September 20, 2010, as an amalgamation of the Volga–Urals Military District and a majority of the Siberian Military District. The district began operation on October 21, 2010, under the command of Lieutenant-General Vladimir Chirkin.

The Central Military District is the largest military district in Russia by geographic size at 7,060,000 square kilometers (2,730,000 sq mi) (40% of Russian territory) and population at 54.9 million people (39%). The district contains 29 of the 85 federal subjects of Russia: Altai Krai, Altai Republic, Bashkortostan, Chelyabinsk Oblast, Chuvashia, Irkutsk Oblast, Kemerovo Oblast, Khakassia, Khanty-Mansi Autonomous Okrug, Kirov Oblast, Krasnoyarsk Krai, Kurgan Oblast, Mari El, Mordovia, Yamalo-Nenets Autonomous Okrug, Novosibirsk Oblast, Omsk Oblast, Orenburg Oblast, Penza Oblast, Perm Krai, Samara Oblast, Saratov Oblast, Sverdlovsk Oblast, Tatarstan, Tomsk Oblast, Tuva, Tyumen Oblast, Udmurtia, Ulyanovsk Oblast.

The Central Military District is headquartered in Yekaterinburg, and its current district commander is Colonel-General Andrey Ivanayev, who has held the position since 5 August 2026.

== History ==
It was reported that a new mountain motorised rifle brigade, the 55th, would be formed in Kyzyl, Tyva Republic, in 2015. The brigade was formed in November 2015.

In June 2015, Leslie H. Gelb wrote that the role of the Central Military District is to "orchestrate Russian engagement in local conflicts within Central Asia, to manage Russia’s bases in Tajikistan and Kyrgyzstan, and to supply reinforcements from its two armies either to the east or the west in the event of war" and that their purpose is to "forestall instability that might spill over into Russia and to remind everyone that Russia’s Armed Forces are mightier than China’s".

In February 2019, there were Russian-language reports that the Central Military District (as well as the Western Military District) were to be divided, to leave a military district organisation more like the pre-2010 situation.

After the signing of the 2020 Nagorno-Karabakh ceasefire agreement on 9 November 2020, the Russian Defense Ministry announced that Russian peacekeepers would be deployed to Nagorno-Karabakh the following day for monitoring the cease-fire and the cessation of military actions in the Nagorno-Karabakh conflict zone. The contingent will consist of 1,960 servicemen, 90 armored vehicles, 380 units of vehicles and special equipment mainly formed of units of the 15th Separate Motor Rifle Brigade of the Central Military District.

== Component units ==
The following list is mostly sourced from milkavkaz, 2017.

=== Ground forces ===
- 2nd Guards Combined Arms Army (Samara)
  - 27th Guards Motor Rifle Division
  - 15th Separate Guards Motor Rifle Brigade
  - 385th Guards Artillery Brigade
- 41st Guards Combined Arms Army (Novosibirsk)
  - 35th Separate Guards Motor Rifle Brigade
  - 74th Separate Guards Motor Rifle Brigade
  - 55th Mountain Motor Rifle Brigade
- 25th Combined Arms Army (Yekaterinburg)
  - 67th Motorized Rifle Division
    - 31st Motorized Rifle Regiment (Bashkortostan)
    - 36th Motorized Rifle Regiment
    - 37th Motorized Rifle Regiment
    - 19th Tank Regiment
  - 164th Separate Motorized Rifle Brigade (Aleysk)
  - 11th Separate Tank Brigade
  - 73rd Artillery Brigade
  - 75th Artillery Brigade
- 3rd Army Corps (Mulino)
  - 6th Motor Rifle Division
    - 54th Motor Rifle Regiment
    - 57th Motor Rifle Regiment
    - 10th Tank Regiment
    - 27th Artillery Regiment
    - 52nd Anti-Aircraft Missile Brigade
  - 72nd Separate Motor Rifle Brigade
  - 17th Heavy Duty Brigade
- 90th Guards Tank Division (Chebarkul)
- 201st Military Base (Dushanbe, Tajikistan)
- 232nd Rocket Artillery Brigade (Chebarkul) (see ru:232-я реактивная артиллерийская бригада)
- 28th Anti-Aircraft Missile Brigade (Chebarkul)
- 59th Command Brigade (Verkhnyaya Pyshma)
- 179th Signal Brigade (Yekaterinburg)
- 12th Separate Guards Engineer Brigade (Ufa)
- 15th Separate Motor Rifle Peacekeeping Brigade (Roshchinsky, Samara Oblast)
- 1st Mobile NBC Protection Brigade (Shikhany)
- 29th Separate NBC Protection Brigade (Yekaterinburg)
- 5th Separate Railway Brigade (Abakan)
- 43rd Separate Railway Brigade (Yekaterinburg)
- 48th Separate Railway Brigade (Omsk)
- 105th Separate Logistics Support Brigade (Kryazh)
- 106th Separate Logistics Support Brigade (Yurga)
- 24th Separate Repair and Recovery Regiment (Karabash)
- 473rd District Training Center (Yelansky, Sverdlovsk Oblast)

== GABTU ==
- 1311 Central Base for Storage and Repair of Weapons and Military Equipment (TsBHiRT) (Military Unit Number 42716, Verkhnyaya Pyshma), former Volga-Urals Military District; - 415 tanks are relatively combat-ready (of which 289 are being preserved under dry air)
- 3018 Central Tank Reserve Base (military unit 75485, 624852, Kamyshlov, Sverdlovsk Oblast)

=== Main Directorate of General Staff ===
- 3rd Guards Special Purpose Brigade (Tolyatti)
- 24th Special Purpose Brigade (Novosibirsk)
- 39th Separate Special Purpose Radio-Technical Brigade (Orenburg)

=== Airborne troops ===
- 104th Guards Air Assault Division (Ulyanovsk)
- 242nd Training Centre

=== Aerospace Forces ===
- 14th Air and Air Defence Forces Army (Yekaterinburg)
  - 337th Separate Helicopter Regiment

=== Unmanned Systems Forces ===
- 7th Separate Unmanned Systems Reconnaissance Strike Regiment

=== Joint-service ceremonial units ===
- Military Band of the Central Military District (Yekaterinburg)
- Honour Guard of the Central Military District
- Song and Dance Ensemble of the Central Military District

== Leadership ==
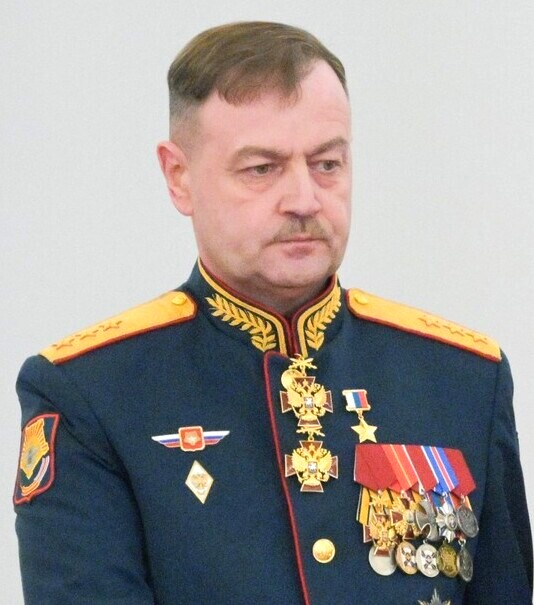
Colonel general Andrey Ivanayev, current commander of the district.

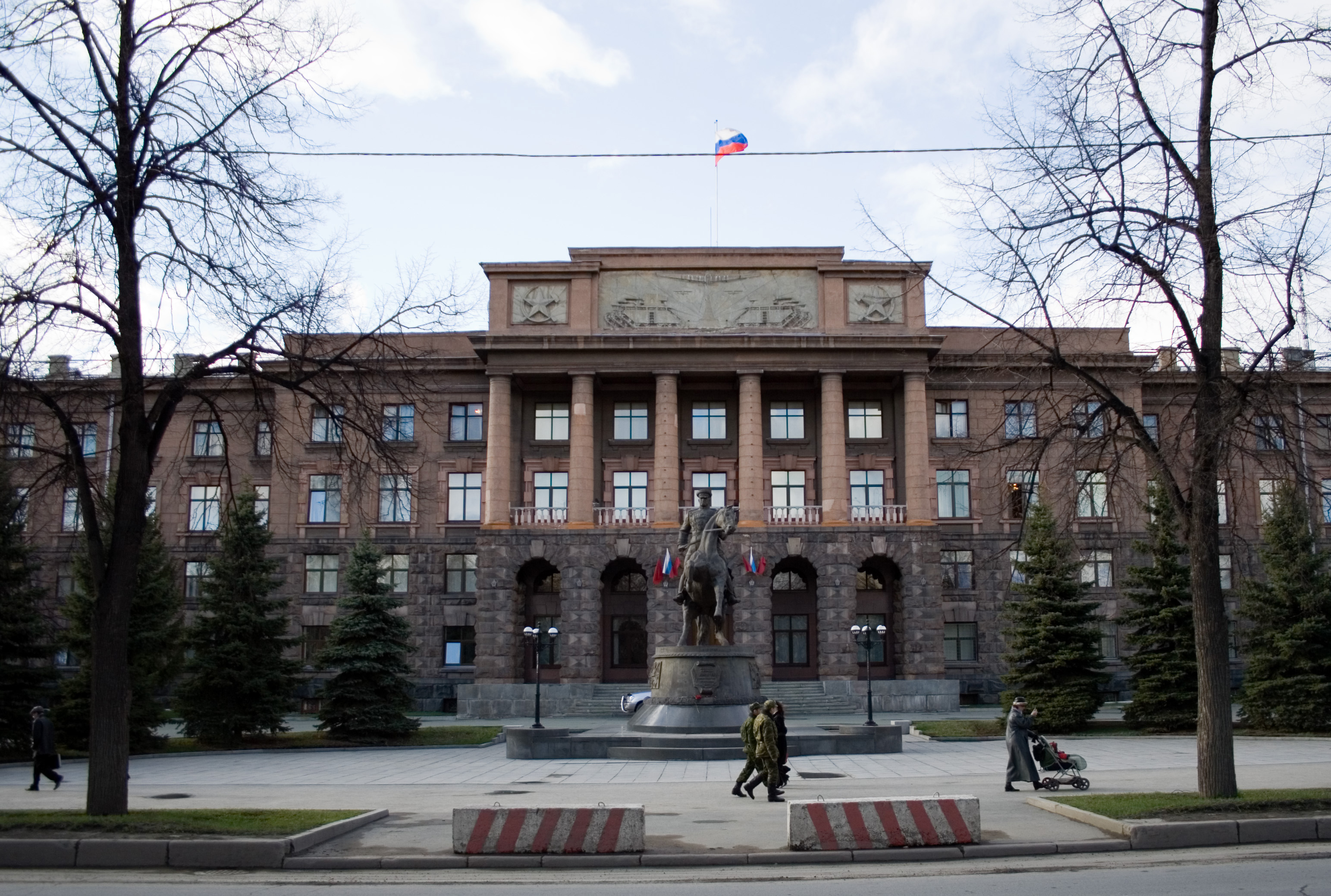
The Central Military District headquarters building in Yekaterinburg

=== Commanders ===
- Lieutenant-General Vladimir Chirkin (9 July – 13 December 2010 (acting), 13 December 2010 – 26 April 2012)
- Colonel-General Valery Gerasimov (26 April – 9 November 2012)
- Major-General Aleksandr Dvornikov (9 November – 24 December 2012 (interim)).
- Colonel-General Nikolay Bogdanovsky (24 December 2012 – 12 June 2014)
- Colonel-General Vladimir Zarudnitsky (12 June 2014 – 22 November 2017)
- Lieutenant-General Aleksandr Lapin (22 November 2017 – 29 October 2022) (later Colonel General)
- Major-General Aleksandr Linkov (29 October 2022 – 17 February 2023 (acting))
- Colonel-General Andrey Mordvichev (17 February 2023 – 15 May 2025)
- Colonel-General Valery Solodchuk (15 May 2025 – 5 August 2026)
- Colonel-General Andrey Ivanayev (5 August 2026 – present)

=== Chiefs of Staff - First Deputy Commanders ===
- Lieutenant General Mikhail Teplinsky (February 2019 – June 2022) (Colonel General since 8 December 2021)
- Colonel General Denis Lyamin (October 2023 – August 2026)

=== Deputy commanders ===
- Deputy commander
  - Lieutenant General Khasan Kaloyev (?? – August 2018)
  - Lieutenant General Yevgeny Poplavsky (November 2018 – March 2023)
  - Lieutenant General Dmitry Glushenkov (March 2023 – present)
- Deputy commander for Military-Political Work and Head of the Department for Military-Political Work
  - Major General Rustam Minnekayev (December 2020 – present)

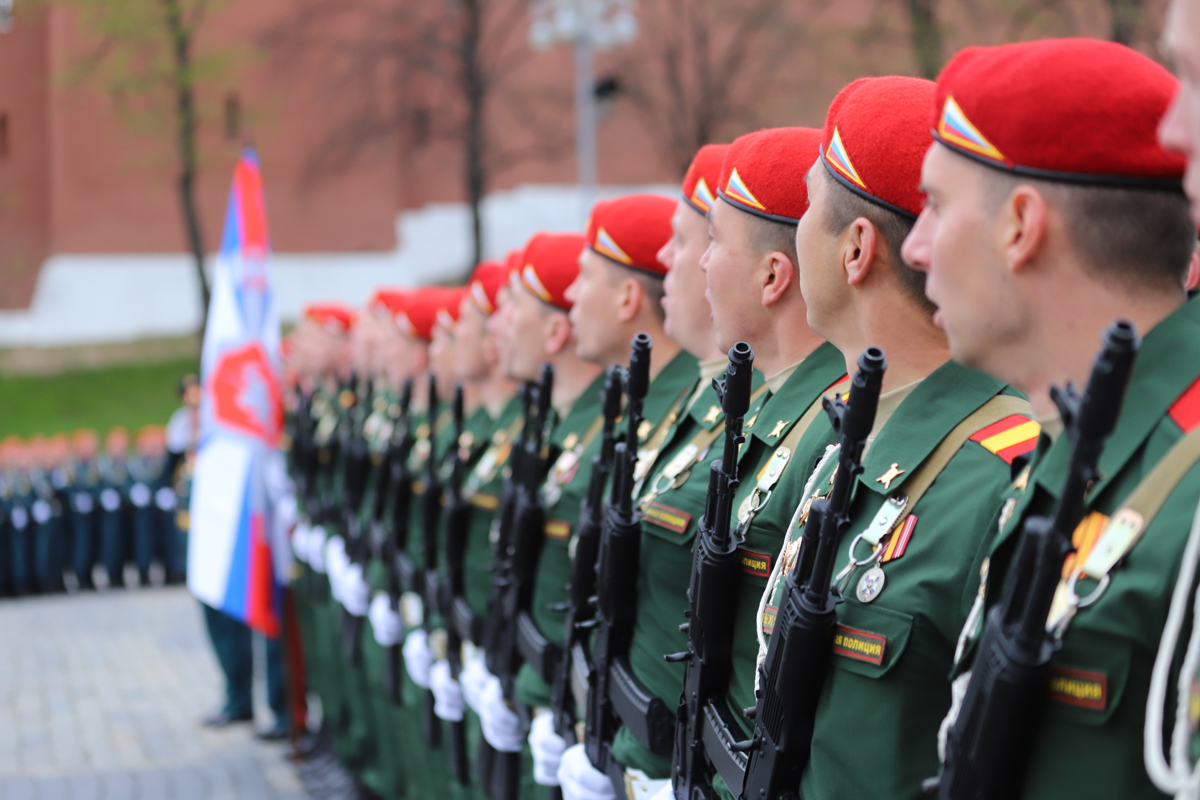
Members of the Military Police of the Central Military District on Red Square.

== See also ==
- List of military airbases in Russia
