= 100th Separate Guards Reconnaissance Brigade =

100th Guards Reconnaissance Brigade
- 100-я отдельная гвардейская бригада разведки
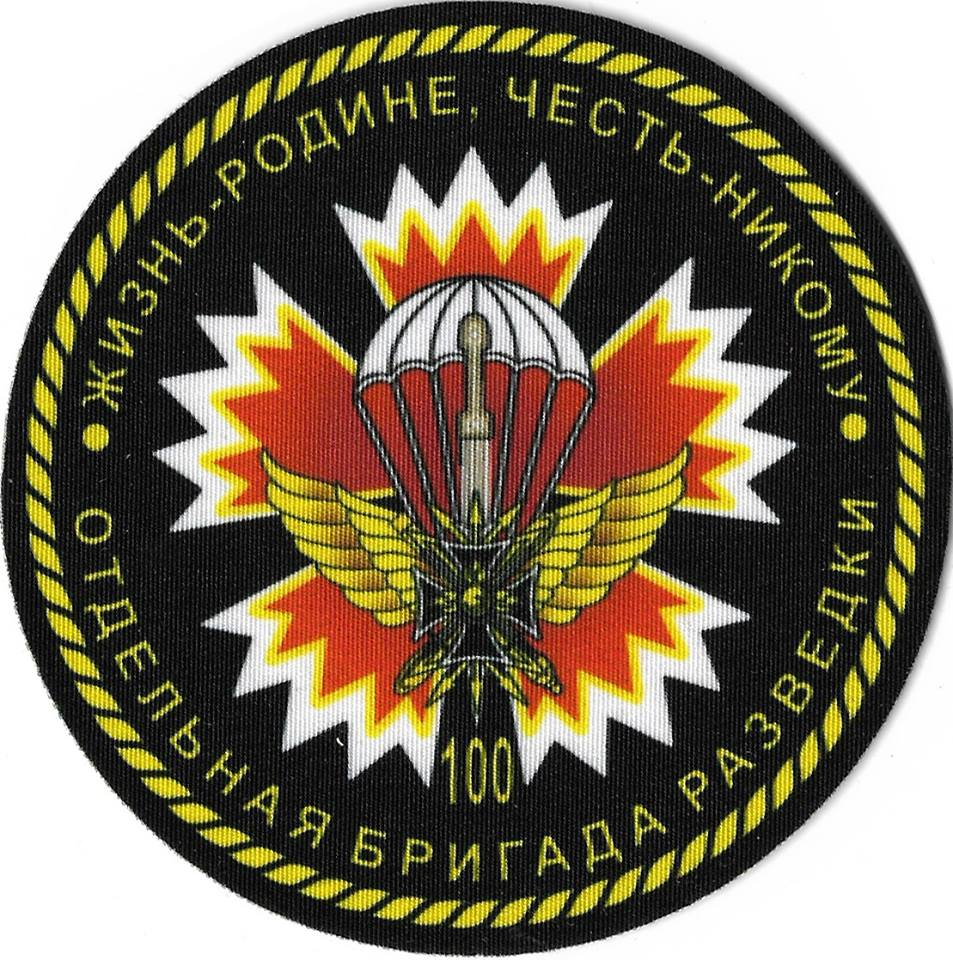
- Active: 2009–present
- Country: Russia
- Branch: Russian Ground Forces
- Type: Reconnaissance
- Size: Brigade
- Part of: 58th Combined Arms Army
- Garrison/HQ: Mozdok
- Nickname: Сотка (One hundred)
- Engagements: Russo-Ukrainian War: 2023 Ukrainian counteroffensive
- Decorations: Guards

The 100th Guards Reconnaissance Brigade (100-я отдельная гвардейская бригада разведки) is a military formation of the Russian Federation. It is part of the 58th Combined Arms Army of the Southern Military District and is garrisoned in Mozdok, Republic of North Ossetia-Alania. Its military unit number is 23511.

== History ==
The unit was formed in 2009 as an experimental reconnaissance unit out of experienced personnel from the Russian Airborne Forces (VDV) and Spetsnaz GRU. It is speculated that the organisation was inspired by US armored cavalry type units. In late 2012 the then new Minister of Defense Sergei Shoigu proposed for the unit to be disbanded for not fitting with the Russian doctrine. Representatives of the Southern Military District referred to the creation of the unit as being an "overseas curiosity".

On 18 December 2023 the brigade was awarded the Guards title with a decree from Russian president Vladimir Putin "for massive heroism and bravery, fortitude and courage, demonstrated by the personnel of the brigade in combat actions in defense of the Fatherland and state interests in the conditions of armed conflicts."

== Structure ==
The current commander of the brigade is Colonel Sergei Popov. The deputy commander is Colonel Alexander Shabunin.

List of subordinate units of the brigade:

- Air assault battalion
- Reconnaissance battalion
- Electronic warfare battalion
- Artillery battalion
- Anti-aircraft battery
- Engineering company
- UAV unit
- Special Forces unit
- Logistics unit
