= 57th Separate Guards Motor Rifle Brigade =

Russian Ground Forces formation

57th Separate Guards Kransograd Red Banner Order of Suvorov Motor Rifle Brigade
- 57-я отдельная гвардейская мотострелковая Красноградская Краснознамённая, ордена Суворова бригада
- Sleeve patch of the brigade
- Active: 2009–present
- Country: Russia
- Branch: Russian Ground Forces
- Type: Mechanized infantry
- Size: Brigade
- Part of: 5th Guards Combined Arms Army
- Garrison/HQ: Bikin
- Engagements: Russian invasion of Ukraine; 2023 Ukrainian counteroffensive; Battle of Vuhledar; Velyka Novosilka offensive
- Decorations: Guards; Order of the Red Banner; Order of Suvorov
- Battle honours: Krasnograd

The 57th Separate Guards Kransograd Red Banner Order of Suvorov Motor Rifle Brigade (Russian: 57-я отдельная гвардейская мотострелковая Красноградская Краснознамённая, ордена Суворова бригада; MUN 46102) is a unit of the Russian Ground Forces. It traces its history back to the Soviet 81st Guards Rifle Division. It is part of the 5th Combined Arms Army. It is the only unit of the 5th Army located outside Primorsky Krai, in Bikin.

== History ==
=== Soviet Union ===
The unit's predecessor is the 422nd Rifle Division (2nd formation), formed by order of the Stavka of the Supreme High Command on 4 March 1942 in Bikin in the Russian Far East. The division first saw combat in the Battle of Stalingrad and was redesignated as the 81st Guards Rifle Division on 1 March 1943 in recognition of its performance.

The division participated in the Battle of Kursk and the crossing of the Dnieper. On 19 September 1943, the division received the honorary title "Krasnograd" for the liberation of the city of Krasnograd in Kharkov Oblast. Its subsequent combat path went through Romania, Hungary, and Austria. On 8 January 1944, the division was awarded the Order of the Red Banner, and on 6 January 1945, it was awarded the Order of Suvorov, 2nd class.

During 1946–1948, as part of postwar reforms, the division was reorganised into the 9th Guards Rifle Brigade, but this change was reversed in 1953. In 1957, the unit was reorganised into the 81st Guards Motor Rifle Division.

=== Russian Federation ===
In 2009, the unit was reformed into the 57th Guards Motor Rifle Brigade.

During the Russian invasion of Ukraine, the brigade was deployed in southern Donetsk Oblast. During the 2023 Ukrainian counteroffensive, the unit was engaged in fighting near the villages of Andriivka and Kurdiumivka south of Bakhmut. Since April 2024, the brigade has been operating in the Vuhledar region along with the 36th Motor Rifle Brigade before launching a renewed offensive on the city in September. After the fall of the city, the unit took part in the Velyka Novosilka offensive.
