= 21st Separate Guards Motor Rifle Brigade =

21st Guards Red Banner Omsk-Novobug Order of Bogdan Khmelnitsky Motorized Rifle Brigade
- Russian: 21-я отдельная гвардейская Краснознаменная Омско-Новобугская ордена Богдана Хмельницкого мотострелковая бригада
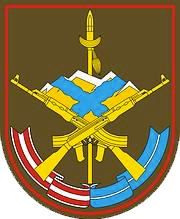
- 21st Guards Motor Rifle Brigade shoulder sleeve insignia
- Active: 2009–2024
- Country: Russia
- Branch: Russian Ground Forces
- Type: Motorized Infantry
- Size: Brigade
- Part of: 2nd Guards Combined Arms Army, Central Military District
- Garrison/HQ: Totskoye, Orenburg Oblast; MUN 12128
- Engagements: War in Donbas • Battle of Ilovaisk; Russian invasion of Ukraine

Commanders
- Current commander: Colonel Dmitri Zavyalov (as of 2019)

The 21st Guards Red Banner Omsk-Novobug Order of Bogdan Khmelnitsky Motorized Rifle Brigade, or simply the 21st Guards Motor Rifle Brigade was a formation of the Russian Ground Forces based in Orenburg Oblast. It was formed on 1 June 2009 from the 27th Guards Motor Rifle Division as a result of the 2008 Russian military reform.

In 2014, the brigade was involved in the Russian military intervention in Ukraine. In the spring of 2024, the 27th Guards Motorized Rifle Division was revived and 21st Brigade disbanded.

== History ==
In August 2014, the brigade's units fought in the Battle of Ilovaisk. On 29 August, during a Ukrainian breakthrough attempt from Ilovaisk, a "northern" column of Ukrainian forces took the fight with 21st brigade's troops on a road between Voznesenka and Horbatenko villages. A Ukrainian T-64 tank and several BMP-2s of 51st Mechanized Brigade were able to destroy two T-72BA tanks and a BMP-2 of the 21st Motor Rifle Brigade. Another 21st brigade's T-72BA tank was destroyed near Kumachove village, presumably by a Tochka-U missile strike of the 19th Missile Brigade.

A Ukrainian Headquarters briefing held on 11 March 2015 noted the 21st Motor Rifle Brigade units are operating near Yenakiieve, Ukraine.

Bodies of soldiers, reportedly from the division, which were killed in the 2022 Russian invasion of Ukraine near Rusaniv were among six that were to be swapped for two captured Ukrainian soldiers in an exchange in March 2022.

=== 2024 ===
Becoming 27th Motor Rifle Division as of April 2024, consisting of:

- 433rd Motor Rifle Regiment,
- 506th Motor Rifle Regiment,
- 589th Motor Rifle Regiment,
- 268th self-propelled artillery regiment,
- 1107th separate anti-tank artillery division,
- 838th separate anti-aircraft missile division,
- 907th separate reconnaissance battalion,
- 1614th separate engineer battalion,
- 834th separate communications battalion,
- 140th separate logistics battalion,
- 341st separate medical battalion

== Commanders ==
- Colonel Andrey Sergeevich TRIFONOV
