= List of guards units of Ukraine =

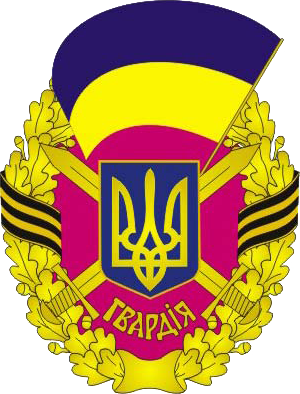
Insignia of Ukrainian Guards units

The Armed Forces of Ukraine had a large number of Guards units. On 22 August 2016, with the removal of Soviet distinctions from the Armed Forces of Ukraine, the Guards titles were removed from the names of the units. The page lists all former Ukrainian guards units.

== Army ==
- 6th Guards Army Order of the Red Banner Corps
  - 93rd Guards Mechanized Kharkiv twice Orders of the Red Banner, Suvorov and Kutuzov Brigade
  - 17th Guards Armored Kryvyi Rih Orders of the Red Banner and Suvorov Brigade
  - 28th Guards Mechanized Brigade
  - 534th Guards Combat Engineer Battalion
  - 150th Guards Signal Battalion
  - 121st Guards Signal Fokshano-Mukdensk Orders of the Alexander Nevsky and Red Star Regiment
  - 806th Guards Signal Uman Orders of the Red Banner and Bogdan Khmelnitsky Regiment
- 8th Army Corps
  - 72nd Guards Mechanized Chervonohrad-Kyiv Order of Red Banner Brigade
  - 30th Guards Mechanized Novohrad-Volynskyi Rivne Orders of the Red Banner and Suvorov Brigade
    - 54th Guards Reconnaissance Prutsko-Pomeransk Orders of Kutuzov, Bogdan Khmelnitsky, Alexander Nevsky Battalion
  - 1st Guards Armored Novohrad Orders of the Red Banner, Kutuzov, Bogdan Khmelnitsky, Alexander Nevsky and Red Star Brigade
- 13th Army Corps
  - 51st Guards Mechanized Perekops'ko-Kharkivska Praz'ko-Volynska Order of Lenin, twice Order of Red Banner, Orders of Suvorov and Kutuzov Brigade
  - 128th Guards Mechanized Turkestans'ko-Zakarpats'ka twice Order of Red Banner Brigade
    - 15th Guards Mountain Infantry Sevastopol Order of Bogdan Khmelnitsky Battalion
  - 11th Guards Artillery Kyiv Red Banner Bogdan Khmelnitsky orders brigade
  - 15th Guards Artillery Kyiv Orders of Lenin, Red Banner, Bogdan Khmelnitsky and Alexander Nevsky Regiment
  - 300th Guards Mechanized Budapest Regiment
  - 21st Guards Mechanized Rechytskii Orders of the Red Banner, Suvorov and Bogdan Khmelnitsky Battalion
- 169th Training Guards Zvenyhorodsk Orders of the Red Banner and Suvorov Center
- 354th Training Guards Mechanized Kyshuniv Order of Suvorov Regiment
- 300th Training Guards Armored Sandomir Order of Alexander Nevsky Regiment
- 11th Guards Combat Engineer Berlin Regiment
- 554th Training Guards Signal Battalion
- 208th Guards Anti-Aircraft Order of the Red Banner Brigade
- 50th Guards Anti-Aircraft Sevastopol-Feodosiiskii Regiment
- 126th Guards Signal Battalion

Education facilities Kharkiv Guards Faculty of Military Training of National Technical University "KhPI", former Kharkiv Guards Institute of Armored Force

== Air Force ==
- 831st Guards Fighter Aviation Galych Orders of the Red Banner and Kutuzov Brigade
- 456th Guards Transport Aviation Volgograd Order of the Red Banner Brigade
- 208th Guards Anti-Aircraft Artillery Order of the Red Banner Brigade

== Navy ==
- 25th Guards Transport Naval Aviation Moscow Brigade

== MVS ==
- 10th Territorial Guards Order of the Red Star Signal Unit

== SBU ==
- Guards Aviation Base of Internal Troops

== DPSU ==
- Guards Orsha Orders of Suvorov, Kutuzov and Alexander Nevsky Training Center of Preparation of Junior Specialists for State Border Guard Service of Ukraine

== STSU ==
- 1st Joint Guards Varshavskii Order of Kutuzov Unit
- 11th Separate Guards Mobile Order of the Red Star Unit
