= 27th Guards Motor Rifle Division =

Russian Ground Forces formation

27th Guards Omsk-Novobug Red Banner Order of Bogdan Khmelnitskiy Motor Rifle Division
- 27-я гвардейская мотострелковая Омско-Новобугская Краснознамённая ордена Богдана Хмельницкого дивизия
- 27th Guards Motor Rifle Division shoulder sleeve insignia
- Active: 1945–1964, 1964–2009, 2024–present
- Country: Soviet Union (1945–1991); Russia (1991–2009, 2024–present)
- Branch: Russian Ground Forces
- Type: Motorized Infantry
- Size: Division
- Part of: Central Military District; 2nd Combined Arms Army
- Garrison/HQ: Totskoye, Orenburg Oblast; MUN 35100
- Engagements: Operation Danube; Second Chechen War; Russo-Ukrainian War; War in Donbas; Battle of Ilovaisk; Invasion of Ukraine; Pokrovsk offensive
- Decorations: Guards; Order of the Red Banner; Order of Bogdan Khmelnitsky
- Battle honours: "Omsk-Novobug"

Commanders
- Current commander: Colonel Dmitri Zavyalov (as of 2019)

The 27th Guards Omsk-Novobug Red Banner Order of Bogdan Khmelnitskiy Motor Rifle Division (Russian: 27-я гвардейская мотострелковая Омско-Новобугская Краснознамённая ордена Богдана Хмельницкого дивизия; Military Unit Number 35100) is a Guards mechanised infantry division of the Russian Ground Forces. It was a Red Army rifle division in World War II which later became a Soviet Ground Forces motor rifle division. In 2009, it was reformed into the 21st Guards Motor Rifle Brigade. In the spring of 2024, the 27th Guards Motor Rifle Division was revived.

== History ==
The division draws its history from the 75th Naval Rifle Brigade formed in the end of 1941. As part of the 3rd Shock Army, Kalinin Front in 1942 the brigade participated in the Demiansk operations – the Moscow counteroffensive. For its fighting performance it became the 3rd Guards Rifle Brigade in March 1942, having spent all its time in reserve, became the 27th Guards Rifle Division in April–May 1942. With a view to the preservation of fighting and revolutionary traditions of earlier formations, the name "Omsk" which 27th Rifle Division had during the Russian Civil War had earlier was given to the new division. It included the 76th Guards Rifle Regiment, the predecessor to today's 15th Separate Motor Rifle Brigade.

In the late summer of 1942, it was rushed south to help stop the German offensive into the northern Caucasus and Stalingrad. It took part in the destruction of the German 6th Army during the winter of 1942/43. During World War II the division was part of the 4th Tank Army, 1st Guards Army, the 24th Army, the 66th Army, the 65th Army and since February 1943 the 62nd Army. In April 1942 the 62nd Army became the Eighth Guards Army. In July 1942 the division was part of Kalinin Front's 58th Army, alongside 16th Guards Rifle Division and two other rifle divisions. The division was back with the 8th Guards Army of the 1st Belorussian Front in May 1945.

The division participated in the Battle of Stalingrad, Izyum-Barvenkovo, Donbass, Zaporozhye, Nikopol-Krivoi Rog, Bereznegova-Snigirovka, Odessa, Lublin – Brest, Poznań, Küstrin, Warsaw-Poznan and the Berlin offensive operation. For services in battle the division was awarded the honorific "Novobug" in March 1944, then awarded the Order of the Red Banner and Order of Bogdan Khmelnitsky 2nd degrees. Over 10 thousand of its soldiers were awarded awards and medals, and 7 were awarded the Hero of the Soviet Union. Its commanders included Colonel Konstantin Vindushev (1942), and Viktor Glebov (1942–1945), Glebov was originally a colonel but was made a general-major in November 1942.

Since 1945 the division remained as part of the Group of Soviet Forces in Germany, where it became 21st Guards Mechanised Division, then 21st Guards Motor Rifle Division on 17 May 1957. On 17 November 1964 it was renamed 27th Guards Motor Rifle Division. It remained in Germany until May 1991, when it was withdrawn to Totskoye in the Volga-Ural Military District.

On the withdrawal of the division to Totskoye on April 17, 1991, the 68th Guards Motor Rifle Regiment was merged with the 680th Motor Rifle Regiment of the 213th Motor Rifle Division of the Volga Military District and received a new number 506 (Military Unit Number 21617) with the preservation of its awards and honorary name.

The division has contributed many personnel for peacekeeping operations. The division was renamed the 21st Guards Motor Rifle Brigade on 1 June 2009, after the beginning of the 2008 Russian military reform.

=== Russian invasion of Ukraine (2024–present) ===
In 2024, the division was formed once again from the 21st Guards Motor Rifle Brigade having 3 regiments: the 433rd Regiment, the 506th Regiment and the 589th Regiment. In April–May 2024, the 27th Guards Motor Rifle Division fought on the Ocheretyne ledge in the area of the villages Berdychi, Semenivka, Orlivka and northwest of Avdiivka as part of the 2nd Guards Combined Arms Army. Since 18 July 2024, the division as part of Russian forces began an offensive with the goal of capturing the strategically important city of Pokrovsk.

== Composition ==
=== Composition in Germany, c. 1988 ===
Source: Craig Crofoot, GSFG manuscript available at www.microarmormayhem.com, and Holm 2015.

- Division Headquarters – Halle, East Germany 51° 29′ 40″ north, 11° 55′ 40″ east
- 68th Guards Motor Rifle Regiment (BMP) – Halle 51° 26′ 30″ north, 11° 56′ 50″ east
- 243rd Guards Motor Rifle Regiment (BTR) – Halle 51° 29′ 40″ north, 11° 55′ 40″ east
- 244th Guards Motor Rifle Regiment (BTR) – Schlotheim 51° 15′ 50″ north, 10° 38′ 30″ east
- 28th Tank Regiment – Halle 51° 29′ 40″ north, 11° 55′ 40″ east
- 54th Guards Self-Propelled Artillery Regiment – Halle 51° 29′ 40″ north, 11° 55′ 40″ east
- 286th Guards Anti-Aircraft Missile Regiment – Halle 51° 29′ 40″ north, 11° 55′ 40″ east
- 488th Independent Anti-Tank Battalion – Halle 51° 29′ 40″ north, 11° 55′ 40″ east
- 5th Independent Reconnaissance & Radio EW Battalion – Mühlhausen 51° 12′ 20″ north, 10° 27′ 00″ east
- 35th Independent Guards Signals Battalion – Halle 51° 29′ 40″ north, 11° 55′ 40″ east
- 29th Independent Guards Engineer-Sapper Battalion – Halle 51° 26′ 40″ north, 11° 57′ 10″ east
- 44th Repair-Reconstruction Battalion
- 367th Independent Chemical Defence Battalion
- 21st Independent Medical-Sanitation Battalion
- 1126th Independent Material Support Battalion
- 327th independent Helicopter Squadron – Schlotheim

=== Composition c. 2001 ===
Source: warfare.ru

- HQ 27th Motor Rifle Division [2nd Combined-Arms Army]
  - 81st Motor Rifle Regiment, Samara [27th MRD](Agentstvo Voyennykh Novostey, 5 Mar 01; 21 Jan 03).
  - 152nd Tank Regiment(Agentstvo Voyennykh Novostey, 13 Sep 01).
  - 433rd Motor Rifle Regiment [27th MRD](Agentstvo Voyennykh Novostey, 13 Sep 01).

=== Composition in 2024 ===
- HQ;
- 433rd Don Cossacks Red Banner Motor Rifle Regiment
- 506th Guards Poznan Red Banner, Order of Suvorov Motor Rifle Regiment
- 589th Guards Berlin Red Banner, Order of Kutuzov Motor Rifle Regiment
- 268th Guards Self-Propelled Artillery Poznan Red Banner, Order of Kutuzov Regiment
- 1107th Separate Anti-Tank Artillery Regiment
- 838th Separate Anti-Aircraft Missile Regiment
- 907th Separate Reconnaissance Battalion
- 1614th Separate Engineer-Sapper Battalion
- 834th Separate Communications Battalion
- 140th Separate Logistics Battalion
- 341st Separate Medical Battalion
- Separate Electronic Warfare Battalion
- Separate UAV company

== Commanders ==
- Colonel Konstantin Vindushev (28 May–15 July 1942)
- Colonel Viktor Glebov (15 July 1942 – 26 October 1946; promoted major general 27 November 1942)
- Major General Dmitry Bakanov (acting, 26 October 1946 – 20 January 1947)
- Major General Boris Anisimov (11 January 1947 – 26 February 1948)
- Major General Ivan Burmakov (26 February 1948 – 2 August 1950)
- Colonel Aleksandr Klopov (2 August 1950 – 29 September 1952)
- Colonel Mikhail Frolenkov (29 September 1952 – 24 April 1956; promoted major general 31 May 1954)
- Colonel Georgy Ivanishchev (26 May 1956 – 24 July 1958)
- Colonel Ivan Katyshkin (24 July 1958 – 10 December 1960; promoted major general 7 May 1960)
- Colonel Aleksandr Mironov (10 December 1960 – 13 May 1965; promoted major general 27 April 1962)
- Colonel Nikolay Storch (13 May 1965 – 5 September 1968; promoted major general 16 June 1965)
- Colonel Boris Borodin (5 September 1968 – 19 July 1973; promoted major general 6 November 1970)
- Colonel Zhansen Kereyev (19 July 1973 – 17 July 1975; promoted major general 25 April 1975)
- Colonel Boris Krylov (17 July 1975 – 5 April 1978; promoted major general 14 February 1978)
- Colonel Mikhail Moiseyev (5 April 1978 – 21 June 1980; promoted major general 16 February 1979)
- Colonel Anatoly Ushakov (21 June 1980 – 15 June 1984; promoted major general 16 December 1982)
- Colonel Valery Nikitin (21 June 1984 – 1 May 1987)
- Colonel Aleksandr Zhurov (2 May 1987 – 5 December 1990; promoted major general 25 April 1990)
- Colonel Valery Gubarenko (6 December 1990 – 26 July 1991)
- Colonel Aleksandr Kosyakov (27 July 1991 – 23 June 1992; promoted major general 18 December 1991)
- Major General Anatoly Sidyakin (1992–1995)
- Major General Averyanov (1995–1999)
- Major General Aleksandr Protchenko (September 1999 – 2002)
- Major General Vladimir Zarudnitsky (2002–2005)
- Colonel Aleksey Salmin (2005–at least 2007)
- Major General Dmitry Kovalenko (June 2008–June 2009)

== Bibliography ==
- Feskov, V.I.; Golikov, V.I.; Kalashnikov, K.A.; Slugin, S.A. (2013). Вооруженные силы СССР после Второй Мировой войны: от Красной Армии к Советской [The Armed Forces of the USSR after World War II: From the Red Army to the Soviet: Part 1 Land Forces] (in Russian). Tomsk: Scientific and Technical Literature Publishing. ISBN 9785895035306.
- 27-я гв. Омско - Новобугская стрелковая дивизия
- Bonn, Slaughterhouse: Handbook of the Eastern Front, 2005, p. 365
