= Roshchinsky, Republic of Bashkortostan =

Roshchinsky Рощинский
- Selo
- Location within Bashkortostan Location within Russia
- Coordinates: 53°44′N 55°55′E
- Country: Russia
- Region: Bashkortostan
- District: Sterlitamaksky District
- Time zone: UTC+5:00

Roshchinsky (Russian: Рощинский) is a rural locality (a selo) and the administrative centre of Roshchinsky Selsoviet, Sterlitamaksky District, Bashkortostan, Russia. The population was 1,957 as of 2010. There are 18 streets.

== Geography ==
Roshchinsky is located 16 km north of Sterlitamak (the district's administrative centre) by road. Asavo-Zubovo is the nearest rural locality.
