= 15th Separate Guards Motor Rifle Brigade =

Peacekeeping unit of the Russian army

15th Guards Motor Rifle Brigade
- Russian: 15-я отдельная гвардейская мотострелковая бригада
- Great emblem of the 15th Guards Motorized Rifle Brigade
- Active: 1 February 2005–Present
- Country: Russia
- Branch: Russian Ground Forces
- Type: Mechanized infantry
- Role: Peacekeeping
- Size: Brigade
- Part of: 2nd Guards Combined Arms Army, Central Military District
- Garrison/HQ: Roshchinsky, Volzhsky District, Samara Oblast; MUN 90600
- Nickname: Black Hussars
- Patron: Alexandra Feodorovna
- Equipment: Torn-MDM radio intelligence system
- Engagements: United Nations peacekeeping Abkhaz–Georgian conflict 2020 Nagorno-Karabakh war Russo-Ukrainian War
- Decorations: Order of Kutuzov, 2nd class
- Battle honours: Guards

Commanders
- Current commander: Major General Andrey Buylov

Insignia
- Brigade sleeve patch

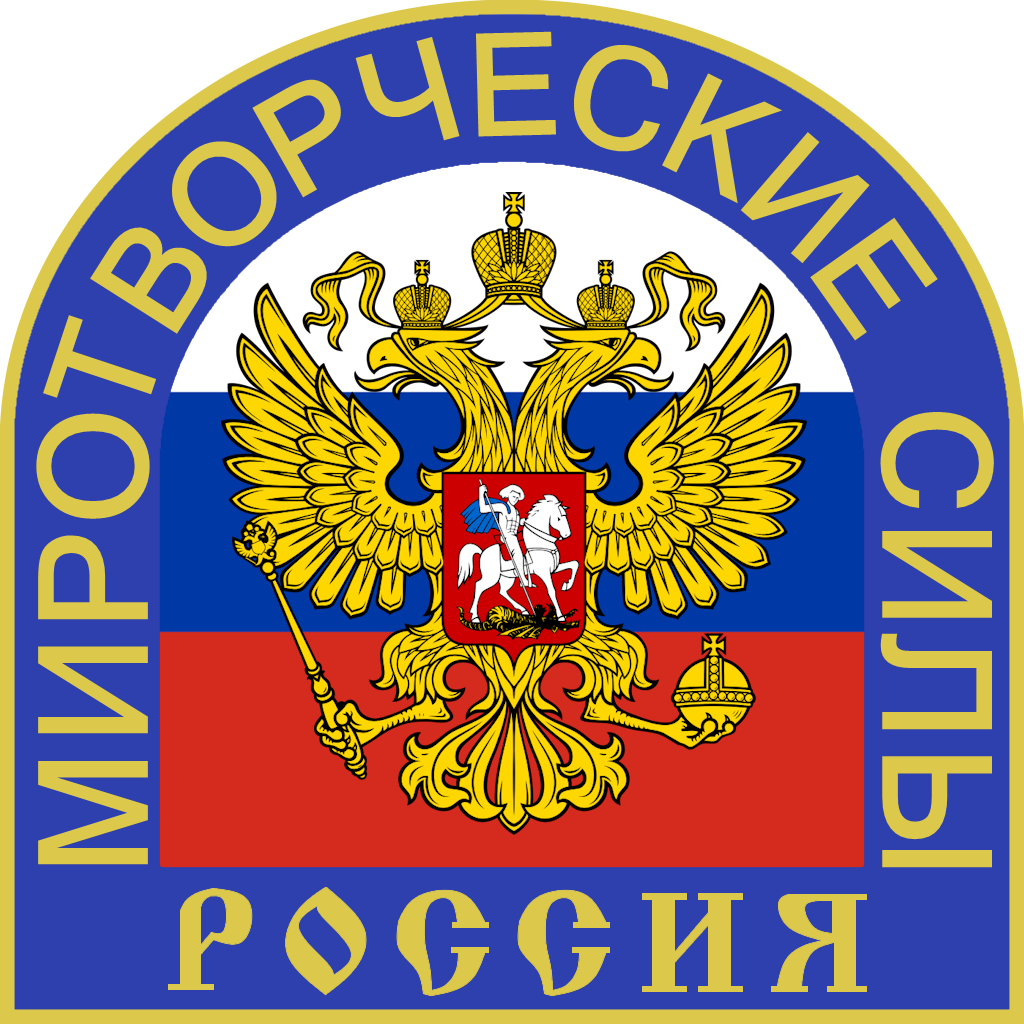
- Peacekeeping badge

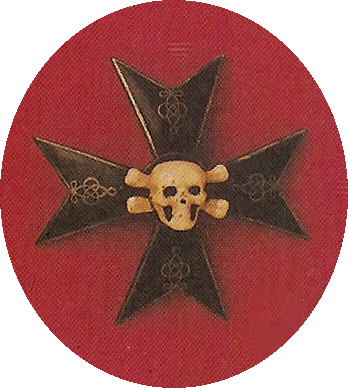
- Emblem

The 15th Guards Motor Rifle Alexandria (Peacekeeping) Brigade (Russian: 15-я отдельная гвардейская мотострелковая Александрийская бригада (миротворческая), romanized: 15-ya otdel'naya gvardeyskaya motostrelkovaya Aleksandriyskaya brigada (mirotvorcheskaya)), Military Unit Number 90600, is a unit in the Russian Ground Forces. It is the only named peacekeeping brigade in the Russian Armed Forces. The formation is part of the 2nd Guards Combined Arms Army of the Central Military District. It is based in Roshchinsky in Volzhsky District of Samara Oblast.

Its former honorifics were Berlin Red Banner Order of Kutuzov.

== Pre-history ==
The predecessor of the brigade is the 76th Guards Rifle Regiment, which was repeatedly renamed and reorganized.

The regiment traces its history back to the 75th Naval Rifle Brigade, formed during the Great Patriotic War from 29 October 1941 to December 1941, in Novokazalinsk in the Kazakh Soviet Socialist Republic.

On 17 March 1942, by order of the People's Commissar of Defence (NKO USSR) No. 78, the 75th Naval Rifle Brigade was awarded a Guards title, and on 18 March 1942 converted into the 3rd Guards Rifle Brigade. However, two months later, in May 1942, the brigade was reorganized into the 27th Guards Rifle Division, and all the units, formed as part of this military formation, as well as the division itself, inherit the Guards honorary name of their "ancestor" - the 3rd Guards Rifle Brigade.

One of these guards military units was the 76th Guards Rifle Regiment, formed in the same period as part of the 27th Guards Rifle Division, on the basis of one of the rifle battalions of the former 3rd Guards Rifle Brigade. Subsequently, for the courage and heroism shown by its personnel during the Battle of Berlin, on 11 June 1945 the regiment was awarded the honorary title "Berlin."

On 5 October 1945 it is transformed into the 69th Guards Mechanised Berlin Red Banner Order of Kutuzov Regiment; and in 1957 into the 243rd Guards Motor Rifle Berlin Red Banner Order of Kutuzov Regiment (Military Unit Number 47290). With the 27th Guards Rifle Division, from 1957 the 27th Guards Motor Rifle Division, it served for decades in East Germany as part of the 8th Guards Army, Group of Soviet Forces in Germany.

In 1991, the 27th Guards Motor Rifle Division was withdrawn from the Western Group of Forces and redeployed to Totskoye in the Volga-Ural Military District. On 17 June 1991 the 243rd Guards Motor Rifle Regiment was renamed as the 589th Guards Motor Rifle Berlin Red Banner Order of Kutuzov Regiment (Military Unit Number 32056), as part of the same 27th Guards Motor Rifle Division.

== Twenty-first century ==
The current brigade was formed on 1 February 2005 by redesignation of the 589th Guards MRR, in accordance with a directive of Minister of Defence Sergei Ivanov given on 30 December 2004. It was designed to participate in international peace and security missions under the auspices of the United Nations. From December 2005 to November 2008, the peacekeeping brigade carried out tasks of maintaining peace in the zone of the Abkhaz–Georgian conflict. Servicemen of the brigade have also been part of the peacekeeping contingents by decision of the President of Russia under the Commonwealth of Independent States, the Organization for Security and Co-operation in Europe, and the Shanghai Cooperation Organisation. Reported to have reached 100% contract service composition in 2005. In April 2008 the brigade was visited by the Minister of Defence of Japan. In August 2008 one unit took part in the Russo-Georgian War.

In 2011, the brigade was presented with a new type of battle banner. On 4 November 2019, the brigade was given the honorary title Alexandria, and a copy of the regimental standard of the 5th Alexandria Hussar Regiment of the 5th Cavalry Division of the Imperial Russian Army was awarded to the brigade. The title makes it one of several Armed Forces formations that honor formations of the Imperial era, and its Soviet-era honorifics were removed.

The brigade was awarded the honorary Guards title on 9 May 2022 in celebration of Victory Day for its "mass courage and heroism in the defense of the fatherland and state interests in military conflicts," the new title being 15th Separate Guards Alexandriyskaya Motor Rifle Brigade.

=== War in Ukraine ===
In 2014, reports from open sources claimed the presence of servicemen from the brigade in the Donbas during the Russo-Ukrainian War and the war in Donbas. In August, units of the brigade reportedly took part in the battles near Georgiyivka in the Lutuhyne Raion. At a briefing on 11 March 2015, the ATO headquarters stated that units of the 15th brigade were operating in the Luhansk Oblast, and on 17 April, the Chief of the Ukrainian General Staff Viktor Muzhenko, stated that units of the 15th brigade remained in the oblast. In October 2016, reports from open sources claimed the presence of servicemen from the brigade in the Donbas.

Reportedly, members of the brigade have taken part in the Russian invasion of Ukraine.

At the battle of Avdiivka the unit gained prominence for destroying an American M1 Abrams tank. The Lancet drone and FPV drone operators getting most of the credit for the destruction of the Abrams tank.

=== Karabakh conflict ===
In November 2020, after a peace agreement ending the war over the region, servicemen from the brigade were deployed to Nagorno-Karabakh to keep the peace. In the agreement, 1,960 servicemen of the brigade were to be sent to the region, leaving from Ulyanovsk Vostochny Airport on a Il-76 military transport aircraft. Outside of the servicemen, 90 armored personnel carriers and 380 units of automobile and special equipment were sent with the brigade. The command of the Russian peacekeeping forces was also established in the Karabakh capital of Stepanakert. On 11 November 2020, Lieutenant General Rustam Muradov was appointed the commander of the peacekeeping forces. On 13 December, the brigade's peacekeeping contingent took control of Hin Tagher.

In early 2021, Azerbaijani authorities accused the unit of "a pro-Armenia attitude, instead of taking the required neutral stance for the implementation of the peace agreement." Particularly, General Muradov's meeting with senior Artsakh figures, and the presence of the Artsakh flag at Muradov's meetings had resulted in negative reactions from the Azerbaijanis.

== Structure ==
- Directorate
- 1st Motorized Rifle Battalion
- 2nd Motorized Rifle Battalion
- 3rd Motorized Rifle Battalion
- Sniper Company
- Tank Battalion
- Anti-aircraft Missile Battalion
- Anti-aircraft Missile and Artillery Battalion
- Reconnaissance Battalion
- Engineer Battalion
- Control Battalion
- Repair and Recovery Battalion
- Logistics Battalion
- NBC Protection Company
- UAV company
- Electronic Warfare Company
- Commandant Company
- Medical Company
- Command Battery
- Control and Radar Reconnaissance Platoon
- Management Platoon
- Instructor Platoon
- Simulator Platoon
- Polygon
- Military band

The brigade is fully composed of contract servicemembers.

== Commanders ==
- Colonel Sergei Kuzovlev (2005–2008)
- Colonel Oleg Suvalov (2008–2010)
- Colonel Viktor Kindeev (2010)
- Colonel Konstantin Stepanishchev (2011–2013)
- Colonel Vitaly Gerasimov (2013–2014)
- Colonel Nikolay Zakharov (2014–2016)
- Colonel Alexey Avdeev (2016–2018)
- Colonel Konstantin Nechaev (2018–2020)
- Lieutenant Colonel Pavel Yershov (2020–2021)
- Lieutenant Colonel Andrei Marushkin (2021–2023)
- Major General Andrey Buylov (since 2023).

== Gallery ==
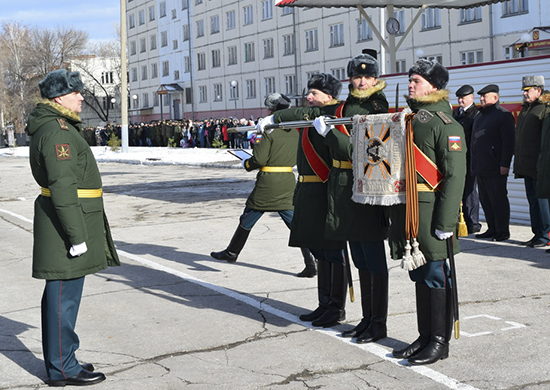
The ceremony of presenting the banner of the Alexandrian 5th Regiment of Hussars.

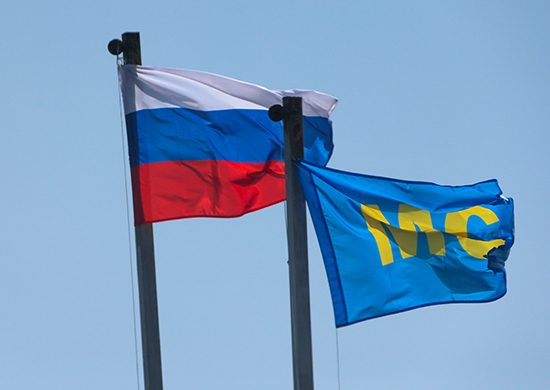
The Russian flag and the flag of the peacekeeping forces.

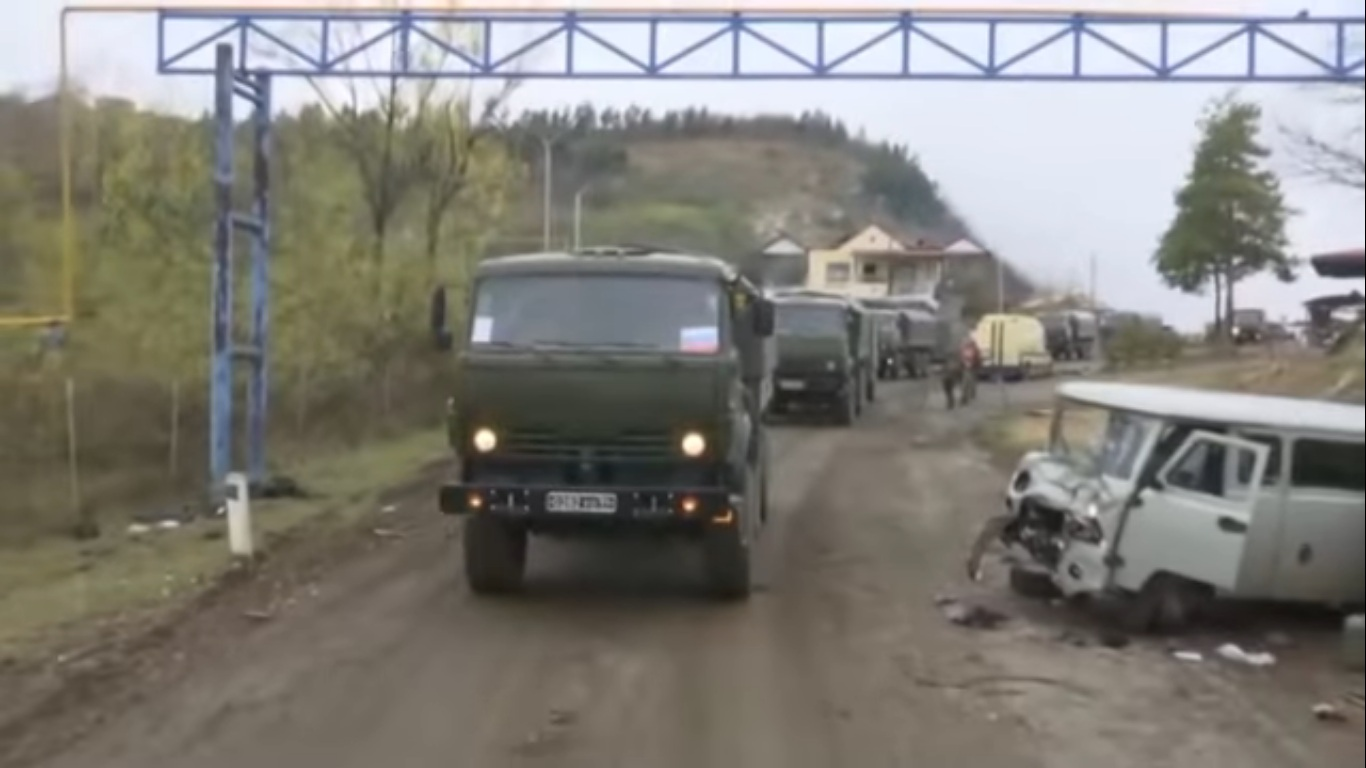
A convoy of Russian peacekeepers driving past an Azerbaijani checkpoint at the northern entrance to Shusha.

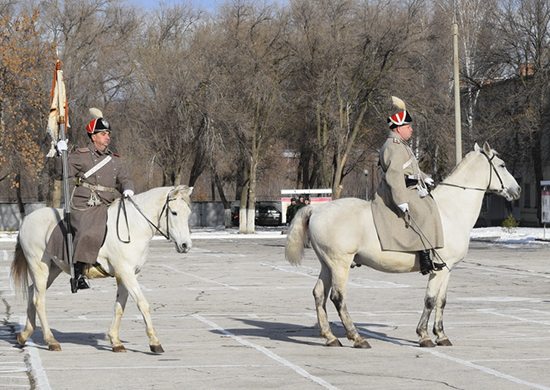
Ceremonial cavalry from the brigade.

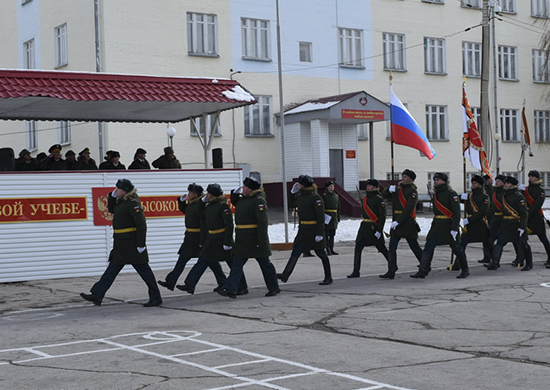
A unit parade of the brigade.

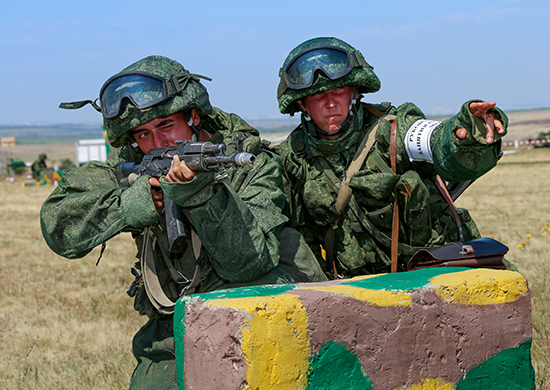
Brigade personnel training.

== See also ==
- Azerbaijani peacekeeping forces
- 12th Peacekeeping Brigade
- KAZBAT
- 22nd Peacekeeping Battalion (Moldova)
- Polish–Ukrainian Peace Force Battalion
