= 55th Mountain Motor Rifle Brigade =

55th Guards Mountain Motor Rifle Brigade
- Brigade insignia patch
- Active: 2015 – present
- Country: Russia
- Branch: Russian Ground Forces
- Type: Mechanized infantry
- Role: Mountain Warfare
- Size: Brigade
- Part of: 41st Combined Arms Army
- Garrison/HQ: Kyzyl
- Engagements: Russian invasion of Ukraine; Battle of Avdiivka; Battle of Ocheretyne

Commanders
- Current commander: Colonel Denis Barilo

The 55th Guards Mountain Motor Rifle Brigade (Russian:55-я отдельная гвардейская мотострелковая бригада (горная)) (Military Unit Number 55115) is a mechanized infantry brigade of the Russian Ground Forces. It is located in Kyzyl, Tyva Republic, as part of the 41st Combined Arms Army of the Central Military District.

== History ==
In April 2014, it was reported that a new mountain motor rifle brigade would be formed in Kyzyl, Tyva Republic, in 2015. In July 2014 Krasnaya Zvezda wrote that the organizational core of the future brigade had already arrived in Tuva. Colonel Andrei Shelukhin, head of the organizing group, and many of his subordinates arrived in Tuva from mountainous Tajikistan "so they had experience in conquering peaks." On June 28, 2014, a Snow Leopard mountaineering club team, together with officers of the mountain brigade Kydykbek Sheripov and Alexander Umrikhin, climbed the highest peak of Tuva and all of Eastern Siberia - Mount Mongun-Taiga (Silver Taiga), "and now their pennants are flying at the height of 3,976 meters." The head of government in Tuva, Sholban Kara-ool, reportedly ordered that each of the future mountain rifle candidates also had a recommendation signed by the relevant district official. The article also said that high-ranking officials made no attempts to avoid military service for their sons.

The brigade was formed in November 2015. 1047 of the 1300 servicemen were natives of Tuva.

In 2016, a military townlet for its accommodation was completed.

In November 2018, an unmanned aerial vehicle unit was formed as part of the brigade, equipped with Orlan-10 and Eleron-3 drones.

It has been involved in the 2022 Russian invasion of Ukraine.

== Russo-Ukrainian war ==
Main articles: Russo-Ukrainian War and 2022 Russian invasion of Ukraine

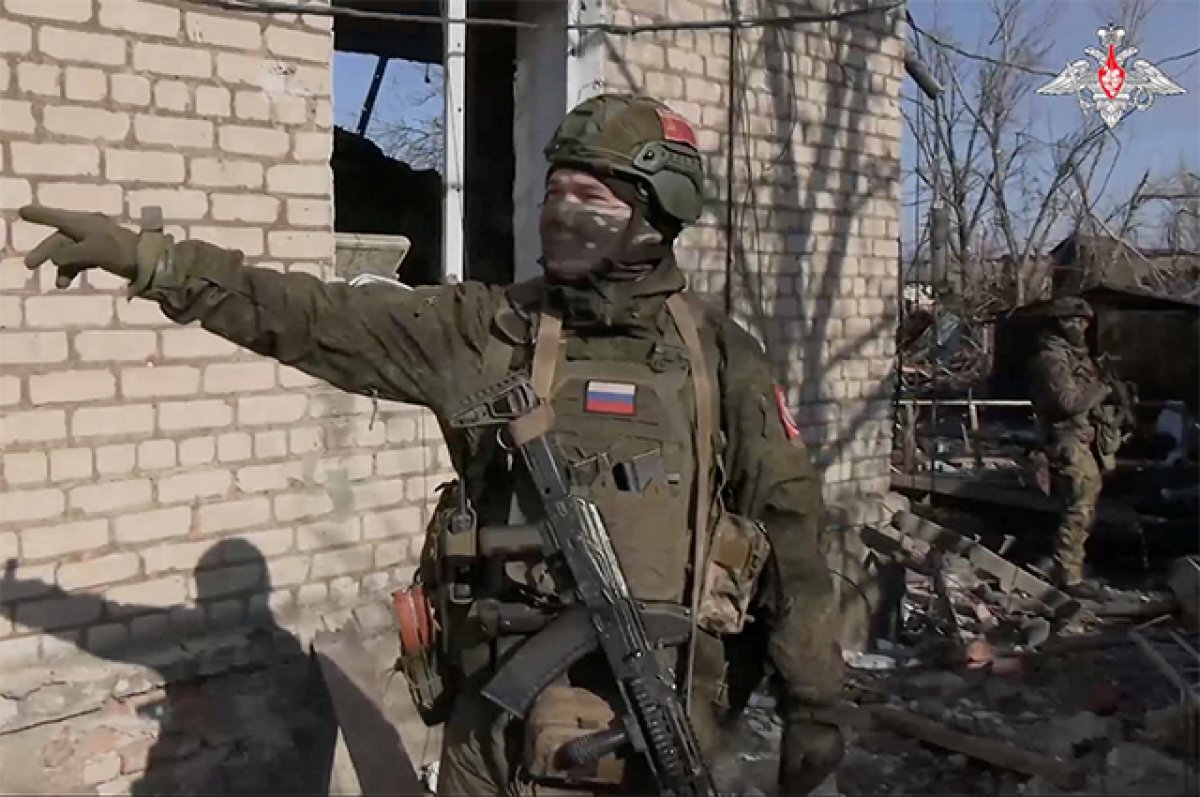
A Tuvan soldier of the 55th brigade in Avdiivka, 22 February 2024

On March 3, 2022, the troops of the brigade entered the village of Yahidne near Chernihiv. The troops stopped in the village and set up their headquarters in the local school. According to local residents, the military herded people into the basement of the school.

In August 2022, social media posts revealed that the brigade was operating in the direction of Siversk, a town in the Donetsk Oblast.

The brigade participated in the battle of Avdiivka.
