= 385th Guards Artillery Brigade =

385th Guards Odesskaya Red Banner Order of Bogdan Khmelnitsky Artillery Brigade
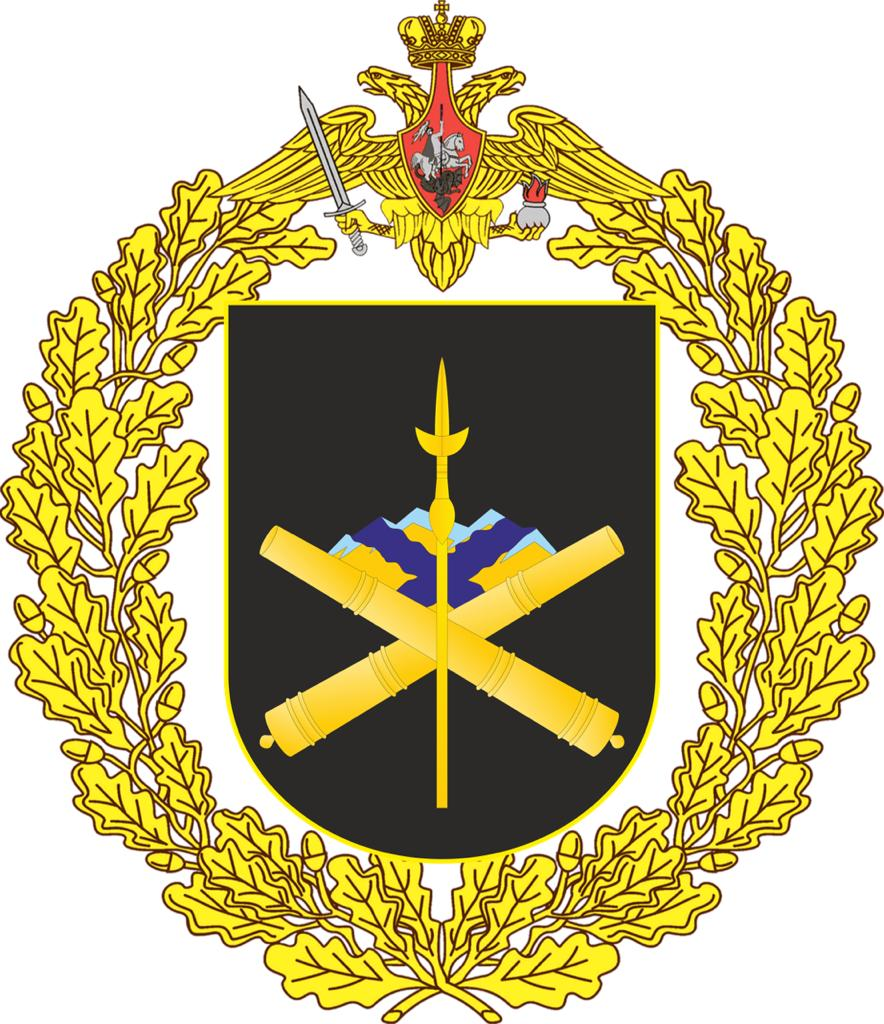
- Great Emblem of the Brigade
- Active: 1981–present
- Country: Soviet Union (1981–1991); Russia (1991-present)
- Branch: Russian Ground Forces
- Part of: 2nd Guards Combined Arms Army
- Garrison/HQ: Totskoye, Orenburg Oblast
- Decorations: Order of the Red Banner; Order of Bogdan Khmelnitsky

The 385th Guards Odesskaya Red Banner Order of Bogdan Khmelnitsky Artillery Brigade (Military Unit Number 32755) (Russian: 385-я гвардейская артиллерийская бригада) is an artillery formation of the Russian Ground Forces. It traces its history to the establishment of the 44th Guards Cannon Artillery Brigade (Russian: 44-я гвардейская пушечная артиллерийская бригада) on 20 May 1944, during World War II.

== History ==
From 24 May 1944 to 5 September 1944 it fought as part of the 5th Shock Army of the 3rd Ukrainian Front; it was then withdrawn into the Reserve of the Supreme High Command on 6 September 1944; and then from 30 October 1944 to 9 May 1945 it fought again with the 5th Shock Army, but by this time the 5th Shock Army was under the command of the 1st Belorussian Front.

A VGK order of 19 April 1944 gave it the honorific name "Odessa."

It is located at Totskoye, Orenburg Oblast, in the Central Military District, currently part of the 2nd Guards Combined Arms Army.

From 1945 to 1992, the brigade was part of the 3rd Shock Army, which became the 3rd Red Banner Combined Arms Army in 1954.

The brigade in its present form was established in August 1981 from the previous 98th Guards Cannon Artillery Regiment. It returned from Planken in East Germany to Totskoye in 1993.

The brigade is now fighting as part of the Russian invasion of Ukraine, as part of the group of forces deployed from the Central Military District.
