= 24th Separate Guards Special Forces Brigade =

Russian special forces brigade

24th Separate Guards Order of Zhukov Special Forces Brigade
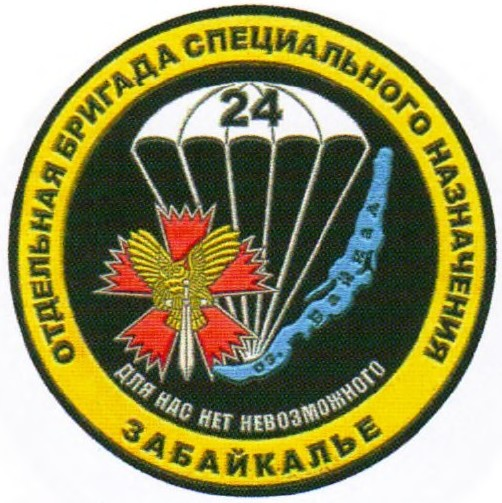
- 24th Separate Guards Special Forces Brigade Patch
- Active: 1 November 1977–present
- Country: Soviet Union (1977–1991); Russia (1991–Present)
- Branch: Russian Ground Forces
- Type: Spetsnaz
- Role: Special forces
- Part of: GRU (operational subordination)
- Garrison/HQ: Novosibirsk
- Anniversaries: unknown
- Engagements: Soviet–Afghan War; First Chechen War; Russo-Ukrainian War: Second Battle of Lyman; Pokrovsk offensive
- Battle honours: Guards, Order of Zhukov

The 24th Separate Guards Order of Zhukov Special Forces Brigade (Russian: 24-й отдельной гвардейская ордена Жукова бригады специального назначения, romanized: 24-y otdelnoy gvardeyskaya ordena Zhukova brigady spetsialnogo naznacheniya) is a special forces (spetsnaz) brigade of the Armed Forces of the Russian Federation.

It had its origins in a separate company of special designation of the Main Intelligence Directorate (the GRU). On 1 October 1961, in accordance with the directive of the General Staff of the USSR Armed Forces No. OSH/2/347491 dated 26 August 1961, the 806th independent Company of Special Designation (or in Western terms Special Forces) (Military Unit 64656) numbering 117 people was formed in the Transbaikal Military District with direct subordination to the district headquarters.

The 24th Spetsnaz Brigade was established on 1 November 1977 at Nara-Byrka (Yasnaya), Chita Oblast, in the Transbaikal Military District at a former R-16 (SS-7) Strategic Rocket Forces support site, by expanding the previous company. Initially, only a command team and the 1st Battalion were deployed. In 1980, the 2nd battalion was deployed.

In 1988, the brigade was transferred to Kykhta, Buryatia, in 2002, to Sosnovyy-Bor, Buryatskaya and in 2012 to Novosibirsk.

== Structure ==
- 24th Separate Guards Special Forces Brigade
  - Brigade HQ
    - Signals Company
    - Special Weapons Company
    - Logistics Unit
  - 281st Special Purpose Detachment
  - 297th Special Purpose Detachment
  - 641th Special Purpose Detachment
  - "Vega" Spetsnaz Detachment

== History ==
=== Afghanistan ===
In 1984, the 281st separate special forces unit was formed on the basis of the 24th obrSpN and sent to fight in the Soviet–Afghan War.

=== Chechnya ===
The 281st separate special forces unit fought in the First Chechen War in 1994–1996.

=== North Caucasus ===
The brigade formed a combined unit that conducted reconnaissance and combat operations in the North Caucasus from 5 September to 26 December 2000. After a six-month deployment to the North Caucasus, the detachment (1st b-n) returned to the place of permanent deployment in December 2006. As of October 2012, the combined battalion was deployed to Ingushetia.

=== 2022 Russian invasion of Ukraine ===
This brigade participated in the invasion of Ukraine in 2022. On 31 May, President Vladimir Putin granted Guard status to the GRU/GU's 24th Spetsnaz Brigade. The brigade reportedly played a key role in the fighting in Lyman. The brigade then participated in the Pokrovsk offensive.
