= Roshchinsky, Samara Oblast =

Roshchinsky Ро́щинский
- Urban-type settlement
- Interactive map of Roshchinsky
- Location of Roshchinsky Roshchinsky (Samara Oblast)
- Coordinates: 53°03′14″N 50°28′54″E
- Country: Russia
- Federal subject: Samara Oblast
- Administrative district: Volzhsky District
- Founded: 1993

Population (2010 Census)
  - Total: 11,920
  - Estimate (2021): 8,128 (−31.8%)
- Time zone: UTC+4 (MSK+1)
- Postal code: 443539
- OKTMO ID: 36614156051

Roshchinsky (Russian: Ро́щинский) is an urban locality (an urban-type settlement) in Volzhsky District of Samara Oblast, Russia. Population: 8,128 (2021 Census); 11,920 (2010 Census); 12,878 (2002 Census).

== History ==
It started as a small village in 1932. The first military garrison was established here in 1933; several more were organized by the 1960s–1970s. The primary purpose of the garrisons was to train the troops before sending them to East Germany. After the re-unification of Germany in 1990, 100,000 Soviet troops were moved back to Russia, and Roshchinsky became one of the destinations for the returning troops, including the 3rd Guards Spetsnaz Brigade, and the 589th Guards Motor Rifle Regiment (later to become the 15th Guards Separate Motor Rifle Brigade).

The military garrisons were incorporated as an urban-type settlement and named Roshchinsky on June 29, 1999. The name was officially approved by the federal government of June 5, 2000.
