= Guards unit (Soviet Union) =

Former Soviet Union elite military units

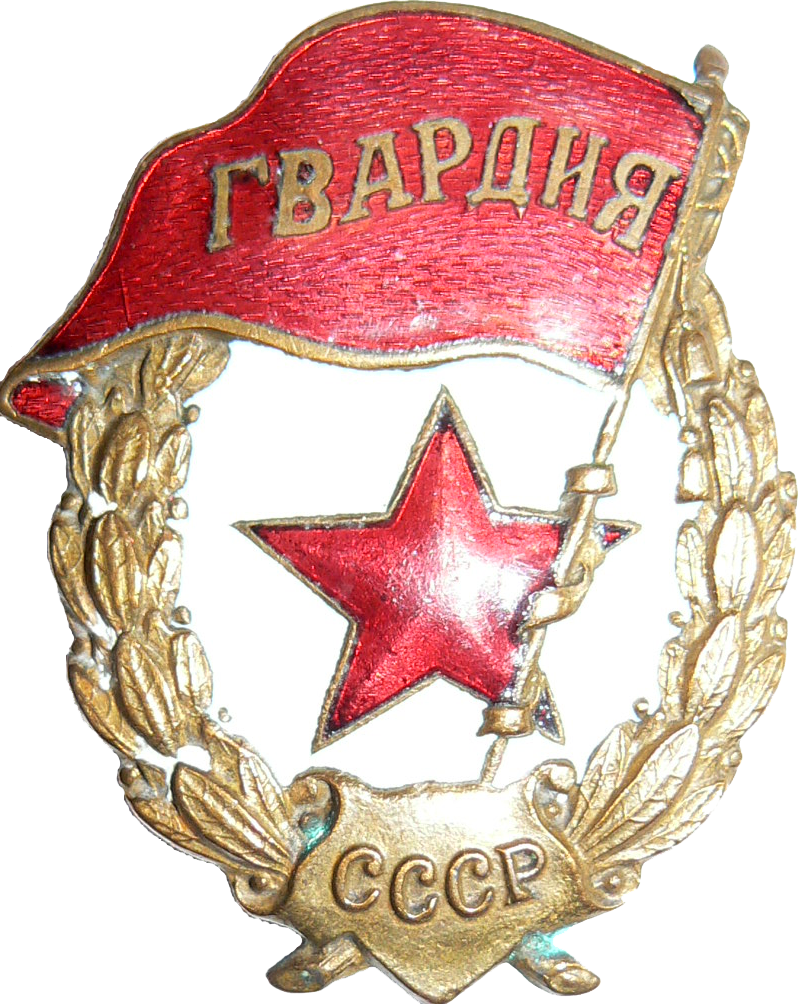
Soviet Guards badge worn by members of Guards units

Guards units (Russian: Гвардия, romanized: Gvardiya) were elite units and formations in the Soviet Armed Forces that continue to exist in the Russian Armed Forces and other post-Soviet states. These units were awarded Guards status after distinguishing themselves in wartime service, and are considered to have elite status. The Guards designation originated during World War II, its name coming both from the Russian Imperial Guard, and the old Bolshevik Red Guards. Practical benefits of the status included double pay for ordinary soldiers, usually priority in equipment and replacements, and the designation often served as a morale-boosting source of unit pride.

== History ==
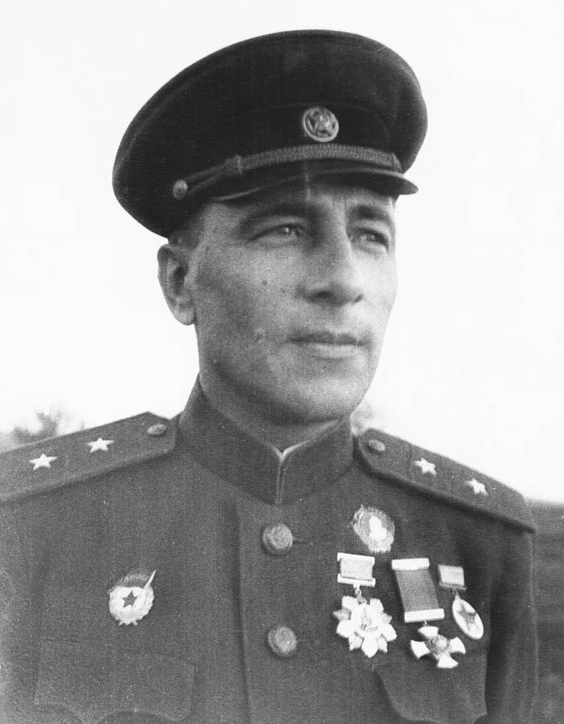
Soviet general Mikhail Katukov wearing his Guards insignia, 1943

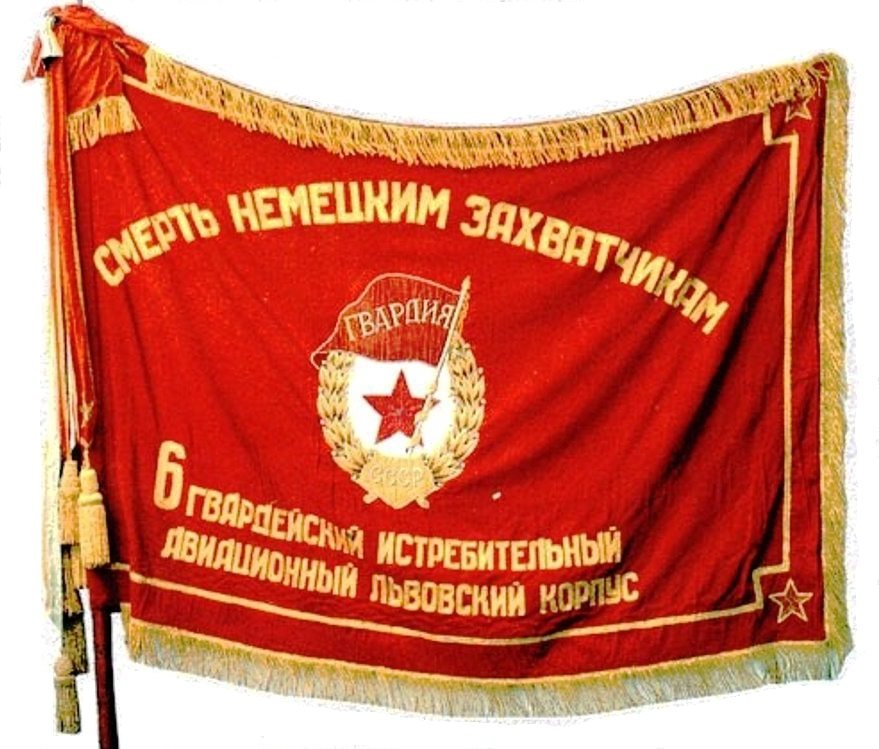
The Guards battle flag of the 6th Guards Fighter Aviation Corps

The title of "Guards" within the Soviet Armed Forces was first introduced on 18 September 1941, at the direction of the Headquarters of the Supreme High Command (Stavka). By order No. 308 of the People's Commissar of Defence, the 100th, 127th, 153rd and 161st Rifle Divisions were renamed the 1st, 2nd, 3rd and 4th Guards Rifle Divisions, respectively, for their distinguished service during the 1941 Yelnya Offensive. The Soviet 316th Rifle Division was renamed the 8th Guards Rifle Division on 18 November 1941, following the actions of the Panfilovtsy and was given the Panfilovskaya title in honor of its late commander Ivan Panfilov. By the end of 1941, the 107th, 120th, 64th, 316th, 78th, and 52nd Rifle Divisions had become the 5th through 10th Guards Rifle Divisions. By the end of World War II, over 4,500 units, formations, and ships had received the Guards designation, including eleven field armies, six tank armies, 40 rifle corps, and 117 rifle divisions. However, not all Guards units received their status through combat: all artillery units equipped with Katyusha multiple-rocket launchers were designated Guards Mortar units upon formation. Airborne units, already considered elite, also formed as Guards rather than receiving the status through combat action. Some twenty Guards Airborne Brigades were converted into the 11th–16th Guards Rifle Divisions in December 1943.

The introduction of the title marked a shift away from the revolutionary symbolism of the Red Army, as it referenced the Russian Imperial Guards of the pre-1917 Russian Empire. The units and formations awarded the Soviet Guard title received special Guards colors in accordance with the decision of the Presidium of the Supreme Soviet of the USSR. On 21 May 1942, the Presidium of the Supreme Soviet of the USSR introduced Guards ranks, which allowed soldiers of Guards units to prepend the designation to their ranks, for example a major in a Guards unit could be referred to as "Guards Major" (Russian: гвардии майор, romanized: gvardii maior); a Guards soldier could be a Guardsman (Russian: гвардеец, romanized: gvardeyets) rather than a just a Red Army man (Russian: красноармеец, romanized: krasnoarmeyets). The decree also introduced Guards badges to be worn of the right side of the chest in all uniforms to distinguish those in Guards units from others. The institution of distinctive colors extended to Guards field armies and corps in June 1943.

Guards status was more than just a decoration and had practical benefits for those serving in such units: enlisted personnel in Guards units received twice as much pay as those in other units, and non-commissioned officers and above received 1.5 times the pay of their counterparts in other units. Such rewards of Guards status meant that it often acted as a morale booster and increased unit cohesion, with soldiers writing letters home about being awarded the status. Guards status also resulted in higher priority for replacements and equipment than with normal units, although they were still often understrength by 1944 due to high casualty-rates and their frequent deployment in offensives. In an effort to keep Guards units elite, the People's Commissariat of Defense directed in December 1941 that wounded Guards personnel, excluding only the most seriously wounded, should be sent to hospitals close to the front line so that they could return to their own units, to preserve the "special nature" of their personnel and "military traditions". These efforts were emphasized in a February 1944 General Staff document that warned of locals from occupied territory, potential "criminal elements and traitors to the Motherland", being enlisted into Guards units during the Red Army's hasty late-war enlistment of civilians in areas that they passed through. In spite of these efforts, the unit cohesion of Guards units could be affected by replacement quality, as exemplified by army commander Vasily Chuikov's January 1943 evaluation that Guards units were not "all that different" from other divisions, which mentioned desertions from the 13th Guards Rifle Division. Guards fighter-units of the air force also made efforts to retain personnel, with the 9th Guards Fighter Aviation Regiment (granted Guards status on 7 March 1942) concentrating aces each with over ten victories.

From March 1942, Guards rifle divisions were organized along a different table of organization and equipment from standard rifle divisions that increased their allocation of personnel, artillery and infantry-support weapons. The Guards rifle divisions received an organic SU-76 assault gun battalion to replace their towed anti-tank gun unit in December 1944, which standard rifle divisions did not include until after the end of the war. While normal rifle divisions would become seriously understrength as the war progressed and the manpower-pool of infantry conscripts declined, efforts were made to keep Guards rifle divisions at higher strength: a guards rifle division was authorized to comprise 10,670 soldiers compared to the 9,435 of its normal counterpart. On a wider scale, such benefits of Guards status were reflected in the field armies designated Guards, which were assigned one or two tank or mechanized corps to conduct encirclements of German defenders after their success in the Battle of Stalingrad. The Guards armies tended to have proportionally more artillery and tanks assigned than normal field armies. A Stavka order of April 1943 stipulated that Guards corps and armies were to be used only for offensives or counterattacks and withdrawn from the frontline for training instead of suffering losses in prolonged defense.

After the end of the war, the Guards armies that had taken major roles in the final defeat of Germany and the Battle of Berlin were rewarded by being chosen as the units to garrison the Soviet occupation zone of Germany; they would later become the core of the Group of Soviet Forces in Germany that confronted the NATO forces stationed in West Germany during the Cold War.

Since the 1991 break-up of the Soviet Union, Guards designations for military units have been retained by Belarus, Russia, Kazakhstan and Kyrgyzstan. Ukraine retained the Guards designations until 2016 when it broke away from its Soviet military traditions due to the War in Donbas. The 22nd Separate Guards Spetsnaz Brigade became the first Russian Armed Forces unit to be awarded the title in 2001, for its performance during the Second Chechen War of 1999 to 2009. In subsequent years, more Russian units received the title, including several during the 2022 Russian invasion of Ukraine.

== Badges ==
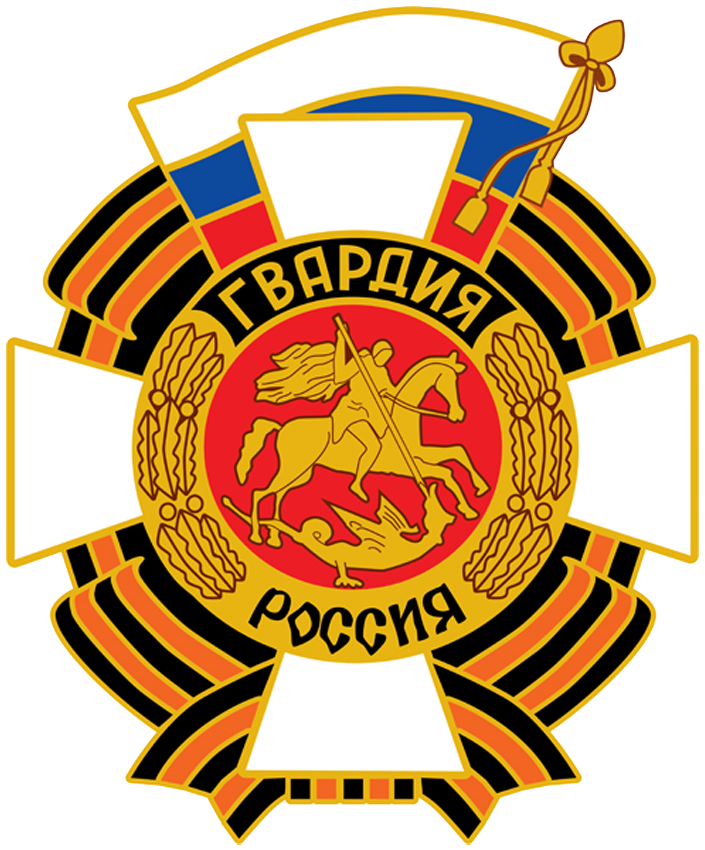
Former Russian Guards badge (1994–2010)

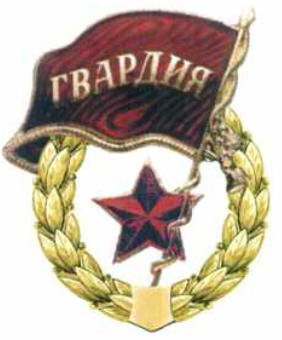
Former Russian Guards badge (2011–2024)

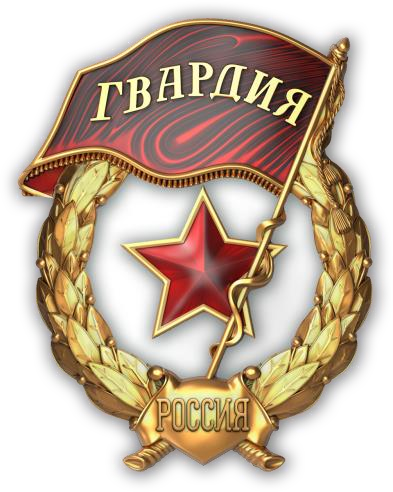
Current Russian Guards badge (2024–present)

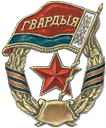
Belarusian Guards badge

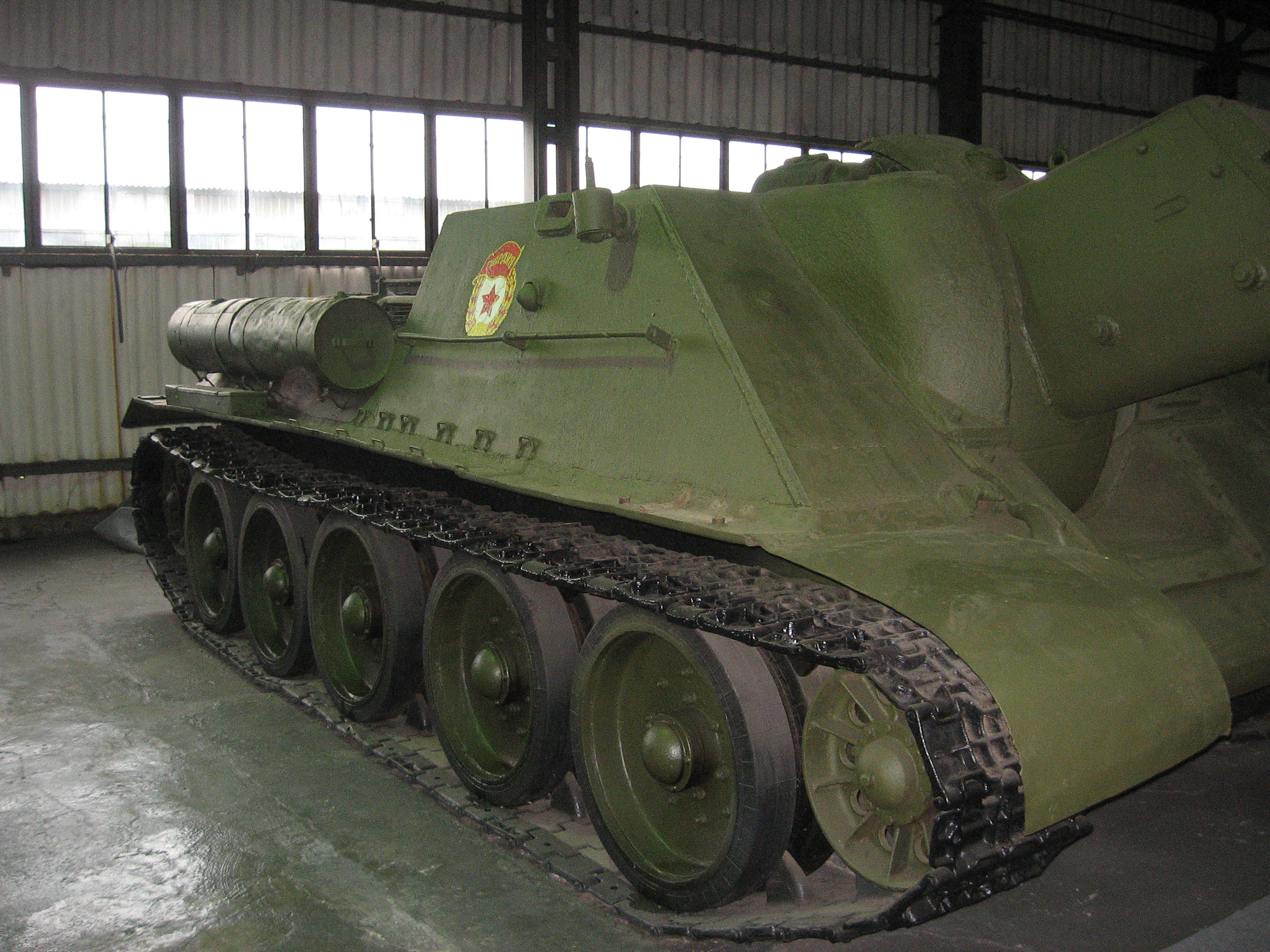
Soviet Guards emblem on an SU-122 self-propelled gun

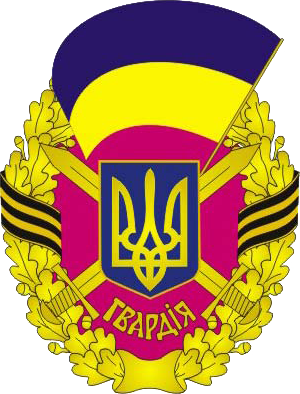
Ukrainian Guards badge (until 2016)

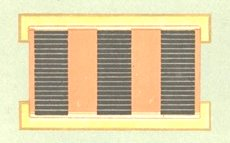
Gilded Guards badge worn by naval officers and warrant officers (1942–1961)

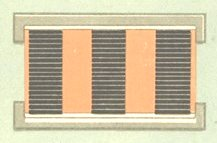
Silver Guards badge worn by enlisted and non-commissioned officers (1942–1961)

Naval ensign was used by Guards warships and warboats of the Soviet Navy (1942–1950)

Naval ensign was used by Guards Red Banner warships and warboats of the Soviet Navy (1950–1992)

Naval ensign was used by Guards border ships and boats of the Soviet Border Troops (1950–1964)

SVG recreation of Soviet Guards badge

Guards badge of the Korean People's Army

Obverse side of the flag of the Korean People's Army only for Guards units (1948–1961)

Reverse side of the flag of the Korean People's Army only for Guards units (1948–1961)

Obverse side of the flag of the Korean People's Army 105th Armored Division (2023–present)

Reverse side of the flag of the Korean People's Army 105th Armored Division (2023–present)

Naval ensign for Korean People's Navy Guards units

== See also ==
- List of Soviet divisions 1917–1945 has an almost complete list of Soviet Guards divisions.
- List of army units called Guards
- List of guards units of Russia
- List of guards units of Ukraine
- Russian Guards
- Charles Thau
