= Pyotr Bolgarev =

Russian army officer

- Пётр Николаевич Болгарев
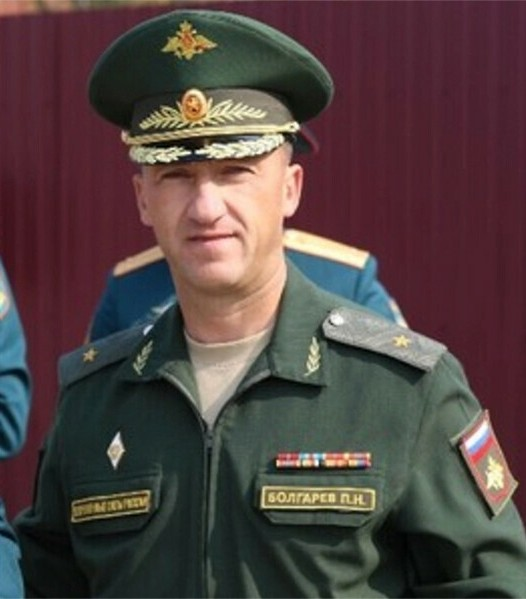
- Bolgarev in September 2020
- Born: Pyotr Nikolayevich Bolgarev; 20 January 1977 (age 49); Pozdeyevka, Amur Oblast, Russia, Soviet Union
- Military career
- Allegiance: Soviet Union; Russia
- Branch: Russian Ground Forces
- Rank: Colonel general
- Commands: Eastern Military District (since 5 August 2026)
- Conflicts: Russo-Ukrainian War

Pyotr Nikolayevich Bolgarev (Russian: Пётр Николаевич Болгарев; born on 20 January 1977), is a Russian army officer who is the commander of the Eastern Military District and group of forces "East" since 5 August 2026.

== Biography ==
Pyotr Bolgarev was born on 20 January 1977 to his father, Nikolay, in Pozdeyevka, Amur Oblast.

Regarding his family life have not been disclosed. Furthermore, there is no confirmed information about his education or early military service.

He graduated from the Blagoveshchensk Higher Tank Command School.

In 2013, Bolgarev served as acting commander of the 70th Motor Rifle Brigade, stationed in Primorsky Krai. In 2015, with the rank of colonel, he commanded the 5th Guards Tank Brigade. According to Ukrainian intelligence, during the same period, Bolgarev was reportedly transferred to eastern Ukraine to support pro-Russian separatists in the Donbas, becoming the commander of the 4th Separate Motorized Rifle Brigade of the Lugansk People's Republic militia (2nd Army Corps). In December 2016, he was promoted to Major General.

From 2016 to 2018, he served as commander of the 150th Guards Motor Rifle Division of the Southern Military District. Later, he was deputy commander of the 11th Army Corps.

At the time Russia's invasion of Ukraine began, Bolgarev held was the Deputy Commander of the 36th Army of the Eastern Military District.

Later, Bolgarev took command of the 29th Combined Arms Army of the Eastern Military District stationed in the Zabaykalsky Krai. In late 2022, he reported that the army was actively participating in combat operations. In November 2023, Russian President Vladimir Putin promoted Bolgarev to lieutenant general.

Later, Bolgarev was appointed Chief of Staff of the Vostok (East) Group of Forces operating in the south Donetsk direction.

On 5 August 2026, President Putin announced that Bolgarev had taken command of the Eastern Military District.

His candidacy was proposed by Colonel General Andrey Ivanayev, who had in turn been appointed commander of the Central Military District.
