= Mikhail Nosulev =

Russian military leader

- Михаил Яковлевич Носулев
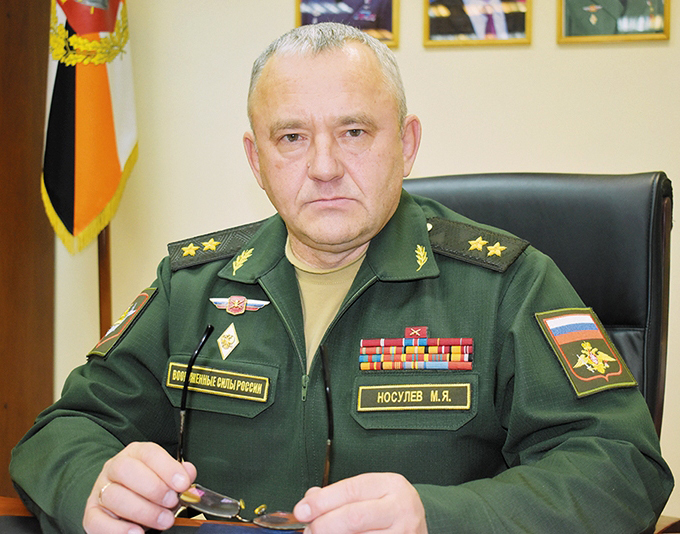
- Nolusev in 2019
- Born: Mikhail Yakovlyevich Nosulev; 8 November 1964 (age 61); Labinsk, Russian SFSR, Soviet Union
- Military career
- Allegiance: Soviet Union; Russia
- Branch: Russian Ground Forces
- Service years: 1982–present
- Rank: Lieutenant general
- Commands: Eastern Military District (acting) (6 April 2023 - 20 April 2023)
- Conflicts: Syrian Civil War

Mikhail Yakovlyevich Nosulev (Russian: Михаил Яковлевич Носулев; born on 8 November 1964), is a Russian army officer who was acting Commander of the Eastern Military District in April 2023, and has held the rank of Lieutenant General since 2019.

== Biography ==
Mikhail Nosulev was born on 8 November 1964 in the city of Labinsk, Krasnodar Krai.

In November 1982 Nosulev was drafted into the Soviet Armed Forces. He began his service in the training unit as a driver-mechanic of PTS-Ms in Volzhsky, Volgograd Oblast). In April 1983 he was deployed to Afghanistan during the Soviet–Afghan War. He served in a separate engineer-sapper battalion as a driver of a floating armored personnel carrier, where he was wounded in battle. For the fulfillment of international duty, he was presented with the medal "For Distinction in Military Service", 2nd degree. In 1984, he was enrolled as a cadet in the Ulyanovsk Guards Higher Tank Command School named after V. I. Lenin.

In 1988, Nosulev graduated from the Ulyanovsk Guards Higher Tank Command School. The same year, he was sent to the Group of Soviet Forces in Germany, as a commander of a tank platoon in the 204th Guards Motor Rifle Regiment of the 94th Guards Motor Rifle Zvenigorod-Berlin Division. In June 1991 he was appointed commander of a tank company. For a prize-winning place among the commanders of tank companies of the Western Group of Forces, he was awarded the rank of captain ahead of schedule.

In March 1993, Nosulev was the chief of staff of a tank battalion. After the disbandment of the Western Group of Forces, he was sent to serve in the Far East in Khabarovsk. In the same year, he entered the Malinovsky Military Armored Forces Academy. After graduating from the academy in 1996, he was appointed commander of a tank battalion in the 182nd Tank Regiment of the 20th Guards Motor Rifle Division, in Volgograd. In March 1998 he was appointed commander of the 428th Separate Tank Bobruisk Battalion (Maxim Gorky settlement, Gorodishchensky District, Volgograd Oblast) of the 20th Guards Motor Rifle Division. For successfully conducted exercises with tanks crossing the Don River along the bottom, he was awarded the rank of lieutenant colonel ahead of schedule.

In March 2000, Nosulev was appointed deputy commander of the 242nd Guards Motor Rifle Regiment Zaleshchitsky (Kamyshin, Volgograd Oblast). In May 2003, he was the commander of the 70th Guards Motor Rifle Regiment of the 42nd Guards Motor Rifle Division in Shali, Chechen Republic. In October 2006, he was the Chief of Staff of the 12th military base (Batumi, Republic of Adjara). In 2007, he was the Deputy Chief of Staff of the 58th Combined Arms Army, parts of which in August 2008 took part in the Russo-Georgian War.

In 2008, Nosulev entered the Military Academy of the General Staff of the Armed Forces of Russia. In 2010, he graduated from the Military Academy. That same year, he became the head of the 473rd District Training Centre (training of junior specialists of motorized rifle troops) of the Central Military District. He was later the Deputy Commander of the 29th Combined Arms Army of the Eastern Military District. In 2012, he was promoted to major general. In 2016, he became the Chief of Staff - First Deputy Commander of the 49th Combined Arms Army of the Southern Military District.

During the Russian intervention in the Syrian civil war, Nosulev was the head of the Northern (Severnaya) army group of troops. In October 2017, by decree of the President of Russia, he was appointed commander of the 36th Combined Arms Army of the Eastern Military District within the Republic of Buryatia.

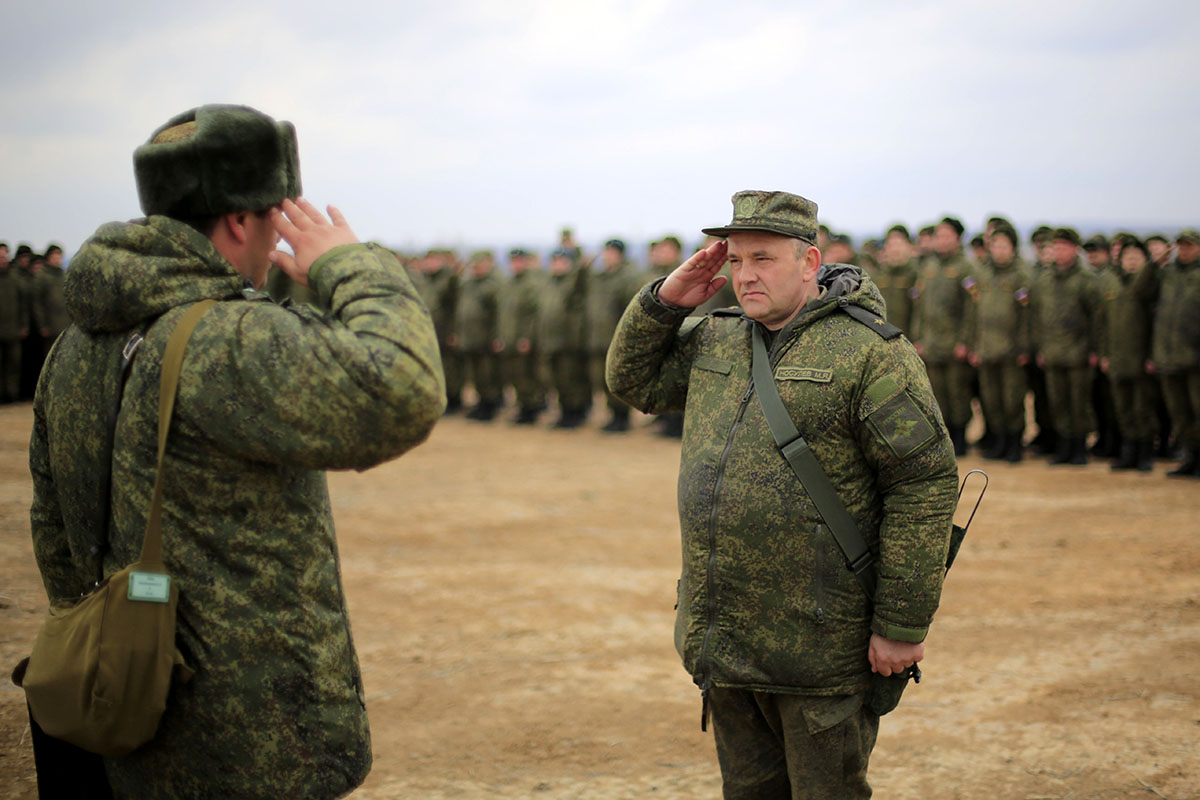
Nosulev in 26 March 2017

In 2019, Nosulev was promoted lieutenant general. In January 2020, he became the Deputy Commander of the Eastern Military District. On 6 April 2023, Nosolev became the acting commander of the Eastern Military District following Rustam Muradov's dismissal. He was replaced by his successor, Andrey Kuzmenko on 20 April. In May 2024, Nosolev left as deputy commander of the Eastern Military District.
