= 338th Brigade =

338th Brigade may refer to:

- 338th Guards Rocket Artillery Brigade, Russia/Soviet Union
- 338th Brigade, Royal Field Artillery, United Kingdom
- 338th Medical Brigade, United States

== See also ==
- 338th Regiment (disambiguation)
