= Aleksandr Sanchik =

Russian general (born 1966)

- Александр Семёнович Санчик
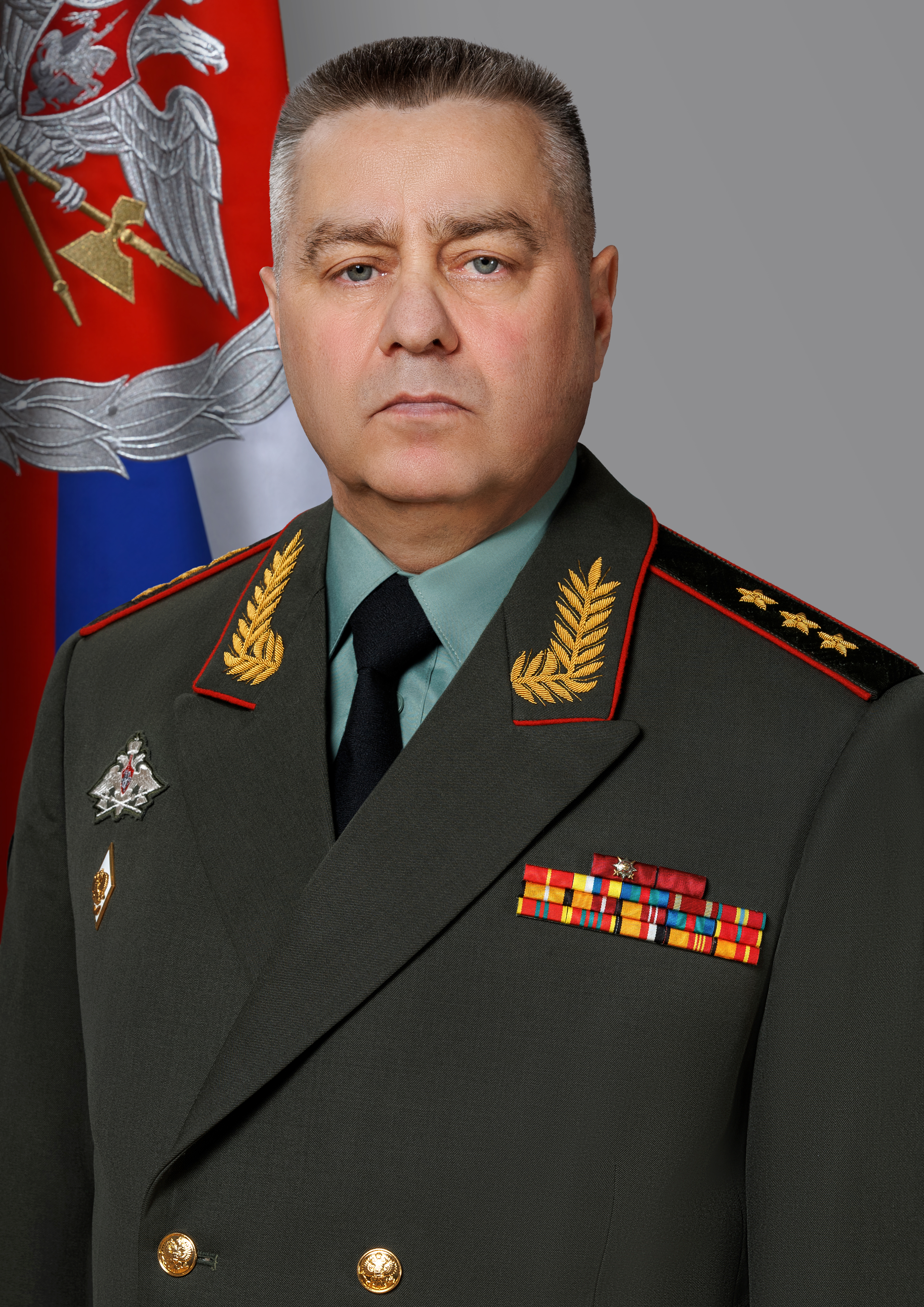
- Sanchik in 2025
- Born: Aleksandr Semyonovich Sanchik; 15 October 1966 (age 59); Moscow, Soviet Union
- Military career
- Allegiance: Soviet Union (to 1991); Russia
- Branch: Soviet Army; Russian Ground Forces
- Service years: 1989–present
- Rank: Colonel General
- Commands: Southern Military District; Eastern Military District (acting)
- Conflicts: Russo-Ukrainian war

Colonel General Aleksandr Semyonovich Sanchik (Note: Russian: Александр Семёнович Санчик) (born 15 October 1966) is a Russian military officer who is currently Deputy Minister of Defense of the Russian Federation for Logistics and director of the Logistical Support of the Russian Armed Forces since November 2025.

Sanchik had been the chief of staff and first deputy commander of the Eastern Military District in 2023. From May 2024 to November 2025, he was the acting, then de jure Commander of the Southern Military District. Due to Russia's invasion of Ukraine, he is under sanctions from the European Union, the United Kingdom, Canada and other countries.

== Military career ==
Aleksandr Sanchik was born in Moscow on 15 October 1966. From 1985 to 1989, he was a cadet of the Tashkent Higher Tank Command Order of Lenin School named after twice Hero of the Soviet Union, Marshal of Armored Forces P. S. Rybalko. In 2000, he graduated from the Combined Arms Academy of the Armed Forces of the Russian Federation.

From 2013 to 2014, Sanchik was the commander of the 27th Separate Guards Motor Rifle Brigade. From 2014 to 2015, he was the commander of the 2nd Guards Motorized Rifle Division. He served in the Russian military intervention in Syria. He held major command positions from tank platoon commander to commander of a combined arms army.

In 2015, he was a student at the Faculty of National Security and State Defense of the Military Academy of the General Staff of the Armed Forces of Russia, which he graduated two years later. In 2017, he was the deputy commander of the 58th Guards Combined Arms Army of the Southern Military District. In September 2020, he became the commander of the 35th Combined Arms Army of the Eastern Military District. In May 2023, he became the chief of staff and first deputy commander of the Eastern Military District. From May to November 2024, Sanchik was the acting commander of the Eastern Military District. In November 2024, he became the commander of the Southern Military District.

== Personal life ==
On 2 August 2022, due to Russia's invasion of Ukraine, Sanchik was included in Canada's sanctions list of "regime associates" as "involved in the unprovoked and unjustified Russian invasion of Ukraine, including the Bucha massacre".

On 13 December 2022, he came under British sanctions for being involved in missile attacks on Ukrainian cities. On 25 February 2023, he was added to the sanctions list of all EU countries for supporting and carrying out actions that undermine the territorial integrity, sovereignty and independence of Ukraine.” For similar reasons, he is under sanctions from Switzerland, Ukraine, Japan and New Zealand.

== Notes ==
Military offices
Preceded by Sergei Chebotaryov	Commander of the 35th Combined Arms Army; 2020–2023	Succeeded by Sergey Nyrkov
Preceded by Aleksey Rtishchev	Chief of Staff and First Deputy Commander of the Eastern Military District; 2023–2024	Succeeded by Andrey Kozlov
Preceded by Andrey Kuzmenko	Commander of the Eastern Military District; Acting; 2023–2024	Succeeded by Andrey Ivanayev
Preceded by Gennady Anashkin	Commander of the Southern Military District; 2024–2025	Succeeded by Sergey Medvedev
Preceded by Andrey Bulyga	Deputy Minister of Defense and Director of the Logistical Support of the Russian Armed Forces; 2025–present	Incumbent
