= JCCC =

JCCC may refer to:

- James Crabtree Correctional Center, in Helena, Alfalfa County, Oklahoma
- Jefferson City Correctional Center, in Missouri, U.S.
- Johnson County Community College, in Overland Park, Kansas, U.S.
- Joint Centre of Control and Coordination, in the Russo-Ukrainian war (2014–)
- Jon Cougar Concentration Camp, a punk rock band
- Jonsson Comprehensive Cancer Center, Los Angeles, California
