= Azatbek Omurbekov =

Russian soldier (born 1983)

Colonel Azatbek Omurbekov
- Азатбек Асанбекович Омурбеков
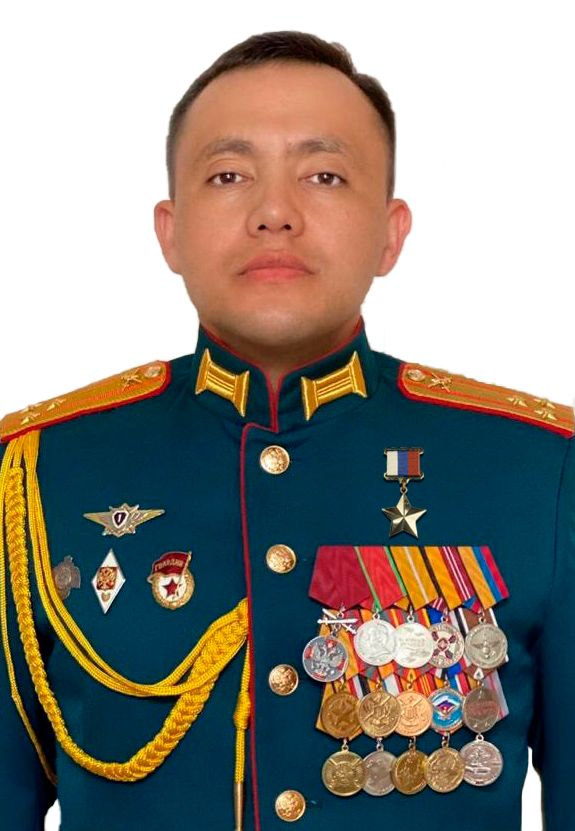
- Born: 17 September 1983 (age 43); Nukus, Karakalpakstan, Uzbek SSR, Soviet Union (now Karakalpakstan, Uzbekistan)
- Military career
- Allegiance: Russia
- Branch: Russian Ground Forces
- Rank: Colonel
- Nickname: Butcher of Bucha
- Commands: 64th Separate Guards Motor Rifle Brigade
- Conflicts: Russo-Ukrainian War; Russian invasion of Ukraine; Battle of Bucha (incl. massacre)
- Awards: Hero of Russia (condecorated for his military actions in Bucha)

Azatbek Asanbekovich Omurbekov (Note: Russian: Азатбек Асанбекович Омурбеков, romanized: Azatbek Asanbekovich Omurbekov; Karakalpak: Азатбек Асанбек уулу Өмүрбеков, romanized: Azatbek Asanbek ūlu Ömürbekov; Uzbek: Озодбек Ҳасанбек ўғли Умрбеков, Ozodbek Hasanbek oʻgʻli Umrbekov) (born 17 September 1983) is a Russian colonel who commanded the 64th Separate Motor Rifle Brigade of the Russian Ground Forces during its deployment in Ukraine, during which the unit allegedly committed war crimes in the town of Bucha. He has been referred to in some media and by the European Union as the "Butcher of Bucha".

In 2022, Omurbekov was sanctioned by the European Union, the United Kingdom, and Canada for his actions in Ukraine. The United States sanctioned the entire 64th Brigade.

== Personal life ==
Azatbek Asanbekovich Omurbekov was born on 17 September 1983. There are conflicting reports where he was born. Social media suggests he was born in Jaynak, Nukus, Karakalpakstan in the Uzbek SSR. Media reports indicate that Omurbekov was born in Soviet Uzbekistan. His grandfather, a veteran of the Eastern Front during World War II, is from Nukus, Karakalpakstan. His father, Federal Security Service (FSB) Colonel Asan Omurbekov, served in the military all his life, including guarding the Uzbek border for nearly 10 years. His brother, Askarbek Omurbekov, is reportedly lieutenant colonel in the Russian FSB.

== Russian military career ==
In 2014, Omurbekov received an award for outstanding service from then Russian deputy defense minister Dmitry Bulgakov.

In November 2021, Omurbekov reportedly received a blessing from the Russian Orthodox Church. Omurbekov and the 64th Brigade's role in Bucha were first reported by Ukrainian NGO InformNapalm.

By the time of the Russian invasion of Ukraine in February 2022, Omurbekov commanded 64th Separate Guards Motor Rifle Brigade of the 35th Combined Arms Army in the Russian Army. The unit killed, raped and tortured civilians in Bucha, Ukraine during the Bucha massacre that occurred while the city was under Russian occupation in March.

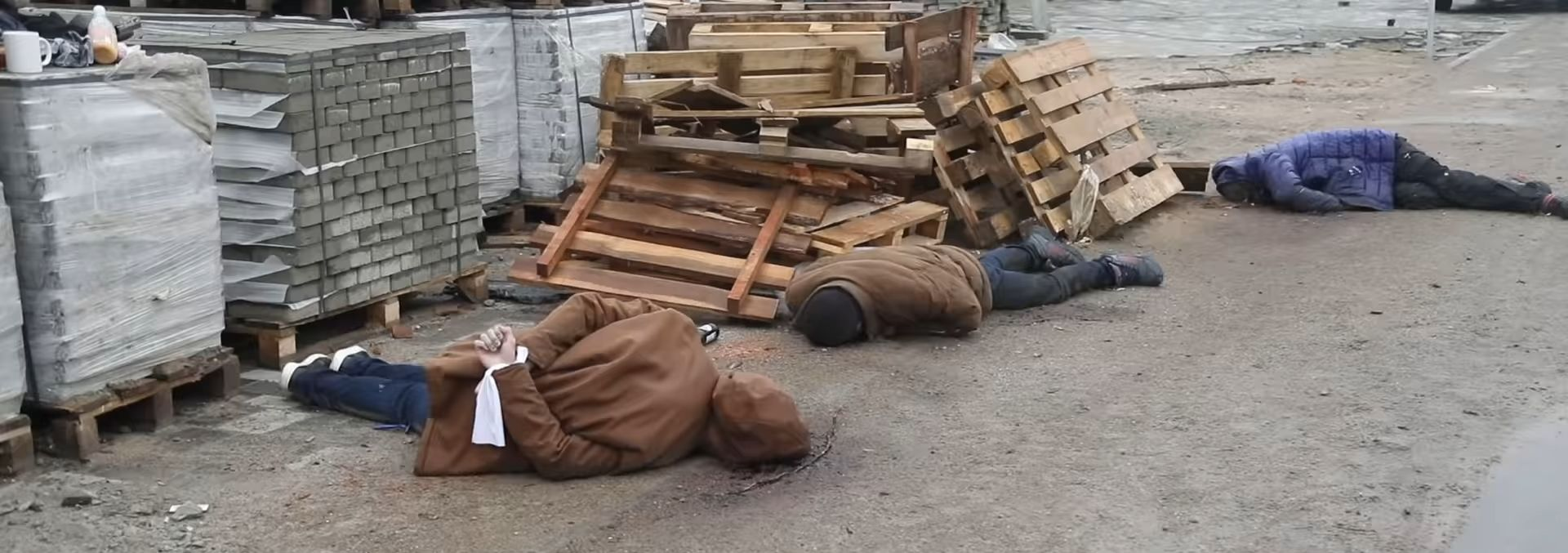
Dead civilians discovered in Bucha after the 64th Brigade under Omurbekov left the city.

By 13 July 2022, Russian President Vladimir Putin awarded him the title of Hero of the Russian Federation, Russia's highest award, in a secret ceremony. Later in 2022, he was transferred to command the 392nd District Training Centre.

On 28 April 2026, Omurbekov was targeted in an assassination attempt, targeting him at a military garrison in Khabarovsk Krai in Russia's far east. However, the assailant planted the mail bomb in the wrong mail box, and consequently a subordinate of Omurbekov was killed instead.

=== Sanctions ===
In April 2022, the United Kingdom sanctioned Omurbekov for his "involvement in the Bucha massacre". In May, Canada added Omurbekov to its sanctions list. In June, European Union sanctioned Omurbekov for his role as commander of the 64th Brigade, claiming Omurbekov had "direct responsibility in killings, rapes and torture in Bucha." The United States sanctioned the entire 64th Brigade for "killing numerous civilians, detained civilians, beat detained civilians, conducted mock executions of civilians, dismembered civilians including removing parts of their scalps and removing their limbs, burned civilians, and seized and damaged civilian homes and property" in Bucha.
