= Exercise Snap Check 2013 =

2013 Russian military exercise

Exercise Snap Check 2013 was a large Russian Military exercise in the Eastern Military District. It was third exercise of this kind in 2013 and was the largest military exercise ever held in Russia and includes units from all branches: Navy, Army and Air Force. Some 160,000 men; 130 aircraft; 5,000 vehicles including 1,000 tanks; and 70 warships from the Russian Pacific Fleet; was involved in the exercise that was set from July 13 to July 20, 2013. The exercise was ordered by Russian president Vladimir Putin on 12 July 2013, just 24 hours before its commencement.
