= 64th Separate Guards Motor Rifle Brigade =

Motorized infantry brigade of the Russian Ground Forces

64th Guards Motor Rifle Brigade (2023–present) 64th Motor Rifle Brigade (2009–2022) 882nd Motor Rifle Regiment (1967–2009)
- Sleeve patch of the brigade
- Active: 1967 – present
- Country: Soviet Union (1967–1991); Russia (1992–)
- Branch: Soviet Army (1967–1991); Russian Ground Forces (1992–)
- Type: Mechanized infantry
- Size: Brigade
- Part of: 35th Combined Arms Army
- Garrison/HQ: Knyaze-Volkonskoye; MUN 51460
- Engagements: First Chechen War; Russo-Ukrainian War; Kyiv offensive; Battle of Bucha (Massacre); 2022 Kharkiv counteroffensive
- Commander: (Acting) Lt. Colonel Vasiliy Shcherbakov; Lt. Colonel Azatbek Asanbekovich Omurbekov

The 64th Guards Motor Rifle Brigade (Military Unit Number 51460) is a motorized infantry brigade of the Russian Ground Forces. Based at Knyaze-Volkonskoye, near Khabarovsk, the brigade is part of the Eastern Military District's 35th Army. The brigade's acting commander in May 2022 was Lt. Colonel Vasiliy Shcherbakov.

The brigade was formed as the 882nd Motor Rifle Regiment, which transferred to the Far East in 1967, and which was converted into a brigade in 2009.

The brigade was among the units that perpetrated the Bucha massacre during the 2022 Russian invasion of Ukraine. After the Russian retreat from Kyiv Oblast, the brigade was elevated to a guards unit, before being redeployed to fight in the battle of Donbas in the beginning of April, attempting to advance in the Izium sector. While attempting to do so it engaged in near constant attacks, resulting in it being rendered combat ineffective by the end of June, and completely obliterated during the Kharkiv counteroffensive of September. The intensity of its combat operations was allegedly intentionally ordered, as means of eliminating the unit to cover up its war crimes.

== History ==
=== Soviet Army ===
In August 1967, the 882nd Motor Rifle Regiment of the 60th Tank Division, based at Gorky in the Moscow Military District, was transferred to a mobilization motor rifle division in the Far Eastern Military District. The regiment arrived at Knayaze-Volkonskoye and joined the 129th Motor Rifle Training Division in October 1967. At the end of 1970 it was moved to Krasnaya Rechka and became part of the 270th Motor Rifle Division in the 45th Army Corps. On 1 November 1972, the division became part of the 15th Army.

In October 1974, the regiment became a ready reaction unit. On 11 May 1980, it was reduced to a Category B strength.

=== Russian Army ===
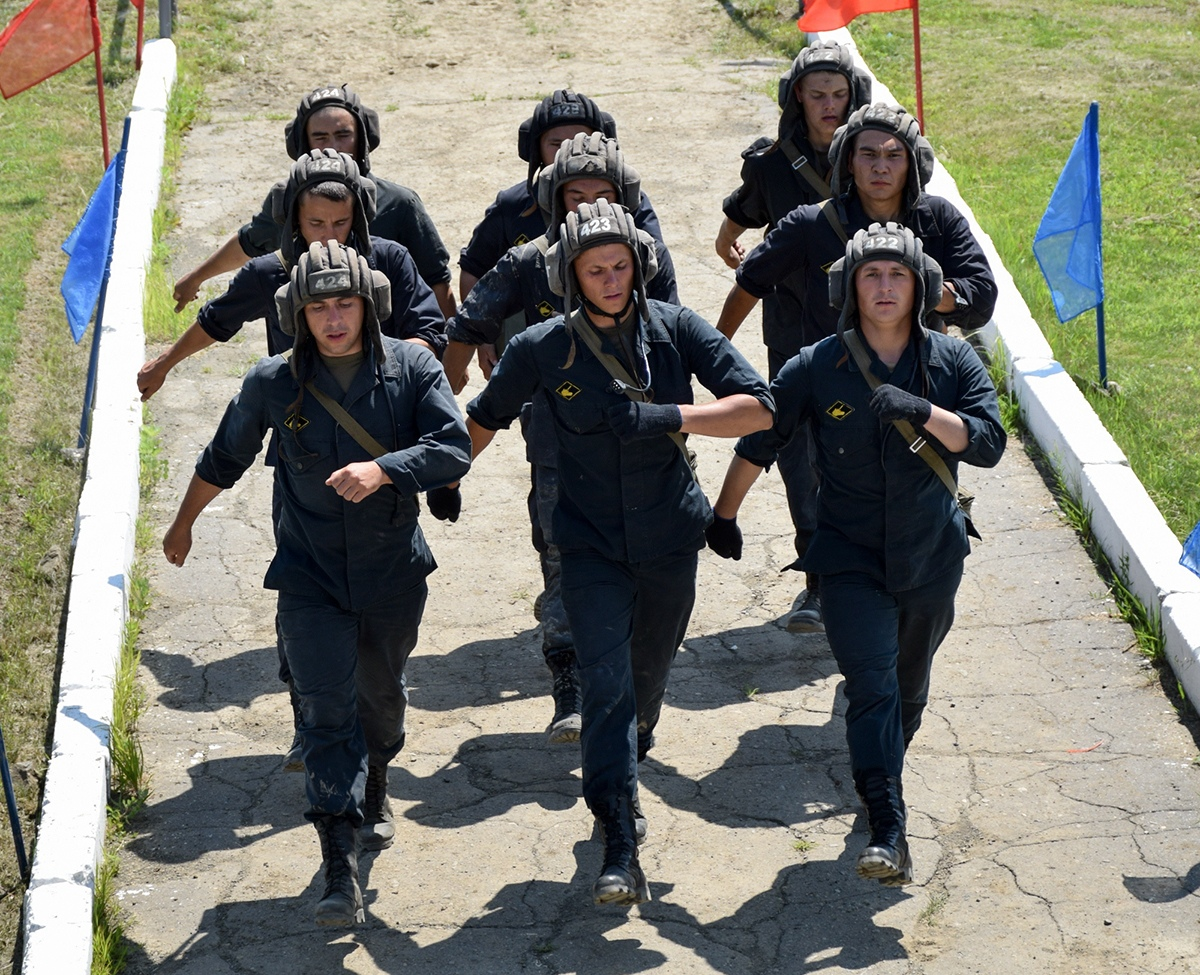
Men of the 64th Separate Guards Motor Rifle Brigade in 2019

In December 1994, it was brought up to wartime strength. Between 8 and 9 January 1995, elements of the regiment were sent to fight in the First Chechen War as part of the 245th Motor Rifle Regiment, then forming at Mulino. On 1 September 1997, the regiment was transferred to the 81st Guards Motor Rifle Division. On 6 June 1999, the regiment was directly subordinated to the headquarters of the Far Eastern Military District.

In 2001 it was withdrawn from the ready reaction force. In June of that year, the regiment became part of the 270th Motor Rifle Division, again in the 35th Army. On 1 June 2009, the regiment was converted into the 64th Separate Motor Rifle Brigade. In accordance with a 26 June 2012 directive, the brigade was relocated to Knyaze-Volkonskoye. In January 2014, a T-72 tank of the brigade exploded during target practice, killing an officer and two conscript soldiers.

==== Russian invasion of Ukraine ====
The unit was deployed northwest of Kyiv during the initial 2022 Russian invasion of Ukraine. The brigade was named by the Ukrainian Ministry of Defense as responsible for the Bucha massacre in March, where bodies were found mutilated and burnt, and girls as young as fourteen reported being raped. Ukraine's Ministry of Defense stated that it knew the names and other personal information of several soldiers tied to the brigade.

Shortly afterward, on 18 April 2022, the brigade received the honorary guards status from Russian president Vladimir Putin and became known as the 64th Separate Guards Motor Rifle Brigade.

After the Russian retreat from Kyiv Oblast, the brigade was rushed to redeploy and participate in the battle of Donbas. In April, the brigade was reported to have been engaged by Ukrainian forces at Izium, and taken losses there. In June, Ukraine claimed to have destroyed almost all of the 35th Combined Arms Army there. According to Ukraine, Russians published photos of their dead soldiers from the brigade.

Citing a report from Radio Free Europe/Radio Liberty, the Institute for the Study of War concluded that the brigade had likely been destroyed as "part of an intentional Kremlin effort to conceal war crimes it committed in Kyiv Oblast." The report went further stating that of the 1,500 members of the brigade, losses were estimated at 200–300 killed and as much as 700–1,050 wounded during fighting at Izium and Sloviansk, and that the unit "largely ceased to exist." The unit was then directly hit by the main Ukrainian thrust during the Kharkiv counteroffensive, and afterwards ceased to be mentioned in the Russian order of battle again, corroborating reports by the Ukrainians that the Brigade's remnants had suffered 90% casualties during the offensive, with only a few dozen managing to escape encirclement and subsequent destruction.

In May 2026, a reconstituted 64th Brigade was hit by drones belonging to the Unmanned Systems Forces of Ukraine in the training ground at Trokhizbenka.
