= 265th Motor Rifle Division =

Motor rifle division of the Soviet military

265th Motor Rifle Division (1965–1989) 119th Motor Rifle Division (1957–1965) 71st Mechanized Division (1953–1957) 34th Separate Rifle Brigade (1946–1953) 265th Rifle Division (1941–1946)
- Active: July 1941–October 1989
- Country: Soviet Union
- Branch: Red Army
- Type: Rifle division
- Engagements: World War II
- Battle honours: Vyborg

The 265th Motor Rifle Division (Russian: 265-я мотострелковая дивизия) was a motorized infantry division of the Soviet Army during the Cold War.

The division traced its heritage back to the 265th Rifle Division, which was formed in mid-1941 from an NKVD division. The 265th fought in the Continuation War and the siege of Leningrad through 1944 and the Battle of Berlin in 1945. Postwar, it was withdrawn to the Soviet Union and downsized into a rifle brigade before being expanded into the 71st Mechanized Division in 1953. It was relocated to Vilnius and converted into the 119th Motor Rifle Division in 1957 before relocating to the Soviet Far East in 1964 and being renumbered as the 265th Motor Rifle Division. It spent the rest of its career in the Far East and was downsized into a storage base in 1989.

== History ==
=== World War II ===
The 265th Rifle Division began forming on 26 June 1941 in the Moscow Military District as the 17th NKVD Mountain Division. It was one of the fifteen NKVD divisions that began forming on 26 June and was transferred to the Red Army in early July. The 265th, whose major subunits included the 450th, 941st, and 951st Rifle Regiments, the 798th Artillery Regiment, and the 224th Anti-Tank Battalion, remained in the Moscow Military District at least until 10 July, and later that month moved to Leningrad with a 1500-man cadre of NKVD personnel. In early August it joined the 23rd Army, fighting in the Continuation War north of Leningrad on the Karelian Isthmus. On 26 August, its first Red Army commander, Major Ivan Prytkov, was assigned to the division.

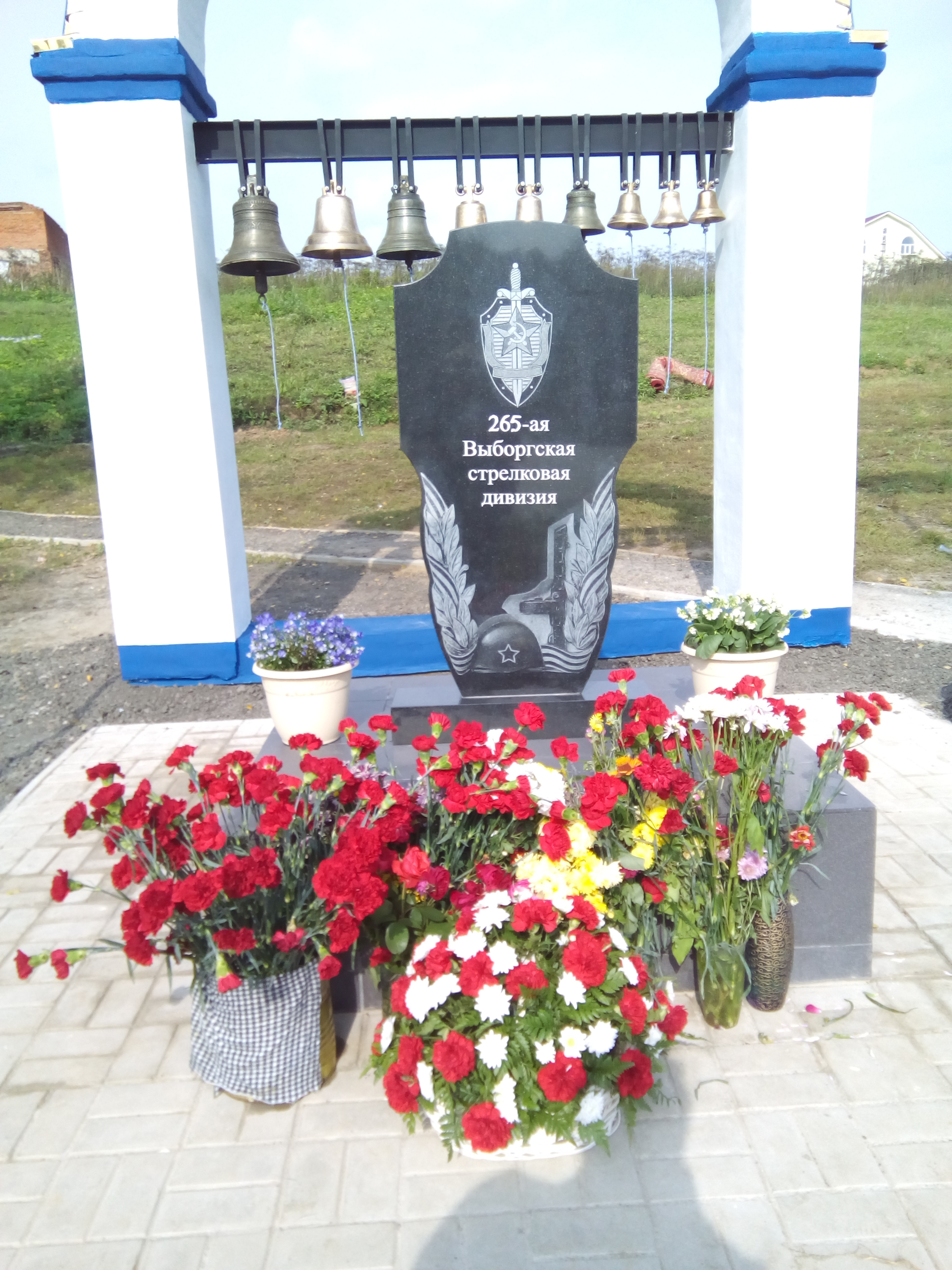
A memorial to the 265th Rifle Division in the village of Sofrino on the Karelian Isthmus

On 14 October, the division was transferred to the Neva River front, south of the city. In November it became part of the 8th Army, which was part of the Volkhov Front from early 1942. In November 1943, the 265th was withdrawn to the Reserve of the Supreme High Command and from February 1944 was either part of the Leningrad Front or the 3rd Baltic Front until the end of 1944. Between June and July, it was part of the 21st Army's 110th Rifle Corps for the Svir–Petrozavodsk Offensive on the Karelian Isthmus, which eventually forced Finland out of the war. In August the 265th became part of the 3rd Baltic Front reserves, and in October it was with the 3rd Shock Army's 7th Rifle Corps in the 2nd Baltic Front. Just before the Vistula–Oder Offensive began in January 1945, the division transferred to the 1st Belorussian Front. It fought in the advance through Poland and in the Battle of Berlin in April and May 1945. During the war, the division was awarded the honorific "Vyborg".

=== Postwar ===
As of 1 December 1945, the division was still with the 3rd Shock Army's 7th Rifle Corps in eastern Germany, part of the Group of Soviet Forces in Germany. On 6 June 1946, the 265th was withdrawn to the Moscow Military District with the 7th Rifle Corps, which was disbanded. The 265th further relocated to Shuya in the Gorky Military District as part of the 1st Guards Rifle Corps, where it became the 34th Separate Rifle Brigade. In October 1953, it was expanded into the 71st Mechanized Division. By the beginning of August 1956, the 71st was relocated from Ivanovo to Vilnius, and on 5 June 1957 was converted into the 119th Motor Rifle Division, part of the 10th Army Corps (formerly the 10th Rifle Corps) in the Baltic Military District. Beginning on 11 July 1964, the division was relocated from Vilnius to the Amur Oblast. It was replaced at Vilnius by the 107th Motor Rifle Division.

On 11 January 1965, the division was renumbered as the 265th Motor Rifle Division. In the Far East, the division was stationed at Vozzhayevka (near Belogorsk), and became part of the 35th Army from 1969. In the late 1980s, the division's 421st Motor Rifle Regiment was based at Pozdeyevka, the 373rd Tank Regiment and division headquarters at Vozzhayevka, the 695th Motor Rifle Regiment and 798th Artillery Regiment at Srednebelaya, and the 212th Motor Rifle Regiment at Cheremkhovo. On 25 October 1989, it was downsized into the 5507th Weapons and Equipment Storage Base.

== Commanders ==
The following officers commanded the division during World War II:

- Major Ivan Prytkov (26 August–22 October 1941)
- Major General Georgy Bukhovets (23 October–7 December 1941)
- Colonel Yakov Yermakov (8 December 1941 – 25 June 1942)
- Colonel Boris Ushinsky (26 June 1942)
- Colonel Yevgeny Pereverzev (27 June–12 August 1942)
- Colonel Boris Ushinsky (14 August 1942 – 23 February 1944)
- Colonel Fyodor Andreyev (24 February–27 September 1944)
- Major General Daniil Krasilnikov (28 September 1944–after 9 May 1945)
