= 69th Covering Brigade =

69th Covering Brigade (2009–present) 128th Machine-Gun Artillery Division (1989–1993; 1997–2009) 173rd Mobile Fortress Brigade (1993–1997) 272nd Motor Rifle Division (1964–1989) 46th Motor Rifle Division (1957–1964) 46th Rifle Division (1955–1957) 50th Rifle Brigade (1947–1953) 272nd Rifle Division (1941–1947; 1953–1955)
- Active: July 1941 – present
- Country: Soviet Union
- Branch: Red Army
- Type: Fortress brigade
- Part of: 35th Army
- Garrison/HQ: Babstovo
- Engagements: World War II
- Decorations: Order of the Red Banner; Order of the Red Star
- Battle honours: Svir; Pomeranian; Amur Cossacks

Commanders
- Notable commanders: Vasily Meshkov

The 69th Covering Brigade (Russian: 69-я отдельная бригада прикрытия, romanized: 69-ya otdelnaya brigada prikrytiya) is a unique border protection brigade of the Russian Ground Forces, stationed at Babstovo, Jewish Autonomous Oblast, and part of the 35th Army. Military Unit в/ч 61424.

The brigade traces its heritage back to the 272nd Rifle Division, which was first formed in the summer of 1941 and fought in the Continuation War with Finland north of Leningrad on the Karelian Isthmus. After Finland left the war in September 1944, the division was sent to the front again in January 1945, fighting in the East Pomeranian Offensive. Postwar, the division was relocated to Kursk, where it became a rifle brigade in 1947. Upgraded into the 272nd Division again in 1953, it was renumbered the 46th Rifle Division in 1955, became a motor rifle division in 1957, and was restored to its original World War II number in 1964. As a result of the Sino-Soviet split, the division was relocated to Babstovo in the Far East in 1967. In 1989, the division became the 128th Machine-Gun Artillery Division but was downsized into the 173rd Mobile Fortress Brigade in 1993. Converted back into the 128th Machine-Gun Artillery Division in 1997, the brigade assumed its current name in 2009 as a result of the 2008 Russian military reform.

== History ==
=== World War II ===
The 272nd began forming on 10 July 1941 at Tikhvin, part of the Leningrad Military District. Its basic order of battle included the 1061st, 1063rd, and the 1065th Rifle Regiments, as well as the 815th Artillery Regiment. The division was almost immediately sent to Petrozavodsk in Karelia, and was assigned to the 7th Army on 31 July. The division fought in battles against Finnish troops north of Leningrad, part of the Continuation War. During the Svir-Petrozavodsk Offensive in summer 1944, which forced Finland to leave the war, the 272nd fought as part of the 4th Rifle Corps. After Finland left the war by signing an armistice in September, the division became part of the 32nd Army's 134th Rifle Corps in the Reserve of the Supreme High Command. It returned to the front in January 1945 as part of the 19th Army in East Prussia. The division fought there until the end of the war, ending the war with the 2nd Shock Army's 40th Guards Rifle Corps.

=== Postwar ===
The division received the honorifics "Svir-Pomeranian Red Banner" for its actions. On 29 May 1945, the 272nd and its corps, as part of the 2nd Shock Army, became part of the Group of Soviet Occupation Forces in Germany.In August, the division was withdrawn to Kursk as part of the 96th Rifle Corps in the Voronezh Military District. In the spring of 1947, the 272nd was downsized into the 50th Separate Rifle Brigade, but became a division again in October 1953. On 30 April 1955 it was renumbered the 46th Rifle Division while part of the 13th Guards Rifle Corps. On 25 June 1957, it became the 46th Motor Rifle Division. At the same time it became part of the Moscow Military District, and on 17 November 1964 was renumbered as the 272nd Motor Rifle Division, restoring its World War II designation.

In February 1967, the division was relocated to Babstovo, Jewish Autonomous Oblast, as a result of rising tensions with China. The 272nd left the 153rd Motor Rifle Regiment behind at Kursk to provide a cadre for the replacement 245th Motor Rifle Division, and it was replaced by the new 695th Motor Rifle Regiment. At Babstovo, close to the Chinese border, the 272nd joined the 2nd Army Corps, but in May 1969 transferred to the 43rd Army Corps. In 1969, the 695th Motor Rifle Regiment transferred to the 265th Motor Rifle Division and was replaced by the 265th's 424th Motor Rifle Regiment, and the 155th Motor Rifle Regiment transferred to the 266th Motor Rifle Division, and was replaced by the 266th's 209th Motor Rifle Regiment. During the Cold War, the division was maintained at 30% strength as a Cadre High Strength division. On 27 July 1989, the 272nd was converted into the 128th Machine-Gun Artillery Division. At the same time, the 209th Regiment was disbanded, and was replaced by the 63rd Machine-Gun Artillery Regiment, formed from the 3rd Fortified Area. In October 1989, the division transferred to the 35th Army. The 159th Motor Rifle Regiment was disbanded in 1990, and in 1991 the 1192nd Anti-Aircraft Rocket Regiment was disbanded, and replaced by the 1092nd Anti-Aircraft Rocket Regiment.

=== Service in the Russian Ground Forces ===
On 4 February 1993, the division was converted into the 173rd Mobile Covering Brigade. In December, the 155th Motor Rifle Regiment was split into the separate mobile battalions: the 229th, 231st, and 308th. On 12 May 1997, the brigade became the 128th Machine-Gun Artillery Division again. On 1 June 2009, the division was downsized into a brigade as part of the 2008 Russian military reform. The 69th Covering Brigade's mission is to provide protection for the Chinese border of the Jewish Autonomous Oblast. At some point after 2009, it received the honorific "Amur Cossack." In January 2017, its commander, Colonel Marat Gadzhibalayev, was sentenced to four years in a general regime Corrective labor colony on charges of abusing his powers, forgery, and taking bribes.

There are indications that the brigade has been committed to action as part of the Russian invasion of Ukraine.
