= Konstantin Sidenko =

Konstantin Semyonovich Sidenko
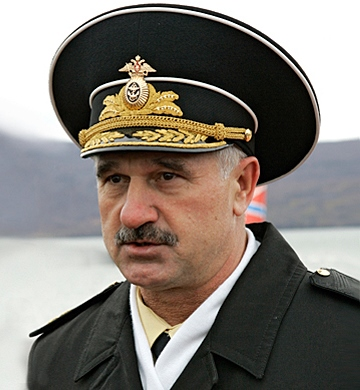
- Konstantin Sidenko in 2011
- Native name: Константин Семёнович Сиденко
- Born: 2 February 1953 (age 73); Khabarovsk, Soviet Union
- Allegiance: Soviet Union, Russia
- Branch: Soviet Navy, Russian Navy
- Service years: 1989-2013
- Rank: Fleet Admiral
- Commands: Russian Pacific Fleet, Russian Navy
- Awards: Order of Military Merit; Order for Service to the Homeland in the Armed Forces of the USSR, 3rd class

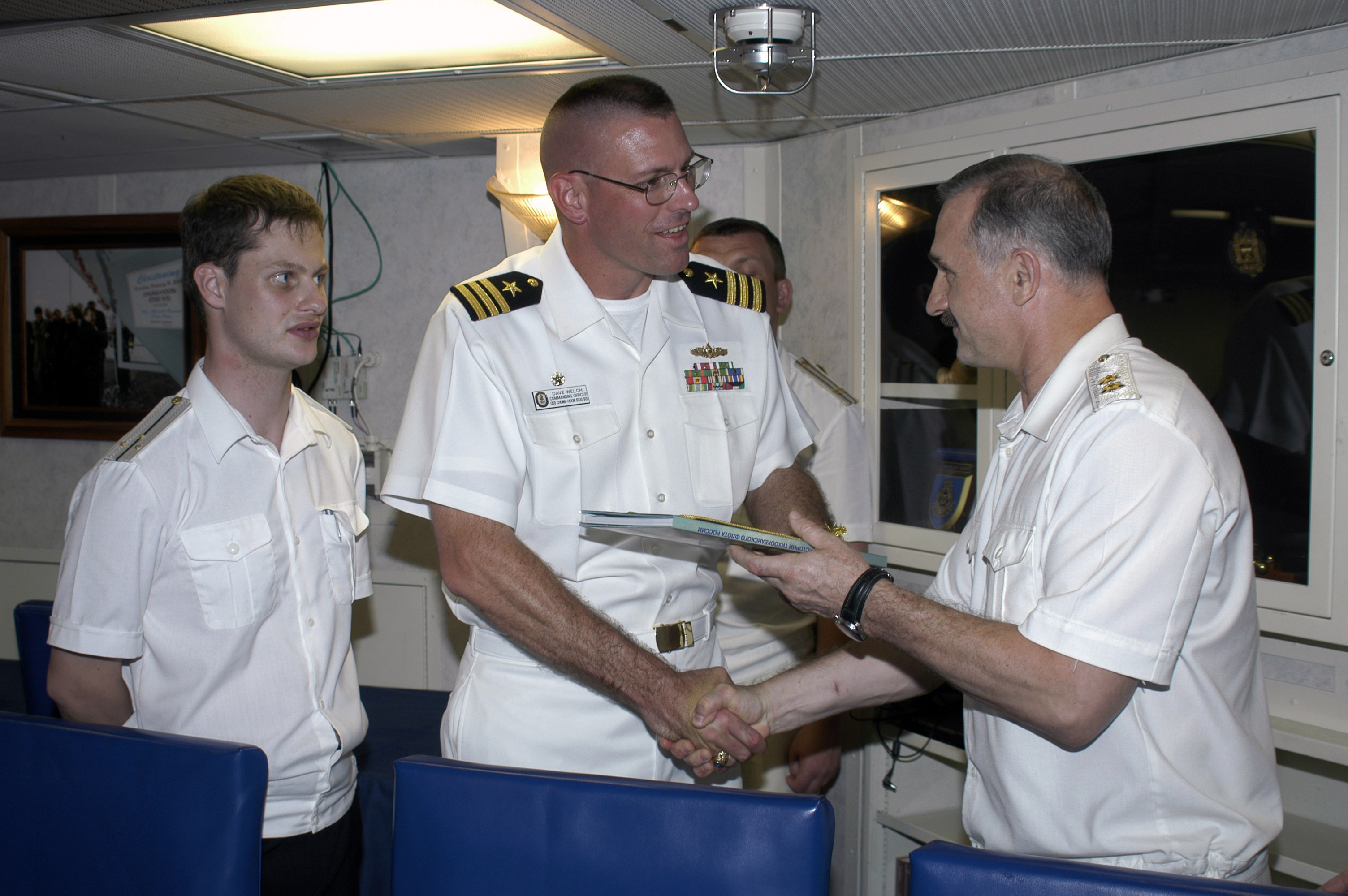
Konstantin Sidenko (right) visits aboard USS Chung-Hoon (DDG-93) in 2006

Konstantin Semyonovich Sidenko (Russian: Константин Семёнович Сиденко; born 2 February 1953) is a Russian admiral and a recipient of Order of Military Merit and Order for Service to the Homeland in the Armed Forces of the USSR.

== Biography ==
Sidenko was born on 2 February 1953 in Khabarovsk. He became a student at the Pacific Higher Naval School in 1970 and graduated from Pacific Higher Naval School which was honourably named after S.O. Makarov in 1975. Later on, in 1989, he graduated from the Naval Academy after which he served with the Pacific Fleet as deputy commander in charge of submarines. Five years later he graduated from the Russian Military Academy of the General Staff and became chief of staff for both a submarine flotilla and of a squadron. He continued with that position through June 2000 when he became commander of the North-Eastern Troops and Forces. In April 2002 Sidenko became first deputy commander of the Pacific Fleet itself and in May 2006 became commander of the Baltic Fleet. In December 2007 he was promoted to the commander of the Pacific Fleet and in July 2010 became commander-in-chief of the Eastern Military District. As of 29 December 2010 under a Decree of the Russian President Sidenko was appointed as commander at the same place.

He graduated from the Makarov Pacific Higher Naval School (1970–1975), the Higher Special Officer Classes of the Soviet Navy (1982–1983), the Marshal Grechko Naval Academy (1987–1989), and the General Staff Academy (1992–1994).

He served within a ship's operations department (BCh-3) (1975–1981), senior assistant to the submarine commander (1981–1982), the submarine crew commander, submarine commander(1983–1987), deputy commander (1989–1992), commander (1994–1996) 45th submarine flotilla. During his command of the 45th Submarine flotilla, he was promoted to kontr-admiral (one star) (5 May 1995). His next post was chief of staff of the 2nd Submarine squadron (November 1996 - May 1998), Chief of Staff of the 16th submarine task group (May 1998 - August 1999), chief of staff (August 1999 - June 2000), Commander (June 2000 - December 2001) Northeastern Group of Troops and Forces. During his command of the NEGTF, he was promoted to vitze-admiral (two stars) (9 June 2001. Chief of Staff of the Pacific Fleet (5 December 2001 - 6 May 2006), commander of the Baltic Fleet (6 May 2006 - 6 December 2007) Commander Pacific Fleet (6 December 2007 - 29 October 2010). He was promoted to Vice-Admiral on 12 June 2010.

On 29 October 2010, he was named the first deputy commander of the Eastern Military District. He was promoted to Admiral soon after.
