= 4th Rocket Brigade =

- Active: 1961-1997
- Country: Soviet Union (1961-1991); Russia (1992-1997)
- Branch: Soviet Army (1961-1991); Russian Ground Forces (1992-1997)
- Type: Tactical Ballistic Missile Brigade
- Garrison/HQ: Razdolny
- Decorations: Order of Lenin; Order of the Red Banner
- Battle honours: Mozyr

The 4th Rocket Brigade was a Tactical ballistic missile brigade of the Soviet Army and the Russian Ground Forces from 1961 to 1997. From 1963 it was based in Primorsky Krai with the 5th Red Banner Army.

== History ==
The 4th Missile Brigade was activated in July 1961 in Krasnodar, part of the North Caucasus Military District. The unit inherited the honorific "Mozyr", as well as the Order of Lenin and the Order of the Red Banner from the predecessor 6th Breakthrough Artillery Division. The brigade included three separate missile battalions, one of which was the 470th Separate Missile Battalion, as well as a technical battery. It was equipped with R-11 Zemlya (SS-1B Scud A) tactical ballistic missiles. In December 1963, the brigade transferred to Razdolny in Primorsky Krai and became part of the 5th Red Banner Army. The brigade was disbanded on 1 September 1997. Its honorifics were transferred to the 23rd Rocket Brigade, which became the 107th Rocket Brigade.
