= Vladimir Toporov (military officer) =

Soviet and Russian general (born 1946)

- Native name: Владимир Топоров
- Born: 7 February 1946 (age 80)
- Allegiance: Soviet Union (to 1991); Russia
- Branch: Soviet Airborne Forces; Russian Airborne Forces
- Service years: 1965–2006
- Rank: General of the Army
- Commands: Moscow Military District; 35th Combined Arms Army; 7th Guards Airborne Division
- Alma mater: Odessa Higher Artillery Command School; Frunze Military Academy; Voroshilov General Staff Academy

General of the Army Vladimir Mikhailovich Toporov (Note: Russian: Владимир Михайлович Топоров) (born February 7, 1946) is a Russian retired military officer. He served as commander of the Moscow Military District from 1991 to 1992, Deputy Minister of Defense of the Russian Federation from 1992 to 2002. His previous commands included the 35th Combined Arms Army and the 7th Guards Airborne Division.

== Biography ==
He was born in the city of Baranavichy, Baranavichy district, Byelorussian SSR. In 1965 he was conscripted to the Soviet Armed Forces. He graduated from the Odessa Higher Artillery Command School (1965-1968), the Frunze Military Academy (1972-1975), the Voroshilov Military Academy of the General Staff of the Armed Forces of the USSR (1982-1984).

He served in the Soviet Airborne Forces as an anti-tank gun platoon commander, and from 1969 as an ATGM battery commander in the Far East. From 1975 he served as deputy commander of the parachute regiment and from 1977 as commander of the parachute regiment. From 1979 he served as deputy commander, and from 1984 he served as commander of the 7th Guards Airborne Division in the Lithuanian SSR.

From January 1987 he served as first deputy commander, from February 1988 he served as commander of the 35th Combined Arms Army of the Far Eastern Military District. From August 1989 he served as chief of staff and first deputy commander of the Far Eastern Military District. From August 1991 he served as commander of the Moscow Military District. On 24 October 1991 he was appointed to the military rank of Colonel General.

In accordance with the decree of the President of Russia of June 10, 1992, he was appointed Deputy Minister of Defense of the Russian Federation. He held this position under four defense ministers for 10 years, thereby setting an absolute record for tenure in the highest posts in the Russian Defense Ministry during the 1990s. He supervised the combat training of troops and the Russian Ground Forces. Toporov was rarely mentioned even in the pages of the departmental military press, not to mention the civilian media. The latter only covered his visit to Moldova at the head of the Russian military delegation and his speech in the State Duma in 1998 with a report on the state of affairs in the Russian army. On 22 of February 1996 in accordance with decree of the president of Russia, he was awarded the military rank of General of the Army.

He became involved in a major corruption scandal in 1997: according to reports from a number of Russian newspapers, he purchased three prestigious apartments in Moscow on Rublevskoye Highway at the expense of the Russian Ministry of Defense, registering them in his, his father's, and his sister's names, respectively. The results of the investigation were not reported.

In 2002, he was relieved of his post and sent to the disposal of the Minister of Defense of the Russian Federation. In 2006, he was discharged from the army upon reaching the maximum age for military service. He lives in Moscow.

== Awards ==
- Order of Military Merit
- Order of the Red Banner of Labour
- Order "For Service to the Homeland in the Armed Forces of the USSR"
- Jubilee Medal "In Commemoration of the 100th Anniversary of the Birth of Vladimir Ilyich Lenin"
- Medal "Veteran of the Armed Forces of the USSR"
- Jubilee Medal "50 Years of the Armed Forces of the USSR"
- Jubilee Medal "60 Years of the Armed Forces of the USSR"
- Jubilee Medal "70 Years of the Armed Forces of the USSR"
- Medal "For Impeccable Service"
- Medal "200 years to the Ministry of Defense
