= Eastern Military District =

Military district of Russia

- Восточный военный округ
- Emblem of the Eastern Military District
- Founded: 21 October 2010
- Country: Russia
- Branch: Russian Ground Forces
- Type: Military district
- Part of: Ministry of Defence
- Headquarters: Ulitsa Serysheva 15, Khabarovsk
- Engagements: Russo-Ukrainian War; Invasion of Ukraine
- Decorations: Order of the Red Banner (2); Order of Lenin; Order of Suvorov
- Website: Official website

Commanders
- Current commander: Colonel General Pyotr Bolgarev

Insignia
- Flag

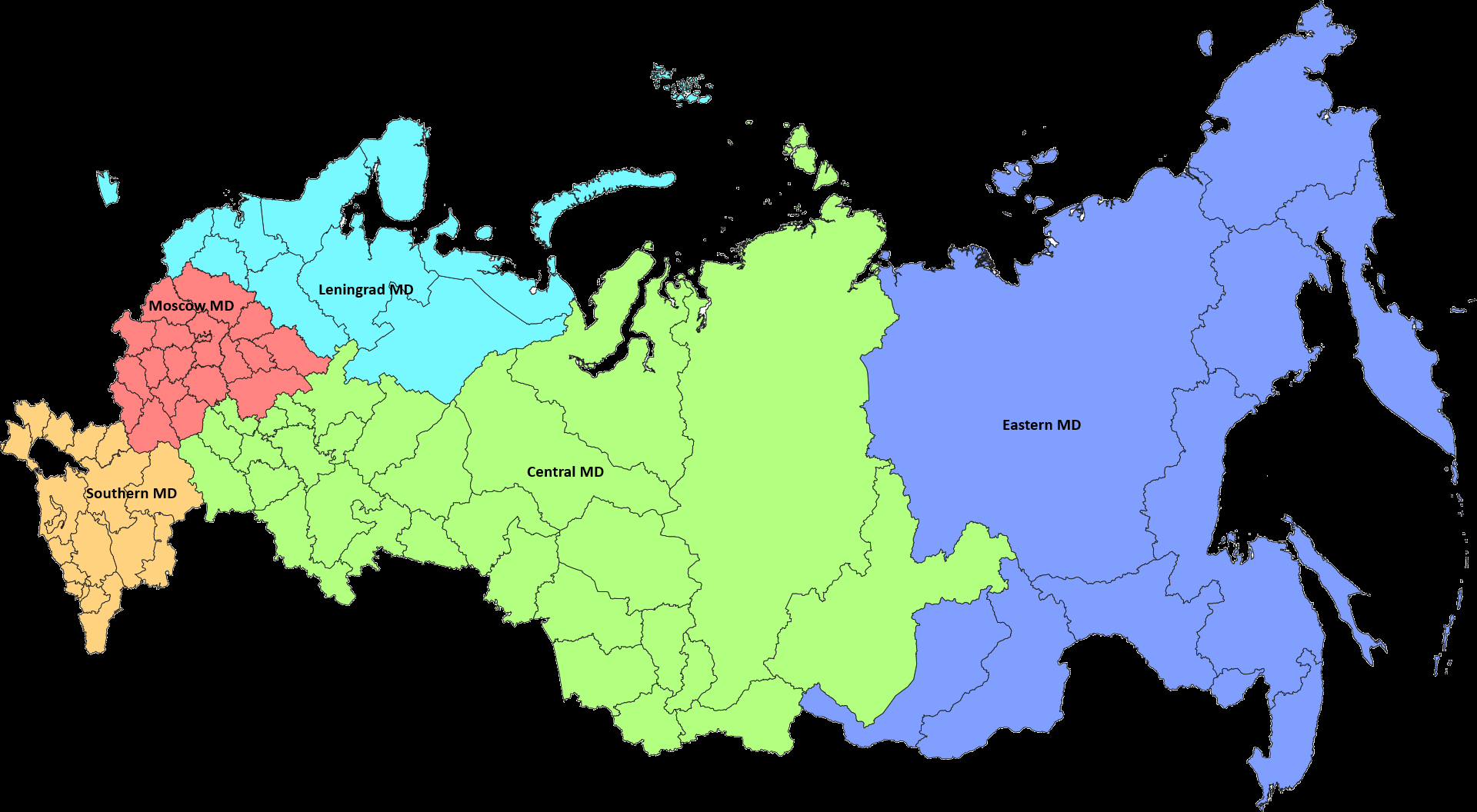
The Eastern Military District, shown in blue, on a map of the five Russian military districts.

The Order of the Red Banner Eastern Military District (Russian: Восточный военный округ) is a military district of Russia.

It is one of the five military districts of the Russian Armed Forces, with its jurisdiction within the Far Eastern Federal District of the country. The Eastern Military District was created as part of the 2008 military reforms, and founded by Presidential Decree №1144 signed on September 20, 2010, to replace the Far East Military District with the addition of the Transbaikal section of the Siberian Military District. The district began operation on October 21, 2010, under the command of Admiral Konstantin Sidenko.

The Eastern Military District is the second largest military district in Russia by geographic size at 7,000,000 square kilometers (2,700,000 sq mi). The district contains 11 federal subjects of Russia: Amur Oblast, Buryatia, Chukotka Autonomous Okrug, Jewish Autonomous Oblast, Kamchatka Krai, Khabarovsk Krai, Magadan Oblast, Primorsky Krai, Sakha Republic, Sakhalin Oblast, Zabaykalsky Krai.

The district commander may direct all the formations of the Armed Forces within the district's territory, with the exception of the Strategic Rocket Forces and Russian Aerospace Forces. In addition, operational subordination of the formations of the National Guard Troops, the Border Service of the FSB, as well as units of the Ministry of Emergency Situations and other ministries and departments performing tasks in the district.

The Eastern Military District is headquartered in Khabarovsk, and its current district commander is Colonel General Pyotr Bolgarev, who has held the position since August 2026.

== History ==
31 July 1918 is considered to be the date of foundation of the predecessor Far Eastern Military District. On this day, regular units of the Red Army defeated the White Army of the White Guards and interventionists in the area of the Kaul Heights, Shmakovka and Spassk. This date is widely celebrated by the military personnel of the Eastern Military District.

On 22 February 2018, at the National Defense Management Center awarded the Eastern Military District a banner as symbols of honor, valor and military glory.

From 11 to 17 September 2018, the Vostok 2018 military exercise took place in the district.

By the end of January 2022, the headquarters of the Eastern Military District reportedly deployed to Belarus as part of the prelude to the Russian invasion of Ukraine. Combat units drawn from the district's 5th Combined Arms Army, 29th Combined Arms Army, 35th Combined Arms Army, 36th Combined Arms Army, 68th Army Corps and the Pacific Fleet's 155th Naval Infantry Brigade were also reported to have deployed to Belarus.

== Component units ==
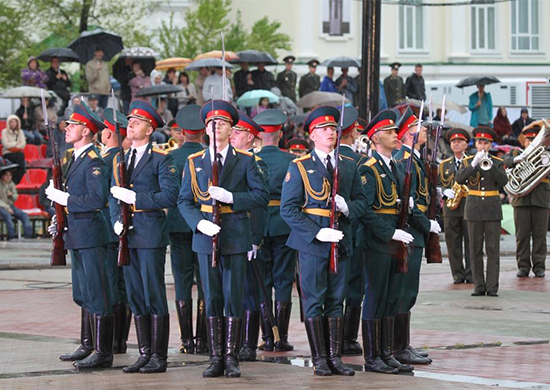
The Khabarovsk Honour Guard.

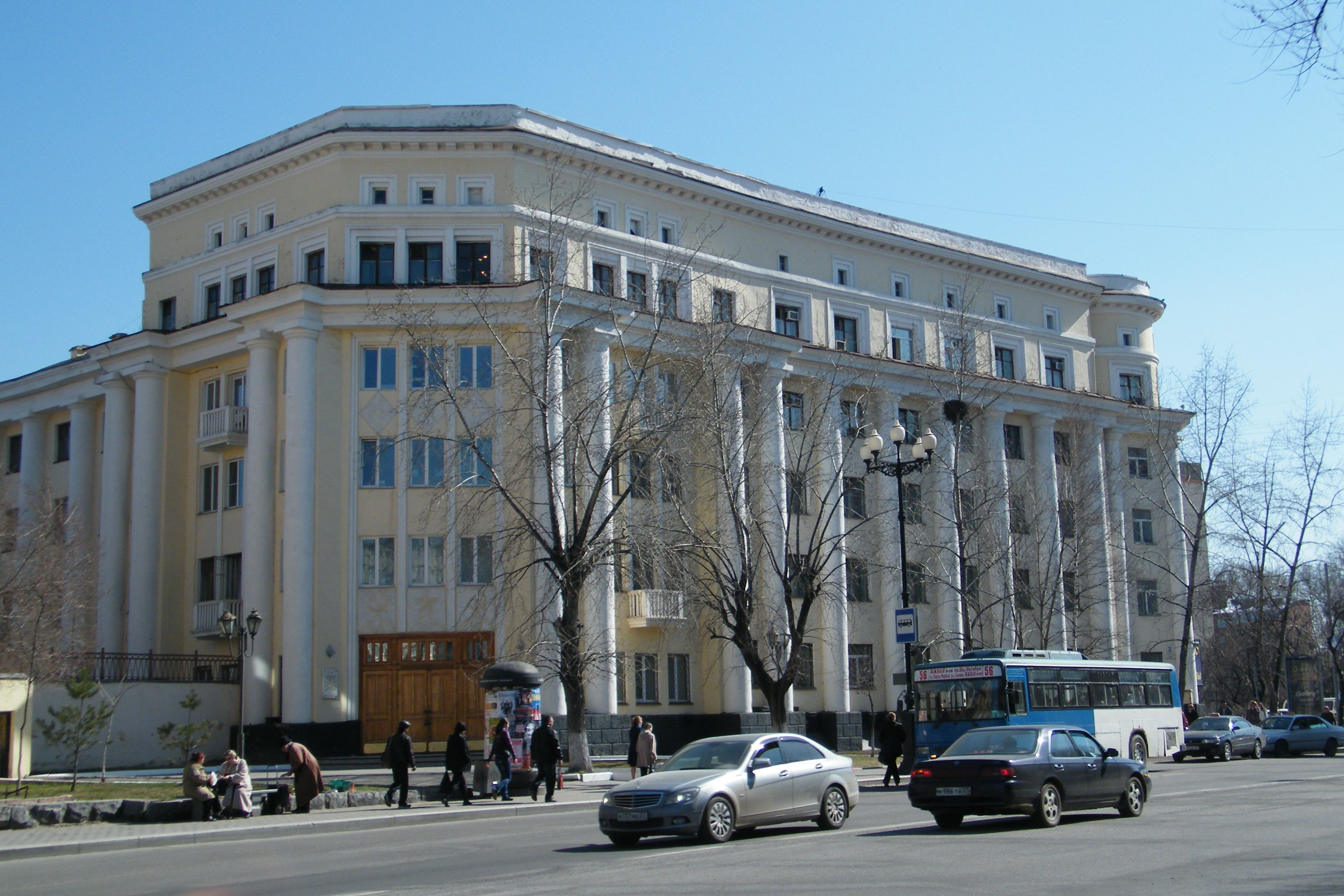
District Headquarters, 2013

This listing of formation and units is not complete. A Command, control, and communications (C3) brigade is synonymous with a headquarters brigade.

- 104th Cluj Headquarters Brigade (Khabarovsk)
- Honour Guard Company of the Khabarovsk Garrison (formed 14 December 1971 and is led by Lieutenant Colonel Dmitri Zielinski)
- 106th Communications Brigade (Territorial) (Dalnerechensk)
- 14th Separate Guards Baranovichi Red Banner Order of the Red Star Engineering Brigade (Vyatka, Khabarovsk Krai)
- 17th Separate Electronic Warfare Brigade (Khabarovsk)
- 7th Separate Red Banner Railway Brigade (Komsomolsk-on-Amur)
- 50th Separate Railway Brigade (Svobodny)
- 118th Separate Pontoon-Bridge Railway Battalion (Khabarovsk)
- 392nd District Training Center for Junior Specialists (Motor Rifle Troops) (Khabarovsk)
- 212th Guards Vienna Orders of Lenin and Kutuzov District Training Center for Junior Specialists (Tank Troops) (Chita)
- 51st Training Detachment of the Pacific Fleet (Vladivostok)
- 7th Regional Training Center for NCOs (Knyaz-Volkonskoye, Khabarovsk Krai)
- 338th Guards MRL Brigade (Novosysoevka) (rocket artillery; BM-27 Uragan)

29th Army (Chita)

- 101st Khingan Headquarters Brigade (Chita)
- 36th Separate Guards Motor Rifle Brigade (Borzya)
- 200th Artillery Brigade (Gorny)
- 140th Anti-Aircraft Rocket Brigade (Domna, Zabaykalsky Krai)

5th Combined Arms Army (Ussuriysk)

- 57th Motor Rifle Brigade (Bikin)
- 127th Motor Rifle Division
- 60th Motor Rifle Brigade (Sibirtsevo and Lipovtsy)
- 20th Guards Rocket Brigade (Spassk-Dalny)
- 305th Artillery Brigade (Ussuriysk)
- 8th Anti-Aircraft Rocket Brigade (Razdolnoye, Primorsky Krai)
- 80th C3 Brigade (Ussuriysk)
- 16th Separate NBC Defence Brigade (Lesozavodsk)

68th Army Corps (Yuzhno-Sakhalinsk)

- 137th Separate Headquarters Battalion (Yuzhno-Sakhalinsk)
- 39th Separate Motor Rifle Brigade (Khomutovo)
- 312th Separate Multiple-Launch Artillery Battery (Dachnoye)
- 676th Separate Engineer Battalion (Dachnoye)
- 18th Machine Gun Artillery Division (Goryachie Klyuchi, Sakhalin Oblast)
  - 46th Machinegun Artillery Regiment (Lagunnoe)
  - 49th Machinegun Artillery Regiment

35th Army (Belogorsk)

- 38th Guards Motor Rifle Brigade (Belogorsk-Ekaterinoslavka)
- 64th Motor Rifle Brigade (Khabarovsk)
- 69th Covering Brigade in (Babstovo, Jewish Autonomous Oblast)
- 107th Rocket Brigade (Birobizhan)
- 165th Artillery Brigade (Belogorsk)
- 71st Anti-Aircraft Rocket Brigade (Srednebelaya, Amur Oblast)
- 54th C3 Brigade (Belogorsk)
- 37th Engineer Regiment (Berezovka, Amur Oblast)
- 135th Separate NBC Defence Battalion (Khabarovsk)

36th Army (Ulan Ude)

- 5th Separate Guards Tank Brigade (Ulan Ude)
- 37th Separate Guards Motor Rifle Brigade (Kyakhta)
- 103rd Rocket Brigade (Ulan-Ude)
- 1723rd Anti-Aircraft Rocket Regiment (Jida)
- 75th C3 Brigade (Ulan Ude)

Airborne Troops

- 11th Guards Air Assault Brigade
- 83rd Guards Air Assault Brigade

=== Air and Air Defence Forces ===
- 11th Air and Air Defence Forces Army
- Aviation of the Pacific Fleet
- 326th Heavy Bomber Aviation Division

=== Russian Naval Forces ===
- Pacific Fleet
  - Primorskiy Flotilla
  - Kamchatka Flotilla/Northeastern Group of Troops and Forces
  - Other naval units, ships and submarines
  - 155th Guards Red Banner Naval Infantry Brigade
  - 40th Naval Infantry Brigade
  - 55th Air Defense Division (Coastal Operations)
  - 165th Separate Naval Infantry Brigade (to be raised in 2018)

== Leadership ==
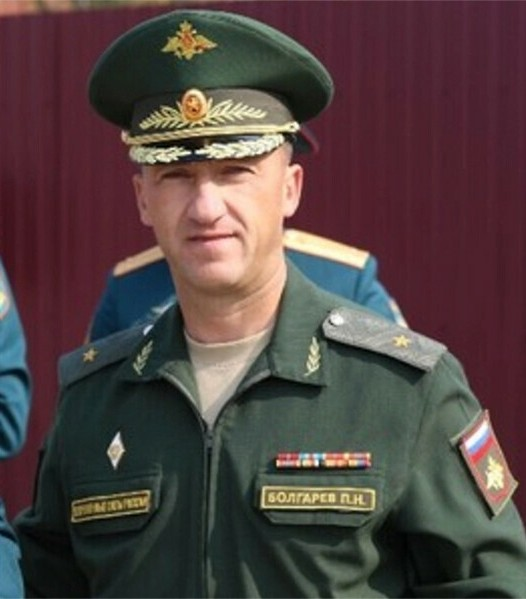
Colonel general Pyotr Bolgarev, current commander of the district.

=== Commanders ===
- Admiral Konstantin Sidenko (October 2010 – October 2013)
- Colonel-General Sergey Surovikin (October 2013 – November 2017)
- Lieutenant General Aleksandr Lapin (April – November 2017; acting)
- Colonel-General Aleksandr Zhuravlyov (November 2017 – November 2018)
- Colonel-General Gennady Zhidko (November 2018 – November 2021)
- Colonel-General Aleksandr Chaiko (November 2021 – June 2022)
- Lieutenant General Rustam Muradov (October 2022 - 3 April 2023)
- Lieutenant General Mikhail Nosulev (acting) (6 April 2023 - 20 April 2023)
- Lieutenant General Andrey Kuzmenko (20 April 2023 - May 2024)
- Lieutenant General Aleksandr Sanchik (May 2024 - November 2024; acting)
- Colonel General Andrey Ivanayev (November 2024 - August 2026)
- Colonel General Pyotr Bolgarev (August 2026 - present; acting)

=== Chiefs of Staff - First Deputy Commanders ===
- Lieutenant General Sergey Surovikin (October 2012 – 2013)
- Lieutenant General Aleksandr Lapin (2014 – April 2017)
- Lieutenant General Aleksandr Chaiko (April 2017 – November 2018)
- Colonel General Sergey Kuralenko (October 2018 – February 2020)
- Lieutenant General Yevgeny Nikiforov (February 2020 – December 2022) The Armed Forces of Ukraine reported on December 26, 2022 that Nikiforov was appointed as commander, Western Military District, and commander of the Russian western grouping of forces in Ukraine.
- Lieutenant General Aleksandr Sanchik (May 2023 - May 2024)
- Major General Andrey Kozlov (May 2024 - present)

=== Deputy Commanders ===
- Vice Admiral Sergei Alyokminsky (2014 – July 2019)
- Lieutenant General Sergei Sevryukov (July 2019 – January 2020)
- Lieutenant General Mikhail Nosulev (January 2020 – May 2024)

== See also ==
- List of military airbases in Russia
- Z (military symbol)
- Kuril Islands dispute
