= Rustam Muradov =

Russian general (born 1973)

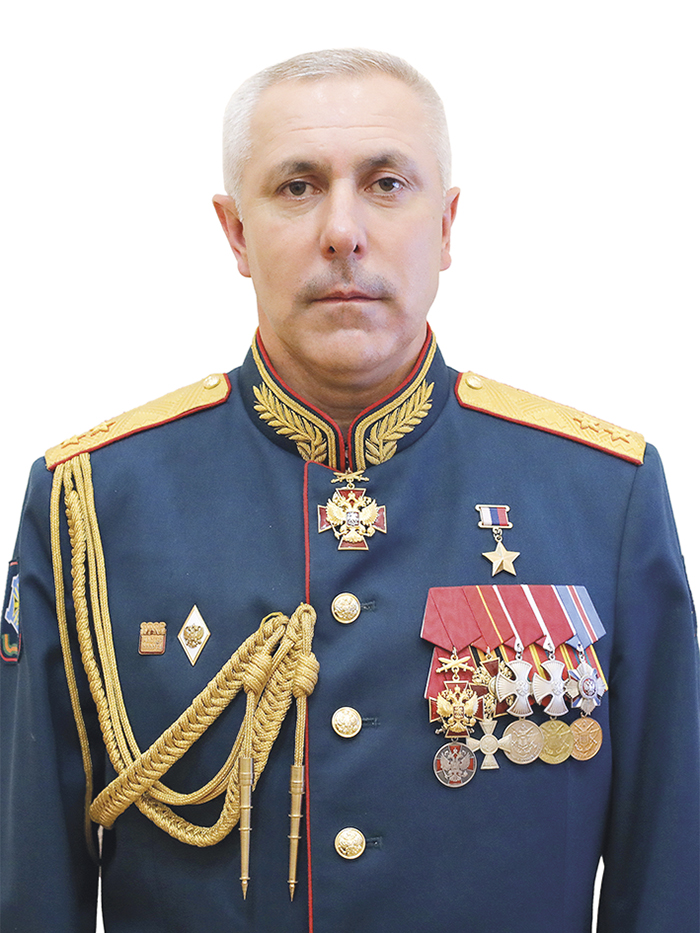
- Official portrait, 2020
- Native name: Рустам Мурадов
- Born: 21 March 1973 (age 53); Chinar, Dagestan ASSR, Soviet Union
- Allegiance: Soviet Union (to 1991); Russia
- Branch: Soviet Army; Russian Ground Forces
- Service years: 1990–present
- Rank: Colonel General
- Commands: 2nd Guards Combined Arms Army
- Conflicts: War of Dagestan; Second Chechen War; Syrian Civil War; Second Nagorno-Karabakh War; Peacekeeping operations in Nagorno-Karabakh; Russo-Ukrainian war; Russian invasion of Ukraine
- Awards: Hero of the Russian Federation; Order of Courage (2); Order of Military Merit; Order of Alexander Nevsky
- Alma mater: Leningrad Higher Combined Arms Command School; Frunze Military Academy; Russian General Staff Academy

Colonel General Rustam Usmanovich Muradov (Note: In this name that follows East Slavic naming customs, the patronymic is Usmanovich and the family name is Muradov.) (Note: Russian: Рустам Усманович Мурадов) (born 21 March 1973) is a Russian military officer who has been the Chief of the Main Staff and First Deputy Commander-in-Chief of the Russian Ground Forces since 2024.

Muradov was the Commander of the Eastern Military District from 2022 to 2023, and was previously the Deputy Commander of the Southern Military District from 2018 until 2022. He was awarded the title Hero of the Russian Federation in 2017.

In October 2022, General Muradov was appointed Commander of the Eastern Military District. In April 2023, amid the Russian invasion of Ukraine, Muradov was unofficially relieved of his command following a series of failed Russian attacks close to the eastern Ukrainian town of Vuhledar. These attacks resulted in notably high casualties for the Russian Armed Forces and the loss of scores of equipment pieces, including at least 26 tanks.

== Early life ==
Rustam Usmanovich Muradov was born in Chinar, Derbentsky District of the Dagestan ASSR within the Russian SFSR, then Soviet Union. Ethnically Tabasaran, his father Usman Muradov was born in Khanak in Tabasaransky District of the Dagestan ASSR but later moved with his parents north to Chinar, after the earthquake in southern Dagestan in 1966. There, he married Umizhat, and had three sons including Rustam.

== Military career ==
Muradov studied at the local Chinar high school. He then graduated from the Kazan Suvorov Military School. Being in military service since 1990, he graduated from the Leningrad Higher Combined Arms Command School and Frunze Military Academy with honors in 1995. In 2015, he graduated from the Military Academy of the General Staff of the Armed Forces of the Russian Federation.

In 1996, he was a platoon and company commander. In 2008, he was appointed the commander of the 242nd Motor Rifle Regiment, and until 2009, served as the commander of the 17th Separate Guards Motor Rifle Brigade. From 2009 to 2012, he was commander of the 36th Separate Guards Motor Rifle Brigade of the Eastern Military District. In 2012, he was promoted to a major general. From 2012 to 2013, he served as the head of the 473rd Lysychansk District Training Center of the Central Military District, located in the Sverdlovsk region of Russia ("Lysychanskaya" is an honorific given to a predecessor of one of the training academy's units, which participated in the liberation of the so-named Ukrainian city in 1943). From 2013 to 2015, he studied in the Military Academy of the General Staff of the Russian Armed Forces.

From 2015 to 2017, he served as the First Deputy Chief and Chief of Staff of the 41st Russian Combined Arms Army. In 2016, he was the representative of Russia at the Joint Russian-Ukrainian Center for Control and Coordination of Ceasefire and Stabilization of the Line of Delimitation of the Parties (JCCC) in Donbas. On 5 March 2016, in Donbas, Muradov, along with other representatives of the Russian side in the JCCC, came under fire for about 20 minutes.

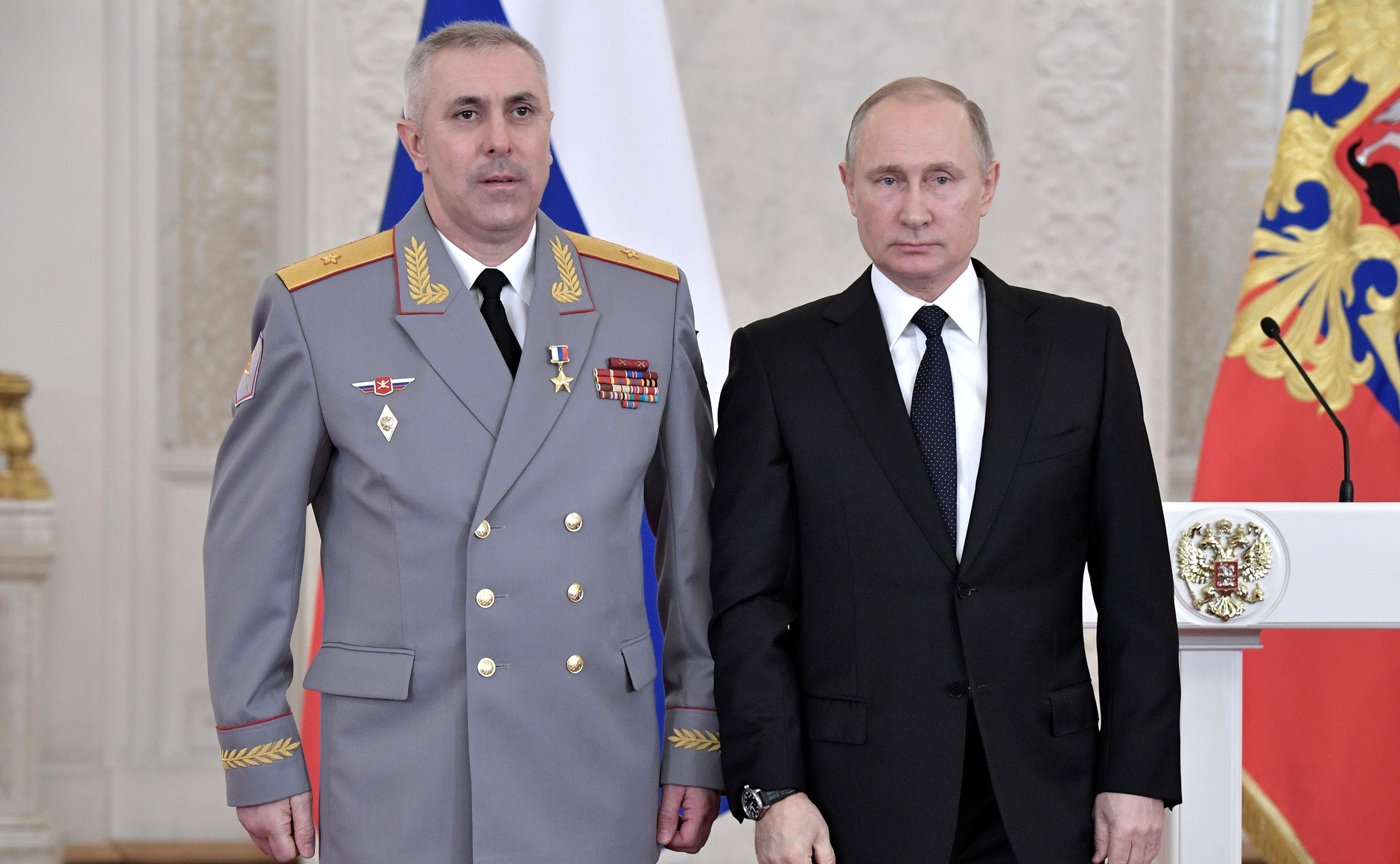
Muradov receiving the Hero of Russia award from Russian president Vladimir Putin

In 2017, he was appointed as a military adviser in Syria. Muradov was awarded the title of Hero of the Russian Federation in the same year. Then he served as the commander of the 2nd Guards Red Banner Army of the Central Military District until Andrey Kolotovkin replaced him in 2018. Since then, he is the deputy commander of the Southern Military District. He was promoted to lieutenant general on 20 February 2020 by the decree of the president of Russia, Vladimir Putin.

On 11 November 2020, he was appointed the commander of the Russian peacekeeping forces in Nagorno-Karabakh, after a peace agreement ending the war over the region. He was replaced by Major General Mikhail Kosobokov on 9 September 2021.

=== War in Ukraine ===
Muradov has been involved in the Russian war against Ukraine in several posts.

On 7 October 2022, General Muradov was appointed Commander of Eastern Military District, and was promoted to Colonel general on 18 February 2023.

In February 2023, Muradov came under fire for a failed offensive in the battle for Vuhledar, where reports of the loss of nearly 30 mostly intact infantry fighting vehicles and many Russian soldiers occurred.

On 26 March 2023, it was reported in Russian media that Muradov was dismissed from his position as Commander of Eastern Military District. While this news was not officially confirmed by the Russian government, head of Russian investigative channel Rybar Mikhail Zvinchuk stated that Muradov had been given an official vacation that is "almost tantamount to resignation". Following this, it was reported by Russian war correspondents that he had been replaced as acting commander of the Eastern Military District by Lieutenant General Andrey Kuzmenko, despite officially remaining at its head. The British Ministry of Defence described Muradov's replacement as the "most senior Russian military dismissal of 2023."

== Personal life ==
In February 2022, the European Union imposed personal sanctions against Muradov in connection with the Russian military operation in Ukraine. He was also sanctioned by New Zealand.

He is also sanctioned by the UK government in 2022 in relation to the Russo-Ukrainian War.

== See also ==
- List of Heroes of the Russian Federation

== Bibliography ==
- Назначения в Вооружённых Силах. Генерал-майор Мурадов Рустам Усманович. // Российское военное обозрение. 2018. No. 1 (165). — С.70.
- Назначения в Вооружённых Силах. Генерал-майор Мурадов Рустам Усманович. // Российское военное обозрение. 2018. No. 12 (176). — С.70.
