= 107th Rocket Brigade (Russia) =

107th Rocket Brigade (1997–present) 23rd Rocket Brigade (1960–1997) 77th Engineering Brigade (1958–1960) 77th Engineering Brigade RVGK (1953–1958)
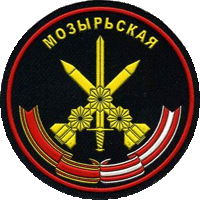
- Pre-2015 shoulder sleeve insignia of the brigade
- Active: 1953–present
- Country: Soviet Union (1953–1992); Russia (1992–present)
- Branch: Soviet Army (1953–1992); Russian Ground Forces (1992–present)
- Type: Tactical Ballistic Missile Brigade
- Part of: 35th Army
- Garrison/HQ: Birobidzhan
- Decorations: Order of Lenin; Order of the Red Banner
- Battle honours: Mozyr

The 107th Rocket Brigade (Military Unit Number 47062) is a tactical ballistic missile brigade of the Russian Ground Forces. Based in Birobidzhan, it is part of the 35th Army.

The brigade was originally formed in 1953 as an engineering brigade operating Scud missiles, serving in western Ukraine until its 1958 relocation to the Group of Soviet Forces in Germany in East Germany. There, it became the 23rd Rocket Brigade in 1960, and in 1981 relocated to Birobidzhan in eastern Russia. Serving in the Russian Ground Forces after the dissolution of the Soviet Union in 1992, the brigade became the 107th Rocket Brigade five years later after inheriting the lineage of a disbanded unit. By 2013 it had been reequipped with more modern Iskander-M tactical ballistic missiles.

== History ==
=== Cold War ===
The brigade traces its heritage back to the 77th Engineering Brigade of the Reserve of the Supreme High Command (RVGK), activated in May 1953 at Kapustin Yar. It included the 229th, 232nd, and 234th Separate Engineering Battalions, and a technical battery, and in October 1953 it was transferred to Bilokorovychi, in northern Ukraine, armed with R-11 Scud missiles. Two years later, the brigade was rearmed with R-17 Elbrus missiles. The 232nd Battalion was deployed to the Baikonur Test Center in July 1955 and was replaced there by the 229th Battalion a year later, with the 229th Battalion returning to Ukraine in July 1956. In July 1958 the 77th Brigade became part of the army, dropping the RVGK designation, and simultaneously relocated to Weißenfels, becoming part of the Group of Soviet Forces in Germany.

On 28 July 1960, the 77th was converted into the 23rd Rocket Brigade, and in May 1961 it relocated to Königsbrück. In 1962, it consisted of the 106th and 160th Separate Missile Battalions and a technical battery, with the 106th at Meissen and the 160th at Bischofswerda. In August 1963, the 273rd Battalion arrived in Königsbrück, raising the 23rd's strength to three battalions. In 1975, the 106th Battalion relocated to Königsbrück. Between 23 June and 17 July 1981, the brigade was relocated to Birobidzhan, where it became part of the 43rd Army Corps. Elements of the brigade were located at Semistochny, near Birobidzhan. In October 1989, when the corps disbanded, the 23rd transferred to the 35th Army.

=== Russian service ===
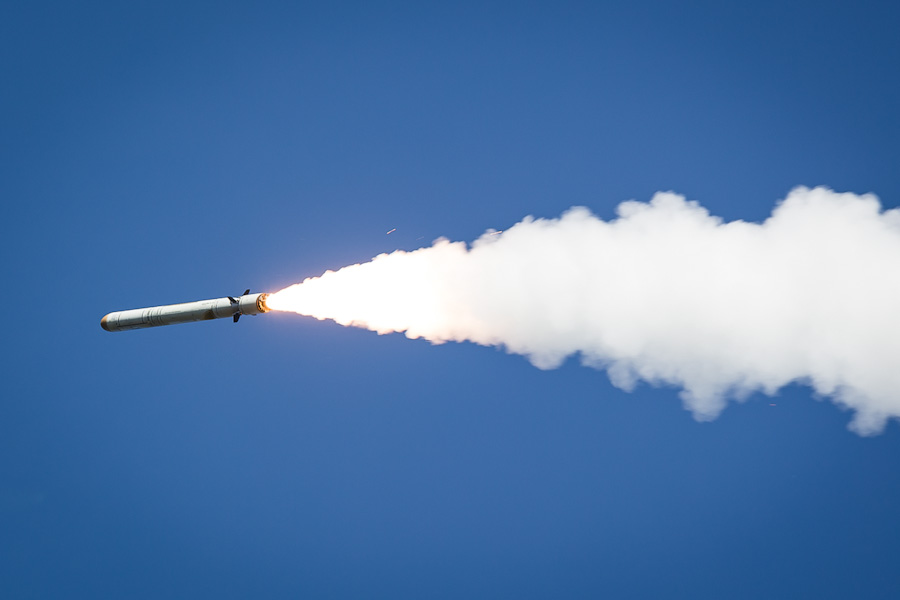
An Iskander launch of the brigade during Vostok-2014

On 1 September 1997, the brigade inherited the lineage of the disbanded 4th Rocket Brigade, and thus added the honorifics "Mozyr Red Banner Order of Lenin" to its title. That year, it was re-equipped with the OTR-21 Tochka tactical ballistic missile system. Between 2004 and 2011, the brigade was commanded by Vladimir Mazanenko, who was its first deputy commander from 1988. In 2005, it was announced that the brigade would begin rearming in 2007 with the updated 9K720 Iskander-M tactical ballistic missile system. In 2013, the brigade was rearmed with the Iskander, becoming the first Iskander brigade in the Eastern Military District. At the time it was commanded by Colonel Amir Devlikamov. In September 2014, the brigade conducted its first Iskander training launches, during exercise "Vostok-2014".

=== Russo-Ukrainian War ===
In September 2024, Reuters reported the brigade close to Taganrog.
