= 35th Guards Combined Arms Army =

Russian Ground Forces formation

35th Guards Combined Arms Red Banner Army
- 35-я гвардейская общевойсковая Краснознамённая армия
- 35th Army great emblem (from 2015)
- Active: 1969–present
- Country: Soviet Union (1969–1991); Russia (since 1991)
- Branch: Soviet Army (until 1991); Russian Ground Forces
- Type: Combined Arms
- Size: Field army
- Part of: Eastern Military District
- Garrison/HQ: Belogorsk, Amur Oblast
- Engagements: Russo-Ukrainian War; Invasion of Ukraine; Kyiv offensive; 2023 Ukrainian counteroffensive
- Decorations: Order of the Red Banner; Guards

Commanders
- Current commander: Major General Sergei Nyrkov

Insignia
NATO Map Symbol
35
ОА

The 35th Guards Combined Arms Red Banner Army (Russian: 35-я гвардейская общевойсковая Краснознамённая армия) is a field army of the Russian Ground Forces. It was formed at Belogorsk when Sino-Soviet tensions rose in the late 1960s in the Far East. The army became part of the Eastern Military District in 2010.

== Soviet Union ==
The 35th Army was formed in June 1969 from the 29th Army Corps. In 1968–69 four divisions were gathered to become part of the corps, later army, in the Far East: 265th Motor Rifle Division arrived in 1968, 266th Motor Rifle Division arrived from the North Caucasus Military District and the 31st Guards Motor Rifle Division from the Baltic Military District in 1969, and the 192nd Motor Rifle Division was activated that same year.

On 16 May 1977, the 31st Guards Motor Rifle Division became the 21st Guards Tank Division. In February 1980, the 67th Motor Rifle Division was transferred to the army from the Leningrad Military District.

In 1988 the 35th Army consisted of the:

Headquarters 35th Red Banner Army (Belogorsk, Amur Oblast):

- 21st Guards Tank Division (Belogorsk): 2nd Guards Tank Regiment, 125th Guards Tank Regiment (Ekaterinoslavka), 111th Guards Tank Regiment, 277th Guards Motor Rifle Regiment, 64th Guards Artillery Regiment, 1064th Guards Anti-Aircraft Rocket Regiment
- 67th Motor Rifle Division (Skovorodino): 422nd Tank Regiment, 1212th Motor Rifle Regiment, 1216th Motor Rifle Regiment, 1217th Motor Rifle Regiment, 1302nd Artillery Regiment, 1042nd Anti-Aircraft Rocket Regiment
- 192nd Motor Rifle Division (Blagoveshchensk): 371st Tank Regiment (Svobodnyy), 190th Motor Rifle Regiment (Shimanovsk), 684th Motor Rifle Regiment (Svobodnyy), 679th Motor Rifle Regiment (Blagoveshensk), 1219th Artillery Regiment (Svobodnyy), 1414th Anti-Aircraft Rocket Regiment (Blagoveshchensk)
- 265th Motor Rifle Division (Vozzhaevka (Belogorsk-15), Belogorsky District): 373rd Tank Regiment, 212th, 421st and 695th Motor Rifle Regiments, artillery regiment, anti-aircraft rocket regiment
- 266th Motor Rifle Division (Raychikhinsk/Raichikhinsk): 376th Tank Regiment, 155th, 430th, 785th Motor Rifle Regiments, artillery regiment, anti-aircraft rocket regiment
- 12th Fortified Area (Blagoveshchensk)
- Army Troops
  - 768th Separate Protection and Security Company (Belogorsk)
  - 49th Separate Tank Regiment (Belogorsk)
  - 827th Separate Spetsnaz Company (Belogorsk)
  - 153rd Rocket Brigade (Belogorsk)
  - 178th Separate Helicopter Squadron (Belogorsk)
  - Separate Unmanned Reconnaissance Squadron (Belogorsk)
  - 54th Separate Communications Regiment (Belogorsk)
  - 668th Communications Center (Belogorsk)
  - Separate Chemical Defense Battalion (Belogorsk)
  - 14th Separate Armored Train (Magdagachi)
  - 15th Separate Armored Train (Svobodny)
  - 16th Separate Armored Train (Arkhara)
  - 165th Machine Gun Artillery Brigade (Nikolskoye)
  - 38th Reactive Artillery Regiment (Berezovka)
  - Reconnaissance Artillery Regiment (Berezovka)
  - 1983rd Separate Engineer-Sapper Battalion (Berezovka)
  - 396th Separate Reconnaissance Artillery Battalion (Nikolskoye)
  - 71st Anti-Aircraft Rocket Brigade (Srednebelaya)
  - Separate Pontoon-Bridge Battalion (Dzhalinda)
  - 318th Separate Radiotechncial Regiment of Special Designation (OsNaz) (Ledyanaya)
  - Separate Electronic Warfare Battalion (Ledyanaya)
  - 1719th Separate Radio Relay and Cable Battalion (Pozdeyevka)
  - 1899th Separate Radiotechnical Battalion PVO (Panino)
  - 43rd Materiel Support Brigade (Tomichi)
  - 6508th Repair and Restoration Base (Vozzhayevka)

== Russian Federation ==
The 35th Army is still stationed in the Eastern Military District with its headquarters at Belogorsk.

Until the 2008–2011 reform when it became the 35CAA, it consisted of three divisions: the 21st Guards (Belogorsk) and 270th (Krasnaya Rechka, Khabarovsk) Motor Rifle Divisions, and the 128th Machine-Gun Artillery Division (Babstovo), along with smaller combat and support units.

In 2009, the 128th Machine-Gun Artillery Division became the 69th Separate Fortress Brigade. In 2010, the 270th Motor Rifle Division became the 243rd Weapons and Equipment Storage Base. The 21st Guards Motor Rifle Division appears to have become the 38th Separate Guards Motor Rifle Brigade.

In 2016, the army consisted of the following units:

- 38th Separate Guards Motor Rifle Brigade (Belogorsk)
- 64th Separate Motor Rifle Brigade (Khabarovsk-41)
- 69th Covering Brigade (Babstovo)
- 107th Rocket Brigade (Birobidzhan/Semistochny)
- 165th Artillery Brigade (Nikolskoye, Amur Oblast)
- 71st Anti-Aircraft Rocket Brigade (Srednebeloye-2)
- 35th NBC Protection Regiment (Belogorsk) (MUN 59792)
- 54th Headquarters Brigade (Belogorsk)
- 553th Signal Battalion (Yuzhno-Sakhalinsk)
- 668th Communication Center (Belogorsk)
- 103rd Logistic Support Brigade (Belogorsk)
- 240th Weapon Storage and Repair Base (Belogorsk)
- 243th Weapon Storage and Repair Base (Khabarovsk)
- 253th Special Purpose Battalion GRU

=== 2022 invasion of Ukraine ===
In the context of the 2022 Russian invasion of Ukraine, elements of the 35th Army (including units from the 38th Motor Rifle Brigade, 64th Motor Rifle Brigade, 69th Fortress Brigade, 165th Artillery Brigade and 107th Rocket Brigade) had been deployed to Belarus and were participating in active combat operations.

In June 2022, Russian military bloggers reported that the 35CAA was routed in the battle of Izyum and that the remnants of the army withdrew to Belgorod, claiming that the number of infantry in the brigades of the army had fallen to "12-15 people (64th brigade), the combined number of 38th and 64th motorised brigades – less than 100 of truly combat-ready infantry in each brigade." On 4 June 2022 Ukrainian sources claimed that Ukrainian forces had almost completely annihilated the 35CAA.

In August 2022 the remnants of the 35CAA were reportedly sent to defend the occupied territory of Kherson Oblast on the West Bank of the Dnieper river, alongside the 49th Combined Arms Army.

On 30 August 2025, The Ukrainian I Want to Live project claimed that 18 Russian officers were killed in an arson attack on a command post of the 35th Combined Arms Army near Voskresenska, Zaporizhzhia Oblast.

On 6 April 2026, the army was awarded the "Guards" status.

== Commanders ==
=== Soviet era ===
The following officers commanded the 35th Army from 1969 to 1991.

- Major/Lieutenant General Yury Zarudin (25 April 1967 – 8 February 1973)
- Lieutenant General Yury Potapov (9 February 1973 – 18 December 1975)
- Major/Lieutenant General Vyacheslav Dubinin (January 1976 – 1979)
- Major/Lieutenant General Ivan Morozov (1982 – September 1984)
- Major/Lieutenant General Fyodor Kuzmin (September 1984 – 5 February 1987)
- Major General Valery Kotin (February 1987 – October 1988)
- Lieutenant General Vladimir Toporov (October 1988 – August 1989)

=== Russian Federation ===
- Lieutenant General Yevgeny Vysotsky (August 1989 – September 1991)
- Lieutenant General Evgeni Nikolaevich Malakhov (December 1993 – June 1996)
- Lieutenant General Anatoli Mikhailovich Nutrikhin (June 1996 – August 1999)
- Lieutenant General Aleksandr Vladimirovich Kutikov (August 1999 – June 2002)
- Lieutenant General Oleg Leonidovich Salyukov (June 2002 – November 2003)
- Lieutenant General Nikolai Vasilyevich Bogdanovski (November 2003 – June 2006)
- Lieutenant General Igor Nikolaevich Turchenyuk (June 2006 – March 2011)
- Lieutenant General Sergei Vitalyevich Solomatin (April 2011 – January 2017)
- Lieutenant General Sergei Valeryevich Chebotaryov (January 2017 – September 2020)
- Lieutenant General Aleksandr Semyonovich Sanchik (September 2020 – 2023)
- Major General Sergei Semyonovich Nyrkov (2023 – present)
