= 338th Guards Rocket Artillery Brigade =

338th Guards Rocket Artillery Brigade (196?–present) 653th Guards Rocket Artillery Regiment (194?–196?) 72nd Guards Mortar Regiment (1942–194?)
- Russian: 338-я гвардейская реактивная артиллерийская бригада
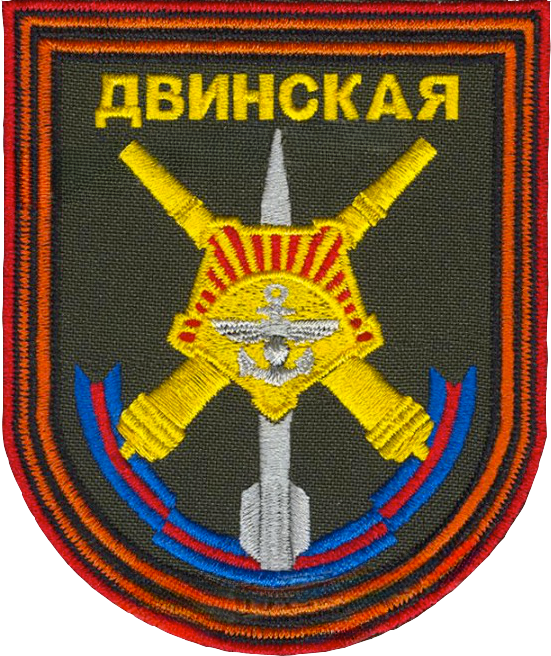
- Sleeve patch of the 338th Guards Rocket Artillery Brigade
- Active: May 1942 – present
- Country: Russia
- Branch: Russian Ground Forces
- Type: Artillery brigade
- Part of: Eastern Military District
- Garrison/HQ: Ussuriysk (Primorsky Krai)
- Engagements: World War II; Russo-Ukrainian War
- Decorations: Order of Alexander Nevsky
- Battle honours: Dvinsk

The 338th Guards Dvinsk Order of Alexander Nevsky Rocket Artillery Brigade (Military Unit Number 57367, abbreviated in Russian as 338 reabr), is an artillery (Multiple rocket launcher) formation of the Russian Ground Forces. The brigade is based in Ussuriysk, Primorye Territory. It is equipped with versions of the BM-27 Uragan (9K57).

The unit is part of the Eastern Military District.

== History ==
Its predecessor was formed in May 1942 as the 72nd Guards Mortar Regiment. On 20 June 1942, the unit received its Guards battle flag.

The regiment was armed with BM-13 Katyusha 122 mm multiple rocket launcher systems. The 72nd Guards Mortar Regiment fought in the Great Patriotic War and the Soviet-Japanese War. For participation in the Rezhitsa-Dvinsk Offensive in 1944, the regiment was awarded the Order of Alexander Nevsky and the Dvinsk honorific.

The 72nd Guards Mortar Regiment was part of the "Active Army" from July 7, 1942 to February 5, 1943, and from March 14, 1944 to May 9, 1945. During the Soviet-Japanese war, the regiment operated from August 9 to September 3, 1945.

After the end of the war, the regiment was reorganized as the 653rd Guards Rocket Artillery Regiment. It became the 338th Guards Rocket Artillery Brigade in the 1960s, and in the late 1980s was part of the 15th Guards Artillery Division.

In 2011, the unit was presented with a new Russian battle flag and its old Soviet banner retired to the Historical Museum of the Eastern Military District.

The brigade participated in the Russo-Ukrainian War and was involved in the Battle of Vuhledar.
