= Andrey Kuzmenko (general) =

Russian military general

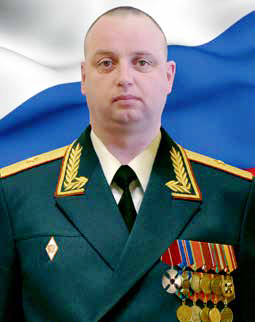
- Born: Andrey Vladimirovich Kuzmenko; 10 November 1972 (age 53); Baku, Azerbaijan SSR, USSR
- Military career
- Allegiance: Soviet Union; Russia
- Branch: Russian Ground Forces
- Service years: 1990–
- Rank: Colonel general
- Commands: Eastern Military District (20 April 2023); 6th Combined Arms Army (2015-2019)
- Conflicts: Russo-Ukrainian War; Russian invasion of Ukraine
- Awards: Order of Courage; Order of Military Merit; Medal of Suvorov

Andrey Vladimirovich Kuzmenko (Russian: Андрей Владимирович Кузьменко; born 10 November 1972) is a Russian Colonel general (as of 2023) who was the commander of the Eastern Military District from 20 April 2023, until he was replaced in May 2024.

== Biography ==
Kuzmenko graduated from Omsk Higher Combined Arms Command School in 1994 and became the commander of a reconnaissance platoon in the Transbaikal Military District. He progressed through the ranks and eventually commanded a compound in the North Caucasus Military District.

After graduating from the Military Academy of the General Staff of the Armed Forces of Russia, he served as commander of the 6th Combined Arms Army from 2015 to 2019. He was subsequently Head of the Department of Management at the Academy of the General Staff.

Kuzmenko was promoted to Deputy Commander of the Southern Military District.

Kuzmenko was the commander from 20 April 2023 of the Eastern Military District, which he took over after Rustam Muradov's failure in the Battle of Vuhledar, until he was replaced in May 2024 by Aleksandr Sanchik.
