= Joint Centre of Control and Coordination =

2014-17 ceasefire-monitoring and safety-enforcement organization

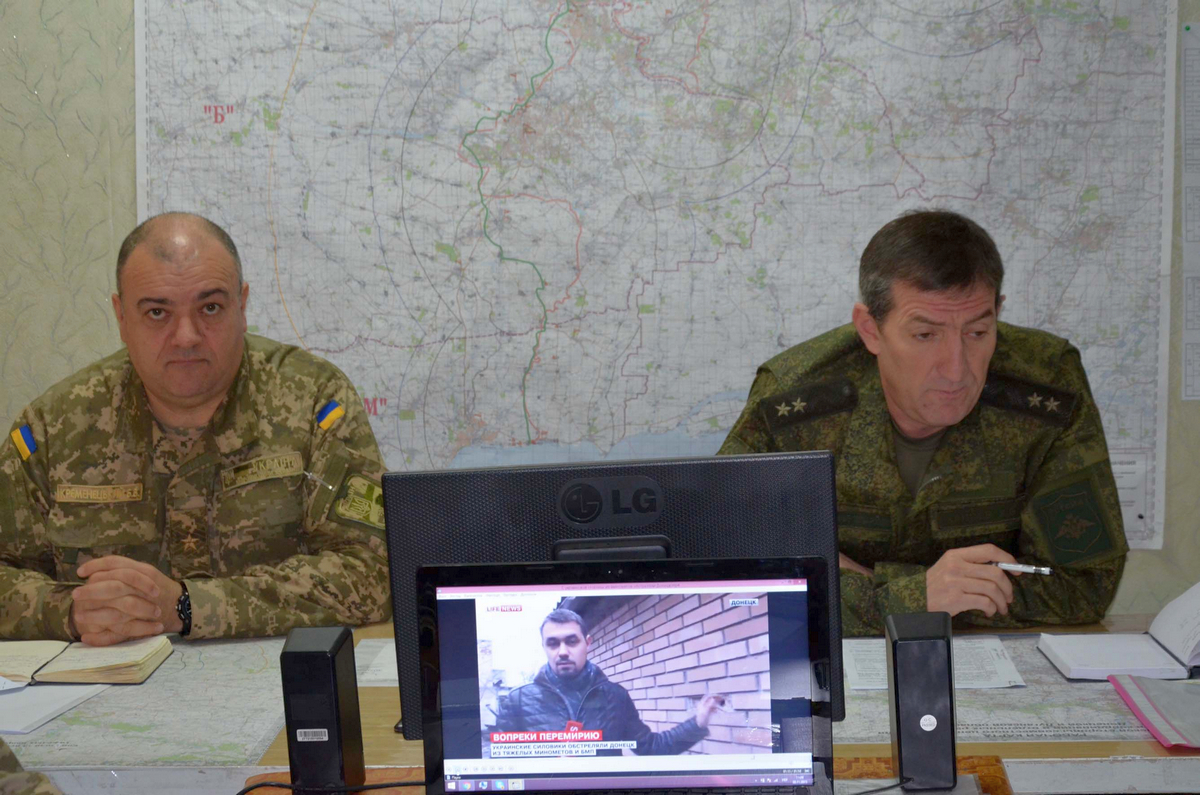
JCC, 2015

The Joint Centre for Control and Coordination on ceasefire and stabilization of the demarcation line, abbr. JCCC, was an organization composed of Ukrainian and Russian military officers, whose role is to help implement the Minsk ceasefire agreements and ensure the safety of OSCE monitors in the Russo-Ukrainian War. It was established September 26, 2014. In April 2015, Ukrainian and Russian representatives began to keep separate logs of ceasefire violations. The Russian members left Ukraine in December 2017.

== Headquarters ==
The JCCC established headquarters in Soledar, in Ukraine's Donetsk Oblast. In October 2014, they moved to Debaltseve. On January 21, 2015, the Russian contingent returned to Soledar because of the deteriorating situation. On February 1, several rockets hit the Debaltseve headquarters, after which the Ukrainians moved to Soledar.

== Composition ==
At the end of September 2014 the JCCC working group included 76 members of the Russian Armed Forces. According to Ukrainian Major General Oleksander Rozmanin, the JCCC started with 17 Ukrainian members and 18 Russians. Later it consisted of 128 officers, organized into 8 groups on government-controlled territory and 8 on non-government-controlled (4 each in Luhansk and Donetsk oblasts).

On December 19, 2017, the Russian staff of the JCCC were recalled by the foreign ministry of the Russian Federation, and left Ukraine, accusing the Ukrainians of obstruction. Ukrainian officials suggested the Russians withdrew from the JCCC to be able to escalate hostilities and blame the Ukrainian military for ceasefire violations.

Since then, members of the Russian separatist forces in Donbas have operated in JCCC markings, with the support of Russia but not the other members of the Trilateral Contact Group (Ukraine and the OSCE). In October 2021, Ukrainian Forces captured a member of the 2nd Army Corps, a Russian citizen resident in Luhansk oblast, while he was wearing JCCC markings.

Russian forces continue to use the original JCCC logos and symbols after the start of the full-scale Russian invasion of Ukraine on February 24, 2022, when presenting results of alleged Ukrainian fire on its infrastructure on the occupied territories, regardless of the fact that the original JCCC stopped operations in 2017 and it has no "joint" component.

== Commanders ==
Russian Armed Forces

- September 2014 – Lt. Gen. Aleksandr Lentsov
- December 2014 – Maj. Gen. Aleksandr Viaznikov
- End of February 2015 – Col. Gen. Aleksandr Lentsov
- Summer 2015 – Lt. Gen. Aleksandr Romanchuk

Ukrainian Armed Forces

- September 2014 – Lt. Gen Yurii Dumanskyi
- October 2014 – Lt. Gen Volodymyr Askarov
- December 2014 – Maj. Gen. Oleksandr Rozmanin
- Maj. Gen Andrii Taran
- August 2015 – Maj. Gen. Borys Kremenetskyi
- 2016 — Maj. Gen Radion Tymoshenko
- 2016—2017 — Maj. Gen Anatolii Petrenko
- 2017 — Maj. Gen. Bohdan Bondar

== See also ==
- OSCE Special Monitoring Mission to Ukraine
