= Andrey Ivanayev =

Russian military officer (born 1972)

- Андрей Сергеевич Иванаев
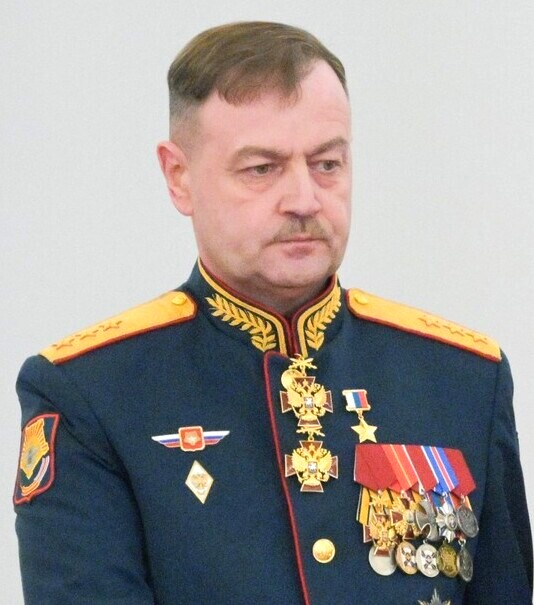
- Ivanayev in December 2025
- Born: Andrey Sergeyevich Ivanayev; 19 January 1972 (age 54); Uralsk, Kazakh SSR, Soviet Union
- Education: Chelyabinsk Higher Tank Command School; Combined Arms Academy of the Armed Forces; Russian General Staff Academy
- Military career
- Allegiance: Russia
- Branch: Russian Ground Forces
- Service years: 1992–present
- Rank: Colonel General
- Commands: Central Military District; Eastern Military District; 20th Guards Combined Arms Army; 5th Separate Guards Motor Rifle Taman Brigade
- Conflicts: Syrian civil war; Russian intervention; Battle of Aleppo; Deir ez-Zor offensive; Russo-Ukrainian war; 2022 Kharkiv counteroffensive
- Awards: Hero of the Russian Federation

Colonel General Andrey Sergeyevich Ivanayev (Russian: Андрей Сергеевич Иванаев; born 20 January 1972) is a Russian military officer who has served as the commander of the Central Military District and the Group of Forces "Center" since 2026.

He graduated from the Chelyabinsk Higher Tank Command School in 1992 and commanded motor rifle units in the Russian Ground Forces. Ivanayev went on to graduate from the Combined Arms Academy in 2001 and the General Staff Academy in 2013. He participated in the Russian intervention in the Syrian civil war, being involved in the Battle of Aleppo in 2016 and the lifting of the siege of Deir ez-Zor in 2017.

Ivanayev was the commander of the 20th Guards Combined Arms Army from 2018 to 2022, and in that role, he took part in fighting against the 2022 Kharkiv counteroffensive. He commanded the Eastern Military District and the Group of Forces "East" in the Russo-Ukrainian war from 2024 to 2026, and was awarded the title Hero of the Russian Federation in 2025.

== Early life and education ==
Andrey Ivanayev was born on 19 January 1972 in Uralsk, Kazakh Soviet Socialist Republic (present-day Oral, Kazakhstan). In 1988 he entered the Ulyanovsk Guards Higher Tank Command School, and later continued his studies at the Chelyabinsk Higher Tank Command School, which he successfully graduated in 1992.

== Military career ==
In the early 1990s, he commanded a tank platoon in the 409th Motorized Rifle Regiment of the 147th Motor Rifle Division of the Group of Russian Forces of the Transcaucasus (former Transcaucasian Military District). After graduating from the Combined Arms Academy in 2001, he was appointed the deputy commander of the 1st Guards Motorized Rifle Sevastopol Regiment of the 2nd Guards Motorized Rifle Taman Division named after M.I. Kalinina.

From 2006 to 2008, he was the commander of the 1st Guards Motorized Rifle Regiment. In 2008, he was promoted to the deputy commander of the 2nd Guards Motorized Rifle Taman Division.

In 2009, he was promoted to the commander of the 5th Guards Separate Motorized Rifle Taman Brigade. On 23 February 2011, by decree of the president of Russia, Ivanayev was promoted to major general. In 2013, he graduated with honors from the Russian General Staff Academy.

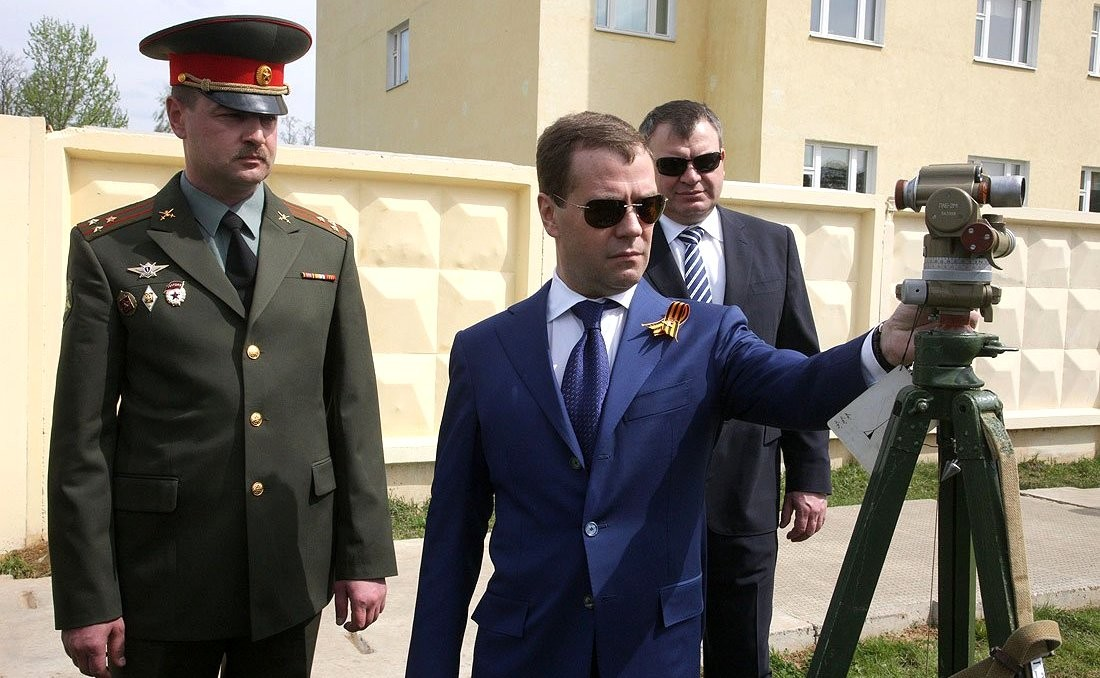
Ivanayev with Russian President Dmitry Medvedev and Defence Minister Anatoly Serdyukov, 5 May 2010

From 2013 to 2014, he was the head of the 392nd District Training Centre of the Pacific of the Eastern Military District.

In 2015, he was the deputy commander, then promoted in 2017, as the chief of staff and first deputy commander of the 36th Guards Combined Arms Army of the Eastern Military District. Around that time he took part in the Syrian civil war, participating in the Battle of Aleppo and the lifting of the siege of Deir ez-Zor.

By decree of the president of Russia in May 2018, Ivanyev had been appointed commander of the 20th Guards Combined Arms Army of the Western Military District. On 15 May, in Voronezh, the chief of staff of the Western Military District, Lieutenant General Viktor Astapov, presented Major General Ivanayev with a personal standard and introduced him to the personnel of the formation. On 11 June 2019, by decree of the president of the Russia, he was promoted to lieutenant general. During the Russo-Ukrainian war the 20th army under his command fought against the 2022 Kharkiv counteroffensive, preventing the Armed Forces of Ukraine from advancing in its area.

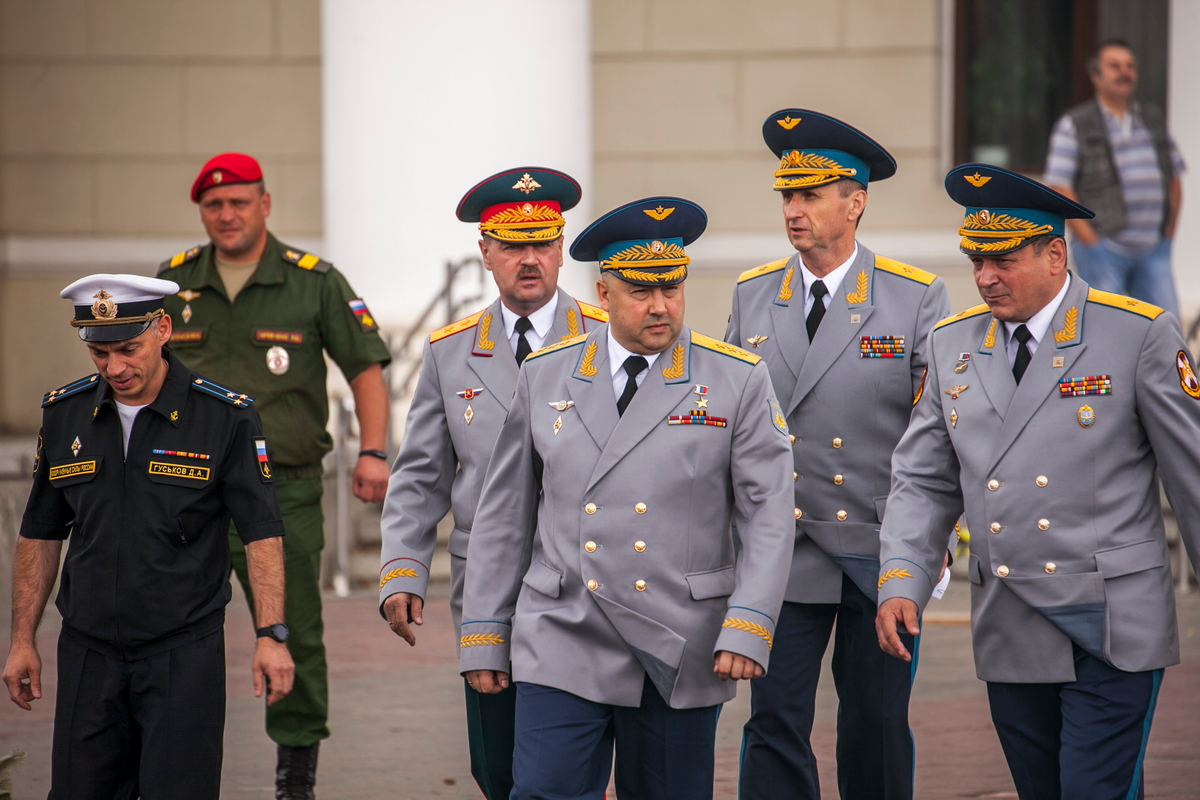
Ivanayev with Sergey Surovikin among other officers in Voronezh, 29 June 2019

In November 2024, Ivanayev was appointed as commander of Eastern Military District and the Group of Forces "East". He was promoted to the rank of colonel general on 21 February 2025, and was awarded the title Hero of the Russian Federation in December 2025. Under his command, units made advancements in the Donetsk, Zaporozhye, and Dnipro regions.

In August 2026 he was placed in charge of Central Military District and the Group of Forces Center.

== Awards and decorations ==
Ivanayev's awards include:

- Hero of the Russian Federation
- Order "For Merit to the Fatherland"
  - Second Class
  - Third Class
  - Fourth Class
- Order of Alexander Nevsky
- Order of Courage
- Order of Military Merit
- Medal "For Military Merit"

== Personal life ==
Ivanayev is married and has two children.

=== Sanctions ===
On 25 February 2022, he was placed under Australian sanctions. On 15 March, he was sanctioned by Britain. On 18 March, he was placed under sanctions from New Zealand. On 6 May, he has been sanctioned by Canada for “complicity in President Putin’s choice to invade a peaceful and sovereign country.” By decree of the president of Ukraine, Volodymyr Zelenksyy, from 19 October, he is under sanctions from Ukraine.

On 23 June 2023, he was also included in the sanctions list of all EU countries for the deployment of Russian troops that are participating “in Russia’s aggressive war against Ukraine.”
