= Pozdeyevka =

Pozdeyevka Поздеевка
- Selo
- Location within Amur Oblast Location within Russia
- Coordinates: 50°35′N 128°53′E
- Country: Russia
- Region: Amur Oblast
- District: Romnensky District
- Time zone: UTC+9:00

Pozdeyevka (Russian: Поздеевка) is a rural locality (a selo) in Pozdeyevsky Selsoviet of Romnensky District, Amur Oblast, Russia. The population was 1,544 as of 2018. There are 17 streets.

== Geography ==
Pozdeyevka is located 39 km southwest of Romny (the district's administrative centre) by road. Verkhnebeloye is the nearest rural locality.
