= 2001 Russian military reform =

Military reform in the Russian Federation (2001–2004) (Russian: Военная реформа в РФ (2001—2004)) were a series of measures to reform the Russian Armed Forces, dating back to attempts to reform them in the 1990s following the collapse of the Soviet Union (mostly curtailed due to lack of funds). The reform was accompanied by active public discussions. One of the key issues was the question of the possibility of transforming the Russian Armed Forces to a contract basis, the term of service for conscripts. The reform never acquired a fully completed character, and subsequently the reform actively continued. The reform is the second reform in the Military history of the Russian Federation, following the 1997 military reform.

== Development of reform concepts ==
There were probably two key centers for developing military reform, alternative to each other. One was formed within the apparatus of the Ministry of Defense. The other arose around the Institute for the Economy in Transition with the involvement of defense experts from the State Duma and the Academy of Military Sciences. Its actual inspiration and important developer of this version of the reform was Yegor Gaidar, who headed the Institute for the Economy in Transition.

In 2001, the Institute for the Economy in Transition with the involvement of defense experts from the State Duma and the Academy of Military Sciences conducted a study on the problems of forming the system of manning the Russian Armed Forces. A draft Concept of the Federal Target Program (FTP) "Transition to Manning Military Positions Primarily with Contract Servicemen" was developed with a package of relevant documents (financial and economic justification).

Yegor Gaidar was of the opinion that "the conscription system, combining the proclaimed universal military service, 2-year service and a wide range of benefits and deferments, leads to the army being staffed primarily by young men from the most socially disadvantaged families who are unable to take advantage of the existing benefits." At the same time, conscription, by its economic nature, is "a tax paid in the form of compulsory personal service." As a result, taking into account a number of circumstances and a lack of financial resources, his group proposed a scheme for the transition to a system in which regular troops are replenished with privates and junior command personnel only on a voluntary basis, but at the same time compulsory military service for the overwhelming majority of those liable for military service is retained, limited to six to eight months, but no more.

The version developed by the Ministry of Defense also ultimately had a significant influence on the reform being carried out. In contrast to the version of the Institute for the Economy in Transition (where the priority task was precisely the "reform of the system of manning the armed forces"), for the Ministry of Defense the key task was "the creation of permanent readiness units, and not all of them, but that part of them from the Ground Forces, Airborne Forces and Marines that the General Staff assigned to this category." Supporters of both reform versions criticized each other. Including in official letters to the president. The final reform was a compromise and combined both concepts.

Before the start of the reform, expenditures on the Armed Forces amounted to about 6 billion US dollars in 2000. The level of expenditures of 3.5% of GDP planned during the reform years of the 1990s was never achieved. Meager funding led the authorities to strive to reduce the armed forces to a level of approximately 0.8-0.9 million servicemen in order to maintain their combat effectiveness, which encountered resistance from military officials. The reform outlined two opposing models of reduction. One plan envisaged a reduction primarily of Strategic nuclear forces in order to free up financial resources for the benefit of conventional forces. The other plan, supported by Minister of Defence Igor Sergeyev, envisaged, on the contrary, an increase in spending on strategic nuclear forces. The rejection of the second plan led to the resignation of Igor Sergeyev and his replacement by a new Defense Minister, Sergei Ivanov.

== Transition to a reform policy ==
In 2001, with the inauguration of Defense Minister Sergei Ivanov, another military reform was announced. The development of a consistent reform became possible not only due to the emergence of budget funds for it, but also due to the fact that in 2001 active military operations in Chechnya ended.

During the reform, the military budget began to increase consistently, and the troops, after a long break, began to engage in combat training again. At first, it was said that Russia would have a professional army - there was a strong demand in society for a complete departure from the conscription system. But then it was announced that, having studied foreign experience, the country's leadership decided to stop at a mixed method of staffing the Armed Forces. Despite the influx of contract soldiers and the transfer of entire military units to a contract method of staffing, the army did not become completely professional.

In effort to reduce the number of Military districts of Russia, on September 1, 2001, the Volga–Ural Military District was formed from the merger of the Ural and Volga Military Districts in accordance with the Decree of the President of Russia of March 24, 2001 within the administrative borders of the republics of Bashkortostan, Mari El, Mordovia, Tatarstan, Udmurtia and Chuvashia, the Kirov, Kurgan, Orenburg, Penza, Perm, Samara, Saratov, Sverdlovsk, Tyumen, Ulyanovsk and Chelyabinsk regions, the Komi-Permyak, Khanty-Mansiysk and Yamalo-Nenets Autonomous Okrugs. The district headquarters were located in Yekaterinburg.

In early 2001, the following documents were approved: the plan for the construction of the Armed Forces of the Russian Federation for 2001-2005, plans for the construction of branches and arms of the armed forces, etc. - a total of 33 documents.

Since June 1, 2001, the Strategic Missile Forces were transformed from a branch of the armed forces into two independent but closely interacting branches of the centrally subordinated forces: the Strategic Missile Forces and the Space Forces. Thus, the Armed Forces began to consist of three branches of the armed forces: the Ground Forces, the Navy, the Air Force and two separate branches of the armed forces: the Strategic Missile Forces and the Space Forces.

On January 1, 2002, the Ministry of Defense switched to a single system of procurement for weapons and military equipment (WME).

On June 28, 2002, the State Duma adopted the law "On Alternative Civilian Service", according to which a citizen of the Russian Federation had the right to service not associated with the use of weapons. The term of alternative civil service was determined at 3.5 years (for university graduates it was 2 times less).

In 2003, Army Aviation became part of the Russian Air Force.

== Completion of the reform ==
In 2004, Sergei Ivanov declared that "the period of fundamental restructuring and cardinal reform of the Armed Forces is over, and we are moving to normal military development".

As a result of the reform and the subsequent "normal military development", some units were completely transferred to a contract method of staffing. At the same time, the number of deferments for conscripts was reduced. One of the important consequences of the reform was that the term of conscription in Russia was reduced to one year (in 2007, conscription lasted for one and a half years, and since 2008, for one year). Although it was less than the option proposed by Yegor Gaidar, it nevertheless indicated a desire to gradually abandon the conscription system for staffing the active army.

As part of the general monetization of benefits, most benefits for the military were replaced by cash payments, and the provision of officers and warrant officers with their own housing gave way to a program of mortgage lending to military personnel. It was announced that the practice of filling primary officer positions with graduates of civilian universities (the so-called "two-year students") would be curtailed, and that measures would be taken to increase the attractiveness of military service for graduates of military universities - solving the housing problems of servicemen, social guarantees and benefits, a significant increase in pay, etc.

An important indicator of the completion of the military reform stage and the transition to building up military forces, rather than changing the system of their formation, was the statement by President Vladimir Putin in his state of the nation address to the Federal Assembly on May 26, 2004, in which he proclaimed the beginning of mass rearmament, announced the development of new types of weapons of strategic, tactical and operational significance, social guarantees for servicemen and the issue of control over finances spent by the unwieldy army mechanism.

According to a number of experts, the military reform was accompanied by serious violations of the law and the rights of servicemen. One of the confirmations of this is the significant increase in the number of appeals by servicemen to military courts to protect their rights. In the first half of 2002 alone, more than 40 thousand appeals and complaints from military personnel regarding the infringement of their constitutional rights were filed with the military prosecutor's office.

== Results ==
By the end of the reform, the Russian Armed Forces included 6 military districts, 4 fleets, 8 Combined arms armies, 6 Air Force and Air Defense armies, 6 flotillas, 2 army corps and 2 squadrons.

The authorized strength of the Armed Forces was 1,132,000 military personnel and 867,000 civilian personnel. Structurally, the Russian Armed Forces began to consist of three types of military branches: Ground Forces, Air Force, Navy and three separate branches of the armed forces: Strategic Rocket Forces, Space Forces and Airborne Forces.

In 2005, the Ground Forces began to consist of 6 military districts and the Kaliningrad Special Region. They included 8 Combined arms armies and 2 army corps. They included 5 tank divisions (2, 4, 5, 10, 21), 13 motorized rifle divisions (2, 3, 19, 20, 27, 42, 33, 34, 38, 81, 85, 245, 270), 4 airborne divisions (7, 76, 98, 106), 6 Machine gun-artillery divisions (18, 122, 127, 128, 129, 130), 5 artillery divisions (34 and others), 7 district training centers, 10 motorized rifle brigades (7, 15, 27, 33, 74, 79, 136, 138, 200, 205), 3 airborne assault brigades. (11, 31, 83), 7 GRU Spetsnaz brigades, 18 separate artillery brigades, 14 tactical missile brigades (OTR-21 Tochka), 5 anti-tank artillery brigades, 3 anti-tank artillery regiments, 19 anti-aircraft missile brigades in the Air Defense of the Ground Forces. 2 tank and 13 motorized rifle divisions, 1 high-power artillery brigade, 4 artillery, 6 motorized rifle and 2 tank brigades were cadre. The Strategic Missile Forces were concentrated in 3 missile armies with 635 SPUs (112 R-36M, 150 RS-18, 12 RS-22, 325 RS-12M, 36 Topol-M2) with 2,500 nuclear warheads. In total, the Strategic Missile Forces had 15 missile divisions. The Air Force consisted of 5 Air Force and Air Defense Armies, including 49 aviation regiments and 9 military transport regiments. Expenditures on R&D increased. In 2002, 27 billion rubles more was spent than in the previous year. The troops began to form units of constant readiness staffed by contract servicemen. A new silo-based and mobile intercontinental ballistic missile (ICBM) RT-2PM2 Topol-M was adopted. The average annual flight time in the Air Force increased from 14 to 40 hours in the period 2001-2006. The call sign of the communication channel on the frequency of 4625 kHz changed from UVB-76 to MDZhB.
