= Siberian Military District =

Military district of the Russian Empire and Soviet Union

- Сибирский военный округ
- Boundaries of the district in 1989
- Active: 1864–2010
- Country: Russian Empire (to 1918); Soviet Union (to 1991); Russia
- Branch: Russian Ground Forces
- Type: Military district
- Part of: Ministry of Defence
- Headquarters: Novosibirsk
- Decorations: Order of Lenin

Insignia
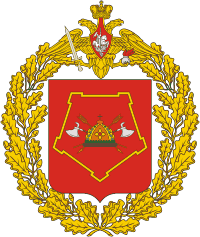
- District emblem

The Siberian Military District was a military district of the Russian Ground Forces. The district was originally formed as a military district of the Russian Empire in 1864. In 1924 it was reformed in the Red Army. After the end of World War II the district was split into the Western and Eastern Siberian Military Districts. In 1956 the western district's name was changed back to Siberian Military District, and in 1998 the Transbaikal Military District was merged into it. In 2010 it was divided between the two newly formed Central and Eastern Military Districts.

== History ==
The Siberian Military District was originally formed in 1864, as the Western Siberian Military District, being one of the ten original military districts of the Russian Empire. It was renamed the Omsk Military District in 1882, until renamed again Western Siberian Military District in 1918-1919.

The Siberian Military District was created in June 1924 with the consolidation of the Western, Central and Eastern Siberian Military Districts, which had become the Imperial Military Districts in the area. In June 1941 the District was host to the 24th Army, under Lieutenant General Stepan Kalinin, which comprised two Rifle Corps, the 52nd and 53rd. The 52nd, with its headquarters in Novosibirsk along with the 133rd Rifle Division, additionally had the 166th Rifle Division at Barabinsk and the 178th Rifle Division at Omsk. The 53rd Rifle Corps at Krasnoyarsk, where the 119th Rifle Division was stationed, also included the 107th Rifle Division at Barnaul and the 91st Rifle Division at Achinsk.

Among the many, many formations the district raised during the Second World War was the 75th Cavalry Division, formed in September and October 1941.

Immediately after the end of World War II, on July 9, 1945, to facilitate the demobilisation process, the Siberian Military District was divided into the Western and Eastern Siberian Military Districts.

- The Western Siberian Military District was headquartered at Novosibirsk, and created from HQ 8th Army, covered the Tyumen Oblast, the Omsk Oblast, Novosibirsk, the Tomsk Oblast, the Kemerovo Oblast and Altay.
- The Eastern Siberian District was located at Irkutsk and created from HQ 50th Army. The Eastern Siberian District was disbanded in 1953 with its region being split between the Western Siberian District and the Transbaikal Military District.

On January 4, 1956 the Western Siberian Military District was again renamed the Siberian Military District.

In 1959 the 74th Temryukskaya Red Banner Motor Rifle Division (74-я мотострелковая Темрюкская Краснознамённая дивизия) (в/ч 77087) at Krasnoyarsk was disbanded, with two units joining the 85th Motor Rifle Division.

In 1968 the 33rd Army Corps was transferred into the district from the Turkestan Military District, establishing its headquarters at Kemerovo. The 13th Motor Rifle Division at Biysk was assigned to it. Among the mobilisation divisions formed in the district from the late 1970s was the 167th Motor Rifle Division, whose equipment storage area was co-located with the barracks of the 13th MRD.

The 242nd Motor Rifle Division was established at Abakan in 1972.

In 1974 for their great contributions to the cause of strengthening the defence of the Soviet State and its armed protection, successes in combat and political training, the Transbaikal Military District was rewarded with the Order of Lenin, and the Siberian Military District with the Order of the Red Banner.

The 33rd Army Corps disbanded in July 1991 and its personnel and assets were absorbed by the arriving 28th Army Corps from Czechoslovakia. General Major Nikolai Loktionov remained in command of the merged formation, having been appointed as the 33rd Army Corps commander in June 1991.

In August 1992, the 21st Motor Rifle Division, withdrawn from the 2nd Guards Tank Army in East Germany, was moved to Omsk. In October 1992, the 300th Guards Parachute Regiment of the 98th Guards Airborne Division at Kishinev in the Odessa Military District was split out of the division and sent to Abakan. In the city of Abakan, four years later, the 300th Guards Parachute Regiment was reorganised as the 100th independent Guards Airborne Brigade, but was then disbanded circa 1998.

In 1998, seven years after the fall of the Soviet Union, the District absorbed most of the territory and responsibilities of the former Transbaikal Military District, retaining the name Siberian Military District, but on their merger gave up the vast Sakha Republic (also known as Yakutia) to the expanded Far Eastern Military District.

== District forces in 1990 ==
The Siberian Military District has traditionally been a source for creating new wartime reserves, as demonstrated by the crucial role the Siberian rifle divisions have played in the Battle of Moscow during the Second World War. For that reason by the end of the Cold War the Siberian MD's land forces were modest by Soviet standards and air forces were non-existent. The 33rd Guards Berlislavsko-Khinganskaya, twice awarded the Order of the Red Banner and awarded the Order of Suvorov Strategic Missile Army (33-я гвардейская ракетная Бериславско-Хинганская дважды Краснознамённая, ордена Суворова армия) of the Strategic Rocket Forces with its HQ in Omsk and the 14th independent Red Banner Air Defence Army of the Air Defence Forces with its headquarters in Novosibirsk were based in the Siberian Military District's area of responsibility, but were independent operational formations.

=== Formations and units under direct district subordination ===
District Command and Headquarters (Управление командующего и штаб) - Novosibirsk

- 373rd Separate Staff Security and Supply Battalion (373-й отдельный батальон охраны и обеспечения штаба) - Novosibirsk
- 67th Separate Spetsnaz Brigade (67-я отдельная бригада специального назначения) - Berdsk (GRU formation operationally attached to the district)
- 172nd Radio-technical Brigade OsNaz (172-я радиотехническая бригада ОсНаз) - Biysk (GRU formation operationally attached to the district)
- 233rd Radio-electronic Warfare Regiment (233-й полк РЭБ) - Shilovo village (EW Directorate of the General Staff's (Управление РЭБ ГШ СССР) unit operationally attached to the district)
- 103rd Separate Signals Brigade (103-я отдельная бригада связи) - Yagunovo village
- 135th Separate Tallinskaya, awarded the Order of the Red Star Signals Brigade (135-я отдельная Таллинская ордена Красной звезды бригада связи) - Kochenyovo village
- 1310th Separate Troposphere Signals Battalion (1310-й отдельный батальон тропосферной связи) - Kyzyl
- 130th Separate Landing Assault Brigade [cadred] (130-я отдельная десантно-штурмовая бригада (кадра)) - Abakan
- 485th Separate Motor Rifle Regiment (485-й отдельный мотострелковый полк) - Aktash village
- 6th Guards SSM Brigade (6-я гвардейская ракетная бригада) - Taksino village
- 1168th Separate SSM (or possibly MLRS) Battalion (1168-й отдельный ракетный дивизион) - Pashino village
- 351st High Power Artillery Brigade (351-я артиллерийская бригада большой мощности) - Shilovo village
- 520th Gun Artillery Brigade (520-я пушечная артиллерийская бригада) - Krasnoyarsk
- 314th Separate Radio-technical Regiment (314-й отдельный радиотехнический полк) - Krasnoyarsk
- 247th Separate Radio-technical Battalion (247-й отдельный радиотехнический батальон) - Taskino village
- 11th Chemical Defence Brigade (11-я бригада химической защиты) - Topchikha village
- 40th Chemical Defence Brigade (40-я бригада химической защиты) - Pospelikha village
- 430th Separate Sapper Engineer Battalion (430-й отдельный инженерно-сапёрный батальон) - Pospelikha village
- 309th Pontoon Bridging Regiment (309-й понтонно-мостовой полк) - Mochishte village
- 587th Separate Pontoon Bridging Battalion (587-й отдельный понтонно-мостовой батальон) - Achinsk
- 84th Separate Overhaul and Complex Repair and Maintenance Battalion (84-й отдельный ремонтно-восстановительный батальон комплексного ремонта) - Shilovo village
- 12th Automobile [Transport] Brigade (Automotive Troops) (12-я автомобильная бригада) - Mochishte village
- 48th Automobile [Transport] Brigade (Automotive Troops)(48-я автомобильная бригада) - Biysk
- Separate Heavy Vehicle Automobile [Transport] Battalion (Automotive Troops)(Отдельный автомобильный батальон тяжёлых машин) - Abakan
- 51st Brigade for Material Support (51-я бригада материального обеспечения) - Barnaul
- 121st Brigade for Material Support (121-я бригада материального обеспечения) - Shilovo village
- 250th Pipeline Brigade (250-я трубопроводная бригада) - Kamarchaga village
- 465th District Training Center (465-й окружной учебный центр) - Omsk

=== Divisions under direct district subordination ===
- 33rd Army Corps (33-й армейский корпус) - Kemerovo
  - 5349th Weaponry and Equipment Storage Base (5352-я БХВТ) in Biysk since 1989. Previously the 1010th Territorial Training Center (1010-й территориальный учебный центр) itself formed on the base of the 167th Motor Rifle Division [cadred] (167-я мотострелковая дивизия (кадра)) in 1987.
  - 5351st Weaponry and Equipment Storage Base (5351-я БХВТ) in Biysk since 1989. Previously the 13th Motor Rifle Division. In July 1992 took over the traditions, honors and awards from the disbanded 23rd Guards Motor Rifle Division, and was renamed 13th Guards Motorised Rifle Division.
  - 5352nd Weaponry and Equipment Storage Base (5352-я БХВТ) in Omsk since 1989. Previously the 62nd Motor Rifle Division (62-я мотострелковая дивизия) - Itatka village
- 85th Leningradsko-Pavlovskaya Red Banner Motor Rifle Division (85-я мотострелковая Ленинградско-Павловская Краснознамённая дивизия) - Novosibirsk (the sole active combat division in the district)
- 5350th Weaponry and Equipment Storage Base (5350-я БХВТ) since Dec. 1, 1989. Previously the 242nd Motor Rifle Division in Abakan under the 33rd Army Corps
- 95th Motor Rifle Division [cadred] (95-я мотострелковая дивизия (кадра)) - Stepnoy village
- 190th Motor Rifle Division [cadred] (190-я мотострелковая дивизия (кадра)) - Berdsk
- 218th Motor Rifle Division [cadred] (218-я мотострелковая дивизия (кадра)) - Biysk
- 227th Motor Rifle Division [cadred] (227-я мотострелковая дивизия (кадра)) - Svetliy village
- 261st Motor Rifle Division [cadred] (261-я мотострелковая дивизия (кадра)) - Stepnoy village
- 241st Rear Area Security Division [cadred] (241-я дивизия охраны тыла (кадра)) - Novosibirsk
- 84th Deep Reserve Artillery Division (84-я артиллерийская запасная дивизия) - Taskino village
- 67th Deep Reserve Tank Division [cadred] (67-я запасная танковая дивизия (кадра)) - Shilovo village
- 68th Deep Reserve Tank Division [cadred] (68-я запасная танковая дивизия (кадра)) - Topchikha village
- 71st Deep Reserve Tank Division [cadred] (71-я запасная танковая дивизия (кадра)) - Omsk

=== Air Forces of the Siberian Military District ===
Air Forces of the Siberian Military District (ВВС Сибирского военного округа) - Novosibirsk

- 137th Separate Composite Aviation Squadron (137-я отдельная смешанная авиационная эскадрилья) - Tolmachevo Airport, Novosibirsk (sometimes also listed as Tolmachevo - Ob) - Il-22, An-12, An-26, An-24, Mi-8 (under direct district HQ control)
- Barnaul Higher Military Aviation School of Pilots named after Chief marshal of aviation K. A. Vershinin (Барнаульское высшее военное авиационное училище лётчиков имени Главного Маршала авиации К. А. Вершинина) - Barnaul
  - 96th Training Air Regiment (96-й учебный авиационный полк) - Kamen-na-Obi - MiG-21
  - 59th Training Air Regiment (59-й учебный авиационный полк) - Slavgorod, based at two airfields called North (Северный) and South (Южный) - MiG-21, L-29
  - 44th Training Air Regiment (44-й учебный авиационный полк) - Panfilovo - Panfilovo - L-39, Mi-8
- Irkutsk Higher Engineer School of Military Aviation awarded the Order of the Red Star, named after the 50th Anniversary of the Komsomol (Иркутское высшее военное авиационное инженерное ордена Красной Звезды училище имени 50-летия ВЛКСМ) - Irkutsk
- Achinsk Military Aviation Technical School (Ачинское военное авиационно-техническое училище) - Achinsk
- Krasnoyarsk Military Aviation School for Specialists (Красноярская военно-авиационная школа специальных служб) - Krasnoyarsk
- Rubtsovsk Military Aviation School for Mechanics (Рубцовская военная авиационная школа механиков) - Rubtsovsk
- Kansk School for On-Board Signals and Gunner Airmen (Канская школа воздушных стрелков-радистов) - Kansk

== District forces c. 2009–2010 ==
Siberian Military District 1998–2010

The 41st Army was formed from the headquarters of the former Siberian Military District at Novosibirsk while the new district’s headquarters were established at Chita (the former Transbaikal MD HQ). It is likely safe to assume that the 41st Army controls all the field formations of the previous Siberian Military District.

The IISS listed the district in 2006 as having a total of one tank, two motor-rifle and one machine-gun artillery divisions, two motor-rifle and one air assault brigades. The 2nd Guards Tank Division, previously active in Mongolia with the 39th Army, disbanded in 2005 having been stationed at Strugi Mirnaya/Bezrechnaya (ru:Безречная), 50 43 25N, 116 10 35E) in Chita Oblast. Also, while the 21st 'Tagenrog' Motor Rifle Division, withdrawn from Germany to the former Siberian Military District, was apparently partially re-equipped with the T-90 MBT in the mid-1990s, in 2000 it was apparently disbanded.

The 29th Army at Ulan-Ude was seemingly disbanded in the course of 2007.

- District troops
  - 11th Air Assault Brigade (498th, 499th Battalions, 500th Btn recently disbanded)
  - 24th Spetsnaz Brigade (Irkutsk; formerly at Kykhta / Ulan Ude)
  - 120th Artillery Brigade (Chistye Klyuchi, Shelekhov) (8 BM-27 Uragan MRL, 18 152 mm howitzer 2A65)
  - 232nd Multiple Rocket Launcher Brigade (Chistye Klyuchi, Shelekhov)(18 BM-27 Uragan MRL)
  - 7018th Base for Storage of Rocket and Artillery Equipment (Drovyanaya)
  - 7019th Base for Storage of Rocket and Artillery Equipment (Chistye Klyuchi, Shelekhov) – former 12th Artillery Division
  - 104th Base for Storage of Weapons and Equipment (VKhVT) (Aleysk) (85th MRB)
  - other units
- 36th Army, Ulan Ude (formerly Borzya, moved February 2009)
  - 5th Separate Guards Tank Brigade (Divizionnaya, Ulan Ude region) (former 5th Guards Tank Division)
  - 36th Guards Independent Motor Rifle Brigade (Borzya) (former 131st Motor Rifle Division, Sretensk)
  - 37th Guards Independent Motor Rifle Brigade (Kyakhta) (former 6 VKhVT, and 245th Motor Rifle Division)
  - 200th Artillery Brigade (Drovyanaya) (8 BM-27 Uragan MRL, 18 152 mm howitzer 2A65, 6 100 mm МТ-12 anti-tank guns, 9P149 "Shturm-С" – 18)
- 41st Army, Novosibirsk
  - 32nd Independent Motor Rifle Brigade, (Novosibirsk) (former 85th Motor Rifle Division)
  - 35th Separate Guards Motor Rifle Brigade (former 122nd MRD) (Aleysk) (The 5th Guards Tank Corps was originally part of the USSR 6th Guards Tank Army and was transferred as part of 6th Guards Tank Army to the Transbaikal Military District in preparation for the Soviet invasion of Manchuria in August 1945. The 5th Guards Tank Corps took part in this offensive and afterwards, soon after the Japanese surrender on 2 September 1945, was reorganised as the 5th Guards Tank Division. In 1957, the 5th Guards Tank Division (first formation) was reorganised as the 122nd Guards Motor Rifle Division.)
  - 74th Guards Motor Rifle Brigade, Yurga (Constant readiness)
  - 103rd Base for Storage of Weapons and Equipment (Shilov, Novosibirsk Oblast) (84th MR Bde; formed from former 85th MRD)

=== Subordinate units ===
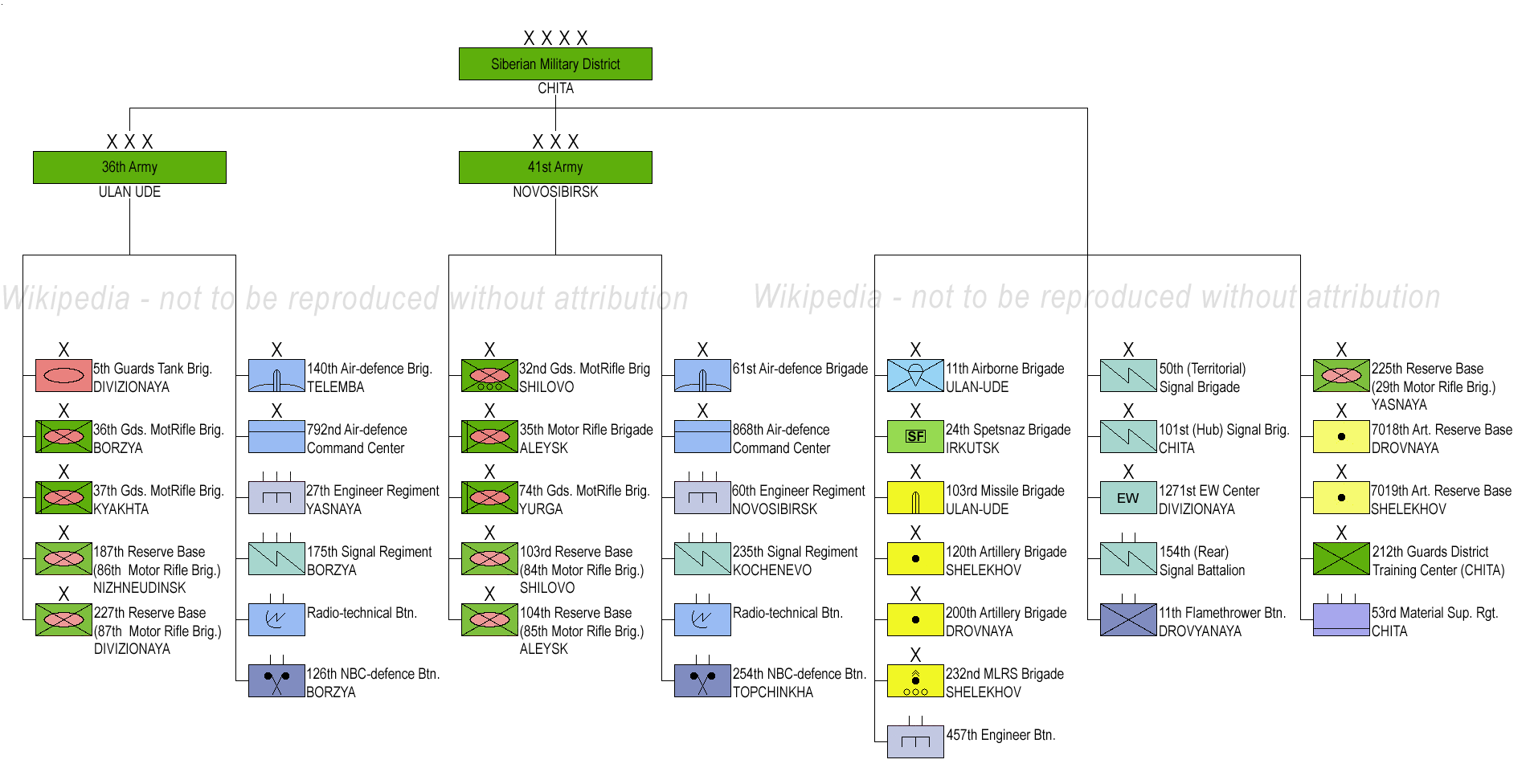
Structure and units of the Siberian Military District 2010

Order of Lenin Siberian Military District 2010:

- Combat formations:
  - 36th Army, Ulan Ude
    - 5th Guards Independent Tank Brigade "Don-Budapest", in Divizionaya equipped with T-90
    - 36th Guards Independent Motor-Rifle Brigade "Lozovskaya", in Borzya equipped with BMP-3 and T-72
    - 37th Guards Independent Motor-Rifle Brigade "Tachinskaya", in Kyakhta equipped with BMP
    - 187th Reserve Base (86th Independent Motor-Rifle Brigade) in Nizhneudinsk
    - 227th Reserve Base (87th Independent Motor-Rifle Brigade) in Divizionaya
  - 41st Army, Novosibirsk
    - 32nd Independent Motor-Rifle Brigade "Leningrad-Pavlovskaya", in Shilovo equipped with BTR and T-90
    - 35th Separate Guards Motor Rifle Brigade "Volgograd-Kiev", in Aleysk equipped with BMP-2 and T-72
    - 74th Guards Independent Motor-Rifle Brigade "Zvenigorod-Berlin", in Yurga equipped with BMP-3 and T-72
    - 103rd Reserve Base (84th Independent Motor-Rifle Brigade), in Shilovo
    - 104th Reserve Base (85th Independent Motor-Rifle Brigade), in Aleysk
    - 225th Reserve Base (29th Independent Motor-Rifle Brigade), in Yasnaya
  - 11th Independent Airborne Brigade, in Sosnovyy Bor, Ulan-Ude – formed 1968
  - 24th Spetsnaz Brigade, in Irkutsk
  - 212th Guards District Training Center, in Chita
- Missile and Artillery formations:
  - 103rd Rocket Brigade in Ulan-Ude (SSM)
  - 232nd MLRS Brigade in Shelekhov
  - 120th Artillery Brigade in Shelekhov
  - 200th Artillery Brigade in Drovnaya
  - 7018th Artillery Reserve Base in Drovnaya
  - 7019th Artillery Reserve Base in Shelekhov
- Air-defence formations:
  - 36th Army
    - 140th Air-defence Missile Brigade in Telemba
    - 792nd Air-defence Command Center
  - 41st Army
    - 61st Air-defence Missile Brigade
    - 868th Air-defence Command Center
- Engineering formations:
  - 27th Engineer Regiment in Yasnaya (36th Army)
  - 60th Engineer Regiment in Novosibirsk (41st Army)
  - 457th Independent Engineer Battalion
- NBC-defence formations:
  - 11th Independent Flamethrower Battalion in Drovyanaya
  - 126th Independent NBC-defence Battalion in Borzya (36th Army)
  - 254th Independent NBC-defence Battalion in Topchinkha (41st Army)
- Signal formations:
  - 50th (Territorial) Signal Brigade
  - 101st (Communications Hub) Signal Brigade "Khinganskaya" in Chita
  - 1271st Electronic Warfare Center in Divizionaya
  - 175th Independent Signal Regiment in Borzya (36th Army)
  - 235th Independent Signal Regiment in Kochenevo (41st Army)
  - 154th Independent (Rear) Signal Battalion
- Logistic formations:
  - 53rd Material Support Regiment in Chita

== Commanders ==
=== West Siberian MD ===
- Infantry General Alexander Osipovich Dyugamel; (April 1865 - October 1866)
- Infantry General Alexander Petrovich Khrushchev; (October 1866 - January 1875)
- Infantry General Nikolai Gennadievich Kaznakov; (January 1875 - February 1881)
- Lieutenant General Grigory Vasilyevich Mescherinov (February 1881 - May 1882).

=== Omsk MD ===
- General of Infantry Kolpakovsky, Gerasim Alekseevich; (May 1882 - June 1889)
- Lieutenant General Babkov, Ivan Fedorovich (temporarily acting); (June - October 1889)
- General of the Cavalry Taube, Maxim Antonovich; (October 1889 - May 1899)

=== Siberian MD ===
- General of the Cavalry Taube, Maxim Antonovich; (May 1899 - July 1900)
- Lieutenant General Aleksander F. Karpov (July 1900 - April 1901)
- Lieutenant General Nikolay N. Sukhotin (April 1901 - April 1906)

=== Omsk MD ===
- Lieutenant General Ivan Nadarov; (April 1906 - June 1908)
- General of the cavalry Schmitt, Evgeny Ottovich; (August 1908 - April 1916)
- General of the Cavalry Nikolai Alexandrovich Sukhomlinov; (April 1916 - March 1917)
- Major General Dumbadze, Samson Antonovich; (March 1917)
- Major General G.V. Grigoriev; (March - July 1917)
- Lieutenant General Taube, Alexander Alexandrovich; (July 1917)
- Colonel MP Predinsky; (July - August 1917) -
- Ensign P. N. Polovnikov; (August - November 1917)
- Captain M. I. Telitsyn; (November 1917 - May 1918)
- Major General Aleksei Matkovsky (December 1918 - 1919).

=== Siberian MD ===
- Sergei Mrachkovsky: 1922-1923
- Nikolay Petin: Jan-Nov 1923
- Yan Gaylit: 1923-1924
- Robert Eideman: 1924-1925
- Mikhail Lashevich: Feb-Nov 1925
- Nikolay Petin: 1925-1928
- Nikolay Kuibyshev: 1928-1930
- Mikhail Lewandowski: 1930-1933
- Komkor Yan Gaylit: 1933-1937
- Komandarm 2nd rank Pavel Dybenko (May 1937 - July 1937)
- Komkor Maksim Antoniuk (July 1937 - July 1938)
- General Lieutenant Stepan Kalinin (July 1938 - July 1941)
- General Lieutenant Nikifor Medvedev (Jan 1942 - April 1944) (de facto since July 1941)

=== Eastern Siberian MD ===
- Colonel General Prokofy Romanenko (July 1945 - February 1947)
- General of the Army Georgy Zakharov (February 1947 - April 1950)
- Colonel-General Dmitry Gusev (April 1950 - March 1951)
- Colonel General Ivan Boldin (March 1951 - June 1953)

=== Western Siberian MD ===
- Lieutenant General Vladimir Kurdyumov (April 1944 – October 1946)
- General of the Army Andrei Yeremenko (October 1946 – November 1953)
- Colonel General Nikolai Pukhov (November 1953 – January 1956) (former commander of 13th Army)

=== Siberian MD ===
- Colonel General Nikolai Pukhov (January 1956 – July 1957) (district renamed)
- Colonel General Pyotr Koshevoy (July 1957 – April 1960)
- Colonel General Gleb Baklonov (May 1960 – 1964)
- Colonel General Semion Ivanov (1964 – 1968)
- Colonel General Vladimir Tolubko (1968 – May 1969)
- Colonel General Mikhail Homulo (May 1969 – December 1978)
- Colonel General Boris Snetkov (January 1979 – November 1981)
- Colonel General Nikolai Popov (November 1981 – September 1984)
- Colonel General Vladimir Vostrov (September 1984 – February 1986)
- Colonel General Nikolai Kalinin (February 1986 – August 1987)
- Colonel General Boris Pyankov (April 1988 – August 1991)
- Lieutenant General Viktor Koplov (с. September 1991 – 1997)
- Colonel General Grigory Kasperovich (1997 - December 1998)
- Colonel General Nikolai Kormiltsev (December 1998 – March 2001)
- Colonel General Vladimir Boldyrev (May 2001 – December 2002)
- Colonel General Nikolai Makarov (December 2002 – April 2007)
- Colonel General Alexander Postnikov (April 2007 – January 2010)
- Lieutenant General Vladimir Chirkin (January – June 2010)
