= 1997 Russian military reform =

Military reform in the Russian Federation in 1997-1999 (Russian: Военная реформа в РФ (1997—1999)) were set of measures to reform the Russian Armed Forces.

The collapse of the Soviet Union led to the destruction of the Soviet Armed Forces, divided between the former Soviet republics. In addition to the old problems of the Soviet Armed Forces, inherited by the Russian Armed Forces, there were also problems of the discrepancy between the size of the armed forces and the economic capabilities of the Russian state, and, in addition, the emerging demographic crisis posed an edge problem of staffing military units. Defense priorities and potential adversaries changed, which made the Soviet model of the army no longer relevant. The solution to these issues became the main one in the process of reforming the Armed Forces. Optimization of the organizational and staffing structure, reduction of the number of the armed forces, introduction of contract service and streamlining of financing became the main measures taken by the government and the Ministry of Defense during the reform.

== Background ==
By presidential decree of May 7, 1992, the Russian Armed Forces and the Ministry of Defense of sovereign Russia were created.

The reform was preceded by a preparatory period of 1992-1996, which defined the main ways of working on improving the country's armed forces for the top leadership. There was no serious reform during these years. The military leadership and the president withdrew from resolving pressing issues.

It was characterized primarily by the division of the armed forces between the republics of the former USSR and the withdrawal of troops from the Warsaw Pact countries (WGF, Northern Group of Forces, Central Group of Forces), the former Baltic Military District (which became the North Western Group of Forces) and Mongolia (39th Army (Soviet Union) and the Soviet troops in Mongolia). In addition, the First Chechen War exposed all the accumulated problems very clearly, forcing society and the authorities to pay close attention to the issue of reforming the Armed Forces.

The need for a radical reform of the armed forces had already matured under Mikhail Gorbachev. The army's problems were sharply exacerbated by the ill-considered and hasty withdrawal of troops, which added new difficulties to the old ones. The rate of housing construction lagged far behind the rate of troop withdrawal. In Russia, only slightly more than 10% of the required number of apartments were built.

...The return of many Russian officers with their families from Europe and the former Soviet republics further increased the burden on the military structure, preventing its normal functioning... The colossal task of redeploying troops, coupled with a huge shortage of housing and infrastructure elements, had to be solved simultaneously with the creation of new groups. But there was significant uncertainty about the nature of the threats and who could be considered allies and who could not. This had the most negative impact on the morale of the people and served as an important reason for the collapse of the army as a single organism...

—

During this period, there was no noticeable reform of the armed forces. The programs were disrupted, and the mafia profited from the theft of military property. For example, the State Program for the Withdrawal of Russian Troops from the Territories of Other States, Their Deployment and Development on the Territory of Russia, approved by the Decree of the president of Russia of June 24, 1993, was not implemented. It provided for the construction of 126.7 thousand apartments, over 580 social and cultural facilities, about 460 barracks and over 2,300 storage facilities for equipment, weapons and material and technical resources. It was planned to allocate 427.8 billion rubles from the federal budget to fulfill the objectives of the Program. The funds largely fell into the hands of the mafia or were spent ineffectively. Employees of the Ministry of Defense awarded contracts for the construction of barracks, training grounds, housing, storage facilities, and social facilities to one-day firms, including those created by their former colleagues, after which the money received disappeared in an unknown direction.

Under the influence of public criticism and to increase his rating before the 1996 presidential election, president Yeltsin turned his attention to the problem and on May 16, 1996, presidential decree No. 722 "On the transition to the staffing of privates and sergeants of the Armed Forces and other troops of the Russian Federation on a professional basis" was issued. This decree gave impetus to the formal legal beginning of contract service in the Russian Armed Forces.

Only by 1997 was a clear strategy for work on bringing the armed forces out of the protracted crisis defined. Obstacles to reform were created by the traditionalist-minded generals headed by the Ministers of Defense Pavel Grachev and Igor Rodionov, who thought in terms of the Cold War. In addition, the reform work was hampered by the rigid military-bureaucratic structure inherited from the Soviet Ministry of Defense. The conservative generals managed to convince the leadership not to transform the Ministry of Defense into a purely civilian administrative-political governing body with the transfer of all functions for commanding the troops to the General Staff.

== Progress of reforms ==
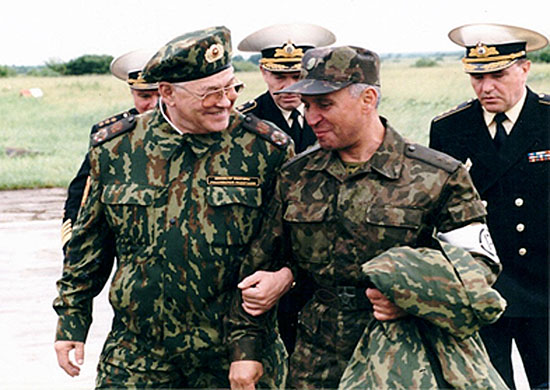
Lieutenant General Nikolai Makarov with the minister of defense, Marshal Igor Sergeyev (left) at the Zapad-99 exercises. 1999

The reform was initiated by the Decree of President Boris Yeltsin "On measures to ensure military construction in the Russian Federation" dated November 26, 1996. In addition, on May 22, 1997, Igor Sergeyev was appointed Minister of Defense, and Anatoly Kvashnin was appointed Chief of the General Staff, and they were to carry out the reform under their leadership. Its main directions were specified in the Decree of the President of Russia No. 725c "On priority measures to reform the Armed Forces of the Russian Federation and improve their structure" dated July 16, 1997.

The following were created under the Defense Council of Russia: the Commission on Military Construction, chaired by Prime Minister Viktor Chernomyrdin, and the Commission on Financial and Economic Support for Military Reform, chaired by First Deputy Prime Minister and Finance Minister Anatoly Chubais, whose task was to develop conceptual and theoretical provisions and practical measures for military reform.

A decision was made to reduce the authorized strength of the armed forces by January 1, 1999, from 1.7 million to 1.2 million military personnel and from 600,000 to 300,000 civilian personnel. The actual list strength of the Russian armed forces in 1997 was in the range of 1.2-1.3 million military personnel.

The military construction complex, road construction units, and military trade were to be removed from the structure. By the end of 1997, 57 military units and institutions were disbanded.

The Strategic Rocket Forces, the Russian Space Forces, and the Missile and Space Defense Forces (previously, the Space Forces were part of the Air Defense Forces) were merged, thus creating a new type of troops. This made it possible to eliminate duplicate command structures and improve the information acquisition system. Information began to flow from the space and ground echelons of the missile attack warning systems, bypassing intermediate links, directly to the Central Command Post of the Strategic Missile Forces, which reduced the time for decision-making in a hypothetical critical situation.

In 1997, a number of conservative-minded military men, including former defense minister Igor Rodionov and General Lev Rokhlin, went into radical opposition to Yeltsin, accusing him of deliberately collapsing the Russian Armed Forces. They established the Movement in Support of the Army. According to some evidence, Rokhlin was gathering military personnel to organize a coup against the president and was hatching plans for an armed "march on the Kremlin". In July 1997, Russian President Boris Yeltsin spoke harshly about the general's opposition activities: "We will sweep away the Rokhlins with their anti-constructive actions. We don't need such assistants". In July 1998, Rokhlin was found murdered at his own dacha. According to the official version, his wife shot him while he was sleeping.

In accordance with presidential decree of August 28, 1997, the State Military Inspectorate was created as part of his administration to monitor the situation in the armed forces. In 1998, the Air Defense Forces were transferred to the Air Force. The new structure of the Russian Air Force with integrated air defense was approved on January 27, 1998. A new Air Force General Command was formed with 950 personnel (78% - military personnel). By January 1, 1999, the total number of the Air Force was 318 thousand people (41,350 servicemen were dismissed). By March 1998, the Commander-in-Chief's Office of the reformed Air Force was created in Zheleznodorozhny. The capabilities of the air defense were weakened. In the Moscow Air Defence District, the number of servicemen decreased by 2.3 times, out of 10 units, 4 remained. In total, 580 units were disbanded, 134 units were reformed, more than 20 airfields and 310 military towns were freed up. During the year of reorganization, 600 thousand tons of material and technical resources and fuel and lubricants were transported.

In 1998, the Army Aviation was withdrawn from the Ground Forces and reassigned directly to the Chief of the General Staff.

On July 30, 1998, the president Yeltsin approved the "Fundamentals (Concept) of the State Policy of the Russian Federation on Military Development for the Period up to 2005". The document defined the level of military spending: 5.1% of GDP for all activities to ensure the country's security, including 3.5% of GDP for the country's defense. The number of military districts was reduced from eight to seven after the Transbaikal Military District was abolished. It was planned to create operational-strategic commands on their basis with the function of managing all types of combat arms in the entrusted territory. But for financial reasons, this was not implemented.

The transition to a four-branch structure of the armed forces was completed: ground forces, air forces, Strategic Missile Forces and the navy.

It was planned to leave 25 divisions (of which 4 were fully staffed), four army corps and seven Combined arms armies (see also List of Soviet armies), and to transform 26 divisions into weapons and military equipment storage bases (storage can also be rendered as "conservation," базу хранения военной техники (БХВТ)). The Russian Navy was least affected by the reform process. Its numbers were planned to be reduced to 200 thousand people. The president set the task of limiting defense spending to 3.5% of GDP. In June 1999, the Commission for the Preparation of Draft General Military Regulations of the Russian Armed Forces completed the preliminary study of the military regulations and in August of the same year sent them to the troops for study. The number of military educational institutions and research institutes was reduced by approximately half. By the beginning of 1999, a new Military doctrine of Russia was prepared.

== Results ==
The budget crisis of the spring of 1998, and then the collapse of August 17, dealt a heavy blow to the implementation of the reform at the very moment when it began to gain momentum. Since 1998, planned defense spending was cut from 82 billion to 38 billion rubles by the end of the year. Financial cuts primarily hit Research and development, the acquisition of weapons and equipment, and capital construction. The transition to contract military service (kontraktniki) was frozen. Exercises and military training effectively ceased.

The concept of the military organization of the Russian Federation, its composition and structure were defined. By 2000, the number of the armed forces personnel had decreased by 30% compared to 1997, and the military budget in real terms - by 50%. The fact that the reduction in funding outpaced the reduction in numbers put the army on the brink of a social explosion, which discredited the reform. One of the clear indicators of the results of the reform was the reduction in the staffing level of the Armed Forces. While the Russian Armed Fores had 2.341 million people on December 1, 1993, by 2000 it was already 1.2 million people.

== See also ==
- List of Soviet Army divisions 1989–1991 - list of divisions 1990/91 and 2006, spanning this period
- Conscription in Russia
