= 242nd Motor Rifle Division =

Motor rifle division of the Soviet military

- Active: 1972–1989
- Country: Soviet Union
- Branch: Soviet Army
- Type: Motorized infantry
- Garrison/HQ: Abakan

The 242nd Motor Rifle Division was a motorized infantry division of the Soviet Army. The division existed from 1972 to 1988 and was based in Abakan. The division became a storage base in 1989 and was disbanded in 2009.

== History ==
The 242nd Motor Rifle Division was activated in 1972 in Abakan as part of the Siberian Military District. In 1980, its 485th Motorized Rifle Regiment became independent and was transferred to Yurga, being replaced by the 192nd Motorized Rifle Regiment. The division became part of the 33rd Army Corps in 1985. During the Cold War, the division was maintained at 23% strength. On 1 December 1989, the division became the 5350th Weapons and Equipment Storage Base. In 1991, the storage base was transferred back into the Siberian Military District. The storage base was disbanded in 2009 as part of the Russian military reform.

== Composition ==
In 1988, the division included the following units. All units were based at Abakan unless noted.

- 192nd Motorized Rifle Regiment
- 486th Motorized Rifle Regiment (Chadan)
- 489th Motorized Rifle Regiment (Kyzyl)
- 164th Tank Regiment (Kyzyl)
- 7th Artillery Regiment (Kyzyl)
- 1326th Antiaircraft Artillery Regiment
- Separate Missile Battalion
- Separate Antitank Artillery Company
- 172nd Separate Reconnaissance Battalion
- 34th Separate Engineer-Sapper Battalion
- 312th Separate Communications Battalion
- Separate Chemical Defence Company
- Separate Equipment Maintenance and Recovery Battalion
- Separate Medical Battalion
- Separate Material Supply Battalion
