= Slavgorod (disambiguation) =

Slavgorod is a town in Altai Krai, Russia.

Slavgorod may also refer to:

- Slavgorod Urban Okrug, a municipal formation which the town of krai significance of Slavgorod in Altai Krai, Russia is incorporated as
- Slawharad (Slavgorod), a town in Mogilev Oblast, Belarus
- Slavhorod, an urban-type settlement in Dnipropetrovsk Oblast, Ukraine
- Slavgorod (air base), an air base in Altai Krai, Russia
