= Military districts of Russia =

Administrative divisions of the Russian armed forces

Military districts of Russia as of 2024 Leningrad Military District Eastern Military District Central Military District Southern Military District (incl. occupied territories of Ukraine) Moscow Military District

The military districts in Russia serve as administrative divisions for the Russian Armed Forces. Each has a headquarters administering the military formations within the Russian federal subjects that it includes.

Since March 1 2024, there are five military districts in Russia: Leningrad, Moscow, Central, Eastern, and Southern.

== List of military districts ==
=== 26 December 1991 ===
Military districts of Russia, 1992–1998

After the dissolution of the Soviet Union, Russia maintained a diminishing number of former Soviet Armed Forces military districts.

- Leningrad Military District
- Moscow Military District
- North Caucasus Military District
- Volga Military District
- Urals Military District
- Siberian Military District
- Transbaikal Military District
- Far East Military District
- Kaliningrad Special Region

=== 27 July 1998 ===
Military districts of Russia, 1998–2001

Military districts of Russia according to Decree of the President of Russia No. 900 on 27 July 1998.

- Leningrad Military District
- Moscow Military District
- North Caucasus Military District
- Volga Military District
- Urals Military District
- Siberian Military District
- Far East Military District
- Kaliningrad Special Region

=== 1 September 2001 ===
Military districts of Russia, 2001–2010

Volga Military District and Urals Military District was merged into the Volga-Urals Military District according to Decree of the President of Russia № 337с on 24 March 2001. The new district was to be with the boundaries of the Republic of Bashkortostan, Mari El, Republic of Mordovia, the Republic of Tatarstan, the Udmurtian Republic, the Chuvash Republic, the Kirov, Kurgan, Orenburg, Penza, Perm, Samara, Sverdlovsk, Tyumen, Ulyanovsk, and Chelyabinsk regions, the Komi-Permyak, Khanty-Mansi, and Yamal-Nemets autonomous areas.

Decree of the President of Russia No. 1764 (12 December 2008) changed names of regions after federal subjects mergers.

- Leningrad Military District
- Moscow Military District
- North Caucasus Military District
- Volga-Urals Military District
- Siberian Military District
- Far East Military District
- Kaliningrad Special Region

=== 1 September 2010 ===
Military districts of Russia as of 1 September 2010

Leningrad Military District, Moscow Military District and Kaliningrad Special Region were merged to form the Western Military District.

- Western Military District
- North Caucasus Military District
- Volga-Urals Military District
- Siberian Military District
- Far East Military District

=== 1 December 2010 ===
Military districts of Russia as of 1 December 2010

Since 1 December 2010, all military districts except the Western Military District had been replaced by three larger districts, based on recommendations of the 2008 Russian military reforms. The Central Military District was formed from a merger of the Volga-Urals Military District and most of the Siberian Military District, with the remainder (Buryatia and Zabaykalsky Krai) transferred to the Far East Military District to form the Eastern Military District. The North Caucasus Military District was replaced with the Southern Military District. The reform was according to Decree of the President of Russia No. 1144 on 20 September 2010.

- Western Military District with headquarters in Saint Petersburg
- Southern Military District with headquarters in Rostov-on-Don
- Central Military District with headquarters in Ekaterinburg
- Eastern Military District with headquarters in Khabarovsk

=== 2 April 2014 ===
Military districts of Russia as of 2 April 2014

The Southern Military District was enlarged to include disputed territories of the Republic of Crimea and Sevastopol following the 2014 Russian annexation of Crimea.

=== 15 December 2014 ===
Military districts of Russia as of 2016

On 15 December 2014, the Northern Fleet of the Russian Navy was removed from the Western Military District and the boundaries of its jurisdiction expanded to form the Northern Fleet Joint Strategic Command. The new military command included Murmansk Oblast, Arkhangelsk Oblast, and numerous Russian islands in the Arctic Ocean.

=== 1 January 2021 ===
The Northern Fleet Joint Strategic Command was the only military command to be transformed into a fully fledged military district, according to President Vladimir Putin's Decree of 5 June 2020. Since 1 January 2021, the Northern Fleet has held the status of a military district, and its joint strategic command has become the Northern Military District.

=== 2 February 2023 ===
Southern military district was expanded to include the occupied parts of Donetsk Republic, Luhansk Republic, Zaporizhzhia Oblast and Kherson Oblast.

=== 2 June 2023 ===
Russian authorities announced that the Moscow and Leningrad Military Districts would be reactivated in the course of 2023. It was also announced that a subordinate branch of the Black Sea Fleet in the Sea of Azov would be established.

=== 1 March 2024 ===
Since March 1 2024, the Leningrad and Moscow military districts were re-established in place of the Western Military District.

Military districts of Russia as of 2024

== See also ==
- Military districts of the Russian Empire
- Military districts of the Soviet Union
