= Barnaul Higher Military Aviation School of Pilots =

Barnaul Higher Military Aviation School for Pilots named after Chief Marshal of Aviation K. A. Vershinin Barnaul VVAUL
- Active: 1966–99
- Garrison/HQ: Barnaul, Altai Krai, Russia
- Website: http://www.vaul.ru/

The Barnaul Higher Military Aviation School for Pilots named after Chief Marshal of Aviation K. A. Vershinin (Barnaul VVAUL) (Барнаульское высшее военное авиационное училище летчиков им. Главного Маршала авиации К.А. Вершинина (БВВАУЛ))- was a flying training flight school of the Soviet Air Forces in the city of Barnaul (Altai Krai). It formed part of the Air Forces of the Siberian Military District.

== History of creation ==
The school was established on the basis of the Decree of the Council of Ministers of the Soviet Union of August 18, 1966, to train front-line aviation (bomber, fighter, fighter-bomber aviation, and ground attack aviation pilots.

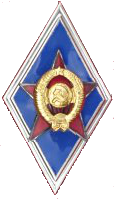
Soviet Armed Forces Badge for graduating from a military educational institution – higher military schools

The 44th Training Aviation Regiment (UAP) was based at Panfilovo (st. Kalmanka), the 96th UAP – city of Kamen-on-Obi, and the 59th UAP at Slavgorod.

By the Decree of the Council of Ministers of the USSR of April 15, 1974, and the order of the Minister of Defense of the USSR of April 30, 1974, to perpetuate the memory of the outstanding Soviet military leader Chief Marshal of Aviation Konstantin Vershinin, the school was named after him. From this period, the school began to be called: "Barnaul Higher Military Aviation School for Pilots named after Chief Marshal of Aviation K. A. Vershinin."

The school was disestablished in 1999.

== Commanders ==
From 1966 to 1999, the heads of the Barnaul VVAUL were:

- December 14, 1966 – February 26, 1970: Major General of Aviation Filimonov, Viktor Nikolaevich
- February 26, 1970 – October 8, 1971: Colonel Lysenko, Ivan Anatolyevich
- October 8, 1971 – October 22, 1975: Major General of Aviation Parfenov, Alexander Alexandrovich
- October 22, 1975 – June 14, 1979: Major General of Aviation Goncharenko, Anatoly Nikolaevich
- June 14, 1979 – November 15, 1983: Major General of Aviation Serazhim, Alexei Mikhailovich
- November 15, 1983 – September 16, 1987: Major General of Aviation Yanakov, Yakim Ivanovich
- September 17, 1987 – June 21, 1993: Major General of Aviation Pozdnyakov, Vladimir Dmitrievich
- November 2, 1993 – April 28, 1997: Major General of Aviation Maksimov, Anatoly Nikolaevich
- April 28, 1997 – March 31, 1999: Colonel Kononov, Yuri Ivanovich
