= Panfilovo (air base) =

Airport in Altai Krai, Russia

Panfilovo Kalmanka-Panfilovo
- Kalmanka, Altai Krai in Russia
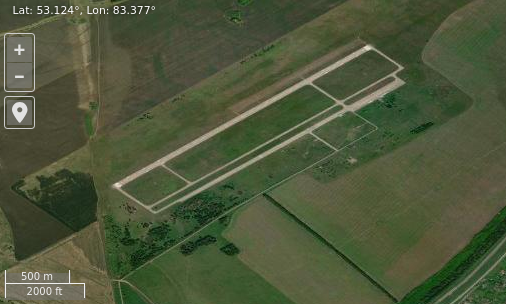
- Satellite imagery of former Panfilovo air base

Site information
- Type: Air Base
- Owner: Ministry of Defence
- Operator: Russian Air Force

Location
- Shown within Altai Krai Panfilovo (Russia)
- Coordinates: 53°07′26″N 83°22′38″E

Site history
- Built: 1967
- In use: 1967 - 1999

Airfield information
Runways
Direction	Length and surface
04/22	2,500 metres (8,202 ft) Concrete

Panfilovo is a former airbase of the Russian Air Force located near to Kalmanka, Altai Krai, Russia.

The base was home to the 44th Training Aviation Regiment between 1967 and 1999 under the Barnaul Higher Military Aviation School of Pilots.

== See also ==
- List of military airbases in Russia
