= Government procurement in Russia =

Government procurement in Russia relates to the public procurement in Russia by all governmental, regional and local authorities. The government procurement in Russia represents a big segment of the budgetary expenses. The volume of government purchases makes about 25 trillion rubles in 2015 and 30 trillion rubles in 2016. The government purchases system is constantly modernized due to changes in legislation, technical components and information.

== Introduction ==
Government procurement facilitates the supply of goods, fulfillment of works and provision of services to meet government needs. Procurement contracts are made via auctions, tenders or by using similar procedures, and through direct awards to suppliers. Government procurements can be contracted with a producer of a good as well as with an intermediary (dealer, distributor). Any legal entity (from an intercontinental holding to an individual entrepreneur) can be a supplier.

Resources of any state institutions are always limited. Therefore during budgeting it is advisable to take into account priority directions, which represent strategic goals and tasks of a state budget policy. Also a very important thing is a balance of national and regional budgets. For these purposes a government procurement is often used. It allows to implement a competition in a realization of government spending.

Government procurements are characterized primarily by that these purchases and deliveries are paid by money of taxpayers. These money are concentrated in appropriate budgets and extrabudgetary funds. According to the current legislature, government procurements include needs of federal public authorities (federal ministries, federal offices, federal agencies etc.) as well as needs of public authorities of state subjects and regions.

== Characteristics ==
- Government procurements are financed by budget or extrabudgetary funds of government institution;
- There are provided special services, whose aim is to ensure state needs and generally needs of people;
- Meaning of government procurements consists in assignment of work to another people;
- Proposal comes from a state authority (government agency).

== Purposes ==
The goal of a system of government procurements is to satisfy interests of its participants:

- supplier - a work in healthy competitive ambiance and provision of sales market;
- state authority (here it is in the role of customer or client) - budget savings, purchase of quality goods, elimination of corruption;
- society (in the role of end-user) - satisfaction of public needs through consumption of quality goods for acceptable price.

The main goal of efficiency of government procurements is a reasonable and purposeful spending of state budget and extrabudgetary funds during government purchases of industrial goods, fulfillment of a work or obtaining a services for national purposes.

The goal of formation of government contract system of government procurements is a provision of fulfillment of public commitments of the government during effective using of its resources and through realization of government procurements.

== Functions ==
One of the main functions of a national authority is a provision of socially significant goods and services to the population. During fulfillment of this important task, the authority needs to act in the interest of the entire population of the country and to use resources of all budgets of appropriate levels. The basic way of realization of authority's service functions is a formation and placing a government and municipal procurements. The formation and placing are carried out publicly in strict accordance with the state law.

During the formation of a government procurement there are taken into account real needs of a government agency of executive power, state institution and the society on the whole. Government procurements are applied for organization and realization of long-term government targeted programs (including supply of goods for federal government needs).

From the standpoint of the state, government procurements have the following functions:

- important element of support of domestic producers (because most goods, services and works, which are included in the system of government procurements, are goods (services, works) which are produced by domestic organizations);
- development of government procurement's system allows to expand a real solvent demand for goods, what then leads to creating favorable motivational conditions for growth of domestic production;
- competitive basis of a placing of government procurements expands the field for development of healthy competition between domestic producers. As a consequence of this, there are created conditions for production more quality output. In addition, more effective using of budget is possible;
- through government procurements the government ensures arrival of products, which are necessary for provision of state needs.

The system of government procurement is the set of legal, organizational and economic measures, which are directed to the provision of national and municipal needs in goods, works and services by means of realization of interconnected phases:

- forecasting and planning of provision of national and municipal needs, including the planning of budget allocations for government procurements (forecasting the demand, justification of priority areas) and asset management;
- procurement of goods, works and services for national and municipal needs;
- monitoring, control and audit.

Russia is not a member of the World Trade Organization's Government Procurement Agreement. A decree issued by the Ministry of Economic Development in December 2008 allows Russian purchasing bodies to offer preferential treatment to national products and services as long as they cost no more than 15% above alternative suppliers' prices. In 2009, "Buy Russian" provisions were introduced.

== History ==
Public procurement is a subject of interest for the public sector, government, and private sector. Development of the public procurement system involves the study of previous practices and historical periods within the field.

The first period from 1992 to 1997. During this period, a big number of documents were adopted, among them 826-UP and 53-FZ. These documents were designed to become the legal basis for regulating the public procurement. Nonetheless, at this stage it was not required to hold a tender when placing a procurement order. This was successfully used by economic agents for personal gain (see Corruption), and thus further additions to the legal base were necessary.

The second period from 1997 to 2006. During this period, legal documents 305-UP and 97-FZ were adopted, which were to become the basis for the formation of the modern system for regulating public procurements. The aforementioned legal documents regulated only the actions of federal customers and were not able to build an appropriate system of placing order process.

The third period from 2006 to 2014. The beginning of the next stage in the formation of the government procurement system is associated with the passing of the federal law 94-FZ. This law brought many changes in the process of procurement order placing, for example, the introduction of the electronic auction, exclusion of the two-stage procedure, introduction of the concept of initial (maximum) contract price. Closed procurement procedures were prohibited, with the exclusion of the orders constituting state secrets. A finite list of situations was created, outlining when an order could be placed with a single source. The use of qualification criteria was limited, along with other changes.

The fourth period from 1 January 2014–present. Federal law 44-FZ comes into force. 44-Fechnology Z regulates the procedures related to the forecasting and planning of public needs, including goods, services, procurement, monitoring, and audit.

== Selection of a supplier ==
Selection of a supplier (contractor) - a set of actions, which are implemented by clients according to the order established in the Federal Law of the Russian Federation No. 44-ФЗ "About the contract system in the field of procurement of goods, works, services for state and municipal needs". This process starts with placing an announcement about procurement of goods, works, services for provision of state needs (federal needs, needs of a subject of Russia) or municipal needs; or, in specified by 44-ФЗ cases, it starts with invitation to participate in selection of a supplier. The process ends with a contract negotiation.

=== Methods for selection of a supplier ===
1) competitive:

- competitions (open competition, limited competition, two-stage competition, closed competition, closed limited competition, closed two-stage competition);
- auctions (electronic auction, closed auction);
- request for financial quotes;
- request for offers;

2) noncompetitive:

- purchase from a single supplier.

=== The main distinction between a competition and an auction ===
- competition is a method for selection of a supplier, where the winner is a participant who offered the best conditions of a contract execution;
- auction - is a method for selection of a supplier, where the winner is a participant who offered the lowest contract price.

=== Characteristics of the methods ===
- open competition: information about procurement is reported by a client to unlimited group of persons and there are unified requirements for participants of the procurement;
- limited competition: information about procurement is reported by a client to unlimited group of persons, there are unified and additional requirements for participants of the procurement and the winner of this competition is selected from participants of the procurement, who passed the pre-qualify;
- two-stage competition: information about procurement is reported by a client to unlimited group of persons, there are unified or unified and additional requirements for participants of the procurement and the winner of this competition is a participant of the two-stage competition who participated in both stages of the competition (including the passing of pre-qualify at the first stage in the case of determination of additional requirements for participants) and offered the best conditions of a contract execution according to the results of the second stage of the competition;
- electronic auction: information about procurement is reported by a client to unlimited group of persons, there are unified and additional requirements for participants of the procurement; conducting this auction is provided on the electronic platform by its operator;
- request for financial quotes: information about procurement is reported by a client to unlimited group of persons; the winner is a participant who offered the lowest contract price;
- request for offers: information about procurement is reported by a client to unlimited group of persons; the winner is a participant whose final offer is the most corresponding to the requirements of a client;
- closed methods (closed competition, closed limited competition, closed two-stage competition, closed auction): information about procurement is reported by a client (through invitation to participate in closed selection of suppliers) to a limited group of persons, who meets the requirements of 44-ФЗ;
- purchase from a single supplier: according to clause 93 44-ФЗ.

== Electronic procurement ==
The Electronic procurement system in Russia was introduced for the first time in 2006, when it was used for incidental, minor tenders. However, it was not until 2009 that the transition process started of shifting to electronic tenders as the main form of conducting public procurement. Since then, the share of electronic tenders in the public procurement sector has been steadily increasing. As of 2016, 56,5% of procurement orders were realised in the form of an electronic tender.

As of 2018, there is strong support for transferring 100% of public procurement orders into the electronic format. The main argument in support of this process is the increased transparency and lower rates of corruption associated with electronic tenders. On the 2018 All-Russian Government Procurement Forum in Moscow, propositions were made to use blockchain technology for public procurement. Blockchain has already been tested for procurement orders of medicaments in Novgorod oblast and, according to Sergey Gorkov, "all the questions regarding the medicaments are precise, clear, and very quick to solve". As part of the same forum, the head of the Federal Treasury (Russian: Федеральное казначейство) Roman Artyukhin announced that, starting 1 January 2019, all the paper procurement orders will become history.

In the February 2017 report by Andrey Khramkin, the director of the Public Procurement Institute, the next steps in the process of transition to the all-electronic procurement system are outlined:

...the following actions are expected:

1. Further integration of state budget, tax, judicial and other databases with the data from unified information system (in order to decrease the number of documents attached to the bids and in order to facilitate inspections of authenticity of data provided by participants).

2. Creation of universal unified platform which would host all state and municipal goods and resources to be distributed according to a competitive procedure (procurement, privatization, sale of lease rights, concession, etc.)

3. Transition of all forms of procurement to the electronic form and paperless document flow.

== Legislation ==
Russian Federal Law N94-ФЗ of 21.07.2005 requires all federal, regional and municipal government customers to publish all information about government tenders, auctions and other purchase procedures on special public government websites.

In June 2012 The Law "On the Federal Contractual System of Procurement of Goods, Works and Services" came up for the first reading in the State Duma. The bill is based on a comprehensive approach to procurement of goods, works and services for state and municipal needs by forming the federal contractual system. It, specifically, ensures the regulation of the entire procurement cycle: planning and forecasting of state and municipal needs, forming and placing orders, fulfillment of contractual obligations and the analysis of the results, as well as monitoring, control and auditing of the observance of requirements. The bill establishes a number of anti-dumping measures enabling rejection of applications with inordinately underestimated prices.

While until now only additions were made to the original legislation, there have been suggestions of rewriting the legislation completely, in order to more accurately address the present-day problems.

== Education and certification ==
In many countries laws demands or recommends customers and suppliers to have certified procurement specialists. Special education organizations provide certification, courses and seminars and publish recommendations for different procurement procedures.

In Russia, numerous public procurement research institutions exist, providing opportunities for further training and certification of professionals working in public procurement. Some higher education institutions, like RANEPA (Russian: Российская академия народного хозяйства и государственной службы при Президенте Российской Федерации, РАНХиГС), also offer courses and certifications in public procurement.

In 1998, The Institute of Public and Regulated Procurement, Competition Policy and Anti-corruption Technologies (a.k.a. the Public Procurement Institute) was founded. The institute works as a research, educational, and expert organization in the field of state and municipal procurement, corporate and other government regulated purchases, and has been part of the public anti-corruption activity.

== Corruption ==
Corruption is widespread in Russia and is a popular topic in economic research. In 2006-2013 public procurement in all the Russian regions was regulated by a single law, Federal Law N94-ФЗ, according to which suppliers may be chosen only through a competitive procedure for all procurements above 100,000 rubles. Before this law, procurers were almost free to choose any supplier they wanted, to pay him any price, the higher – the better. After that the contract would be performed at the minimal possible costs. Any underspend would be shared between the procurer and his supplier.

The rules imply that information on all forthcoming procurements over the threshold is published online at a single centralized website for all regions. After the contract is awarded all results (including names of bidders, most of the bids, winning supplier and the price of the contract) are also available at the same website. The procurer sets a start price, which is the maximum possible price of the contract. Bidders make bids that are lower than the start price. The bidder with a minimum price offer wins the contract. To set the start price a procurer usually asks for quotations from a few arbitrarily selected firms in the market, which send him the price at which they would be able to perform the contract. There are two major types of procedures available for procurers – blind auctions (for purchases below 500,000 rubles) and open electronic auctions (may be used for any purchases but obligatory for most purchases above 500,000 rubles). If only one supplier bids in the open auction, he obtains the contract at the start price.

Despite attempts to make procedures more transparent, to increase the participation of private firms in public procurement, and to fight corruption, there are still many violations that limit the efficiency of public procurement. If a procurer wishes to enrich himself, he could try to negotiate with a single firm (we will call him insider) to share the surplus from the procurement contract, and to prevent outsiders from bidding. So, at the very first step he may set the start price higher, by choosing the highest price from the price quotations, or by choosing firms he is asking these quotations from. Then he may tune the specification of the goods so that only one firm is able to perform the contract.

The other way to limit competition is to include special clauses of delivery that are not suitable to most of the firms, or make the contract very short so that an outsider will be unable to meet it. If nevertheless some outsiders applied to participate in the procedure, he may still exclude some firms from bidding in the open auction, referring to some gaps in the documents they provided. As an auction with only one bidder may be suspicious, in some cases, the procurer or the insider may call another firm to participate, but not to bid, at least not to bid aggressively. That will always result in repeated interactions between the procurer and insider in various procurement procedures.

== Statistics ==
About 3,000 new tenders, auctions and requests for quotations published each day. About 250,000 purchase announcements are published each year on the federal procurement website.

Web resources that collect procurement information also are a source for additional statistics like usage of specific file formats among official organizations or regional economic activities.

== See also ==
- Government procurement
- European Procurement
- Public eProcurement
