= Kamen-na-Obi (air base) =

Airport in Altai Krai, Russia

Kamen-na-Obi
- Kamen-na-Obi, Altai Krai in Russia

Site information
- Type: Air Base
- Owner: Ministry of Defence
- Operator: Russian Air Force

Location
- Shown within Altai Krai Kamen-na-Obi (Russia)
- Coordinates: 53°47′36″N 81°09′03″E

Site history
- Built: 1970
- In use: 1970-1999

Airfield information
- Elevation: 10 metres (33 ft) AMSL
Runways
Direction	Length and surface
04/22	2,500 metres (8,202 ft) Concrete

Kamen-na-Obi is a former airbase of the Russian Air Force located near Kamen-na-Obi, Altai Krai, Russia.

The base was home to the 96th Training Aviation Regiment with the Aero L-39 Albatros as part of the Barnaul Higher Military Aviation School of Pilots.

== See also ==
- List of airports in Russia
- List of military airbases in Russia
