= Automotive Troops =

Automobile Troops of the Soviet

The Automobile Troops are troops in the Armed Forces of several former Soviet states, which transport personnel, deliver ammunition, fuel, food and other military materiel. They also evacuate wounded and sick personnel, and move weapons and military equipment.

Vehicle troops can transport troops that do not have their own vehicles. They consist of automobile (vehicle) units, and units, included in combined arms units and formations, as well as separate units and formations, sometimes constituting separate automobile units. They are called transport troops in some states.

Two of the most important such bodies are the Automotive Troops of the Russian Federation and the Belarusian Transport Troops.

== Automotive Troops schools in the Soviet Union ==
- Ussuriysk Higher Military Automotive Command School (ru:Уссурийское высшее военное автомобильное командное училище). The school was disbanded in June 2007, and replaced by a centre for the training of automotive service specialists, in turned disbanded 2012. After that the 70th Guards Motor Rifle Brigade (from 2018, 114th Guards MRR / 127th Motor Rifle Division) took over the site.
- Ryazan' Higher Military Automotive Engineering School
- Chelyabinsk Higher Military Automotive Engineering School
- Samarkand Higher Military Automobile Command School

== See also ==
- 147th Automobile Base, Moscow, under the Ministry of Defence
