= 2008 Russian military reform =

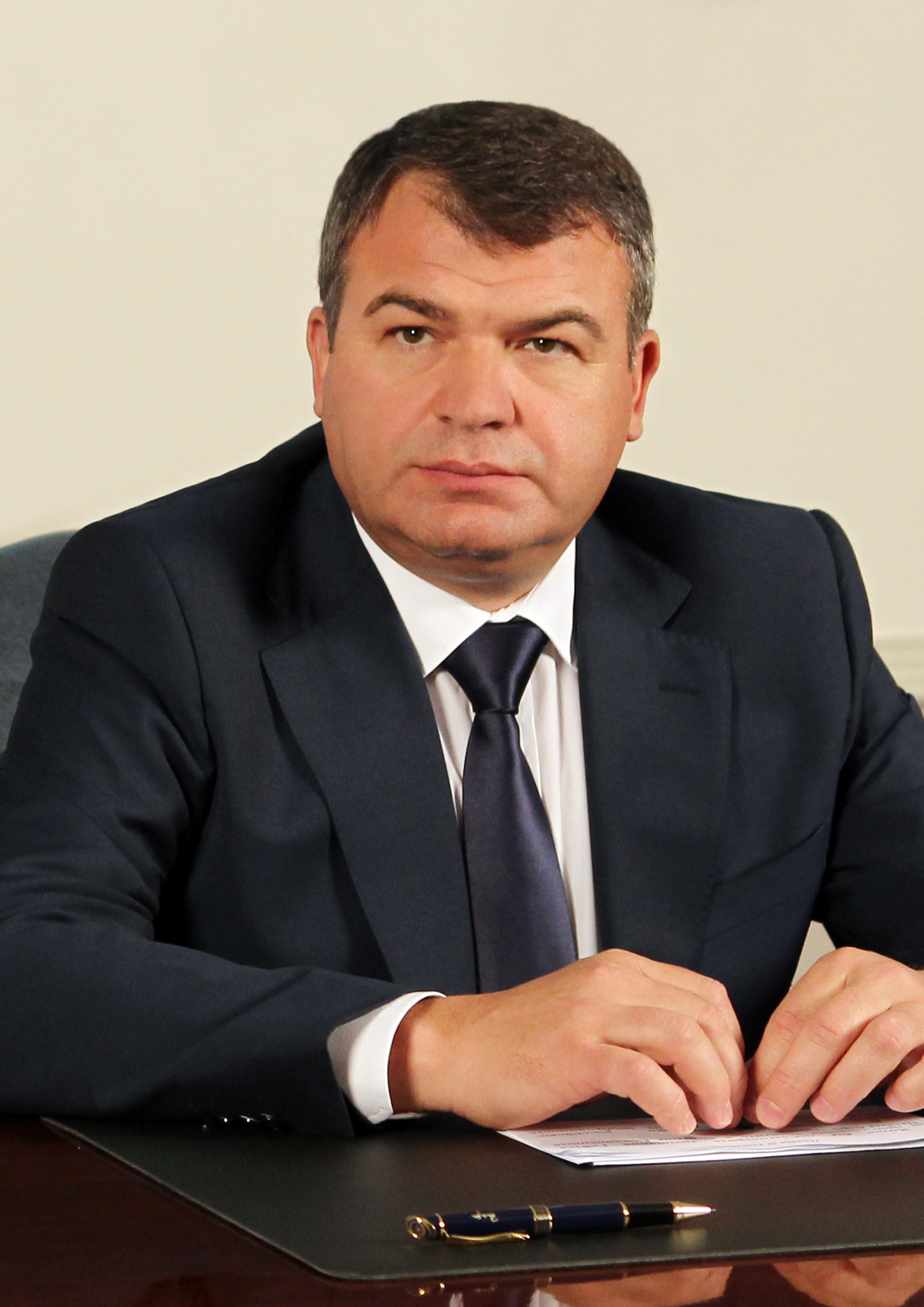
Anatoly Serdyukov is widely regarded as an ideologist of the 2008 military reform

The 2008 Russian military reform (Russian: 2008 Реформа Вооружённых сил России), often referred to as the Serdyukov reform (Russian: Реформа Сердюкова) after its originator, Defence Minister Anatoly Serdyukov, was a major structural reorganisation of the Russian Armed Forces that began in 2009.

Significant reforms of the Russian military were announced in October 2008 under Serdyukov and structural reorganisation began in early 2009. The aims of the reform were to reorganise the structure and the chain of command in the Russian Army and to reduce it in size.

Elements of the reforms announced in October 2008 included:

- reducing the armed forces to a strength of one million by 2012;
- reducing the number of officers;
- centralising officer training from 65 military schools into 10 'systemic' military training centres;
- creating a professional NCO corps;
- reducing the size of the central command;
- introducing more civilian logistics and auxiliary staff;
- elimination of cadre-strength formations;
- reorganising the reserves;
- reorganising the army into a brigade system;
- reorganising air forces into an air base system instead of regiments.

There had previously been several reform attempts such as the 1997 plan under defence minister Igor Sergeyev and the 2003 programme of President Vladimir Putin ('Urgent Tasks for the Development of the Armed Forces of the Russian Federation'), the latter of which was very similar to the 2008 programme, as it emphasised the need for reductions in personnel strength, a gradual decrease in the use of conscripts in favour of professional soldiers, the creation of a professional NCO corps and drastic changes to officer training and education. The 2003 program moved at a very slow pace, mainly due to the unwillingness of the military to reform.

== Personnel strength ==
An essential part of the military reform was the reduction in the size of the armed forces. By the beginning of the reform, there were about 1.13 million active personnel in the Russian Armed Forces. The planned reduction to 1 million servicemen was to be advanced from 2016 to 2022. Most of the reductions fell on the officer corps. They used to account for about one third of the total strength of the Armed Forces, this was to be reduced to 15 per cent.

The enlisted men were to be reduced according to the table:

Category of military men	1 September 2008	1 December 2009	Planned for 2012	Difference
General	1,107	780	866	−22%
Colonel	15,365		3,114	−80%
Lieutenant colonel	19,300		7,500	−61%
Major	99,550		30,000	−70%
Captain	90,000		40,000	−56%
Senior lieutenant	30,000		35,000	+17%
Lieutenant	20,000		26,000	+30%
Officers in total	365,000		142,000	−61%
Praporshchik	90,000	0	0	−100%
Midshipman	50,000	0	0	−100%

On 4 April 2011, General-Colonel Vasily Smirnov, Deputy Chief of the General Staff, said that the reformed forces would consist of 220,000 officers, 425,000 contract servicemen and 300,000 conscript soldiers. The cutting of the officer corps later contributed to officer shortages during the Russo-Ukrainian War.

== NCO corps ==
An important element of the reforms was the creation of a professional NCO corps. Such a corps would serve as the basis for soldier training and military discipline. The NCO corps was to consist of specialists with almost 3 years (2 years and 10 months) of training. The first new NCO Training Centre was established in December 2009 at the Ryazan Institute for Airborne Troops. The future NCOs would occupy the posts of commanders and deputy commanders of motor rifle, reconnaissance, airborne and motor transport platoons, as well as company and battery first sergeants. It was planned to have 2,000 candidates annually. The introduction of sergeants into the system would take not 3 to 4 years as envisaged, but at least 10 to 15. This delay could undermine reform by creating problems with management and the manning of those combat arms where a relatively high percentage of officers are involved in the direct operation of military equipment, such as the submarine fleet and air defence forces.

=== Military districts ===
From 1992 to 2010, the Russian Ground Forces were divided into seven military districts:

- Leningrad Military District;
- Moscow Military District;
- Volga–Ural Military District;
- North Caucasus Military District;
- Siberian Military District;
- Far Eastern Military District;
- Kaliningrad Special Region. (formed in 1997)

In mid 2010, a reorganisation was announced which would consolidate military districts and the navy's fleets into four Joint Strategic Commands (OSK). Geographically divided, the four commands would be

- Joint Strategic Command West – Western Military District (HQ in Saint Petersburg), including the Baltic Fleet and Kaliningrad region;
- Joint Strategic Command South – Southern Military District (HQ in Rostov-on-Don), including the Black Sea Fleet and Caspian Flotilla;
- Joint Strategic Command Center – Central Military District (HQ in Yekaterinburg);
- Joint Strategic Command East – Eastern Military District (HQ in Khabarovsk), including the Pacific Fleet.

In 2014, the decision to give the Northern Fleet more autonomy was made and a fifth strategic command was established,

- Joint strategic Command North – Northern Fleet Joint Strategic Command (HQ in Severomorsk), the Northern Fleet is the main component of the command.

Serdyukov's Defense Ministry will also be putting some soon-to-be-vacant real estate up for sale, e.g., Moscow MD headquarters (Polina Osipenko Street, Moscow), Far East MD headquarters (Seryshev Street, Khabarovsk). The initial asking prices for these buildings and land will be several billion U.S. dollars. As long planned, proceeds from these sales, along with the sale of the Navy Main Staff, military educational institutions, and other military establishments in Moscow, are supposed to fund construction of housing for servicemen as well as military garrison infrastructure in new army deployment locations.

== Ground Forces ==
Before the 2008 reform, the Russian Ground Forces (SV) had 24 divisions, 3 tank divisions, 16 motorised rifle divisions and 5 machine-gun artillery divisions, as well as two division-strength military bases in Armenia and Tajikistan, and 12 independent brigades. Out of those 24 divisions, only 5 motorised rifle-divisions were at full strength in 2008. Only about 13 per cent of the army units could be deemed permanently combat-ready. It was announced that every tank or motorised rifle division would be split, as a rule, into two brigades. This process began in October 2008 with the splitting of the 2nd Guards Tamanskaya Motor Rifle Division near Moscow. By the end of 2009, 23 of the 24 divisions had been disbanded and their elements were used to create 4 tank brigades, 35 motorised rifle brigades (10 of which were existing) and one "fortifications" brigade. All the brigades are permanent-readiness forces.

Almost all brigades are now called otdelnaya (separate), with several units retaining the "Guards" honorific. The only remaining division is the 18th Machine Gun Artillery Division on the Kuril Islands. The number of military units and formations in the Ground Forces were to be reduced from 1,890 to 172 within three years. The original four-link command and control system (military district – army – division – regiment) was replaced by a three-link system (military district – operational command – brigade).

== Air Forces ==
The number of units in the Russian Air Force (VVS) were to be reduced from 340 to 180. The number of air bases would be reduced from 245 to 52. The Air Force planned to eliminate the reduced, two-squadron aviation regiments (those with 24 combat aircraft per regiment). The new organisation of the VVS established the Air Base as the basic structural element. Each air base would include an HQ, 1 to 7 air squadrons (or aviation groups), an airfield service battalion and communication units. The Belarusian Air Force uses the same structure. All Aviation Division HQs were disbanded. The Air Bases receive their orders from the seven new Aviation Commands

- Operative-Strategic Aerospace Defence Command (former Special Purpose Command and 16th Air Army)
- Long Range Aviation Command (former 37th Air Army)
- Military Transport Aviation Command (former 61st Air Army)
- 1st Air and Air Defence Forces Command of the Joint Strategic Command West (former 6th Air Army)
- 2nd Air and Air Defence Forces Command of the Joint Strategic Command East (former 11th Air Army)
- 3rd Air and Air Defence Forces Command of the Joint Strategic Command Center (former 14th Air Army)
- 4th Air and Air Defence Forces Command of the Joint Strategic Command South (former 4th and 5th Air Armies)

All the air defence divisions and corps of the Air Defence Forces (PVO), which were part of the Air Force since 1998, were disbanded and replaced by 13 aerospace defence brigades. These new brigades were distributed among the seven commands and consist of fighter aviation air bases, SAM regiments, and radar regiments. The Gagarin and Zhukovskiy air force academies were merged into the new Zhukovskiy–Gagarin Air Force Academy in Monino.

== Navy ==
The number of Russian Navy (VMF) units were to be cut almost by half, from 240 to 123 units. The navy's fighting capability would be bolstered by bringing various units to their full wartime strength. Other planned changes were the offloading of non-military assets such as housing, the outsourcing of some jobs to civilian contractors and a reduction of the number of non-combat officers. The Fleets were subordinated to the new Operational Strategic Commands, the Northern and Baltic Fleets are part of the Western Military District, the Black Sea Fleet and Caspian Flotilla are part of the Southern Military District, and the Pacific Fleet is part of the Eastern Military District.

Under the State Armament Program, 100 warships would be procured by 2020. The purchase of 20 submarines, 35 corvettes, and 15 frigates was planned. The Navy's schools and research institutes were merged into a territorially distributed Naval Academy Research and Training Center which consists of the Naval Academy, the Higher Special Officer Classes of the Navy, five naval research institutes, three MOD research institutes, the Nakhimov Naval School in Saint Petersburg, and the Naval Cadet Corps.

The Naval Aviation and the support units were reorganised into 13 air bases, which were merged into territorially integrated structures in a second stage. As is the case for the reformed Air Force, each new air base consisted of an HQ, support units, and one or more aviation groups (the former air bases). Several units of the Russian Naval Infantry changed their status. The 61st Separate Naval Infantry Brigade of the Northern Fleet became a regiment, the 810th Regiment of the Black Sea Fleet became a brigade, the 55th Division of the Pacific Fleet was disbanded and replaced by the 155th Separate Naval Infantry Brigade and the 77th Brigade of the Caspian Flotilla was disbanded.

== Airborne Troops ==
Initially it was planned to change the four divisions of the Russian Airborne Troops (VDV) into 7 to 8 air-assault brigades, among a number of other cuts and changes which drew fierce protests from reserve and active airborne troopers who feared a loss of status. General Vladimir Shamanov, who was appointed as the new Commander-in-Chief of the VDV in May 2009 and who generally supported the reform programme, cancelled all cuts and changes in the VDV and announced that the airborne troops would be reinforced. Serdyukov announced that he did not see the need to create independent rapid-reaction forces. "The Armed Forces already have such units in the VDV. They will be strengthened, and each military district will have an Airborne brigade to carry out urgent missions and operations under unpredictable circumstances." The divisions were strengthened and there are now four independent airborne/air-assault brigades.

== Strategic Rocket Forces ==
The Strategic Rocket Forces (RVSN) were to be reduced to eight missile divisions in place of twelve missile divisions.

== Space Forces ==
The number of units/formations of the Russian Space Forces (KV) were to be reduced from 7 to 6.

== Reform of military education ==
The centralisation and cutting of the military education system was closely related to reductions to the officer corps. The Russian military education system had been based upon the previous set of Soviet military academies. Serdyukov announced that the 65 military institutions of higher learning (15 academies, four universities, 46 colleges – including Suvorov and Nakhimov schools – and institutes) would be reduced by 2012 to just ten "systemic institutions", three research and teaching centers, six academies and one university. The new institutions would train officers and conduct research. They would be established according to territory, not combat arm. For now, all facilities would become affiliates of these ten centers; decisions regarding potential closures were to be taken later. Serdyukov affirmed that the entire faculty of military institutes would be preserved and absorbed into the new system and that only the managerial layer would be reduced. He also said that many formerly military specialisations, such as lawyers, would now be educated at civilian facilities.

== Closure of military towns ==
When Serdyukov became Minister of Defence, Russia had 27,000 fortified settlements–military bases, that were in practice closed towns. The reforms of 2008 reduced this number to 500. The problems with this began when the search started for alternative owners. Mostly the local councils were obliged to take them over but this created problems that made local councils reluctant. There was no decent oversight over the residents, many towns contained large criminal or destitute people that the local law enforcement was unable to touch, since the closed establishment was under military jurisdiction. The residential and infrastructure was in a poor condition and locals councils did not have resources to repair. As long as these towns were under the control of the military, residents from these establishments could make written complaints. Most complaints disappeared, were ignored or simply received no reply. Complaining was useless and responsible people with power to change anything were not reachable. Local councils, who after Serdyukov's reforms had to take over, are reachable. Considering the residents of these towns also gained right to participate local elections after military's withdrawal, most of the local councils management did not want to take them over.

== Bringing finances under control and reducing the power of the General Staff ==
Despite significant increases in defence spending before Serdyukov became defence minister, the better funding was not visible because it had vaporised. Apparently Serdyukov's first task was to establish control over finance, explaining why he created a financial control department in the MoD and staffed it with people from the Federal Taxation Service. This strained already explosive relations between Serdyukov and the General Staff further since traditionally everything defence related was under the General Staff's control. General Yuri Baluyevsky's dismissal from the General Staff, implementing reforms in 2008 and the promotion of General Nikolay Yegorovich Makarov was a salami slicing tactics style of cutting power from the General Staff. Serdyukov's next step was to reduce massive maintenance costs since the Russian military before the reforms was essentially a smaller version of the Soviet Armed Forces. Since 1991, there had been many plans to reform the Russian military to post-Soviet level and make it more suitable for Russian national defence needs but resistance from the General Staff and existing structures, most of them were implemented only by name. The reforms of 2008 was the first clearly implemented reform where the General Staff's resistance was broken.

There were multiple samples of the mismanagement of funds under the General Staff. The most famous incident was with the Russian submarine Ekaterinburg (K-84). On 29 December 2011 around 12:20 UTC, Ekaterinburg caught fire while in the floating drydock PD-50. As per some date, three fires happened on that day and the last one went out of control, creating a dangerous incident with the weaponry on board, including nuclear weapons. Officials initially claimed that all weaponry was moved from the Ekaterinburg beforehand but Deputy Prime Minister Dmitry Rogozin led the investigation and concluded Ekaterinburg "did not unload the ammunition set for repair: there were torpedoes on it, and regular ballistic missiles". Part of the reason for Moscow's dissatisfaction was that funds had been released to remove the armaments from Ekaterinburg for the duration of repairs but these most likely disappeared. Another issue was ammunition storage and ammunition dump explosions, such as the Severomorsk Disaster that did have a risk occurring once in a while. Before the 2008 reforms Russian military industry used 150,000 tons of ammunition a year. By 2011, there were 4.5 million tons of obsolete ammunition in storage at ammunition depots. Some of the obsolete ammunition in storage were made in the 1920s for artillery and there was also ammunition for T-34 tanks, that had been retired. By the end of 2012, Russian military training fields had been blown up with 3.6 million tons of this ammo. Russia's military industry, which had been responsible for storing this ammunition, did not like this since it proved to be a detriment to their business.
