= Slavgorod (air base) =

Airport in Altai Krai, Russia

Slavgorod
- Slavgorod, Altai Krai in Russia
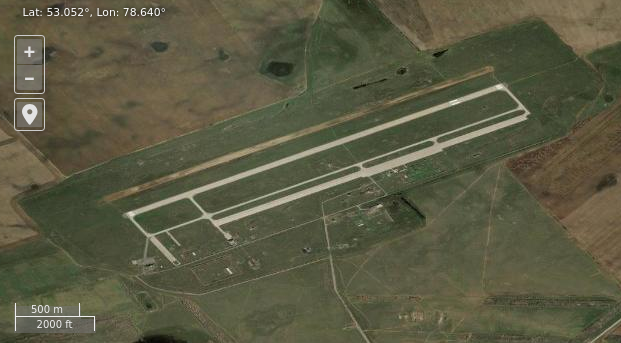
- Satellite imagery of Slavgorod air base

Site information
- Type: Air Base
- Owner: Ministry of Defence
- Operator: Russian Air Force

Location
- Shown within Altai Krai Slavgorod (Russia)
- Coordinates: 53°03′08″N 78°38′25″E

Site history
- Built: 1968
- In use: 1968 - 1999

Airfield information
- Identifiers: ICAO: ZAJ8
- Elevation: 98 metres (322 ft) AMSL
Runways
| Direction | Length and surface |
|---|---|
| 05/23 | 2,500 metres (8,202 ft) Concrete |

Slavgorod (also known as Slavgorod North) is an air base in Russia located 5 km south of Slavgorod, Altai Krai. It is an abandoned, decaying airfield that has a large taxiway pattern.

It was the home of the 59th Training Aviation Regiment of the Barnaul Higher Military Aviation School of Pilots (Siberian Military District) from 1968-1999.

== See also ==
- List of military airbases in Russia
