= Military budget of Russia =

Modern Russian military spending, from 1992 to 2025 in millions of constant 2024 US dollars, SIPRI

The military budget of Russia is the portion of the overall budget of Russia that is allocated for the funding of the Russian Armed Forces. This military budget finances employee salaries and training costs, the maintenance of equipment and facilities, support of new or ongoing operations, and development and procurement of new weapons, equipment, and vehicles. According to estimates for the 21 years from 2000, Russia increased its military budget from $9.23bn to $65.9bn, or more than 600 percent. Moscow spends more on the military than any country in Europe. The Russia-Ukraine war that began in 2022 has led to an even greater acceleration in Russian spending, with Russia spending ~$184bn in 2026 and planning to spend ~$242bn in 2027.

== History ==
=== 1990's ===
In 1988 military spending was a single line item in the Soviet Union state budget, totaling 21 billion rubles (68.8 billion 1988 U.S. dollars). Given the size of the military establishment, however, the actual figure was considered to be far higher. However, in the wake of the breakup of the Soviet Union and the emergence of Russian Federation as an independent state, between 1991 and 1997 Russia's defence spending fell by a factor of eight in real prices. Between 1988 and 1993 weapons production in Russia fell by at least 50% for virtually every major weapons system.

In 1998, when Russian Federation experienced a severe financial crisis, its military expenditure in real terms reached its lowest point— barely one-quarter of the USSR's in 1991, and two-fifths of the level of 1992, the first year of Russia's independent existence. However, since the rise to power of Vladimir Putin and the exposure of the poor state of preparedness amongst Russia's armed forces in the Chechen Wars, Russian military spending has rapidly increased, particularly after the 2008 Russian military reform. According to SIPRI, Russian military spending in real terms in 2012 was the highest it has been since Russian Federation's re-emergence as an independent nation, but is still far lower than the estimated military expenditure of the USSR in 1990 - its final full year of existence (US$291 billion at 2012 prices).

=== The Putin era ===
The budget expanded from 1998 until 2015, but economic problems including a sharp decline in the oil price mean it will be cut by 5.3% in 2016 despite analysts saying that large increases are required to fund the current equipment plans and accommodate high rates of inflation; the navy may be the most likely victim of cuts.

IHS Inc. estimated the 2013 Russian military budget as being US$68.9 billion, US$78 billion in 2014, and predict a rise to US$98 billion in 2016. IHS described this as a rapid increase in spending which will result in the defence budget increasing from 15.7 percent of federal expenditure in 2013 to 20.6 percent by 2016.

The International Institute of Strategic Studies (IISS) estimated the 2013 Russian military budget at US$68.2 billion, a 31% rise since 2008. IISS noted in their 2013 report that this meant that Russia had passed the UK and Saudi Arabia to become the world's third largest military spender, though exchange rates had also been a factor in this.

The SIPRI 2017 Military Expenditure Database estimated Russia's military expenditure in 2016 at US$69.2 billion. This estimate is roughly twice that of SIPRI's estimate of the Russian military budget for 2006 (US$34.5 billion).

In 2014, Russia's military budget of 2.49 trillion rubles (worth approximately US$69.3 billion at 2014 exchange rates) was higher than any other European nation, and approximately 1/7th (14%) of the US military budget. However, a collapse in the value of the Rouble greatly reduced the dollar-value of the planned 2015 Russian military budget to US$52 billion, despite a 33% increase in its Rouble-value to 3.3 trillion. Due to the ongoing crisis the planned 33% increase had to be reduced to 25.6%, meaning the 2015 Russian military budget totalled 3.1 trillion rubles. The originally planned 3.36 trillion budget for 2016 was also reduced to a planned budget of 3.145 trillion rubles, an increase of only 0.8% over 2015.

Russia's military spending in 2021 hit $66bn, says the Stockholm International Peace Research Institute (SIPRI).

=== Russian invasion of Ukraine ===
Russia's official 2022 military budget was expected to be 4.7 trillion rubles ($75bn), or higher, and about $84bn for 2023, 40% more than initial military budget announced in 2021. Between 2022 and 2025, Russia planned to spend in total $600bn on military and the police.

However, Russia's launching of a full-scale war against Ukraine meant that by July 2022 they were spending an estimated $400 million per day. In November 2022 Forbes Ukraine estimated that, in its first nine months, Russia had spent $82 billion on the invasion of Ukraine. Reuters reported that governments documents showed military spending would exceed $100bn in 2023. SIPRI estimated that it would reach $140bn in 2024, making 35% of all government spending. Russia's military budget in 2025 constituted 7.1% of its GDP. Defense and security spending accounted for 40% to 50% of Russia's total government spending in 2025, exceeding combined spending on education, healthcare, social policy and the national economy. In February 2026, the Federal Intelligence Service (BND) of Germany reported that Russia spent about half of its state budget on its military in 2025. They also found that Russia's real defence spending was 66% higher than official numbers suggested, this figure was said to be worth approximately 250 billion euros (8.01 trillion rubles) in 2025. This was also about 10% of the entire Russian GDP for 2025.

The budget for 2027 is set at 17.1 trillion roubles ($202.58 billion) according to documents seen by the Reuters press agency. In October 2026 SIPIR published even higher sums taken from the draft federal budget for planned Russian military spending in 2027, summing up to $242bn, though they also estimated that Russian military expenditure was due to fall in following years.

== Unofficial estimates ==
Unofficial estimates typically place the total amount of military spending for the Russian Federation higher than the Russian government figures, but these calculations tend to differ between organizations. According to the IISS "By simple observation..[the military budget] would appear to be lower than is suggested by the size of the armed forces or the structure of the military–industrial complex, and thus neither of the figures is particularly useful for comparative analysis".

== See also ==
- Military budget of China
- Military budget of the United States
- List of countries by military expenditures
- List of countries by number of military and paramilitary personnel
