= Yagunovo =

Yagunovo Ягуново
- Village
- Location within Bashkortostan Location within Russia
- Coordinates: 55°15′N 58°31′E
- Country: Russia
- Region: Bashkortostan
- District: Kiginsky District
- Time zone: UTC+5:00

Yagunovo (Russian: Ягуново; Bashkir: Яуын, Yawın) is a rural locality (a village) in Ibrayevsky Selsoviet, Kiginsky District, Bashkortostan, Russia. The population was 176 as of 2010. There are 5 streets.

== Geography ==
Yagunovo is located 24 km southwest of Verkhniye Kigi (the district's administrative centre) by road. Staromikhametovo is the nearest rural locality.
