= Kaliningrad Special Region =

Military district of the Russian Armed Forces (1997–2010)

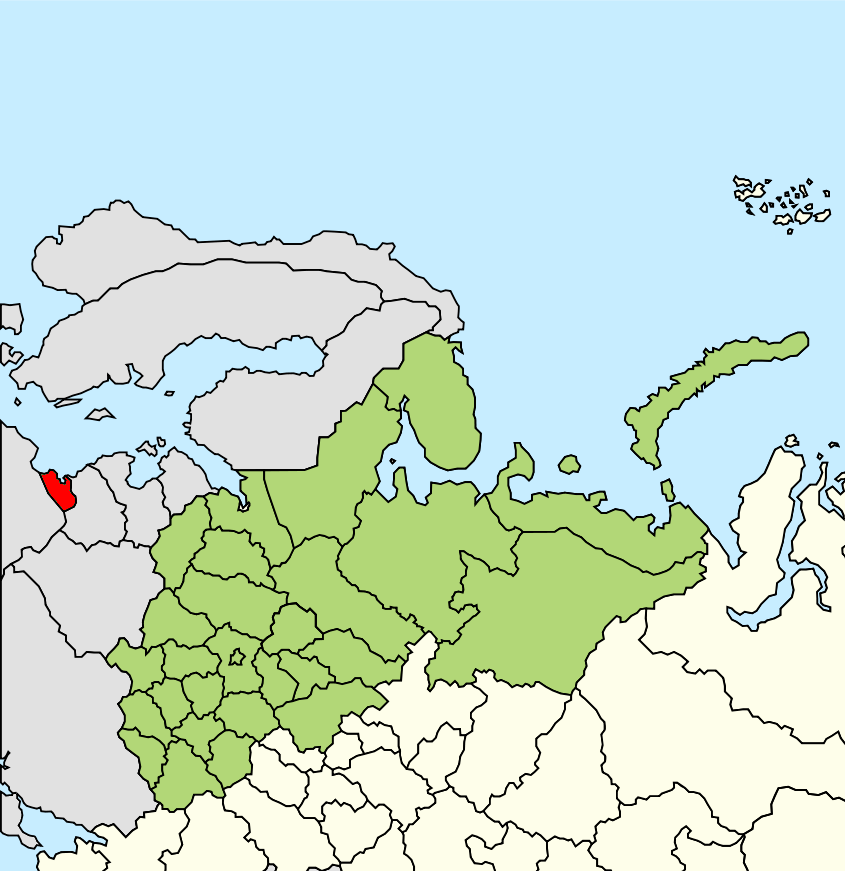
The Kaliningrad Defensive Region (red on the left) on the map of the Western Military District (green)

The Kaliningrad Special Region (Russian: Калининградский особый район; also known as the Kaliningrad Defensive Area; Калининградский оборонительный район, КОР) was a military district of the Russian Armed Forces from 1997 to 2010. It was tasked with the defense of the Kaliningrad Oblast and protection of national interests in the southern Baltic. The area of the KDA was unique in Russia, as separate branches of the armed forces existed under a single command. In recent years, the Kaliningrad Special Region played an important role in countering the U.S. missile defense system in Europe. On September 1, 2010, the district was merged with the Leningrad and Moscow military districts to create the Western Military District.

Kaliningrad is the headquarters of the Russian Baltic Fleet, and also includes the Chernyakhovsk, Donskoye, and Kaliningrad Chkalovsk air bases.

== History ==
In 1991 and 1992, the headquarters of the Baltic Fleet began conducting research on the creation of a combined Armed Forces group for the Kaliningrad region. The Kaliningrad Special Region was established on August 1, 1994, within the administrative borders of the Kaliningrad Oblast. The new region included the Baltic Fleet, the air defense forces of the Kaliningrad area, the 11th Guards Army, Kaliningrad Border Forces, and the Kaliningrad forces of the Internal Troops.

On February 1, 1997, the 11th Guards Army was disbanded, and became the Ground and Coastal Defense Forces of the Baltic Fleet. The Kaliningrad Special Region existed as a separate military-administrative district, not as part of the military districts, until it was merged into the Western Military District on September 1, 2010.

== Geopolitical position ==
Following the dissolution of the Soviet Union, and the subsequent accession of Poland and the Baltic states into NATO, Kaliningrad became isolated from the rest of Russia. However, its geographical location also makes it ideal for the deployment of forces, electronic reconnaissance and attack missile units directed at the rest of Europe. In recent years, the threat of Russian missiles being deployed in Kaliningrad has been used to counter US plans to deploy a missile defense system in Eastern Europe.

In 2012, Russia chose Kaliningrad as the second region (after Moscow) to deploy the S-400 (SAM) missile system.

== Combat potency ==
After the collapse of the USSR, the region was one of the most militarized areas of the Russian Federation, and had the highest density of military installations in Europe. Significant amounts of Soviet equipment was transferred there during the dissolution of forces in Eastern Europe. However, the number of troops in the region has declined sharply since then.

In 1999, the Kaliningrad defense region included 850 tanks, 550 multiple rocket launching systems, 350 artillery systems, 99 ships of various types (including six submarines), more than 180 combat and transport aircraft and helicopters, and 25,000 troops. By 2008, region had 30 ships (two destroyers, four landing craft, and a missile boat brigade), three diesel submarines, a brigade of marine, tank, artillery and motorized infantry units, and formations of up to two divisions of the assault (SU-24) and fighter (SU-27) aircraft, S-300 (missile) air defense systems, and OTR-21 Tochka tactical missile systems.

At the beginning of 2010 the number of ground forces in the Kaliningrad special district was 10,500 ground troops (excluding the 1,100 in the naval infantry), divided into one motorized infantry brigade, one mechanized infantry regiment, one missile brigade with 12-18 OTR-21 Tochka systems, one artillery brigade, one helicopter regiment, one defense team. In the army of the Kaliningrad special district at the beginning of 2010 there were 811 tanks, 1,239 armored vehicles and armored personnel carriers of various types, 345 artillery and rocket systems. However, by 2012, the size of the marine brigade in the Kaliningrad region is projected to increase to four thousand troops.

According to 2014 data from the published report of the Russian Ministry of Defence, the number of contract-based regular soldiers and regular NCOs in the armed forces amounted to 225,000 by the end of last year, 127 percent of the annual recruitment plan and an increase over the last two years. Kaliningrad is both in an advantageous and dangerous position for the Russian military and political interests in the Baltic region, and it is a challenge for NATO to counter possible force projection coming from Russian military units stationed there. In 2014, military exercises took place in Kaliningrad with the participation of almost 9,000 people and more than 600 units of military equipment, including 250 tanks and armored personnel carriers, 55 ships, and about 40 units of aircraft, as well as Iskander missile systems. In April 2015 at a special meeting at the Russian Ministry of Defense, in response to the Russo-Ukrainian war and the increase in the NATO contingent in the Baltic States and Poland, it was decided to strengthen the troops in the Kaliningrad region and the Baltic Fleet: another motorized rifle brigade would be added to Russian troops in the region, plus an artillery battery/coastal antiship complex.

=== Baltic Fleet ===
As of 2021, Kaliningrad remains the principal base area for the Russian Baltic Fleet and therefore hosts significant land and air forces, both to defend Kaliningrad and to extend Russian shore-based air and sea denial capabilities (A2/AD) into the Baltic Sea and region.

The principal ground force formation in Kaliningrad is the Russian 11th Army Corps which incorporates the 18th Guards Motorized Rifle Division as well as other corps level units. The 336th Guards Naval Infantry Brigade, based in Baltiysk, is the Baltic Fleet's naval infantry formation.

Aviation and Air Defence Forces in the region include the 132nd Mixed Aviation Division and the 44th Air Defence Division.

== Literature ==
- The Military Balance 2010. page 226. Kaliningrad Special Region.
- Ъ-Газета — Оборонительный район на подступах к НАТО. Калининградская область станет особым районом
- В. Егоров. Военно-политическая обстановка в Балтийской морской зоне в конце 20 века и ее перспективы в 21 веке
- Новые колеса. Смертельное авиашоу. Под Калининградом разбился бомбардировщик Су-24М
- Военно-политическое обозрение. Угроза России на Балтийском стратегическом направлении
- Информационно-аналитический центр. Е. Абрамова. Ключевые проблемы российско-балтийских отношений
- Балтийский флот. Калининградский особый район
- Российская газета. Генштаб ответил. Генерал Макаров раскрыл наши планы против ПРО
- газета.ru Политика. Передел России
- Указ Президента РФ от 27 июля 1998 г. N 900 О военно-административном делении Российской Федерации
- Независимая газета. В. Н. Абрамов. Янтарный пистолет, он же мишень
- Совинформбюро. Реанимация Калининградского оборонительного района неизбежна
- Военный обозреватель. РЛС воздушно-космической обороны в Калининграде заступила на боевое дежурство
- Независимое военное обозрение. А. Рябушев. Калининградский ответ на евроПРО США
- М. Г. Победенный. Особенности геополитического положения Калининградской области и проявляемые угрозы пограничной безопасности Российской Федерации
- Независимая газета. А. Рябушев. Янтарный край атаковали агрессоры
- NEWSBALT В. Абрамов. Балтийские итоги-2011: Рано говорить о формировании субрегионального субъекта европейской политики
- Независимая газета. А. Рябушев. Дмитрий Медведев повысил боеготовность
