= Nikolai Staskov =

Russian and Soviet general (born 1951)

- Born: 28 August 1951 (age 75); Buda, Smolensk Oblast, Russian SFSR, Soviet Union
- Alma mater: Ryazan Guards Higher Airborne Command School; Frunze Military Academy; Military Academy of the General Staff of the Armed Forces of Russia; Russian Presidential Academy of Public Administration
- Military career
- Allegiance: Soviet Union (to 1991); Russia
- Branch: Soviet Airborne Forces; Russian Airborne Forces
- Service years: 1973–2005
- Rank: Lieutenant General
- Commands: "Eastern" group of forces; 44th Training Airborne Division
- Conflicts: Ethiopian Civil War; First Battle of Massawa; First Chechen War; Kosovo War; Incident at Pristina Airport; Dagestan War
- Other work: Deputy chairman of DOSAAF

Lieutenant General Nikolai Viktorovich Staskov (Note: Russian: Николай Викторович Стаськов) (born 28 August 1951) is a Russian retired military officer. He was the deputy commander of the Russian Airborne Forces for peacekeeping from 1993 to 1997, and the chief of staff and first deputy commander of the Airborne Forces from 1998 to 2005.

Staskov is a veteran of the Ethiopian Civil War, the First Chechen War, and the Dagestan War. He graduated from the Ryazan Guards Higher Airborne Command School, the Frunze Military Academy, and the Russian General Staff Academy. He was a military advisor in Ethiopia, and later commanded some of the forces that were involved in the storming of Grozny in Chechnya. Throughout the 1990s he also oversaw the deployment of Russian troops into former Yugoslavia as part of the United Nations Protection Force, and the NATO Implementation Force and Kosovo Force.

After becoming the chief of staff and first deputy commander of the Airborne Forces he helped with the reform of the service, including the change of the 76th Guards Airborne Division into an all-volunteer unit as part of the plan to turn the entire service into a fully professional force. Although he was not chosen to become the commander of the Russian Airborne Forces, Staskov had a significant influence on the development of the branch in the post-Soviet years. He retired from military service in 2005.

He stood as a candidate for governor of Pskov Oblast in the 2004 Russian gubernatorial elections but did not win. In 2005 he earned a doctorate of political science from the Russian Presidential Academy of Public Administration. Since 2016 he has been the secretary and deputy chairman of DOSAAF.

== Early life and education ==
Staskov was born on 28 August 1951 in the village of Buda, Smolensk Oblast, in the Russian SFSR of the Soviet Union. He grew up without a father, and his mother was at work all day to support their family, so he was raised by his grandmother. They lived in a rural village and Staskov worked on a farm. He has an older brother who became an officer of the Soviet Airborne Forces (VDV), and he decided to follow his brother's example. Staskov entered the Ryazan Guards Higher Airborne Command School in 1969 and graduated in 1973. He served as a platoon and later company commander, eventually leading an airborne reconnaissance company.

His later military education included graduating from the Frunze Military Academy in 1983 and from the General Staff Academy in 1993. In 2005 he earned a doctorate in political science from the Russian Presidential Academy of National Economy and Public Administration.

== Military career ==
From 1977 to 1978 he deployed to Ethiopia as a military advisor to the Ethiopian Army during the civil war and the Ogaden War with Somalia. After the socialist Mengistu Haile Mariam rose to power in Ethiopia, the Soviet Union provided his government with military advisors. Staskov was in a group of ten Soviet paratrooper officers who were sent to Ethiopia with the task of training the Ethiopian military to carry out reconnaissance, which they did on some islands in the Red Sea. Their goal was to form a reconnaissance battalion from 300 volunteers. At one point during the training Staskov rescued an Ethiopian soldier who was drowning. The Soviet advisors were also involved in combat several times, including at Massawa. The mission to Ethiopia was his first combat experience, and Staskov later described the deployment as a "real school of survival" for him and the group. Two of the other VDV officers were killed and one was captured, leaving seven to return to the Soviet Union.

Back in the Soviet Union he continued to command an airborne reconnaissance company at first before advancing, later serving as a battalion deputy commander and later commander. In the early 1980s he attended the Frunze Military Academy, graduating in 1983, after that serving as a regimental chief of staff, regimental commander, and division chief of staff. In 1987 he was made the commander of the 44th Training Airborne Division just before it became the 242nd Training Center of the Airborne Forces, with the rank of major general, and he commanded the center until 1991. Staskov reached the general officer ranks in his mid-thirties, becoming a major general at the age of 36 in 1988, reportedly making him the youngest general in the Soviet Armed Forces at the time.

=== General officer ===
In September 1991 he was supposed to start attending the General Staff Academy, but before he could leave the 1991 Soviet coup attempt took place in August, and he was ordered to stay in command of the training division by Colonel General Pavel Grachev, who was the commander of the Soviet Airborne Forces at the time. The division was in Lithuania, and Staskov was instructed by the State Committee on the State of Emergency to take control of several Lithuanian radio and television stations, which he did with his paratroopers without any fighting or casualties. Staskov negotiated with their owners to bring the stations under temporary protection during the unrest, and he returned them several days later when the coup attempt fell apart.

In 1991 Staskov was assigned to the Airborne Forces Staff. In May 1992 the Russian Airborne Forces were officially created, following the dissolution of the Soviet Union. Staskov attended the General Staff Academy in the early 1990s, graduating in 1993, and in September 1993 he was appointed the deputy commander of the Airborne Forces for peacekeeping operations. At that time, the VDV had deployed one battalion to the former Yugoslavia as part of the United Nations Protection Force, which was later increased with a second battalion. Two were sent to Abkhazia during the Georgian-Abkhazian conflict, and even more airborne units were deployed to Chechnya at outbreak of the First Chechen War.

In December 1994 Staskov personally led the "eastern" group of forces that entered the city of Grozny, and avoided taking the main roads, which minimized the kind of high casualties that the other attack groups suffered. They nearly made it to the center of the city where Dzhokhar Dudayev was located, but there was poor coordination with other groups, and after the first several days of the Battle of Grozny did not result in a rapid capture of the city, Staskov and another general were relieved of command. On 1 January 1995, while Staskov was in the city, there was a close call when a Chechen fighter with a grenade launcher fired at him when he looked out of the hatch of his BTR armored vehicle. He dove back in and the grenade bounced off the closed hatch, landing behind the vehicle, and he told the driver to move forward. They were able to escape.

Staskov also visited the Russian forces in former Yugoslavia many times during the 1990s. In the fall of 1995 and early 1996, Russia began deploying the 1st Separate Airborne Brigade to Bosnia-Herzegovina to participate in the NATO's Implementation Force after the Dayton Agreement. In December 1995 Staskov was in Bosnia, during which time he met with the Bosnian Serb indicted war criminal Ratko Mladic, without the approval of Russia's NATO allies. He was also seen as a "hardliner" and a "loose cannon" by NATO officers, having been opposed to the NATO mission in Bosnia before, and reportedly did not want Russian soldiers to fraternize with the Americans. His presence in Bosnia was also considered to be in part because of the Russian nationalist and communist victory in the 1995 Russian legislative election. Staskov claimed that the Americans did not want to cooperate with the Russians. This may have contributed to him being sent back to Russia in February 1996.

=== Airborne chief of staff ===
In November 1998 Staskov was appointed chief of staff and first deputy commander of the Airborne Forces. During the spring of 1999, after NATO began its campaign against Serbia during the Kosovo War, Russia began preparations to deploy its own forces into Kosovo from Bosnia to not be left out of the NATO peacekeeping mission in that territory. In May 1999, after the Main Operations Directorate of the Russian General Staff ordered the VDV Staff to prepare to deploy a group of paratroopers from their brigade in Bosnia to Kosovo, Staskov was involved in planning the mission. A column of vehicles from the brigade departed on its way to Kosovo through Serbia. Not the entire chain of command in the military was aware of what was happening, and Staskov told the brigade commander, Nikolai Ignatov, to continue the mission and that he would take all responsibility, after Ignatov had received orders from Moscow to go back. President Boris Yeltsin was later informed and gave his approval to the operation. The deployment caused a stand-off between NATO and Russian troops at an airport in Pristina, on 12 June, but it was seen overall as a success, because Russia was allowed to participate in NATO's Kosovo Force and had reassured its ally Serbia of its support.

In July 1999 Staskov told the media that Russia intends to participate in the Kosovo Force for the long term, and at that point its contribution was up to 1,200 paratroopers. During the Dagestan War in August 1999, the VDV's 7th Guards Airborne Division were the first federal troops to respond to the Chechen rebel attack into the region of Dagestan. Later on, after two Russian paratroopers were captured, Staskov personally went to Chechnya in November to negotiate with the rebel leadership to secure their release, trading several Chechen rebels that had been in Russia captivity. Staskov and the Airborne Forces Staff also made sure, with the support of the General Staff, that the VDV forces deployed in the Second Chechen War operated as their own separate formation, under the command of a VDV general.

Around September 2003 he was one of five generals under consideration to become commander of the Russian Airborne Forces after the retirement of Colonel General Georgy Shpak. Staskov was reportedly the most popular choice within the Airborne Forces, but his candidacy was opposed by the Chief of the General Staff, Anatoly Kvashnin. The post instead went to Alexander Kolmakov. Staskov assisted with the reforms of the VDV, which was maintained as a separate service and the reserve of the president of Russia despite some pressure to integrate it into the Russian Ground Forces, and it was organized into airborne, air assault, and mountain units. He had a role in making the 76th Guards Airborne Division a model unit for the professionalization of the Russian military, and specifically for the plan of turning the VDV into an all-volunteer force. As of 1 January 2004, the division was fully composed of contract soldiers instead of conscripts. He was described as having been a big influence within the Airborne Forces.

He stood as a candidate for governor of Pskov Oblast after being asked to by a group of residents, in the 14 November 2004 Pskov Oblast gubernatorial election. The region is known as being the garrison of the 76th Guards Airborne Division, and he was one of several active and former VDV generals that ran for political offices that year. However, he did not make it past the first round of voting.

Staskov remained as the Airborne Forces chief of staff until he retired from the military in March 2005.

== Later work ==
After retiring, in 2005 he acquired a doctorate in political science from the Russian Presidential Academy of National Economy and Public Administration. His dissertation was titled "Force operations in a system of ethnic conflict resolution: domestic and international aspects."

In December 2013 he became the chairman of the International Union of Paratroopers. In January 2015 he became the representative of the chairman of DOSAAF of Russia for cooperation with the State Duma, and in April 2016 he was made the secretary and deputy chairman of DOSAAF.

== Personal life ==
He is married and has a son and a daughter.

== Awards and decorations ==
Russia and the Soviet Union

- Order "For Merit to the Fatherland", 4th class
- Order of Military Merit
- Order "For Personal Courage"
- Order "For Service to the Homeland in the Armed Forces of the USSR", 3rd class
- 25 medals

Russian Orthodox Church

- Order of Saint Nicholas, 2nd class
- Order of Saint Daniel of Moscow

Foreign

- Republika Srpska: Order of Njegoš

== Sources ==
- Oliker, Olga (2001). Russia's Chechen Wars 1994-2000: Lessons from Urban Combat. RAND Corporation. ISBN 978-0-8330-2998-0. JSTOR 10.7249/mr1289a.
- Kipp, Jacob W.; Warren, Tarn (2003). "The Russian Separate Airborne Brigade – Peacekeeping in Bosnia-Herzegovina". In Mackinlay, John; Cross, Peter (eds.). Regional peacekeepers: The paradox of Russian peacekeeping (PDF). Tokyo: United Nations University. ISBN 92-808-1079-0.
- Zisk, Kimberly Marten (Summer 1999). "Contact Lenses: Explaining U.S.-Russian Military-to-Military Ties". Armed Forces & Society. 25 (4): 579–611. doi:10.1177/0095327X9902500404. JSTOR 45346330.

Military offices
Preceded by Valentin Bogdanchikov	Commander of the 44th Training Airborne Division; 1987	Succeeded by Himself
Preceded by Himself	Commander of the 242nd Training Center; 1987–1991	Succeeded by Vitaly Raevsky
Preceded by Position created	Deputy Commander of the Russian Airborne Forces for Peacekeeping Forces; 1993–1997	Succeeded by Vladimir Kazantsev
Preceded by Alexander Chindarov (as First Deputy); Valery Belyayev (as Chief of Staff)	Chief of Staff and First Deputy Commander of the Russian Airborne Forces; 1998–2005	Succeeded by Valery Yevtukhovich
