= Russian military contingent in Kosovo =

- Российский военный контингент
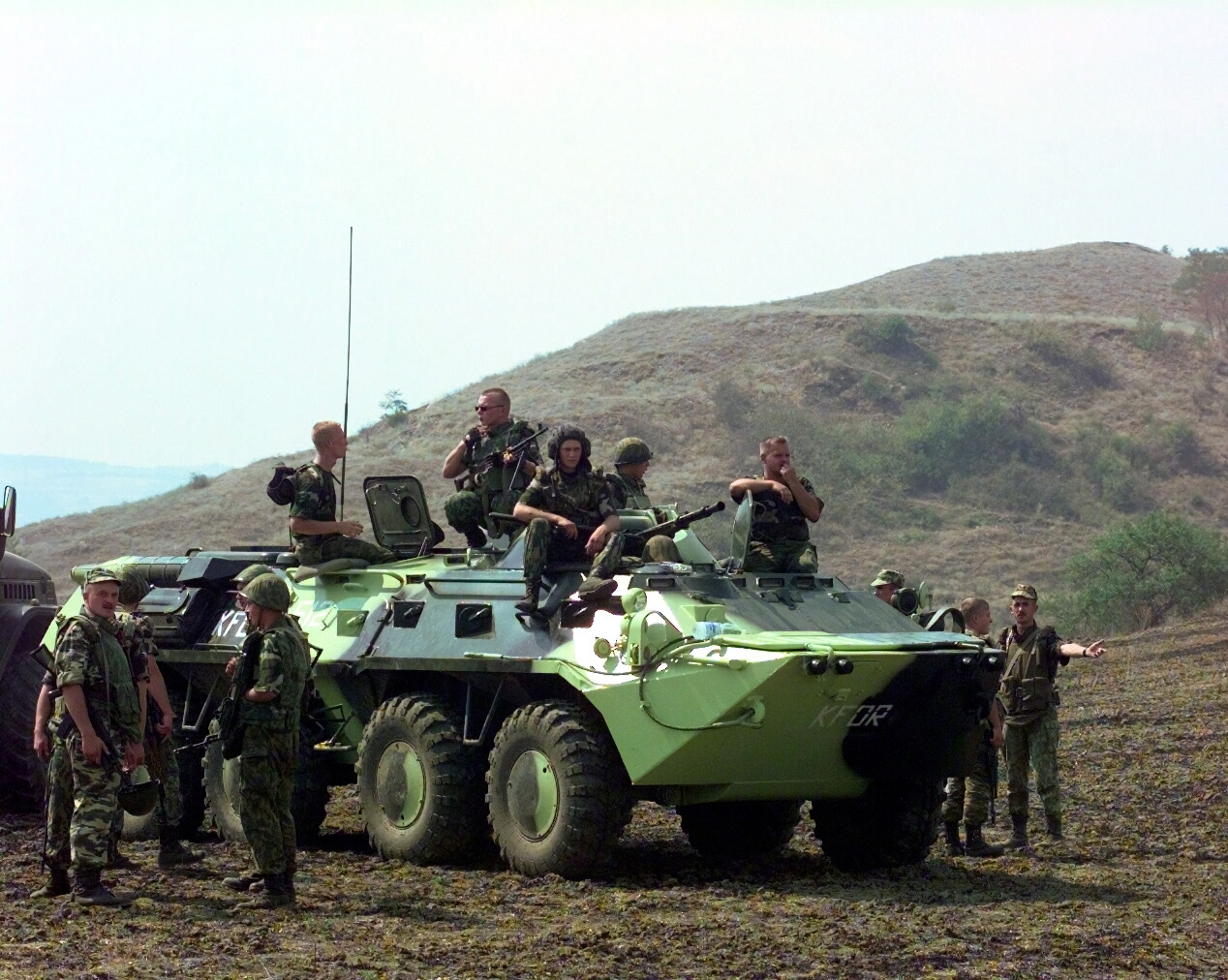
- Troops of the Russian contingent, August 2000
- Active: 1999–2003
- Country: Russia
- Branch: Russian Airborne Forces; Russian Ground Forces
- Role: Peacekeeping
- Size: 1,474 (1999); 3,600 (2000)
- Part of: Kosovo Force

Commanders
- Notable commanders: Valery Yevtukhovich

The Russian military contingent (RMC, Russian: Российский военный контингент, РВК) was Russia's contribution to the NATO-led Kosovo Force (KFOR) from 1999 to 2003. At its peak, the Russian contingent included 3,600 troops, and was the largest non-NATO contingent in Kosovo Force. The majority of troops were deployed in several sectors for peacekeeping work while about 750 provided logistical support from the capital of Kosovo and its airport. It was initially staffed by Russian Airborne Forces paratroopers, before they were rotated out and replaced by Russian Ground Forces soldiers from the Moscow Military District.

The Russian military contingent had a similar command structure to the 1st Separate Airborne Brigade which had been deployed to Bosnia-Herzegovina a few years earlier. The commander of the contingent was subordinated to a Russian general who served as the NATO Supreme Allied Commander Europe's deputy for Russian forces at the NATO military headquarters. Its units were spread out throughout Kosovo and served within three multi-national brigades: the U.S.-led Brigade East, the French-led Brigade North, and the German-led Brigade South. There were also elements of the Russian contingent at the airport near Pristina and in the capital, where the KFOR headquarters was located.

When the Kosovo War began it was not clear whether or not Russia would participate in the NATO-led peacekeeping mission in Kosovo, but the Russian military quickly moved a group of paratroopers from Bosnia to seize control of the airport in Pristina, leading to stand-off between NATO and Russian troops on 12 June 1999. After the incident, it was determined that Russia would be part of NATO's Kosovo Force, and reinforcements arrived in the following weeks. The mission had an authorized strength of 3,600 men. Russia ended its peacekeeping operations in the former Yugoslavia in 2003, with the last troops leaving Kosovo on 2 July 2003.

== History ==
=== Background ===
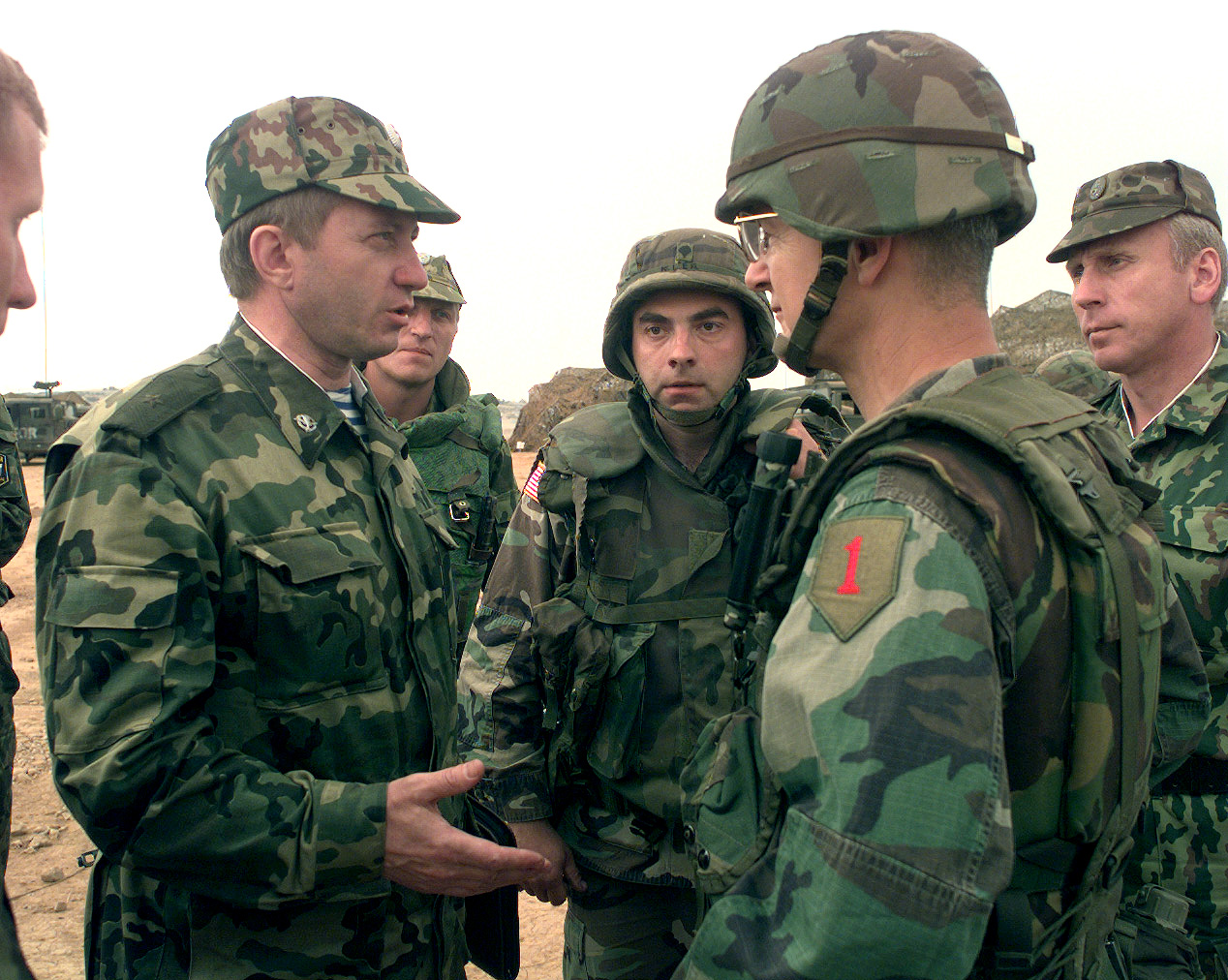
Valery Yevtukhovich (left), the first Russian commander in Kosovo, with U.S. general Bantz Craddock in July 1999

Russia began participating in peacekeeping operations in the former Yugoslavia in April 1992, with the deployment of one Russian Airborne Forces (VDV) battalion, the 554th, with elements of it being sent to Croatia and to Bosnia-Herzegovina in the framework of the United Nations Protection Force (UNPROFOR). This was increased in February 1994 with the addition of a second battalion, the 629th, to Sarajevo, due to the increase in tensions there. The Russian administration of President Boris Yeltsin saw it as being in Russia's interest to participate in maintaining order in Europe and as a way of strengthening ties with the West. Another reason was that their presence could limit NATO actions against the Bosnian Serbs. The U.S. considered Russia to have had an important role in the operations in Bosnia, and after the Dayton Agreement was signed in the fall of 1995 to end the Bosnian War, the U.S. wanted Russia to be part of the NATO-led mission that would ensure it was followed.

In January 1996 the 1st Separate Airborne Brigade arrived in Bosnia, which Russia formed specifically to participate in the peacekeeping operation, the Implementation Force (IFOR). A unique command arrangement was negotiated, with the Russian brigade being controlled by the NATO supreme commander through a Russian general at his headquarters as his deputy for Russian forces, while on the ground its commander answered to the U.S. 1st Armored Division. The U.S. and Russian units were both part of IFOR's Multi-National Division (North). Russian involvement in Bosnia was considered successful by both sides, but there was a crisis during the Kosovo War when in March 1999 NATO began an air campaign against the Serbian forces. Russia had been left out of the discussions on the NATO intervention in Kosovo, though later negotiations in Helsinki involving the Russian government led to a stop in the fighting, and the Russians approved the deployment of the NATO-led Kosovo Force (KFOR) peacekeeping mission at the UN Security Council. However Russia's role in KFOR was still not resolved.

Anticipating that Russia would be left out of the peacekeeping mission, in May 1999 the Russian General Staff ordered the 1st Separate Airborne Brigade to secretly prepare a unit to be deployed into Kosovo ahead of NATO forces. Their goal was to seize an airport, which would be used to send in a larger number of troops from Russia. While negotiations between the U.S. and Russia were still going on, a force of 206 paratroopers in a convoy of vehicles left Bosnia on 11 June and drove through Serbia to Kosovo, arriving on 12 June 1999. This led to a stand-off between British NATO and Russian troops at the Pristina International Airport. The deployment into Kosovo was considered a success in Russia, because it was then granted participation in KFOR. The first Russian reinforcements, 100 paratroopers, arrived on 28 June 1999. The general Valery Yevtukhovich, formerly the commander of the Airborne Forces operational group in Bosnia, was appointed the first commander of the Russian military contingent in Kosovo.

=== Activity ===
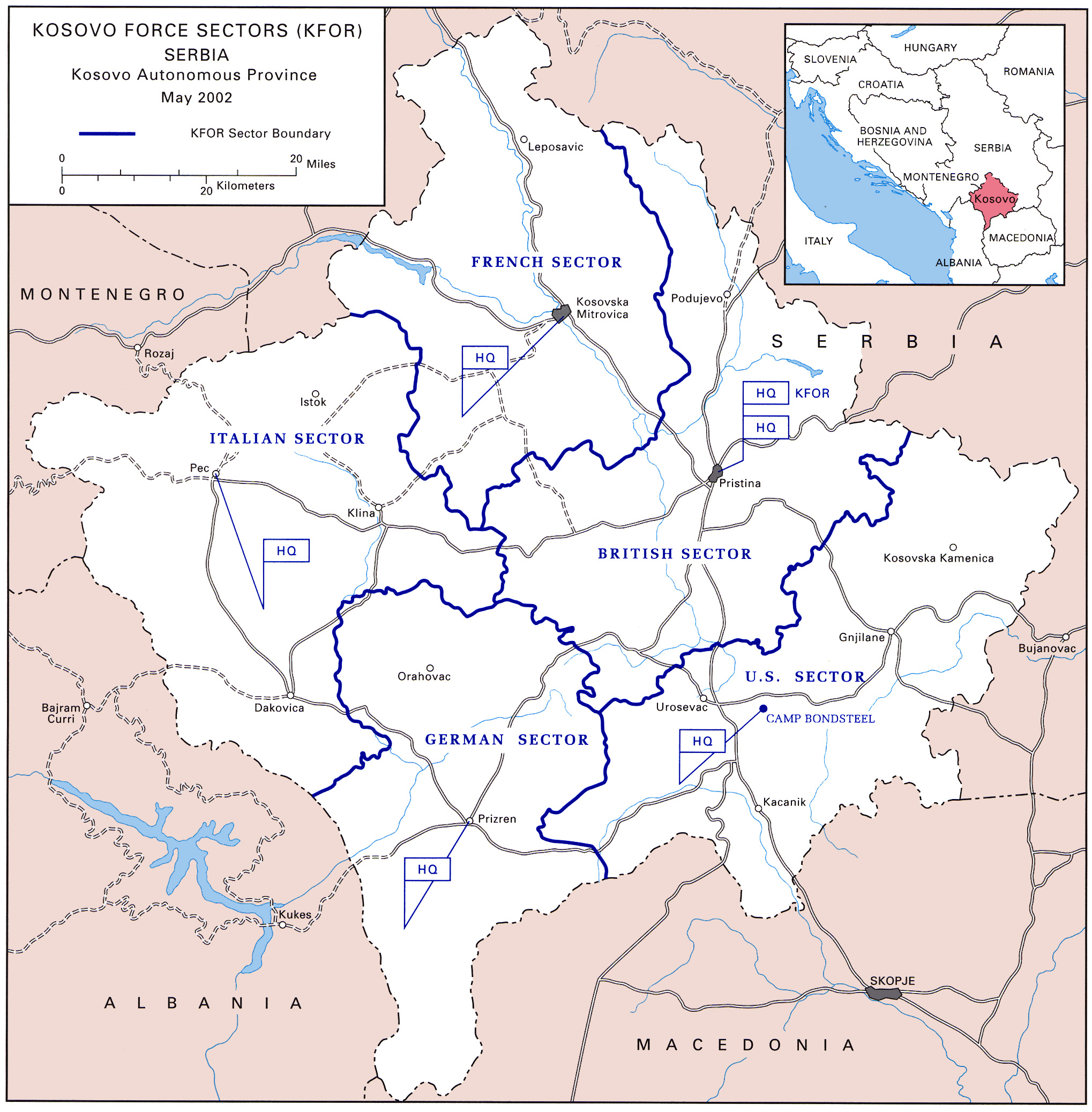
Russia had battalions in the French, German, and American KFOR sectors, along with logistics and HQ staff in the British sector

Extensive negotiations in mid-June 1999 established the details for how Russia would be involved in KFOR, carried out in Moscow between the Russian minister of defense, Marshal Igor Sergeyev, and U.S. secretary of defense William Cohen. The basic framework was that Russian battalions would be assigned to the American, French, and German sectors, with a Russian officer serving as a deputy to each sector commander for Russian forces, and a logistics base would be established near Pristina Airport in the town of Kosovo Polje to provide support to the Russian military contingent. Additional Russian staff were sent to Supreme Headquarters Allied Powers Europe (SHAPE) in Belgium, where the NATO supreme commander and his deputy for Russian forces were, and Russian liaison officers were also assigned to Allied Forces Southern Europe in Italy and the KFOR headquarters in Pristina. The command structure for the Kosovo mission was therefore similar to the existing one for the Russian brigade in Bosnia. The Russian KFOR contingent was given an authorized strength of 3,600 men, including 2,850 peacekeepers and 750 logistics personnel.

The first part of the Russian contingent arrived on 28 June at Pristina Airport and by late July 1999 there were over 1,474 Russian peacekeepers deployed in Kosovo. In accordance with the Helsinki and Moscow agreements, Russia provided the largest non-NATO contingent in Kosovo Force, eventually consisting of over 3,000 personnel in a total force that numbered about 40,000 troops. The Russian military finished deploying its troops into Kosovo on 10 August 1999. Colonel General Georgy Shpak, the commander of the Russian Airborne Forces, announced that the Russian paratroopers in Kosovo will have the right to use force in response to any attacks. Unlike previous Russian contingents in former Yugoslavia, troops sent to Kosovo were not given additional training and initially did not have a unique insignia. Later on they received patches with the term "Russian Military Contingent".

Russian, American, and other NATO troops in Kosovo carried out joint patrols, worked to demilitarize armed groups such as the Kosovo Liberation Army, and provided security for humanitarian and United Nations workers. However, the Russian presence caused significant tensions with ethnic Albanian civilians because of their belief that they were there to assist the Serbs, and Russian-controlled checkpoints came under attack several times. The Russian contingent was subjected to more attacks than any of the other peacekeepers. In August 1999, U.S. general and KFOR officer Bantz Craddock stated that the Russian military had acted professionally and did not show evidence of bias in favor of the Serbs. In early September 1999 a group of three Serbs who had attacked Albanians were confronted by Russian peacekeepers and opened fire on them, and all three were killed by the Russians in the resulting shootout. Within hours this incident, NATO secretary general Javier Solana said that "We are particularly happy they are here and that Russian and NATO troops are working side by side."

The troops of the Russian contingent were inspected by 16–17 June 2001 by Russian President Vladimir Putin during his visit to Kosovo.

=== End of mission ===
Because of financial limitations and political problems, Russia withdrew from the former Yugoslavia in 2003. The mission in Kosovo ended on 2 July 2003, with a ceremony in which the last commander, Major General Nikolai Kriventsov, was awarded the NATO Medal. The KFOR commander noted that they contributed to the restoration of the Pristina Airport and ran a hospital that provided treatment to local patients. It marked the end of the Russian presence in former Yugoslavia, because the mission in Bosnia had ended on 14 June 2003. The Russian participation in KFOR was seen as a success by NATO, achieving their goal of stabilizing Kosovo while also helping increase military-to-military cooperation and interoperability between NATO and Russia.

== List of commanders ==
	Name	From	To	Branch
1	Lieutenant General Valery Yevtukhovich	c. 28 June 1999	30 October 2000	Russian Airborne Forces
2	Major General Vladimir Kazantsev	30 October 2000	25 October 2001	Russian Airborne Forces
3	Major General Nikolai Kriventsov	25 October 2001	2 July 2003	Russian Ground Forces

== Books ==
- Kipp, Jacob W.; Warren, Tarn (2003). "The Russian Separate Airborne Brigade – Peacekeeping in Bosnia-Herzegovina". In Mackinlay, John; Cross, Peter (eds.). Regional peacekeepers: The paradox of Russian peacekeeping (PDF). Tokyo: United Nations University. ISBN 92-808-1079-0.
