= Commander of the Russian Airborne Forces =

Russian general officer position

- Командующий воздушно-десантными войсками России
- Flag of the Commander of the Russian Airborne

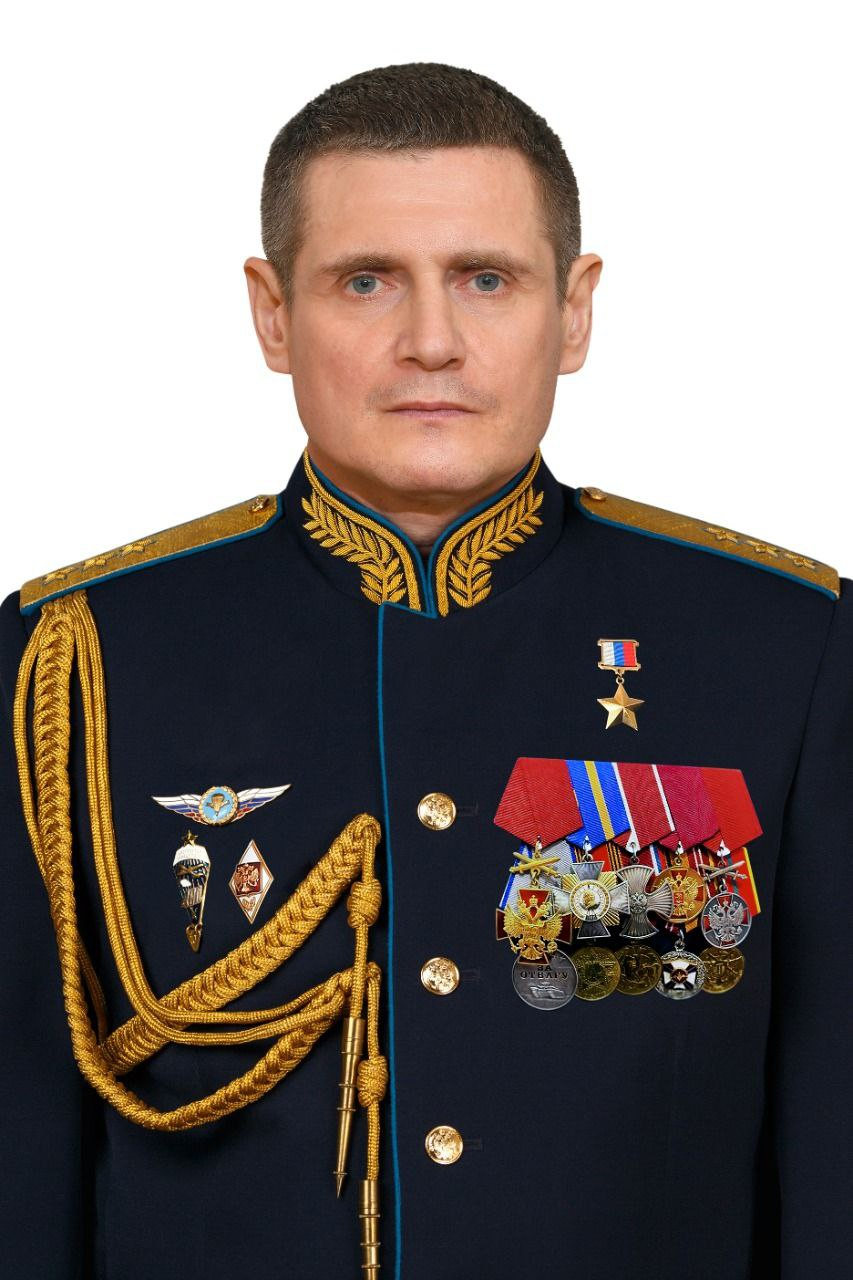
- Incumbent; Colonel General Mikhail Teplinsky since 16 June 2022
- Russian Airborne Forces; Airborne Forces Command
- Member of: General Staff of the Armed Forces
- Reports to: Chief of the General Staff
- Appointer: President of Russia
- Formation: 4 September 1941 (historical); 7 May 1992 (current form)

The Commander of the Russian Airborne Forces (Russian: Командующий воздушно-десантными войсками России) is a general officer position that is tasked with leading the Russian Airborne Forces. The office is part of the Airborne Forces Command and reports to the Chief of the General Staff.

== History ==
On 4 September 1941 the Directorate of the Commander of the Airborne Forces (VDV) of the Red Army was established. All of the Soviet airborne corps were transferred from the front commanders of the Red Army to be subordinated to the new organization, led by the Commander of the Airborne Forces. In October 1944 it was transferred from the Red Army to the Soviet Air Forces. In 1946 the VDV was placed under the direct command of the Ministry of Defense, then became part of the Soviet Ground Forces in 1956, before once again being made a separate combat arm in 1964.

After the dissolution of the Soviet Union, the modern Russian Airborne Forces were officially established on 7 May 1992 by presidential decree No. 466.

In 1998 the Directorate of the Commander of the Airborne Forces was reorganized into the Airborne Forces Command.

== List of commanders ==
No.	Portrait	Commander of the Airborne Forces	Took office	Left office	Time in office	Ref.
1	Vasily Glazunov	Lieutenant General; Vasily Glazunov (1896–1967)	4 September 1944	June 1943	~1 year, 270 days	
2	Alexander Kapitokhin	Major General; Alexander Kapitokhin (1892–1958)	June 1943	August 1944	~1 year, 61 days	
3	Ivan Zatevakhin	Lieutenant General; Ivan Zatevakhin (1901–1957)	August 1944	April 1946	~1 year, 243 days	
4	Vasily Glagolev	Lieutenant General; Vasily Glagolev (1898–1947)	10 June 1946	21 September 1947	1 year, 103 days	
5	Alexander Kazankin	Lieutenant General; Alexander Kazankin (1900–1955)	October 1947	December 1948	~1 year, 61 days	
6	Sergei Rudenko	Colonel General; Sergei Rudenko (1904–1990)	December 1948	September 1949	~274 days	
(5)	Alexander Kazankin	Lieutenant General; Alexander Kazankin (1900–1955)	January 1950	March 1950	~59 days	
7	Alexander Gorbatov	Colonel General; Alexander Gorbatov (1891–1973)	March 1950	May 1954	~4 years, 61 days	
8	Vasily Margelov	Colonel General; Vasily Margelov (1908–1990)	June 1954	March 1959	~4 years, 273 days	
9	Ivan Tutarinov	Colonel General; Ivan Tutarinov (1904–1978)	March 1959	July 1961	~2 years, 122 days	
(8)	Vasily Margelov	Army General; Vasily Margelov (1908–1990)	July 1961	January 1979	~17 years, 184 days	
10	Dmitri Sukhorukov	Army General; Dmitri Sukhorukov (1922–2003)	January 1979	June 1987	~8 years, 151 days	
11	Nikolai Kalinin	Colonel General; Nikolai Kalinin (1937–2008)	August 1987	January 1989	~1 year, 153 days	
12	Vladislav Achalov	Colonel General; Vladislav Achalov (1945–2011)	January 1989	December 1990	~1 year, 334 days	
13	Pavel Grachev	Colonel General; Pavel Grachev (1948–2012)	December 1990	31 August 1991	~243 days	
14	Yevgeny Podkolzin	Colonel General; Yevgeny Podkolzin (1936–2003)	31 August 1991	4 December 1996	5 years, 95 days	
15	Georgy Shpak	Colonel General; Georgy Shpak (born 1943)	4 December 1996	10 September 2003	6 years, 280 days	
16	Alexander Kolmakov	Colonel General; Alexander Kolmakov (born 1955)	10 September 2003	19 November 2007	4 years, 70 days	
17	Valery Yevtukhovich	Lieutenant General; Valery Yevtukhovich (born 1954)	19 November 2007	6 May 2009	1 year, 168 days	
–	Nikolai Ignatov	Lieutenant General; Nikolai Ignatov (born 1956); Acting	6 May 2009	24 May 2009	18 days	
18	Vladimir Shamanov	Colonel General; Vladimir Shamanov (born 1957)	24 May 2009	5 October 2016	7 years, 134 days	
19	Andrey Serdyukov	Colonel General; Andrey Serdyukov (born 1962)	5 October 2016	16 June 2022	5 years, 254 days	
20	Mikhail Teplinsky	Colonel General; Mikhail Teplinsky (born 1969)	16 June 2022	Incumbent	4 years, 83 days	

== Deputies and chiefs of staff ==
=== First deputy commanders ===
Chief of Staff and First Deputy Commander

- Nikolai Staskov (1998–2005)
- Valery Yevtukhovich (2005–2007)
- Nikolai Ignatov (2008–2019)
- Yevgeny Ustinov (2019–2022)
- Anatoly Kontsevoy (2022–present)

First Deputy Commander

- Vasily Margelov (1959–1961)
- Dmitri Sukhorukov (1969–1971)
- Pavel Grachev (1990–1991)
- Osvaldas Pikauskas (1991–1995)
- Alexander Chindarov (1995–1997)
- Post abolished (1997–1998)

Chief of Staff

- Yevgeny Podkolzin (1986–1991)
- Valery Belyayev (1991–1998)

=== Deputy commanders ===
Deputy Commander of the Airborne Forces

- Valery Yevtukhovich (2000–2005)
- Nikolai Ignatov (2005–2008)
- Yevgeny Ustinov (2008–2009)
- Alexander Lentsov (2009–2013)
- Andrei Kholzakov (2013–2019)
- Anatoly Kontsevoy (2019–2022)
- Alexey Naumets (2022–2023)
- Nikolai Choban (2023?–present)

Deputy Commander of the Airborne Forces for Combat Training

- Alexander Lebed (1991–1992)
- Alexey Sigutkin ( –2000)
- Vladimir Oparin (2000–2002)
- Gevork Isakhanyan (2002–2006)
- Nikolai Belyayev (2008–2010)
- Sergey Volyk (2016–present)

Deputy Commander of the Airborne Forces for Airborne Training

- Vyacheslav Borisov (2002–2009)
- Andrei Kholzakov (2009–2013)
- Alexey Ragozin (2013–2015)
- Vladimir Kochetkov (2015–2020)
- Aleksandr Vyaznikov (2020–present)

Deputy Commander of the Airborne Forces for Peacekeeping

- Nikolai Staskov (1993–1997)
- Vladimir Kazantsev (1997–2000)
- Aleksandr Popov (2000–2001)
- Andrei Kholzakov (2019–present)
