= Vladimir Kazantsev =

Vladimir Kazantsev may refer to:

- Vladimir Kazantsev (athlete) (1923–2007), Soviet athlete
- Vladimir Kazantsev (canoeist) (born 1972), Uzbekistani sprint canoer
- Vladimir Kazantsev (general) (1953–2001), Russian general
