= Valery Yevtukhovich =

Russian military officer (born 1954)

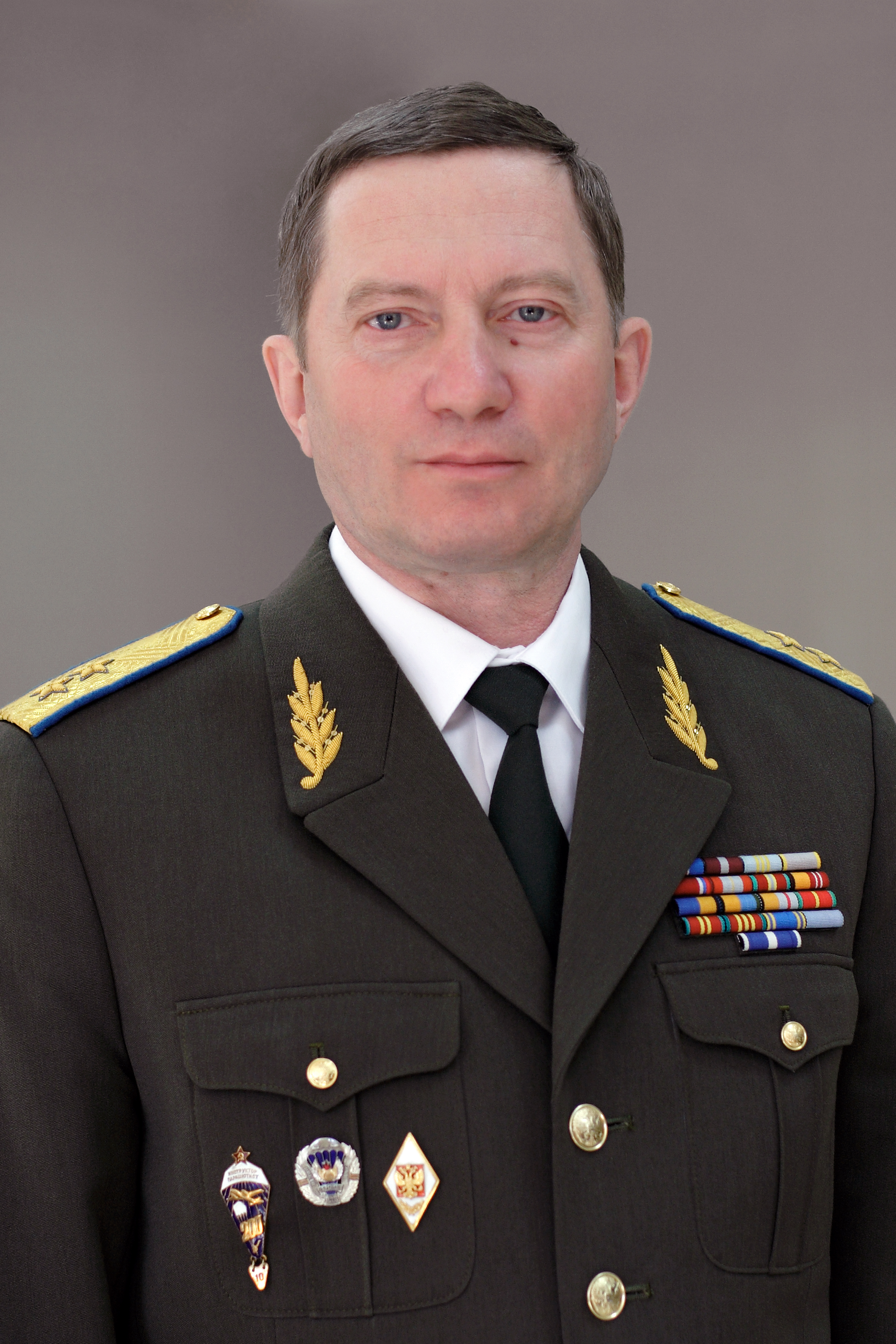
- Official portrait, 2008
- Born: 17 April 1954 (age 72); Vyazma, Smolensk Oblast, Russian SFSR, Soviet Union
- Alma mater: Ryazan Guards Higher Airborne Command School; Frunze Military Academy; Russian General Staff Academy
- Military career
- Allegiance: Soviet Union (to 1991); Russia
- Branch: Soviet Airborne Forces; Russian Airborne Forces
- Service years: 1975–2009
- Rank: Lieutenant General
- Commands: 242nd Training Center; Russian military contingent in Kosovo; Airborne Forces Staff; Commander of the Russian Airborne Forces
- Conflicts: Soviet-Afghan War; Kosovo War; Incident at Pristina Airport

Lieutenant General Valery Yevgenyevich Yevtukhovich (Note: Russian: Вале́рий Евге́ньевич Евтухо́вич) (born 17 April 1954) is a retired Russian Airborne Forces officer who was commander of the Airborne Forces from 2007 to 2009, and was Chief of Staff and First Deputy Commander from 2005 to 2007. Over the course of his career he held positions at nearly every level of command within the Airborne Forces, and was deployed in the conflicts in Afghanistan and former Yugoslavia.

== Early life and education ==
Yevtukhovich was born on 17 April 1954 in Vyazma, Smolensk Oblast, Soviet Union. He graduated from the Ryazan Guards Higher Airborne Command School of the Soviet Airborne Forces (VDV) in 1975.

== Military career ==
Between 1975 and 1979, he was a platoon and then company commander with the 350th Parachute Regiment. From 1979 to 1981, he was deployed to Afghanistan during the Soviet-Afghan War, and held the position of battalion chief of staff and deputy commander, within the same regiment. In 1981, he was briefly a battalion chief of staff in the 234th Parachute Regiment before being sent to the Frunze Military Academy. After graduating in 1984 Yevtukhovich became chief of staff of the 104th Parachute Regiment, holding that position until 1986. From February to September 1986, he was the deputy chief of staff of the 7th Guards Airborne Division before becoming the commander of the 301st Training Parachute Regiment. From 1989 to 1990, he was the chief of staff and deputy commander of the 104th Guards Airborne Division.

=== General officer ===
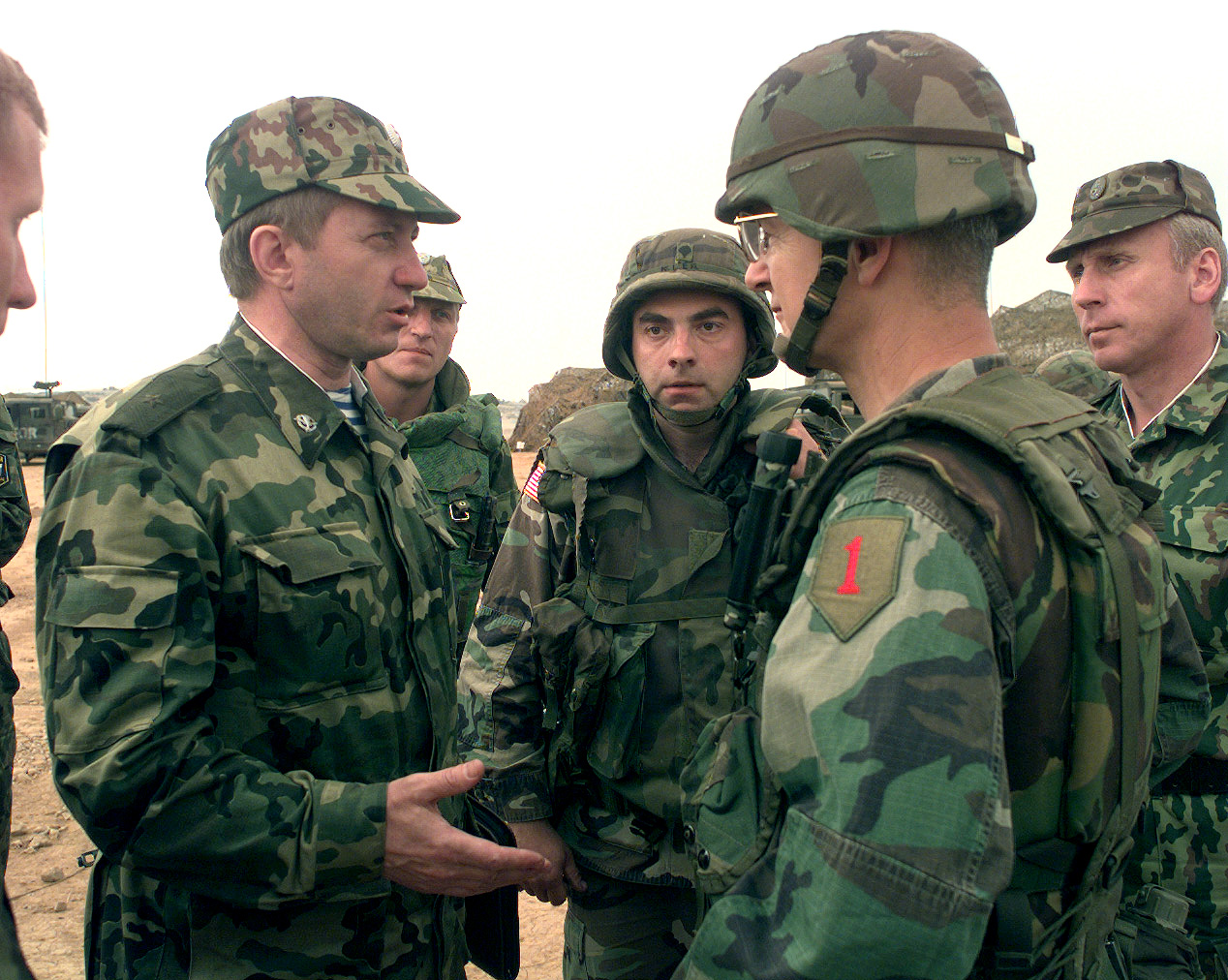
Yevtukhovich (left) and U.S. general Bantz Craddock in Kosovo

From 1990 to 1992, Yevtukhovich was the commander of the 224th Training Center of separate airborne brigade NCOs, and then from 1992 was the commander of the 242nd Training Center of the Airborne Forces in Omsk. He then attended the General Staff Academy from 1994, and graduated in 1996, afterwards serving as Deputy Chief of Staff of the Airborne Forces from 1997 to 1998.

In the late 1990s, he served in the Russian VDV peacekeeping contingent in Bosnia-Herzegovina, being the commander of the VDV operational group there as of 1999. After the Incident at Pristina Airport, which he took part in organizing, Russia joined the NATO-led Kosovo Force, and Yevtukhovich was the first commander of the Russian military contingent in Kosovo. He served in that position from June or July 1999 to October 2000, being succeeded by Vladimir Kazantsev, before becoming Deputy Commander of the Airborne Forces from 2000 to 2005.

Yevtukhovich succeeded Alexander Kolmakov as commander of the Russian Airborne Forces on 19 November 2007. He was dismissed on 7 May 2009 and eventually replaced by Vladimir Shamanov.

== Awards and decorations ==
Russia and the Soviet Union

- Order "For Merit to the Fatherland", 4th class with swords
- Order of Military Merit
- Order of the Red Star
- Order "For Service to the Homeland in the Armed Forces of the USSR", 3rd class

== Notes ==
Military offices
Preceded by Vitaly Raevsky	Commander of the 242nd Training Center; 1992–1994	Succeeded by Sergey Serikov
Preceded by ???	Deputy Chief of Staff of the Russian Airborne Forces; 1997–1998	Succeeded by Yuri Gorsky
Position established	Commander of the Russian military contingent in Kosovo; 1999–2000	Succeeded by Vladimir Kazantsev
Preceded by ???	Deputy Commander of the Russian Airborne Forces; 2000–2005	Succeeded by Nikolai Ignatov
Preceded by Nikolai Staskov	Chief of Staff and First Deputy Commander of the Russian Airborne Forces; 2005–2007	Succeeded by Nikolai Ignatov
Preceded by Alexander Kolmakov	Commander of the Russian Airborne Forces; 2007–2009	Succeeded by Nikolai Ignatov; Acting
