= Alexander Kolmakov =

Colonel General Alexander Kolmakov
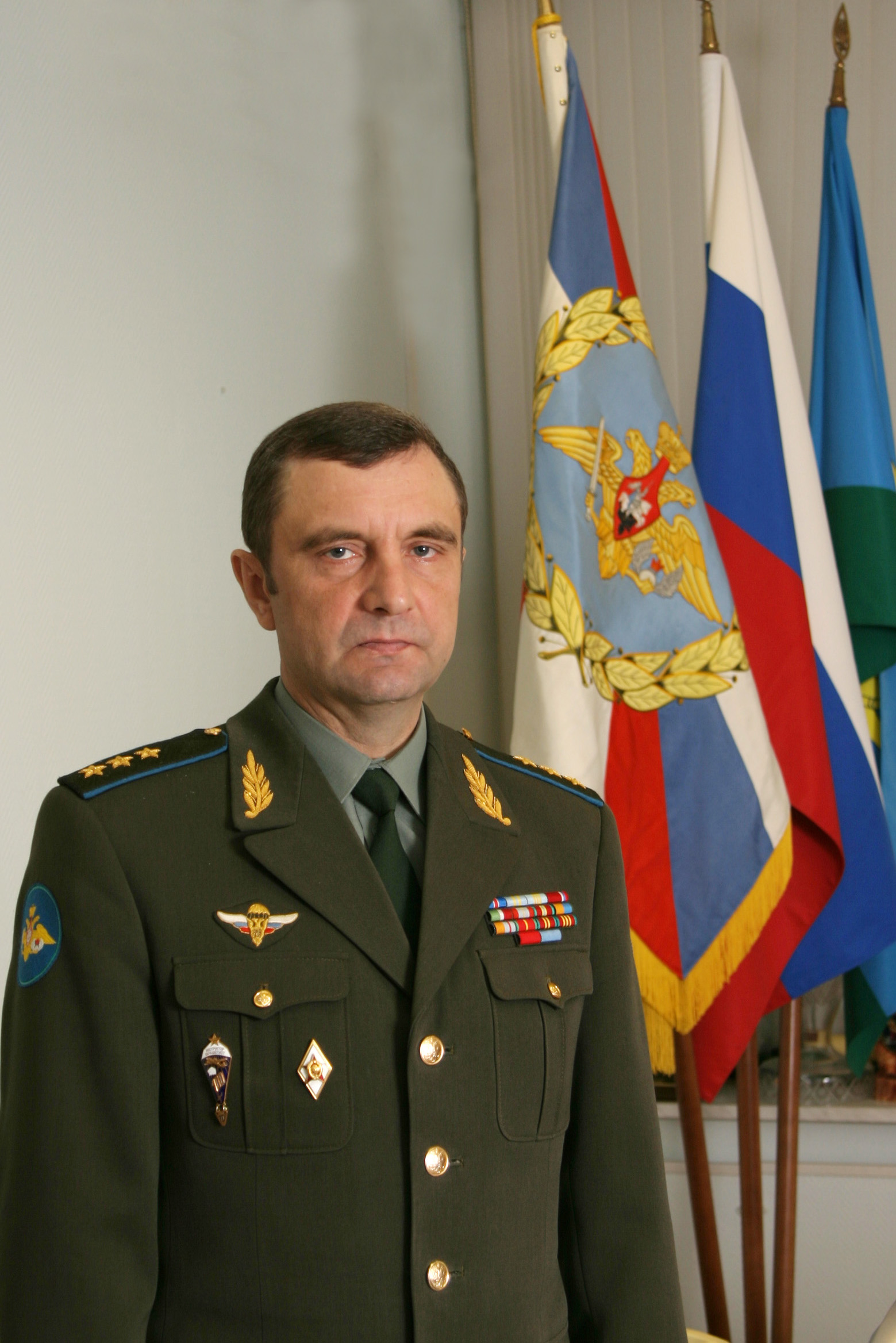
- Kolmakov in 2006

First Deputy Minister of Defense
- In office 25 September 2007 – 21 June 2010
- President: 2007-2008 Vladimir Putin Dmitry Medvedev
- Minister: Anatoly Serdyukov
- Preceded by: Aleksandr Belousov
- Succeeded by: Vladimir Popovkin

Personal details
- Born: 31 July 1955 (age 71) Kaliningrad, Moscow Oblast, Russian SFSR, Soviet Union
- Education: Ryazan Guards Higher Airborne Command School; Frunze Military Academy; General Staff Academy

Military service
- Allegiance: Soviet Union (to 1991); Russia
- Branch/service: Soviet Airborne Forces; Russian Airborne Forces
- Years of service: 1976–2010
- Rank: Colonel general
- Commands: Commander of the Russian Airborne Forces; 106th Guards Airborne Division
- Battles/wars: Soviet-Afghan War

Alexander Petrovich Kolmakov (Russian: Александр Петрович Колмаков, born 31 July 1955) is a retired Russian Airborne Forces colonel general who served as the commander of the Airborne Forces from 2003 to 2007. He was also the First Deputy Minister of Defense from 2007 to 2010.

== Early life and education ==
Alexander Kolmakov was born on 31 July 1955 in Kaliningrad (modern-day Korolyov, Moscow Oblast), in the Russian SFSR of the Soviet Union. He attended the Ussuriysk Suvorov Military School in Ussuriysk, Primorsky Krai, and went on to graduate from the Ryazan Guards Higher Airborne Command School in 1976. His later military education included the Frunze Military Academy, graduating in 1985, and the General Staff Academy in 1995.

== Military career ==
After being commissioned in the Soviet Airborne Forces (VDV) his first post was in the 357th Guards Parachute Regiment of the 103rd Guards Airborne Division, stationed in Vitebsk, Byelorussian SSR. He commanded a reconnaissance platoon and an airborne training company before being deployed to Afghanistan in December 1979 at the start of the Soviet-Afghan War. Kolmakov remained there until December 1981, returning to the Soviet Union as a battalion chief of staff in the 301st Training Parachute Regiment, 44th Training Airborne Division, in Gaižiūnai, Lithuanian SSR.

In 1985 he was briefly a battalion commander in the 108th Guards Parachute Regiment, 7th Guards Division, before later that year becoming the deputy commander of the 300th Guards Parachute Regiment, 98th Guards Airborne Division, in Kishinev, Moldovan SSR. From September 1986 to October 1989 he was the regimental commander, and then until February 1991 Kolmakov was the deputy commander of the 98th Division.

Between February 1991 and August 1993 he commanded the 106th Guards Airborne Division. The 1991 Soviet coup attempt occurred during his time as the division commander. On 19 August 1991, Kolmakov brought paratroopers into Moscow to protect the building of the Supreme Soviet of Russia, on the orders of Defense Minister Dmitry Yazov, one of the coup plotters, and a deputy commander of the Airborne Forces, Alexander Lebed. The division later supported Boris Yeltsin.

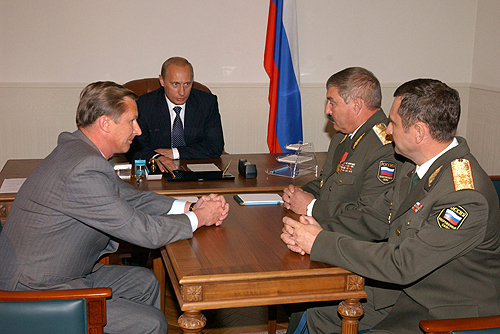
Kolmakov with President Vladimir Putin, Sergei Ivanov, and Georgy Shpak, 2003

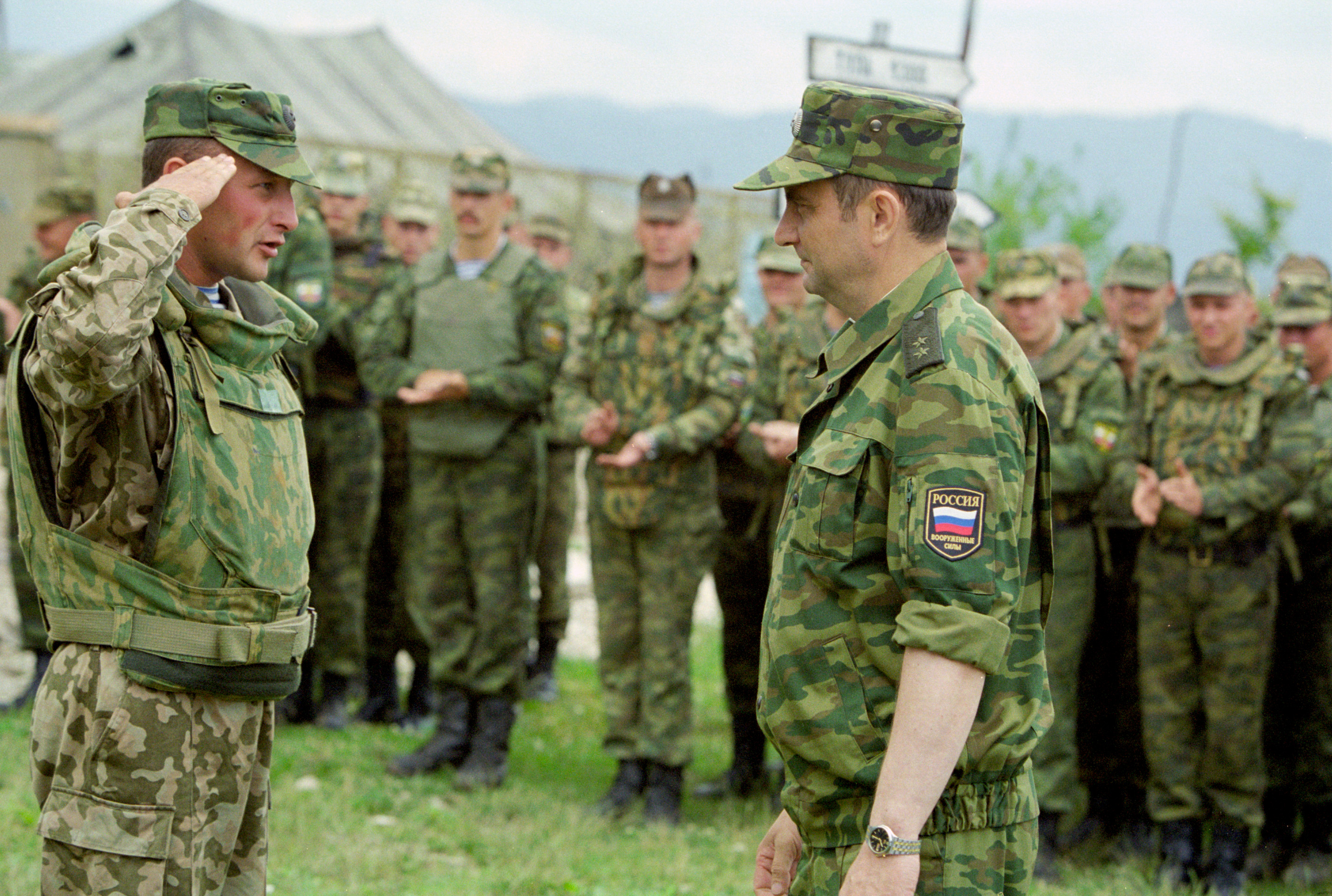
Kolmakov (right) as VDV commander in 2004

After graduating from the General Staff Academy, from 1995 to 1998 he was deputy commander of the 22nd Guards Combined Arms Army in the Moscow Military District, and then deputy commander of the Far Eastern Military District from 2000 to 2003.

On 8 September 2003 Kolmakov became the commander of the Russian Airborne Forces, succeeding Colonel General Georgy Shpak, and held that office until 25 September 2007, when he was appointed first deputy minister of defense, succeeding Colonel General Aleksandr Belousov. Kolmakov was chosen for the role of Airborne Forces commander out several other candidates, at a time when there was a strong push to have the branch be absorbed by the Russian Ground Forces, and when he was formally appointed by President Vladimir Putin he pledged to strengthen the traditions of the VDV.

Kolmakov was also promoted to the rank of colonel general in December 2004. As deputy defense minister, he worked with Minister of Defense Anatoly Serdyukov. He was released from military service on 21 June 2010.

== Later work ==
Kolmakov was on the board of "Almaz-Antey" from 2011 to 2014. On 17 September 2014 he was elected chairman of DOSAAF of Russia, succeeding the retired general Sergey Mayev, and was reelected to another term in December 2019. After his second term, he was succeeded by Aleksandr Dvornikov in January 2024.

== Personal life ==
He is married and has one son.

== Awards ==
- Order "For Merit to the Fatherland", 4th class
- Order of Military Merit
- Order for Service to the Homeland in the Armed Forces of the USSR, 2nd and 3rd classes

Military offices
Preceded by Alexander Lebed	Commander of the 106th Guards Airborne Division; 1991–1993	Succeeded by Yevgeny Savilov
Preceded by ???	Chief of Staff and First Deputy Commander of the 22nd Combined Arms Army; 1995–1998	Succeeded by Aleksandr Postnikov
Preceded by Yevgeny Abrashin	Commander of the 36th Combined Arms Army; 1998–2000	Succeeded by Khakim Mirzazyanov
Preceded by Anatoly Nutrikhin	Deputy Commander of the Far Eastern Military District; 2000–2003	Succeeded by ???
Preceded by Georgy Shpak	Commander of the Russian Airborne Forces; 2003–2007	Succeeded by Valery Yevtukhovich
Political offices
Preceded by Aleksandr Belousov	First Deputy Minister of Defense; 2007–2010	Succeeded by Vladimir Popovkin
Civic offices
Preceded by Sergey Mayev	Chairman of DOSAAF of Russia; 2014–2024	Succeeded by Aleksandr Dvornikov
