= Kontsevoy =

Kontsevoy or Kantsavy (Belarusian: Канцавы, Russian: Концевой) is a surname of Slavic-language origin. It may refer to:

- Anatoly Kontsevoy (born 1968), a Russian Airborne Forces officer
- Artem Kontsevoy (footballer, born 1983) (born 1983), a Belarusian footballer
- Artem Kontsevoy (footballer, born 1999) (born 1999), a Belarusian footballer
- Sergey Kontsevoy (born 1986), a Belarusian footballer
