= 108th Guards Kuban Cossack Air Assault Regiment =

108th Guards Air Assault Regiment
- Active: 1948–present
- Country: Soviet Union (1948–1991); Russia (1992–present)
- Branch: Soviet airborne (1948–1991); Russian Airborne Troops (1992–present)
- Part of: 7th Guards Airborne Division
- Garrison/HQ: Novorossiysk
- Engagements: Warsaw Pact invasion of Czechoslovakia First Chechen War; War in Dagestan; Second Chechen War Invasion of Ukraine
- Decorations: Order of the Red Star
- Battle honours: Kuban Cossacks

Commanders
- Current commander: ?
- Notable commanders: Dmitry Sukhorukov

The 108th Guards Kuban Cossack Air Assault Regiment is a regiment of the Russian Airborne Troops' 7th Guards Airborne Division, based at Novorossiysk. The regiment fought in the suppression of the Hungarian Revolution of 1956, the Warsaw Pact invasion of Czechoslovakia, the War in Abkhazia, the First Chechen War, the War of Dagestan and the Second Chechen War, and the Invasion of Ukraine of 2022.

== History ==
The regiment was formed on 20 September 1948 from the 1st Airborne Battalion of the 322nd Guards Air Landing Regiment of the 103rd Guards Airborne Division in Polotsk. After the formation, the 108th was moved to Kaunas and became part of the 7th Guards Airborne Division. On 17 July 1949, the regiment was presented with its battle flag.

The regiment fought in the crushing of the Hungarian Revolution of 1956, Operation Whirlwind. On 3 November, it air-assaulted into Tököl.

On 23 February 1968, the regiment was awarded the Order of the Red Star. In August 1968, the regiment fought in Operation Danube, the crushing of the Prague Spring. On 20 August, it landed in the Prague area.

On 23 June 1969, the 6th Airborne Company boarded an An-12BP transport to take a flight to display their BMD-1 infantry vehicles to Defence Minister Andrei Grechko. The transport collided with an Aeroflot Ilyushin Il-14M over Yukhnov. All 91 paratroopers and 5 crew in the An-12BP, and 24 people in the Il-14M were killed.

During exercises in 1972, the regiment displayed courage and valor, for which it was awarded the pennant of the Minister of Defence. On 29 October 1978, the regiment was given the honorific "60th Anniversary of the Komsomol" for its high performance in an exercise marking the 60th anniversary of the Komsomol. The regiment participated in the "Zapad-84" exercises and was awarded the pennant of the Minister of Defence for its actions. During 1988 and 1989, it conducted operations in the Transcaucasian Military District. In 1993, the regiment fought in the War in Abkhazia.

In 1993, the regiment moved to Maykop. A year later it moved to Novorossiysk and was awarded the honorific "Kuban Cossack". Between 1995 and 1996, the regiment fought in the First Chechen War. In 1996, it returned to Abkhazia. In August 1999, the regiment fought in the War in Dagestan. It fought in the Battle of Oslinoye Ukho mountain during the war. Between 2000 and 2003, the regiment fought in the Second Chechen War.

The regiment took part in the Russian invasion of Ukraine in 2022 and lost its commander, Colonel Vitaly Vladimirovich Sukuev in September 2022, as well as the commander of the second battalion tactical group, Lieutenant Colonel Alexander Sergeevich Lopin in October the same year. In September 2023 the regiment was deployed at the Southern theatre around the village of Verbove.

== Commanders ==
The regiment was commanded by the following officers.

- Colonel Pyotr Sukhinov (1948–1949)
- Colonel Pyotr Burygin (1949–1951)
- Colonel Alexander Kuznetsov (1951–1954)
- Colonel Nikolai Bolshakov (1954–1956)
- Colonel Anatoly Polushkin (1956–1957)
- Colonel Vladimir Uzdovsky (1957–1958)
- Colonel Dmitri Sukhorukov (1958–1961)
- Colonel Valentin Kostylev (1961–1963)
- Colonel Vladimir Hubarevich (1963–1965)
- Major Gennady Margelov (1965–1966)
- Colonel Vasily Panavin (1966–1967)
- Colonel Alexey Sokolov (1967–1969)
- Colonel Vladimir Marchenko (1969–1970)
- Colonel Vladimir Kraev (1970–1972)
- Colonel Grigory Medvedev (1972–1974)
- Colonel Vladimir Lebedev (1974–1975)
- Colonel Yevgeny Chernov (1975–1977)
- Major Osvaldas Pikauskas (1977–1979)
- Colonel Valentin Bogdanchikov (1979–1981)
- Colonel Anatoly Ilyin (1981–1983)
- Colonel Vyacheslav Khalilov (1983–1984)
- Colonel Vladimir Denisov (1984–1985)
- Colonel Alexander Filippov (1985–1988)
- Colonel Yevgeny Lobachev (1988–1989)
- Colonel Ivan Babichev (1989–1992)
- Colonel Alexander Kozyukov (1992–1995)
- Colonel Igor Dmytryk (1995–1997)
- Colonel Vladimir Tretyak (1997–2000)
- Colonel Alexander Vyaznikov (2000–2002)
- Colonel Pavel Kabal (2002–2004)
- Colonel Pyotr Dmitrievich Kalyn (2004–2005)
- Colonel Sergey Ivanovich Baran (2005–2010)
- Colonel Aleksandr Vyacheslavovich Dembitzkiy
- Colonel Murat Nazarovich Baykulov (2013–2015)
- Colonel Andrey Vladimirovich Kondrashkin (2015–2019)
- Colonel Andrey Aleksandrovich Kutzan' (2019–2020)
- Colonel Sergey Nikolaevich Evpamiliev (2020–04.2022)
- Colonel Vitaly Vladimirovich Sukuev (04.2022–09.2022)
