= Georgy Shpak =

Russian politician and retired lieutenant general

- Георгий Шпак
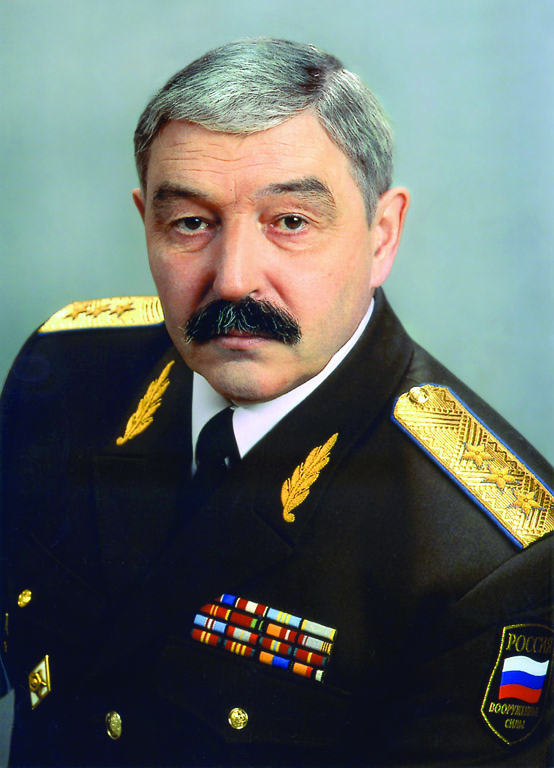
- Shpak in 1997

4th Governor of Ryazan Oblast
- In office 12 April 2004 – 12 April 2008
- Preceded by: Vyacheslav Lyubimov
- Succeeded by: Oleg Kovalyov

2nd Commander of the Russian Airborne Forces
- In office 4 December 1996 – 10 September 2003
- Preceded by: Yevgeny Podkolzin
- Succeeded by: Alexander Kolmakov

Personal details
- Born: 8 September 1943 (age 83) Asipovichy, Byelorussian SSR, Soviet Union (now Belarus)

Military service
- Allegiance: Soviet Union (to 1991); Russia
- Branch/service: Soviet Airborne Forces; Russian Airborne Forces
- Years of service: 1966–2003
- Rank: Lieutenant general
- Commands: 350th Guards Airborne Regiment; 6th Army; Turkestan Military District; Volga Military District; Commander of the Russian Airborne Forces
- Battles/wars: Soviet–Afghan War; Yugoslav Wars; First Chechen War; Second Chechen War

Georgy Ivanovich Shpak (Russian: Георгий Иванович Шпак; born 8 September 1943) is a retired Russian Airborne Forces colonel general. He finished his military career as the commander of the Russian Airborne Forces from 1996 to 2003, and afterwards he was governor of Ryazan Oblast from 2004 to 2008.

== Early life ==
Shpak was born 8 September 1943, in Asipovichy, Belarus, then part of the Soviet Union, to Ivan Antonovich Shpak, who worked the railroad during his lifetime, and Anna Akimovna Shpak, who worked as an accountant.

He enrolled and graduated from the Minsk Railway School majoring in locomotive engineering, locksmithing and as an electrician for locomotives.

== Military career ==
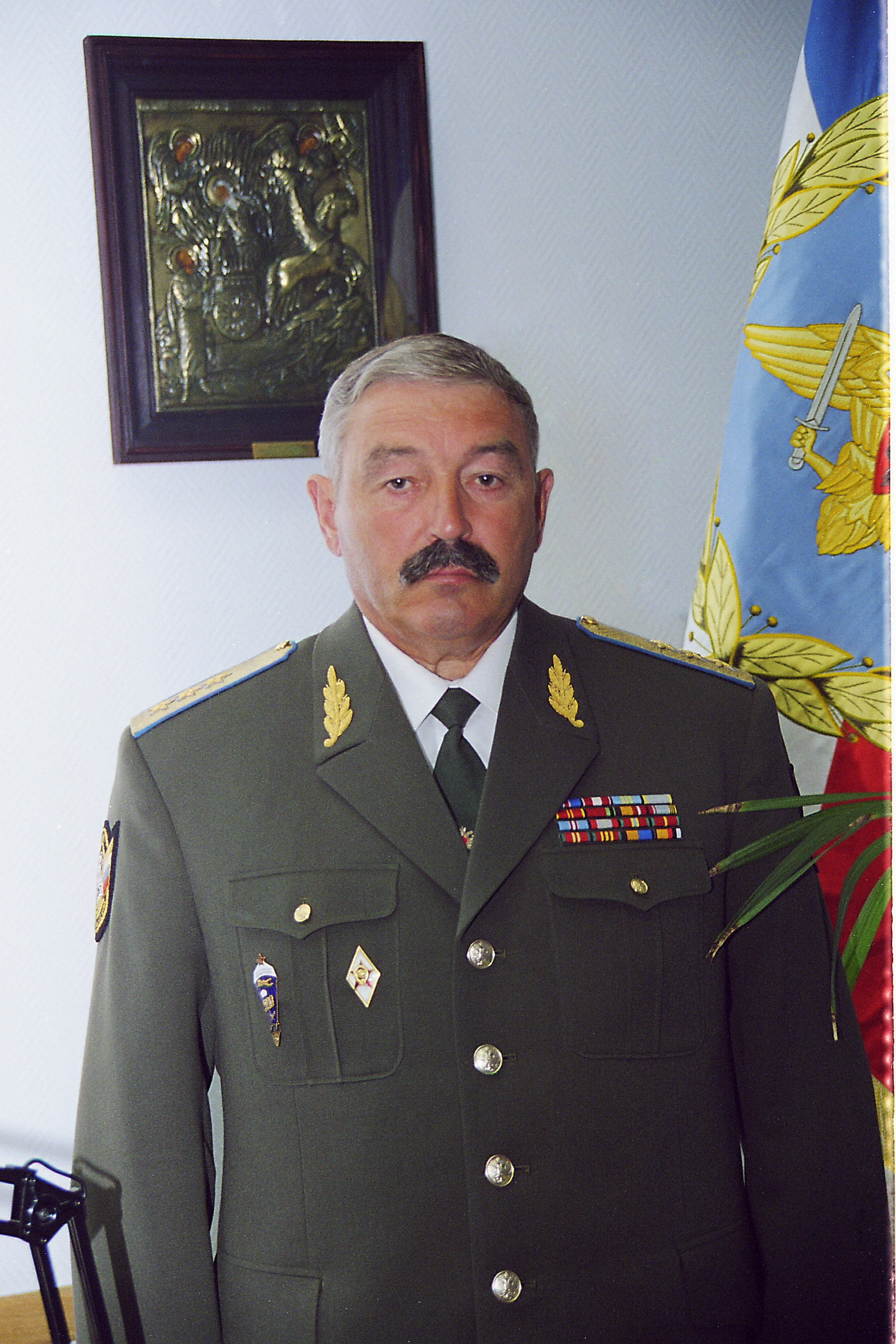
Georgy Shpak as commander of the Russian Airborne Forces

Shpak served as a soldier for six months in the 137th Guards Airborne Regiment in Ryazan, then entered the Ryazan Higher Airborne Command School, from which he graduated with honors in 1966 and was appointed commander of the cadet platoon.

In 1970 he became a company commander of cadets at the school, and in 1973 he became lecturer at the department of tactics. Six months later he was appointed battalion commander in the 44th Airborne Training Division in the Baltic area.

After graduating in 1978 from the M. V. Frunze Military Academy. Shpak commanded the famous 350th Guards Airborne Regiment and deployed with it to Afghanistan on December 25, 1979.

He participated in combat operations in the Republic of Afghanistan (as commander of the 350th Guards Airborne Regiment), Yugoslavia and Chechnya.

After graduating in 1988 from the Military Academy of the General Staff, he became the first deputy commander of a Combined Arms Army in the Odessa Military District.

=== District commands ===
In 1989, Shpak became the commander of the 6th Army of the Leningrad Military District, and was later the chief of staff and first deputy commander of the Turkestan Military District. Since 1992 he was chief of staff to the first deputy commander of the Volga Military District. From 4 December 1996 to 8 September 2003, he was Commander of the Russian Airborne Forces.

== Retirement and political career ==
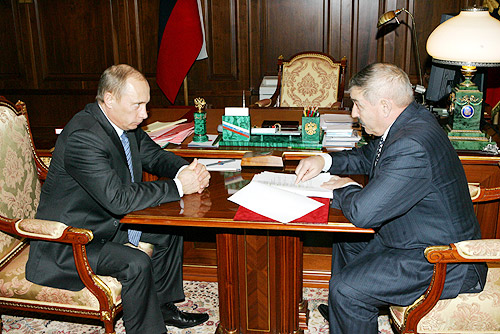
President Vladimir Putin with Shpak in 2006

In September 2003, after leaving the military service, he announced his intention to engage in politics and joined the people's patriotic bloc, and later - the Rodina party, in which he remained until October 2004. On 7 December 2003, was reelected to the Federal Assembly of Russia, where he became deputy chairman of the Defense Committee. In March 2004, ahead of the opponent in the second round, scored 53.5% of the votes and was elected governor of the Ryazan Oblast, where he remained until 2008.

== Citations and orders ==
=== Orders ===
- Order "For Merit to the Fatherland" IV degree
- Order of Military Merit
- Order of the Red Banner
- Order for Service to the Homeland in the Armed Forces of the USSR – III degree
- Order of St. Vladimir – III degree

=== Medals ===
- "Medal for Battle Merit"
- Medal "Army General Margelov" (Ministry of Defense)

=== Certificates ===
- Russian Federation Presidential Certificate of Honour

=== Local awards ===
- Order "National Glory"(Moscow)
- Order "For the revival of Russia in the 21st Century" international competition "Pilar" (Foundation" Unity leaders of the domestic production in small, medium and large businesses", Moscow)
- Medal "For faultless work " (non-profit partnership "Coordination Center of security and detective agencies", Ryazan)
- Order of the "Holy Emperor Nicholas II" 2nd degree (League revive the traditions of the Russian monarchy, Moscow)
- Order of the Holy Prince Peter and Fevronia degree I (Regional Public Organization in strengthening marriage and family "People's Club" Family") "for military feat in saving lives and families"

=== Honorary titles ===
- Honorary citizen of Osipovichi
- Distinguished graduate Samara State Aerospace University (KuAI-SGAU)

== Personal life ==
He is married to his wife, Alla, with whom he has a son, Guards Lieutenant Oleg, who was killed in 1995, in the First Chechen War and daughter, Yelena, who achieved the rank of colonel of medical service (Burdenko Main Military Clinical Hospital). He has three grandchildren, Oleg, Anna and Alexander.

In December 2011, he published a biographical book General Georgy Shpak, written by a friend and colleague, Boris Kostin.

Political offices
Preceded by Vyacheslav Lyubimov	Governor of Ryazan Oblast; 2004–2008	Succeeded by Oleg Kovalyov
Military offices
Preceded by Yevgeny Podkolzin	Commander of the Russian Airborne Forces; 1996–2003	Succeeded by Alexander Kolmakov
Preceded by Leonid Maiorov	Chief of Staff and First Deputy Commander of the Volga–Ural Military District; 1992–1996	Succeeded by Aleksandr Baranov
Preceded by Vladimir Denisov	Chief of Staff of the Turkestan Military District; 1991–1992	Succeeded by District abolished
Preceded by Leonid Kovalyov	Commander of the 6th Army; 1989–1991	Succeeded by Yuri Yakubov
