= Yelena Bibikova =

Russian politician (born 1956)

- Елена Бибикова
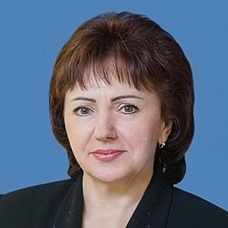

Russian Federation Senator from Pskov Oblast
- In office 25 September 2014 – 28 September 2023
- Preceded by: Mikhail Margelov
- Succeeded by: Alexey Naumets

Personal details
- Born: Yelena Bibikova; 23 September 1956 (age 69) Krasnodar Krai, Russian Soviet Federative Socialist Republic, Soviet Union
- Party: United Russia
- Education: Financial University under the Government of the Russian Federation

Yelena Vasilyevna Bibikova (Russian: Елена Васильевна Бибикова; born 23 September 1956) is a Russian politician who was a senator from Pskov Oblast from September 2014 until September 2023.

== Career ==
In 1975, she graduated from the Armavir Law College. After graduation, she worked as a senior inspector, deputy head, head of the city department of social security in Pskov. From 1991 to 2014, she served as a head of the Pension fund for the Pskov region. In 2004, 2007, and 2011, Bibikova was elected deputy of the Pskov Oblast Assembly of Deputies of the 3rd, 4th, and 5th convocations. In September 2014, she became a senator from Pskov Oblast.

== Sanctions ==
Yelena Bibikova is under personal sanctions introduced by the European Union, the United Kingdom, the USA, Canada, Switzerland, Australia, Ukraine, New Zealand, for ratifying the decisions of the "Treaty of Friendship, Cooperation and Mutual Assistance between the Russian Federation and the Donetsk People's Republic and between the Russian Federation and the Luhansk People's Republic" and providing political and economic support for Russia's annexation of Ukrainian territories.

== Awards ==
- 2018 - The Order of Friendship
- 2007 - Medal of the Order of Merit for the Fatherland, II degree
- 2020 - Certificate of Honor of the Government of the Russian Federation

== Family ==
She is married and has two daughters.
