= Anatoly Kontsevoy =

Belarusian-born Russian army chief (born 1968)

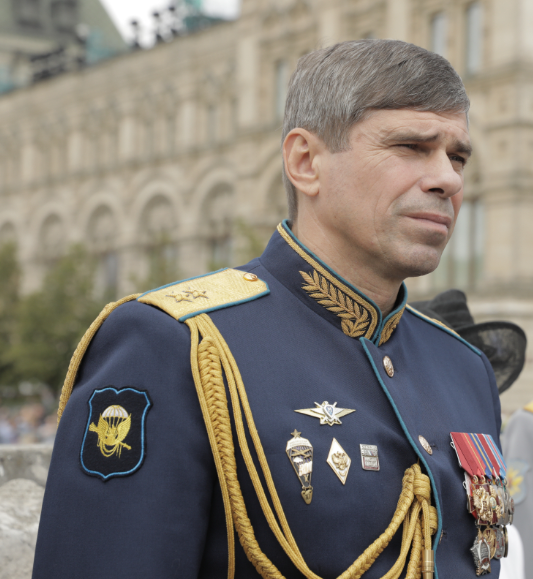
- Kontsevoy in 2024
- Native name: Анатолий Георгиевич Концевой
- Born: 8 September 1968 (age 57); Gomel Oblast, Belarusian SSR, Soviet Union
- Allegiance: Soviet Union (to 1991); Russia
- Branch: Soviet Airborne Forces; Russian Airborne Forces
- Service years: 1989–present
- Rank: Lieutenant General
- Commands: 45th Guards Spetsnaz Brigade
- Education: Ryazan Guards Higher Airborne Command School; Combined Arms Academy of the Armed Forces of the Russian Federation; Military Academy of the General Staff of the Armed Forces of Russia

Lieutenant General Anatoly Georgiyevich Kontsevoy (Note: Russian: Анатолий Георгиевич Концевой) (born 8 September 1968) is a Belarusian-born Russian Airborne Forces officer who has served as a deputy chief of the General Staff of the Russian Armed Forces since 2025. He was previously the Chief of Staff and First Deputy Commander of the Airborne Forces from 2022 to 2025, and the Deputy Commander and from 2019 to 2022.

== Early life and education ==
Kontsevoy was born in 1968 in Gomel Region, Byelorussian SSR, Soviet Union. He graduated from the Ryazan Guards Higher Airborne Command School in 1989.

== Military career ==
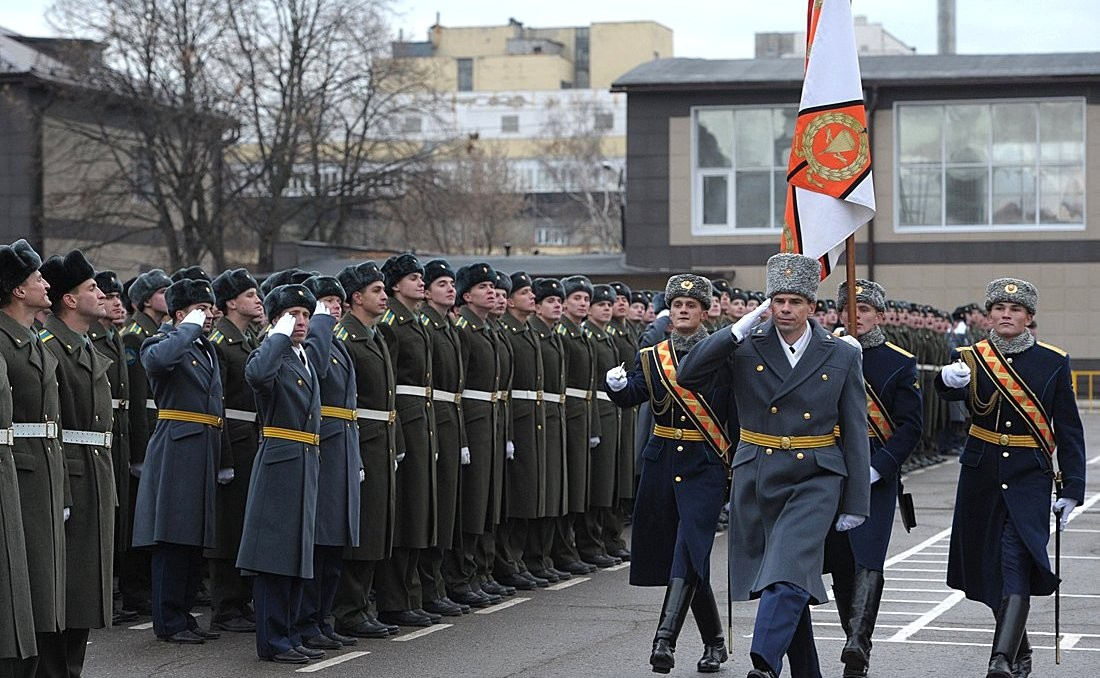
Kontsevoy at the Ryazan Airborne Command School, 2013

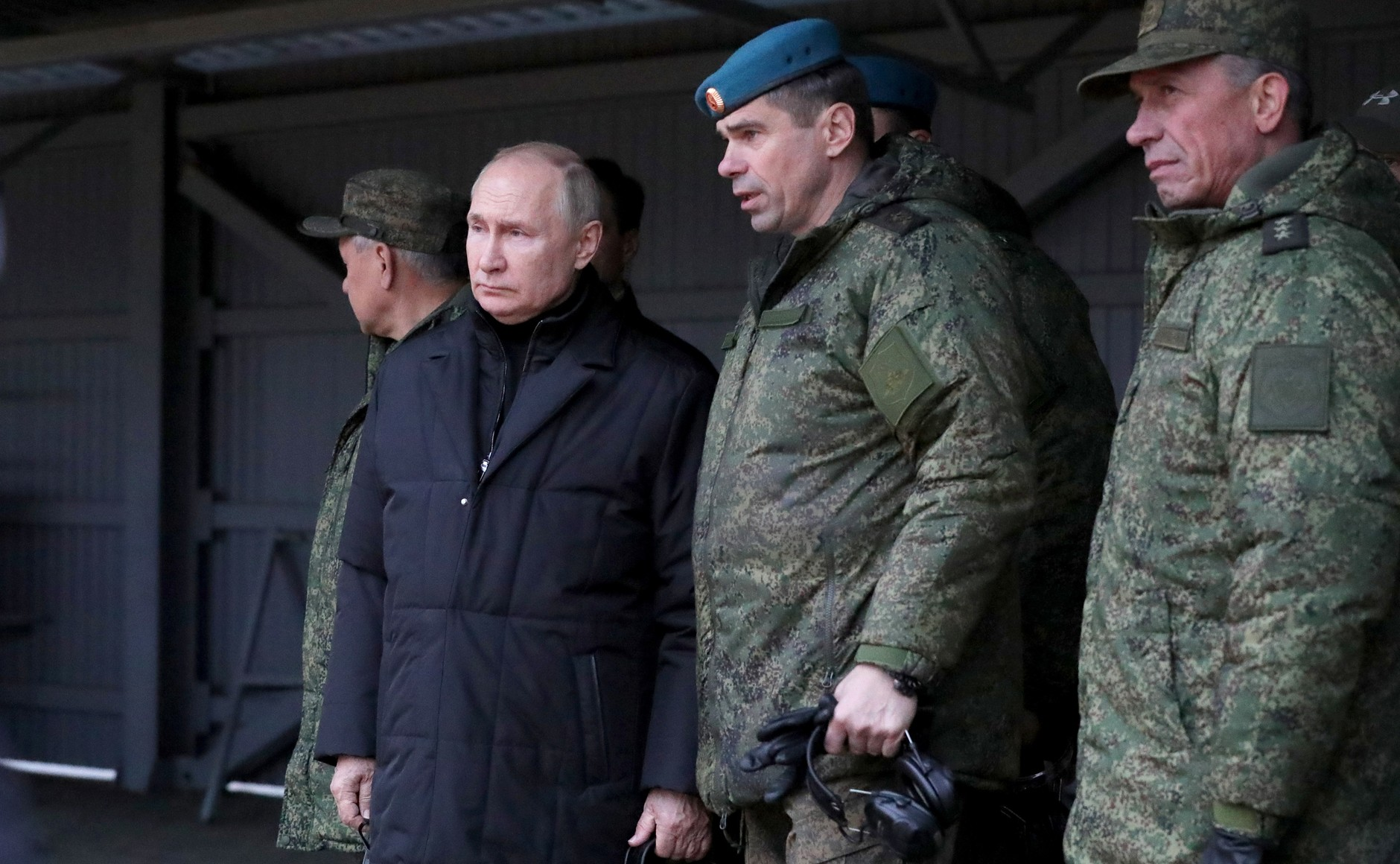
Kontsevoy with President Vladimir Putin, 2022

Between 1989 and 2001 he held commands at the platoon, company, and battalion level, before being appointed as the commander of the 45th Guards Spetsnaz Brigade, a post he held from 2002 to 2006. Kontsevoy graduated from the Combined Arms Academy of the Armed Forces of the Russian Federation in 2008.

Kontsevoy was the deputy director of the Ryazan Guards Higher Airborne Command School from 2008 to 2012, and from 14 September 2012 until 2 September 2017, he was the director of the school. Starting in 2017 he attended the Military Academy of the General Staff of the Armed Forces of Russia.

Kontsevoy became the deputy commander of the Airborne Forces in 2019, after graduating from the General Staff Academy, and in June 2022 became the chief of staff and first deputy commander. As of November 2025, he was serving as a deputy chief of the General Staff, and had been succeeded as Airborne Forces chief of staff by Aleksandr Kornev.

== Awards ==
- Order "For Merit to the Fatherland", 2nd class
- Order of Courage
- Order of Military Merit
- Order "For Personal Courage"

== Notes ==
Military offices
Preceded by Viktor Kolygin	Commander of the 45th Guards Spetsnaz Brigade; 2002–2006	Succeeded by Aleksandr Shulishov
Preceded by Andrey Krasov	Director of the Ryazan Guards Higher Airborne Command School; 2012–2017	Succeeded by Aleksey Ragozin
Preceded by Andrei Kholzakov	Deputy Commander of the Russian Airborne Forces; 2019–2022	Succeeded by Alexei Naumets
Preceded by Yevgeny Ustinov	Chief of Staff and First Deputy Commander of the Russian Airborne Forces; 2022–2025	Succeeded by Aleksandr Kornev
