= Vitaly Raevsky =

Ukrainian major general

Vitaliy Anatoliovich Raevskiy Віталій Анатолійович Раєвський
- Born: February 25, 1949; Khyriv, Lviv Oblast, Ukrainian SSR, Soviet Union
- Died: November 17, 2014 (aged 65)
- Military career
- Allegiance: Soviet Union (to 1991); Ukraine
- Branch: Soviet Airborne Forces; Ukrainian Airmobile Forces
- Service years: 1962–1998
- Rank: Major General
- Units: 56th Air Assault Brigade; 38th Guards Air Assault Brigade; Airborne Division of Northern Group of Forces
- Conflicts: Soviet–Afghan War

Vitaliy Anatoliovich Raevskiy (Ukrainian: Віталій Анатолійович Раєвський, romanized: Vitalii Anatoliiovych Raievskyi; February 25, 1949 – 17 November 2014) was a Ukrainian major general of the reserves, who formerly formed and commanded all of the Ukrainian Airmobile Forces and before then was in the Soviet Airborne Troops.

From 1993 to 1998 he was the commander of the Ukrainian Airmobile Forces.

== Early career ==
Vitaliy Anatoliovich Raevskiy was born on February 25, 1949, in Khyriv, Lviv oblast Ukraine.

== Education ==
In 1966 Vitaliy Raevskiy began his education at the Odesa Artillery Institute, where he graduated in 1969.

During the 1978–1981 he attended Frunze Military Academy.

He also attended Voroshilov Military Academy of the USSR Army General Staff from 1989 until 1991.

== Assignments ==
- 1985–1987 – 56th Air Assault Brigade
- Airborne Division of Northern Group of Forces
- 2001-2002 - 242nd Training Centre
- Organized Ukrainian Airmobile Forces

== Awards and decorations ==
Vitaliy Anatoliovich Raevskiy earned the following decorations and awards:

- Order of the Red Banner
- Order of the Red Star
- Order for Service to the Homeland in the Armed Forces of the USSR Third Class
- Order of Bohdan Khmelnytsky – Second Class
- Order of Bohdan Khmelnytsky – Third Class
- The Presentational Fire-Arm decoration – a Fort 12 pistol

Military offices
Preceded by Nikolai Staskov	Commander of the 242nd Training Centre; 1991–1992	Succeeded by Valery Yevtukhovich
Preceded by Viktor Savechko	Commander of the Ukrainian Airmobile Forces; 1993–1998	Succeeded by Ivan Yakubets
