= Alexey Naumets =

Russian Airborne Troops major general (born 1968)

- Алексей Наумец
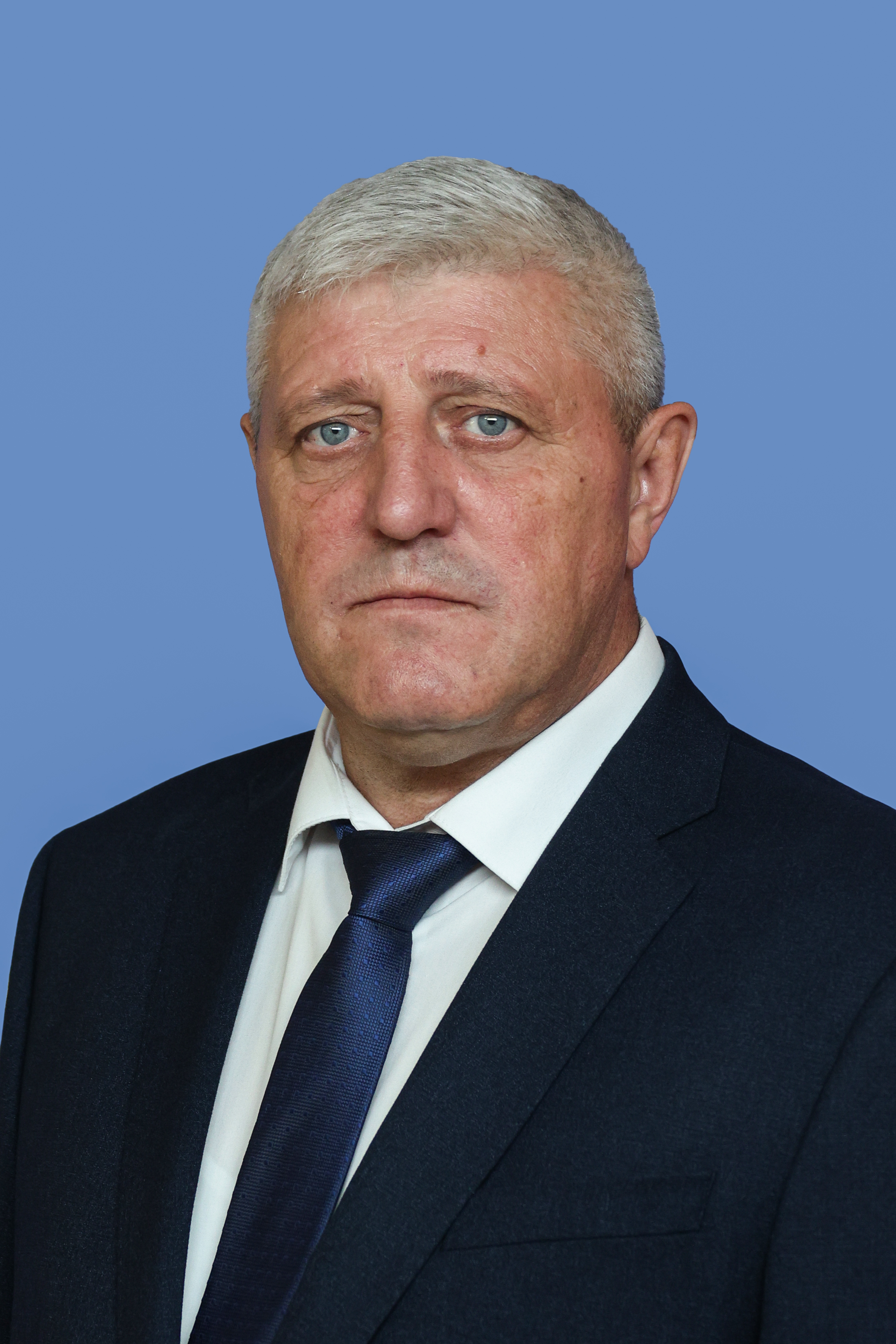
- Official portrait

Russian Federation Senator from Pskov Oblast
- Incumbent
- Assumed office 28 September 2023
- Preceded by: Yelena Bibikova

Personal details
- Born: 11 February 1968 (age 58)
- Party: United Russia
- Awards: Order of Military Merit

Military service
- Allegiance: Soviet Union (to 1991); Russia
- Branch/service: Soviet Airborne Forces; Russian Airborne Forces
- Years of service: 1986–2023
- Rank: Major general
- Commands: 106th Guards Airborne Division; 76th Guards Air Assault Division
- Battles/wars: Second Chechen War; Russo-Georgian War; Russo-Ukrainian War; Annexation of Crimea; Russian invasion of Ukraine; Battle of the Svatove–Kreminna line

Alexey Vasilievich Naumets (Russian: Алексей Васильевич Наумец; born 11 February 1968) is a Russian politician and former army officer who is last ranked as a major general, currently serving as a Senator of Pskov Oblast since 2023.

He served with the airborne troops from 1986 and fought in the Second Chechen War and Russo-Georgian War. Naumets was severely injured in a car accident with Russian Airborne Troops commander Vladimir Shamanov in October 2010 while acting commander of the 106th Guards Airborne Division. In February 2013, he was appointed commander of the 76th Guards Air Assault Division at Pskov. He was promoted to major general in June 2014. Naumets was placed on the European Union sanctions list in September 2014 for his command of the 76th Guards Air Assault Division in Crimea.

In April 2022 Naumets was appointed Deputy Commander of the Airborne Forces. In June 2023 he was simultaneously designated by the governor of Pskov Oblast to become a senator, succeeding Yelena Bibikova. He took office as senator on 28 September 2023.

== Military service ==
Naumets graduated from the Ryazan School of Communications in 1986 and was sent to the 103rd Guards Airborne Division at Vitebsk. Naumets was involved in the suppression of the Fergana riots and the Osh riots in 1990. He served in the Second Chechen War with the 247th Air Assault Regiment. In 2005 he became chief of staff of the 104th Guards Air Assault Regiment of the 76th Guards Airborne Division. On 2 June 2007 Naumets was appointed commander of the 247th Air Assault Regiment. He led the regiment in the Russo-Georgian War, where it fought in the Battle of Kodori Gorge. On 24 August 2009 he became chief of staff of the 106th Guards Airborne Division. Naumets became acting commander of the division in July 2010. On 31 October he was seriously injured in a car accident along with Vladimir Shamanov. Division deputy commander Gennady Anashkin took command of the division. After recovering from his injuries Naumets resumed duty as division chief of staff.

On 27 February 2013 Naumets was appointed commander of the 76th Guards Air Assault Division at Pskov. During the spring of 2014 the 76th Division participated in the annexation of Crimea. On 12 June he was promoted to major general.

He was sanctioned by the UK government in 2014 in relation to the Russo-Ukrainian War.

For his leadership of the division in Crimea, Naumets was placed on the European Union sanctions list in September 2014. He was placed on the Canadian sanctions list in February 2015. In late November 2015 Naumets was awarded the Order of Military Merit because the 76th Division was for three consecutive years considered the most efficient airborne detachment.

In February 2018 he was appointed the deputy chief of staff of the Russian Airborne Forces, and in April 2022 he was appointed the deputy commander of the Russian Airborne Forces.

== Personal life ==
Naumets is married to Nelly and has a son, Igor.

Military offices
| Preceded by Igor Vinogradsky | Commander of the 76th Guards Air Assault Division; 2013–2018 | Succeeded by Igor Kaply |
| Preceded by Anatoly Kontsevoy | Deputy Commander of the Russian Airborne Forces; 2022–2023 | Succeeded by Nikolai Choban |
Political offices
| Preceded by Yelena Bibikova | Russian Federation Senator from Pskov Oblast; 2023–present | Incumbent |
