= Nikolai Ignatov (general) =

Russian retired general (b. 1956)

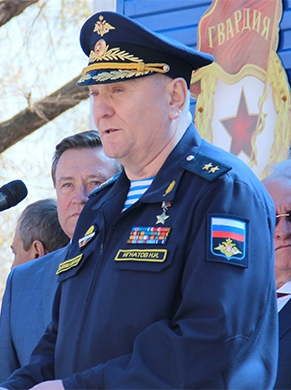
- Ignatov in 2018
- Born: 13 May 1956 (age 70); Dmitriyevskoye, Tula Oblast, Russian SFSR, Soviet Union
- Education: Ryazan Guards Higher Airborne Command School; Frunze Military Academy; Russian General Staff Academy
- Military career
- Allegiance: Soviet Union (to 1991); Russia
- Branch: Soviet Airborne Forces; Russian Airborne Forces
- Service years: 1974–2019
- Rank: Lieutenant General
- Conflicts: Russian constitutional crisis; Incident at Pristina Airport
- Awards: Hero of the Russian Federation

Lieutenant General Nikolai Ivanovich Ignatov (Note: Russian: Никола́й Ива́нович Игна́тов) (born 13 May 1956) is a retired Russian Airborne Forces officer who briefly served as the acting Commander of the Russian Airborne Forces in May 2009. He was the Chief of Staff and First Deputy Commander of the Airborne Forces from 2008 to 2019 and the Deputy Commander of the Airborne Forces from 2005 to 2008.

He was awarded the title Hero of the Russian Federation in 1993 during the events of the Russian constitutional crisis.

== Early life and education ==
Ignatov was born on 13 May 1956 in Dmitriyevskoye, Tula Oblast, Russian SFSR, Soviet Union. He was drafted into the Soviet military in 1974, serving until 1976 in the 337th Parachute Regiment of the 104th Guards Airborne Division in the Azerbaijan SSR. From 1976 to 1980 he attended the Ryazan Guards Higher Airborne Command School.

== Military career ==
After commissioning as an officer of the Soviet Airborne Forces, from 1980 to 1985 he served at the Ryazan School as a training platoon and company commander. He then commanded a battalion in the 328th Parachute Regiment, 104th Guards Airborne Division in Azerbaijan before going to the Frunze Military Academy in 1987. Following his graduation in 1990 Ignatov was deputy commander of the 104th Guards Parachute Regiment and then commander of the 119th Guards Parachute Regiment starting in 1993.

In that role, during the Russian constitutional crisis in October 1993, Ignatov led a group of paratroopers from his regiment near the Russian White House and was later credited by the government with "liquidating an armed takeover attempt." For this action, on 7 October he was awarded the title Hero of the Russian Federation by President Boris Yeltsin.

Starting in 1995 he was deputy commander of the 106th Guards Airborne Division and from 1998 he commanded the 1st Separate Airborne Brigade that was in Bosnia and Herzegovina as part of NATO's Stabilization Force (SFOR). In 1999, he took part in organizing the deployment of paratroopers from the brigade into Kosovo, leading to the incident at Pristina Airport.

In 2001 he graduated from the General Staff Academy and worked on the staff of the commander of the Russian Airborne Forces. From 2002 to 2005 he commanded the 7th Guards Airborne Division, and then was made Deputy Commander of the Airborne Forces. In 2006 he was promoted to lieutenant general and in 2008 he became the Chief of Staff and First Deputy Commander, holding that position until his retirement in 2019. Also during that time, in May 2009, Ignatov was the acting commander of the Russian Airborne Forces.

== Awards and decorations ==
- Hero of the Russian Federation
- Order of Military Merit
- Order of Honour
- Order "For Personal Courage"
- Medal 70 years of the Armed Forces of the USSR
- Zhukov Medal
- Medal "Participant of the march-landing 12 June 1999 Bosnia – Kosovo"
- Medal "For strengthening military cooperation"
- Medal "For distinction in military service" 1st class
- Medal "For impeccable service" 2nd and 3rd classes
- Medal "200 years of the Minister of Defense"
- Medal "70th anniversary of the Soviet Airborne Forces"
- Medal "80 years of the VDV – Nobody but us"
- Medal "Paratrooper brotherhood" 1st class
- NATO Medal "For Service in Yugoslavia"

== Notes ==
Military offices
Preceded by Aleksandr Iskrenko	Commander of the 1st Separate Airborne Brigade; 1998–1999	Succeeded by Vladimir Demidov
Preceded by Yuri Krivosheyev	Commander of the 7th Guards Airborne Division; 2002–2005	Succeeded by Viktor Astapov
Preceded by Valery Yevtukhovich	Deputy Commander of the Russian Airborne Forces; 2005–2008	Succeeded by Yevgeny Ustinov
Preceded by Valery Yevtukhovich	Chief of Staff and First Deputy Commander of the Russian Airborne Forces; 2008–2019	Succeeded by Yevgeny Ustinov
Preceded by Valery Yevtukhovich	Commander of the Russian Airborne Forces; Acting; 2009	Succeeded by Vladimir Shamanov
