= Yevgeny Podkolzin =

Russian military personnel (1936–2003)

Yevgeny Nikolayevich Podkolzin (18 April 1936–19 June 2003) was a Soviet and Russian colonel general who commanded the Soviet and Russian Airborne Forces from 1991 to 1996.

== Biography ==
Yevgeny Nikolayevich Podkolzin was born on 18 April 1936 in the settlement of Lepsinsk in the Kazakh SSR. He graduated from the Alma-Ata Airborne School in 1958, and was posted to the 328th Guards Airborne Regiment as a platoon commander. Between 1963 and 1967, Podkolzin commanded the transport and supply company and the separate reconnaissance company of the 104th Guards Airborne Division. Promoted to command a battalion of the 80th Guards Airborne Regiment in 1968, he was accepted to the Frunze Military Academy in 1970. Upon graduation in 1973, Podkolzin was appointed commander of the 331st Guards Airborne Regiment. He rose to deputy commander of the 106th Guards Airborne Division in 1974 and division commander in 1976. Accepted to the Military Academy of the General Staff in 1980, Podkolzin was appointed first deputy chief of staff of the Soviet Airborne Forces upon his graduation in 1982. He rose to chief of staff and first deputy commander of the airborne forces in 1986. Podkolzin succeeded to command of the Airborne Forces in August 1991, leading them through the transition into the Russian Airborne Forces. Podkolzin was relieved of command of the airborne forces on 4 December 1996.

Podkolzin died aged 68 on 19 June 2003 after an operation.

== Awards ==
Podkolzin was a recipient of the following awards:

- Order of the Red Star
- Order "For Service to the Homeland in the Armed Forces of the USSR" 2nd and 3rd classes
- Order of the Badge of Honour
- Order "For Personal Courage"
- Order of Military Merit
