= Aleksandr Belousov =

Russian general

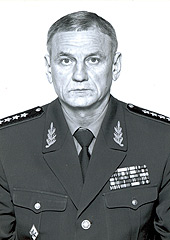
- Born: 8 September 1952 (age 74); Rovno, Ukrainian SSR, Soviet Union
- Military career
- Allegiance: Soviet Union (to 1991); Russia
- Branch: Soviet Army; Russian Ground Forces
- Service years: 1969-2009
- Rank: Army general
- Commands: 35th Combined Arms Army
- Awards: Order of Military Merit (Russia)

Aleksandr Vasilyevich Belousov (Russian: Александр Васильевич Белоусов; born 8 September 1952 in Rovno, Ukrainian SSR) is a retired Russian general and former First Deputy Minister of Defense from 2004 to 2007.

== Biography ==
The son of an officer who took part in the Great Patriotic War. In the Soviet Army since 1969. Graduated from the Moscow Higher Combined Arms Command School (1969–1973), the Frunze Military Academy (1981–1984) and the Military Academy of the General Staff of the Armed Forces of Russia (1993–1995).

He served as commander of a motorized rifle platoon and a motorized rifle company in the Group of Soviet Forces in Germany.

In 1978-1981 he served as chief of staff and commander of a motorized rifle battalion in the Central Asian Military District.

In 1984-1989 he served as commander of a training motorized rifle regiment in the Leningrad Military District (Sertolovo).

In 1989-1991 he was deputy commander and in 1991-1993 commander of the 131st Guards Motorized Rifle (Alakurtti, Kandalaksha, Pechenga). Major General (02/18/1993).

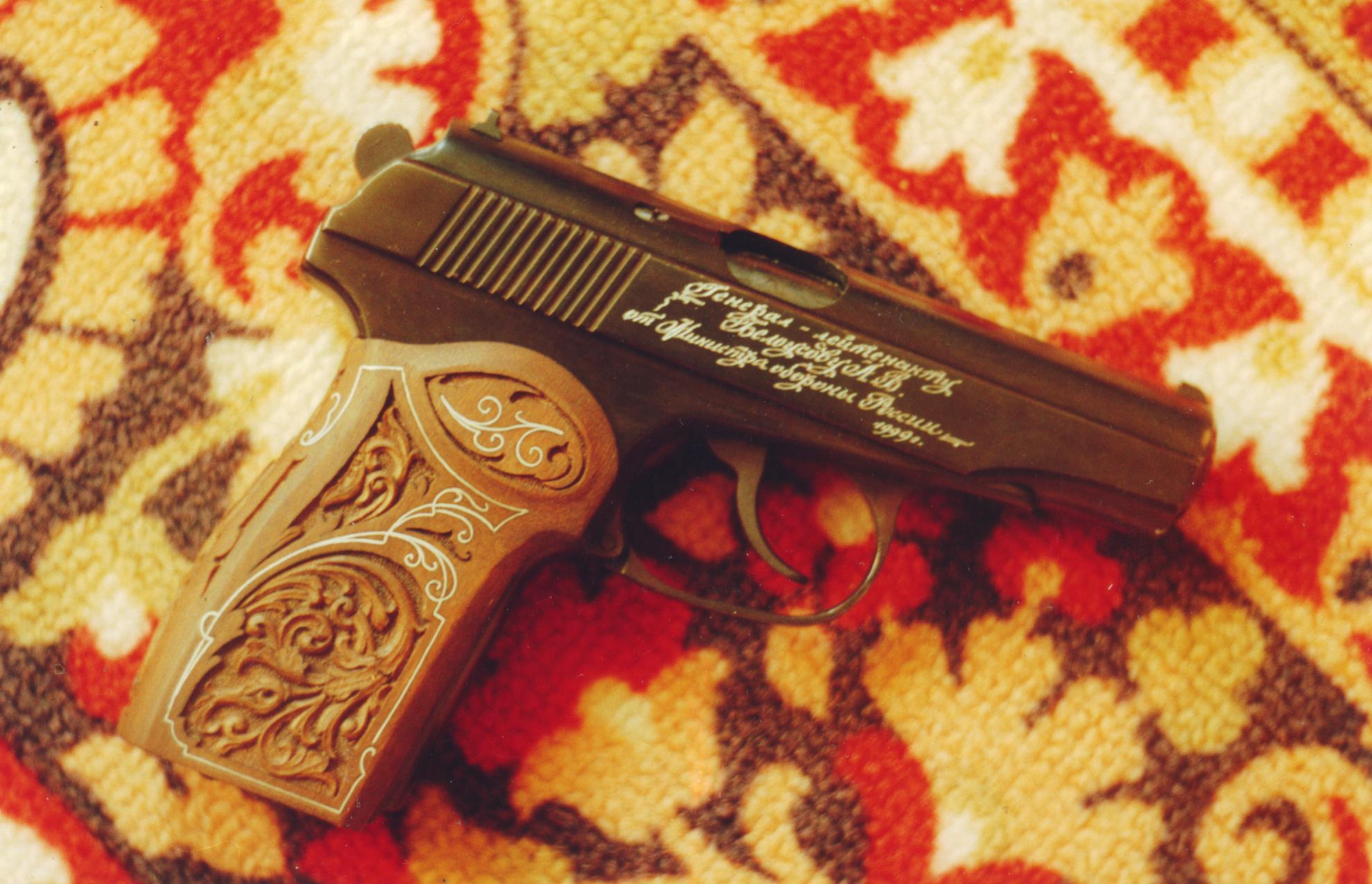
Makarov made honorary pistol awarded to Belousov by Minister of Defense Igor Sergeyev.

From 1995 to 1999, he served in the Far Eastern Military District as deputy commander of the 35th Army for combat training and chief of staff the 1st deputy commander of the 35th Army (Belogorsk), from November 1997 - commander of the 5th combined arms army (Ussuriysk).

From August 1999 to June 2003 he served as Deputy Commander of the Moscow Military District. He repeatedly went on business trips to the Chechen Republic; in 1999, for about 4 months he served as commander of a group of Russian troops in the Chechen Republic.

From June 2003 to July 2004 he served as Deputy Commander of the North Caucasus Military District for Emergency Situations. He was promoted to Colonel General in accordance with a decision dated 6 December 2004.

From July 19, 2004, to September 2007 he was First Deputy Minister of Defense of Russia with responsibility for combat training of troops and military reform. On 12 December 2006 in accordance with a presidential decree signed by President of Russia Vladimir Putin, he received military rank of Army General. He was relieved of his post a few months after the appointment of Anatoly Serdyukov to the post of Minister of Defense.

From September 25, 2007, to November 2009 he served as head of the Military Academy of the General Staff of the Armed Forces of Russia.

In December 2009 he was dismissed. He holds high positions in Rosoboronexport, and is also an inspector in the Group of Inspectors General. He also conducts public work as the President of the Union of Veterans of the Moscow Military District.

He was awarded the Order "For Service to the Homeland in the Armed Forces of the USSR" (III degree), Order "For Merit to the Fatherland" (IV degree) and Order of Military Merit medals, and an award weapon with a Makarov made ceremonial pistol (1999). He is married and has a son and a daughter.
