= 2015 Omsk building collapse =

2015 building collapse in Omsk, Russia

- Location of Omsk Oblast in Russia
- Date: 12 July 2015
- Location: Omsk, Omsk Oblast, Russia; 54.884082°N 73.499203°E
- Deaths: 23
- Injuries: 19

The 2015 Omsk building collapse occurred on 12 July 2015 at a military facility on the outskirts of Omsk, Russia. 23 soldiers died and another 19 were injured after a roof and walls of an army barracks building collapsed at the 242nd Training Centre of the Airborne Forces.

According to an investigative committee, the collapse could likely be attributed to code violations during repairs that were made to the building over the two years preceding the incident. It was believed that one of the building’s load-bearing external walls was weakened by these renovations, and that led to the collapse. The subcontractor carrying out the repairs, the RemEksStroy Company, had a history of doing repair and reconstruction work for the Russian armed forces, and a history of construction law violations.

At the time of the incident, Russian President Vladimir Putin expressed his condolences to the families of the soldiers killed in Omsk and promised to “keep monitoring” the situation.

Following the disaster, Russian authorities launched a major criminal investigation into negligence, abuse of power, and violations of construction safety rules.

The criminal investigation turned into a massive, multi-year legal saga. Following seven years of investigation and legal proceedings, the Omsk Garrison Military Court delivered its final verdicts in August 2022. In total, 11 defendants including military officials, oversight inspectors and construction executives were put on trial. They faced charges ranging from negligence and fraud to abuse of power and building code violations. The primary outcomes of the trial included:

1) Hard Prison Sentences for Key Figures. Colonel Vladislav Parkhomenko, the former deputy commander of the unit, received the harshest punishment. He was sentenced to 10 years in a strict-regime penal colony, stripped of his colonel rank, fined 6 million rubles, and banned from holding official positions for 5 years.The Subcontractor & Project Managers: Alexander Dorofeev (director of the faulty construction company RemEksStroy) and Dmitry Bayazov (the project manager) were sentenced to 6 to 8 years in a general-regime penal colony alongside several engineers and technical supervisors involved in the fraudulent remodeling.

2) Commander Colonel Oleg Ponomarev, the commander of the 242nd Airborne Training Centre, was one of the most heavily scrutinised figures. Immediately after the 2015 tragedy, he publicly accepted moral responsibility for letting the troops sleep in the building, which actually garnered significant public sympathy from the soldiers' parents, who viewed him as a scapegoat for systemic corruption further up the chain. By the time the trial concluded in 2022, Ponomarev avoided prison time. Due to the long delay in bringing the case to a final verdict, the statute of limitations had expired on his primary charge of negligence, leading the court to release him from serving a sentence.

3) The court ordered the convicted individuals to pay collective compensation to the victims and their families for moral damages, with individual payouts ranging between 300,000 and 600,000 rubles per claimant, alongside an overarching 72-million-ruble civil lawsuit filed by the state to recoup the property damages.
