= 242nd Training Centre =

242nd Training Centre (1987–present) 44th Training Airborne Division (1960–1987)
- Founded: 17 September 1960 (as 44th Training Airborne Division)
- Country: Soviet Union (to 1991); Russia
- Type: Training center
- Role: Airborne
- Size: Brigade
- Part of: Soviet Airborne Forces; Russian Airborne Forces
- Garrison/HQ: Omsk
- Anniversaries: 17 September

Commanders
- Current commander: Colonel Vitaly Repin

The 242nd Training Centre of the Airborne Forces (Russian: 242-й учебный центр подготовки младших специалистов Воздушно-десантных войск, lit. '242nd Training Center of Junior Specialists of the Airborne Forces') is a brigade-sized training formation of the Russian Airborne Troops.

== History ==
=== Cold War ===
In March 1959 the 44th Motor Rifle Division was disbanded.

To prepare sergeants and junior specialists for airborne units in accordance with a directive of the Commander Soviet Ground Forces, the 44th Training Airborne Division was formed in July–October 1960 in Ostrov and Cheryokha, in Pskov Oblast. The Deputy Commander of the Airborne Troops, Lieutenant-General Vasily Margelov, supervised the division's formation. The formation's birthday is 17 September, when the formation of the division was completed and Major General N.G. Zharenov assumed command. The division was formed from the 17th Airborne Training Centre at Dyatkovo, the 78th Separate Self-Propelled Artillery Training Battalion at Kaunas, and the 11th School for Junior Specialists of the Medical Service at Ostrov.

The vast majority of officers had experience in training units of the regimental schools, which had been disbanded at the same time. Among the officers selected to staff the training centre were 131 veterans of the Great Patriotic War.

The division consisted of three training Airborne Regiments; 301st and 304th Training Airborne Regiments – Ostrov, 302 – Cheryokha, a training artillery regiment (1120th, Ostrov) and other units.

The division's regiments were the heirs of the regiments with the corresponding World War II numbers: 301st and 304th were part of the 100th Guards Airborne Division/Rifle Division, and the 302nd had been part of the 98th Guards Airborne Division/Rifle Division. However, for unclear reasons, the division was soon renamed the 44th. Also the regiment numbering changed: instead of, respectively, the 302nd and 304th, the 226th and 285th regiments appeared (no longer associated historically with the VDV).

While it was not clear whether the division was formed as a Guards formation, when it became the 44th, it was not just not a Guards formation, but the only non-Guards formation in the Soviet Airborne Forces. The regiments were not Guards units either.

In September 1961, available stocks, weapons, military equipment, and the bulk of the division were moved to the Lithuanian SSR. The Divisional Headquarters and the 301st Regiment were established at Gaižiūnai, the 304th Regiment at Rukla (8 km south-east of Jonava), and the 1120th Training Artillery Regiment in the city of Prienai (28 km south of Kaunas).

On 15 May 1972, the 332nd School for Praporshchiks was formed in Gaižiūnai from the 226th Training Airborne Regiment. On 1 December 1987 in accordance with the order of the Ministry of Defence of the Soviet Union of 18 August 1987, the 44th Training Airborne Division was renamed the 242nd Airborne Training Centre.

In 1987 Nikolai Staskov was made the commander of the 44th Training Airborne Division just before it became the 242nd Training Center of the Airborne Forces, with the rank of major general, and he commanded the center until 1991. Staskov reached the general officer ranks in his mid-thirties, becoming a major general at the age of 36 in 1988, reportedly making him the youngest general in the Soviet Armed Forces at the time.

=== Russian Airborne Troops ===
In accordance with the directive of the Defense Ministry on 13 November 1992, the Airborne Training Centre was removed from the Republic of Lithuania to Omsk in Russian territory. Shortly after the relocation, the 301st Training Airborne Regiment was disbanded, and the 1120th Training Artillery Regiment was moved to Ishim in Tyumen Oblast. The training centre headquarters is currently located in the village of Svetloe ('Bright') on the outskirts of Omsk in the Omsk Oblast. In the years since its relocation to Omsk the formerly division-sized formation has shrunk to the size of a brigade.

On 12 July 2015 one of the centre's barracks buildings in the village of Svetloe collapsed. Twenty-three soldiers died and another 19 were injured after a roof and walls of the barracks building collapsed.

Colonel Oleg Ponomarev, who commanded the centre at the time, was arrested. Colonel Arkady Furdeyev replaced him in command of the centre in late August.

== Commanders ==
The following officers have commanded the unit:

- General-mayor Nikolay Grigoryevich Zharenov (1960–1964)
- General-mayor Salikh Khalilovich Khalilov (1964–1974)
- Colonel Yury Aleksandrovich Kuznetsov (1974–1975)
- Colonel Vitaly Semyonovich Lebedev (1975–1977)
- General-mayor Iosif Bakratovich Oganyan (1977–1983)
- General-mayor Valentin Alekseyevich Bogdanchikov (1983–1987)
- General-mayor Nikolai Staskov (1987–1991)
- General-mayor Vitaly Raevsky (1991–1992)
- General-mayor Valery Yevtukhovich (1992–1994)
- General-mayor Sergey Nikolayevich Serikov (1994–1998)
- General-mayor Aleksandr Mikhailovich Pavlyushchenko (1998–2000)
- General-mayor Aleksandr Sergeyevich Iskrenko (2000–2003)
- General-mayor Aleksandr Nikolayevich Kolpachenko (2003–2005) (ru:Колпаченко, Александр Николаевич)
- Colonel Yevgeny Alekseyevich Ustinov (2005–2007)
- Colonel Aleksandr Valeryevich Shushukin (2007–2009)
- Colonel Sergey Stanislavovich Kuvshinov (2009–2011)
- Colonel Igor Grigoryevich Kaply (2011–2013)
- Colonel Oleg Yuryevich Ponomaryov (2013–2015)
- Colonel Arkady Viktorovich Furdeyev (2015–2017)
- Colonel Sergey Aleksandrovich Molochnikov (2017–2019)
- Colonel Vitaly Valeryevich Teryokhin (2019–2021)
- Colonel Vitaly Valeryevich Repin (2021–present)

== Notes ==
- Russian-language source on 242nd Training Centre
