= Dmitri Sukhorukov =

Soviet general (1922–2003)

Dmitri Semyonovich Sukhorukov
- Дмитрий Семёнович Сухоруков
- Born: November 2, 1922; Bely Kolodez village, Korochansky Uyezd, Kursk Governorate, RSFSR
- Died: July 8, 2003 (aged 80); Moscow, Russia
- Military career
- Allegiance: Soviet Union
- Branch: Red Army (Soviet Army from 1946)
- Service years: 1939–1992
- Rank: General of the Army
- Commands: 98th Guards Airborne Division; 2nd Army Corps; 11th Guards Army; Central Group of Forces; Soviet airborne
- Conflicts: World War II; Vienna Offensive; Prague Offensive
- Awards: Order of Lenin; Order "For Merit to the Fatherland", 4th class; Order of Honour; Order of the October Revolution; Order of the Red Banner (2); Order of Kutuzov, 1st class; Order of the Patriotic War, 1st class; Order of the Patriotic War, 2nd class; Order of the Red Star; Order for Service to the Homeland in the Armed Forces of the USSR, 3rd class

Dmitri Semyonovich Sukhorukov (Russian: Дми́трий Семёнович Сухору́ков; 2 November 1922 – 8 July 2003) was a Soviet General of the army who commanded the Soviet airborne between 1979 and 1987, during the Soviet–Afghan War. Sukhorukov fought as company commander in the 104th Guards Rifle Division during World War II and served in the 7th Guards Airborne Division postwar. In September 1962, he became the commander of the 98th Guards Airborne Division. He commanded the 2nd Army Corps from July 1968. After graduating from the Military Academy of the General Staff, Sukhorukov commanded the Central Group of Forces in November 1976. From January 1979 to July 1987, he was the commander of the Soviet airborne, overseeing its operations in Afghanistan. In July 1987, he became the deputy defence minister for personnel and in 1990 was in the Group of Inspectors General. After retiring in 1992, Sukhorokov died on 8 July 2003.

== Early life ==
Sukhorukov was born on 2 November 1922 to a peasant family in Bely Kolodez village in Korochansky Uyezd, Kursk Governorate. In 1939 he entered the Leningrad Military Engineering School, from which he graduated in 1941.

== World War II ==
Sukhorukov was a platoon commander from 1941 to 1943. During 1943 and 1944, he was a company commander of military school cadets. In April 1944, Sukhorukov became a company commander in the 332nd Guards Rifle Regiment of the 104th Guards Rifle Division.

== Postwar ==
Sukhorukov initially was a battalion commander in the airborne and then the deputy commander of the 80th Airborne Regiment. In 1958, Sukhorukov graduated from the Frunze Military Academy, after which he commanded the 108th Guards Airborne Regiment. In 1961, Sukhorukov became the 7th Guards Airborne Division's chief of staff and commanded the 98th Guards Airborne Division from 1962 to 1966. In 1966, Sukhorukov became a corps deputy commander and a corps commander in 1969. He was the deputy commander of the Soviet airborne from 1969. In 1971, he became an army commander. Sukhorukov was the Transcaucasian Military District's deputy commander from 1974 to 1976, after which he led the Central Group of Forces. He replaced Vasily Margelov as commanded of the Soviet airborne in 1979. In 1987, Sukhorukov was replaced by Nikolai Kalinin and became the deputy defense minister for personnel. In 1992, he retired. He published his memoirs in 2000. Sukhroukov died on 8 July 2003 in Moscow.
