= Osvaldas Pikauskas =

Soviet generals (1945–1995)

- Born: 15 July 1945; Duburiai, Lithuanian SSR, Soviet Union
- Died: March 1995; Moscow, Russian Federation
- Military career
- Allegiance: Soviet Union (to 1991); Russia
- Branch: Soviet Airborne Forces; Russian Airborne Forces
- Service years: 1964–1995
- Rank: Colonel-general
- Commands: 98th Guards Airborne Division

Osvaldas Mikolovich Pikauskas (Russian: Освальдас Миколович Пикаускас; 1945–1995) was a Soviet and Russian military leader of Lithuanian origin who served as first deputy commander of the Airborne Troops from January 1991 to March 1995.

== Biography ==
Osvaldas Pikauskas was born in the village of Duburiai in Soviet Lithuania in 1945 and joined the Soviet Army in 1964 as a private. He graduated from an airborne troops officer school in Ryazan in 1969 and went on to study at the Frunze Military Academy in Moscow. He was promoted to major-general at age thirty-eight. He commanded the 98th Guards Airborne Division between 1982 and 1985.

Pikauskas was made deputy commander of the Soviet Airborne Forces (VDV) in January 1991 as a lieutenant-general. He continued his career in the Russian Federation following the dissolution of the Soviet Union in 1991 as a colonel-general of the Russian Airborne Forces.

He died in March 1995.

Military offices
Preceded by Pavel Grachev as First Deputy Commander of the Soviet Airborne Forces	First Deputy Commander of the Russian Airborne Forces; 1991–1995	Succeeded by Alexander Chindarov
