= Incident at Pristina Airport =

1999 confrontation between Russian and NATO forces

Coordinates: 42°34′22″N 21°02′09″E

Incident at Pristina airport
- Part of the aftermath of the Kosovo War
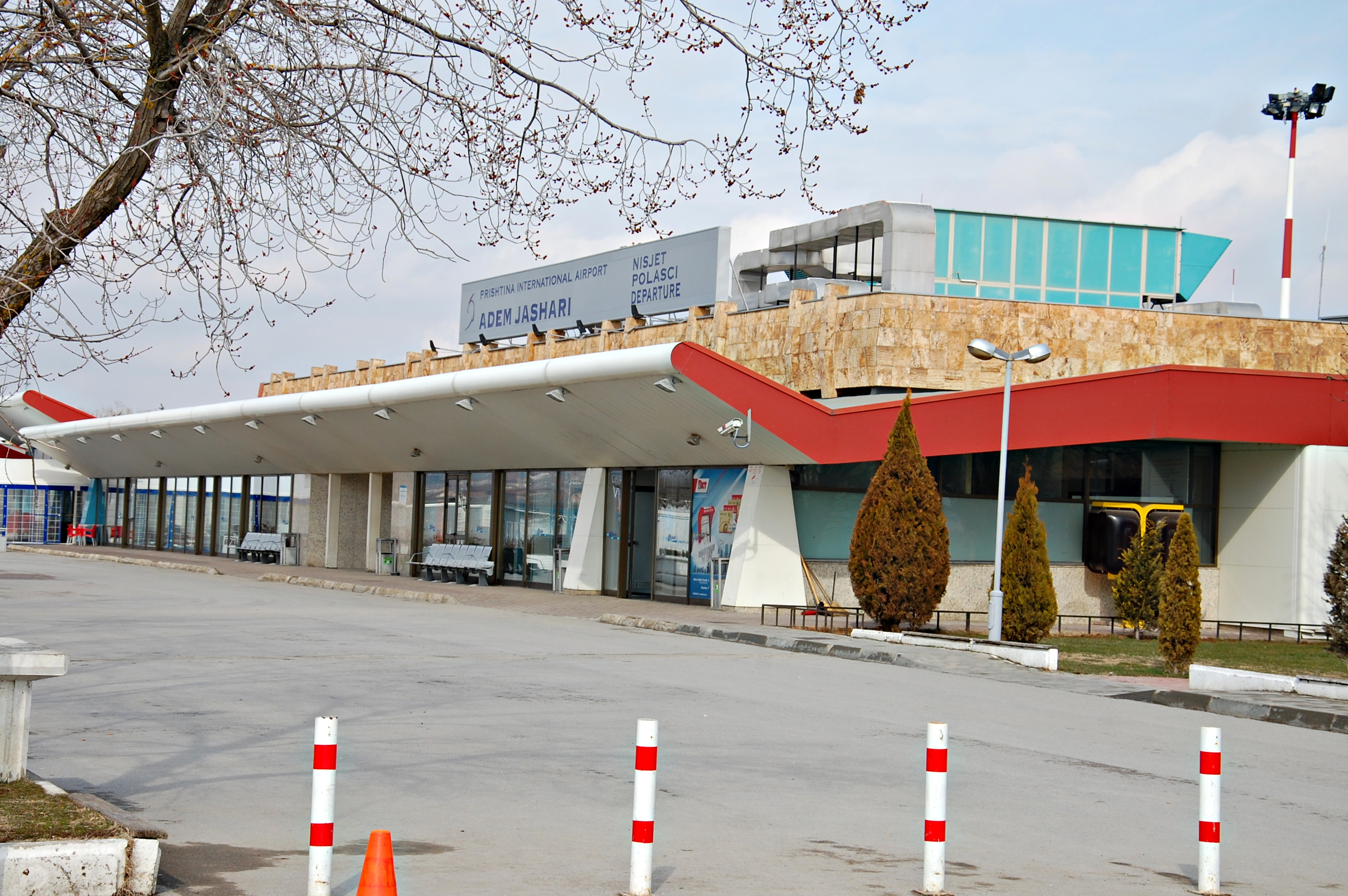
- Pristina International Airport terminal in 2013
Date	12 June 1999
Location	Pristina International Airport, Kosovo, Serbia, Yugoslavia
Result	NATO–Russia agreement: Russian peacekeepers remain in Kosovo

Belligerents
Russia; Passive participation: FR Yugoslavia; AFRY	NATO; United Kingdom; United States; Norway; Passive participation: KLA (UÇK)

Commanders and leaders
Yuri Baluyevsky; Yunus-bek Yevkurov; Nikolai Staskov; Nikolai Ignatov; Viktor Zavarzin	Wesley Clark; Mike Jackson; James Blunt; Hashim Thaçi; Agim Çeku

Strength
206 soldiers and officers Russian Airborne Forces, 15 BTRs, 35 other vehicles	Tank column supported by infantry and combat helicopters, 12,000 approx. in total

Casualties and losses
none	none

The incident at the Pristina airport was a military confrontation between the forces of Russia and NATO from 11 to 13 June 1999, immediately following the end of the Kosovo War. Russian troops unexpectedly occupied the airport ahead of a planned NATO deployment, creating a tense stand-off. NATO Supreme Allied Commander Europe Wesley Clark ordered British brigades under NATO's Kosovo Force commander Mike Jackson to move vehicles to block the runway, and attack Russian forces. British officers refused and delayed Clark's orders. The conflict was resolved through a peaceful agreement, but also due to the potential threat posed by the Kosovo Liberation Army (KLA), which opposed the Russian presence and could have escalated the situation further.

== Background ==
The Kosovo War ended on 11 June 1999, and a joint NATO–Russian peacekeeping force was to be installed in Kosovo. Russia had expected to receive a peacekeeping sector independent of NATO, and was angered when this was refused. There was concern that a separate Russian sector might lead to a partition of Kosovo between a Serb-controlled north and Albanian south. About two months after the start of the Kosovo War, in early May 1999, the Chief of the Main Operations Directorate of the Russian General Staff Colonel General Yuri Baluyevsky ordered the Airborne Forces to begin secret preparations for a possible deployment into Kosovo. These plans were coordinated with the commanders of the Russian peacekeeping force in Bosnia and Herzegovina.

The Allied Rapid Reaction Corps (ARRC) deployed to Skopje in the then-Macedonia during early March 1999. The purpose was to provide unified NATO command for several national contingents including a United States battalion which had been in North Macedonia for some years, together with newly arrived British, German, French and Italian battalions. The force was known as Kosovo Force (KFOR). The commander of KFOR was British Lieutenant General Mike Jackson, with three star rank. His superior officer was US Admiral James O. Ellis, Commander in Chief, Allied Forces Southern Europe, based in Naples. Ellis reported to Wesley Clark, the Supreme Allied Commander Europe, although in practice Clark often bypassed Ellis to communicate directly with Jackson.

== Incident ==
Early on 11 June 1999, a column of about 30 Russian armoured vehicles carrying 250 Russian troops, who were part of the international peacekeeping force in Bosnia, moved into Serbia. At 10:30 this was confirmed by Supreme Headquarters Allied Powers Europe and by pictures from CNN which showed that the Russians had hastily painted "KFOR" in white letters on their vehicles where they had previously been "SFOR". It was assumed that the column was heading for Pristina and Pristina International Airport ahead of the arrival of NATO troops.

Upon hearing of the deployment, American NATO Supreme Allied Commander Europe General Wesley Clark called NATO Secretary-General Javier Solana and was told "you have transfer of authority" in the area. Clark then provisionally ordered a contingent of British and French paratroopers to be flown in by helicopter to seize the airport by force. Staff officers had grave concerns that helicopters might be fired on by Serb forces and that entering Kosovo before the agreed time might cause the Serbs to pull out of the agreement. If the airborne force got into trouble it would have been very difficult to reach them overland through the mountainous country where bridges and tunnels were known to be prepared for demolition. As this operation would have been outside the newly signed agreement for NATO forces to move into Kosovo the following day, national governments had the right to withdraw their own forces and the French government pulled its battalion out. British paratroopers sat by Boeing CH-47 Chinook helicopters in a hot cornfield for most of the afternoon before standing down to prepare for the following day's move into Kosovo.

At 05:00 on 12 June, the British 5th Airborne Brigade began flying into Kosovo from Skopje to secure the ten mile long Kaçanik Gorge for the 4th Armoured Brigade to pass through to Pristina. From there, the lead reconnaissance troop in the race to Pristina was commanded by British Captain James Blunt. The first NATO troops to enter Pristina on 12 June 1999 were Norwegian Forsvarets Spesialkommando (FSK) troops and soldiers from the British Special Air Service's 22 SAS; however, Russian troops arrived at the airport first. The FSK soldiers were the first to come in to contact with the Russian troops at the airport and to report the developments back to Jackson.

Jackson flew by helicopter to Pristina in the evening to hold a press conference, then went to meet General Viktor Zavarzin, who commanded the small Russian force. Sheltering from heavy rain in the wrecked airport terminal, Jackson shared a flask of whisky with Zavarzin, leading to a warming of relations. That evening Clark was still concerned with the possibility of more Russian troops being flown in through NATO-controlled airspace. Russia had placed several airbases on standby and prepared battalions of paratroopers to depart for Pristina on Ilyushin Il-76 military transport aircraft. Fearing that Russian aircraft were heading for the airport, Clark planned to order helicopters to block the runway, and requested helicopter support from Ellis. Jackson's staff contacted the US brigade and were told that the Americans were using their right to opt out of the operation. Two hours later they called to say that the operation was back on again. However, poor weather conditions rendered this impossible at that time.

The following morning, Sunday 13 June, Clark arrived at Jackson's HQ in Skopje. It was pointed out to Clark that the isolated Russians could not be reinforced by air and that, in light of how vital Russian support had been to get a peace agreement, antagonising them would only be counterproductive. Clark refused to accept this and continued to order that the runway be blocked, claiming to be supported by the NATO Secretary-General. According to Blunt, Clark ordered him to "overpower" and "destroy" the Russians, but Blunt refused to obey the order and questioned what Clark meant. Jackson refused to enforce Clark's orders, reportedly telling him "I'm not going to start the Third World War for you."

When again directly ordered to block the runway, Jackson suggested that British tanks and armoured cars would be more suitable, in the knowledge that this would almost certainly be vetoed by the British government. Clark agreed. Jackson was ready to resign rather than follow Clark's order. The British Ministry of Defence authorised British force commander Richard Dannatt to use 4 Armoured Brigade to isolate the airfield but not to block the runways. Clark's orders were not carried out, and the United States instead requested neighbouring states not to allow Russia to use their airspace to ferry in reinforcements. Russia was forced to call off the reinforcements after Bulgaria, Hungary, and Romania refused requests by Russia to use their airspace.

Negotiations were conducted throughout the stand-off during which Russia insisted that its troops would only be answerable to Russian commanders and that it would retain an exclusive zone for its own peacekeepers. NATO refused these concessions, predicting that it would lead to the partition of Kosovo into an Albanian south and a Serbian north. Both sides eventually agreed that Russian peacekeepers would deploy throughout Kosovo independently of NATO.

== Aftermath ==
After an agreement had been secured, Pristina airport was reactivated by Britain's 53 Field Squadron (Air Support) of the Royal Engineers as a military airbase on 15 October 1999, then international air transport resumed to several European cities. During that period, the Russian KFOR along with NATO forces were in charge of security for the airport. Clark was subsequently removed from his NATO post early by General Hugh Shelton, the US Chairman of the Joint Chiefs of Staff. In the following years, both Jackson and Blunt, the latter of whom started a successful music career after leaving the British Army, have spoken extensively about the incident in lectures and interviews.

== See also ==
- The Balkan Line, a 2019 Russian-Serbian film based on the incident
