= Vladimir Kazantsev (general) =

Russian Airborne Forces general

Major General Vladimir Kazantsev
- Born: 1953
- Died: 17 December 2001 (aged 48); Moscow, Russia
- Military career
- Allegiance: Soviet Union (to 1991); Russia
- Branch: Soviet Airborne Forces; Russian Airborne Forces
- Rank: Major general
- Commands: VDV Group in Chechnya; Russian military contingent in Kosovo
- Conflicts: Soviet-Afghan War; First Chechen War; Second Chechen War

Vladimir Kazantsev (Russian: Владимир Казанцев; 1953 – 17 December 2001) was a Russian Airborne Forces major general who held multiple senior posts. From 1997 to 2000 he was Deputy Commander of the Airborne Forces for Peacekeeping Forces, and from 2000 to 2001 he commanded the Russian military contingent in Kosovo. He was supposed to become Deputy Commander of the Airborne Forces for Combat Training, but shortly after his return to Moscow from Kosovo, he died by falling from his apartment building.

== Biography ==
Vladimir Kazantsev was born in 1953 and served in the Soviet Airborne Forces (VDV). He was a veteran of the Soviet-Afghan War and, after the fall of the Soviet Union, the First Chechen War. He rose to prominence in October 1996, when he was removed from his position in the Russian Airborne Forces by President Boris Yeltsin for openly criticizing the General Staff for its plan to merge the independent service with the Russian Ground Forces. However he was restored to his post within a year. In 1997 he succeeded Nikolai Staskov as Deputy Commander of the Airborne Forces for Peacekeeping Forces.

Kazantsev commanded the VDV Group deployed in the Second Chechen War. In January 2000, during that conflict, he was involved in a helicopter crash in Chechnya and survived.

On 30 October 2000 he was appointed as commander of the Russian military contingent in the Kosovo Force. He arrived at Pristina International Airport to take up his new role in early November. His original post of Deputy Commander for Peacekeeping Forces went to Major General Aleksandr Popov after he went to Kosovo. Kazantsev was commander of the Russian peacekeeper contingent until 25 October 2001, being succeeded on that date by Major General Nikolai Kriventsov of the Russian Ground Forces, when the paratroopers there were replaced out by troops from the Moscow Military District. Kazantsev was to be assigned as the Deputy Commander of the Airborne Forces for Combat Training.

About a month after returning from Kosovo, on 17 December 2001, Kazantsev died after falling from the eighth floor of his Moscow apartment building, at the age of 48. The Moscow garrison military prosecutor's office opened an investigation into his death. Two theories about his death emerged, one that it was an accidental death and another that it was murder. According to investigators, Kazantsev died because his wife locked the apartment door when she left for work, and there was another key hidden somewhere in the apartment. He was unable to find it and tried to leave the apartment by climbing from his balcony to one of his neighbor's, but fell in the process.

Military offices
| Preceded by Nikolai Staskov | Deputy Commander of the Russian Airborne Forces for Peacekeeping Forces; 1997–2000 | Succeeded by Aleksandr Popov |
| Preceded by Valery Yevtukhovich | Commander of the Russian military contingent in Kosovo; 2000–2001 | Succeeded by Nikolai Kriventsov |
