= Order "For Personal Courage" =

Courage award of the Soviet Union and Russia

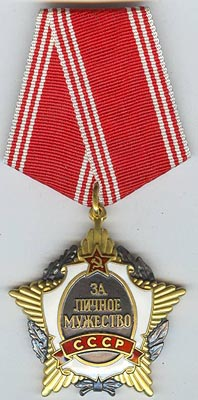
- Badge of the Order "For Personal Courage"
- Type: Single-grade order
- Awarded for: showing outstanding courage and bravery during life-saving, keeping of public order and safeguard of State property
- Presented by: the Soviet Union; Russia
- Eligibility: Soviet citizens
- Status: No longer awarded
- Established: December 28, 1988
- First award: February 3, 1989
- Final award: 1994

Highlights
- Total: 529
- Ribbon of the Order "For Personal Courage"

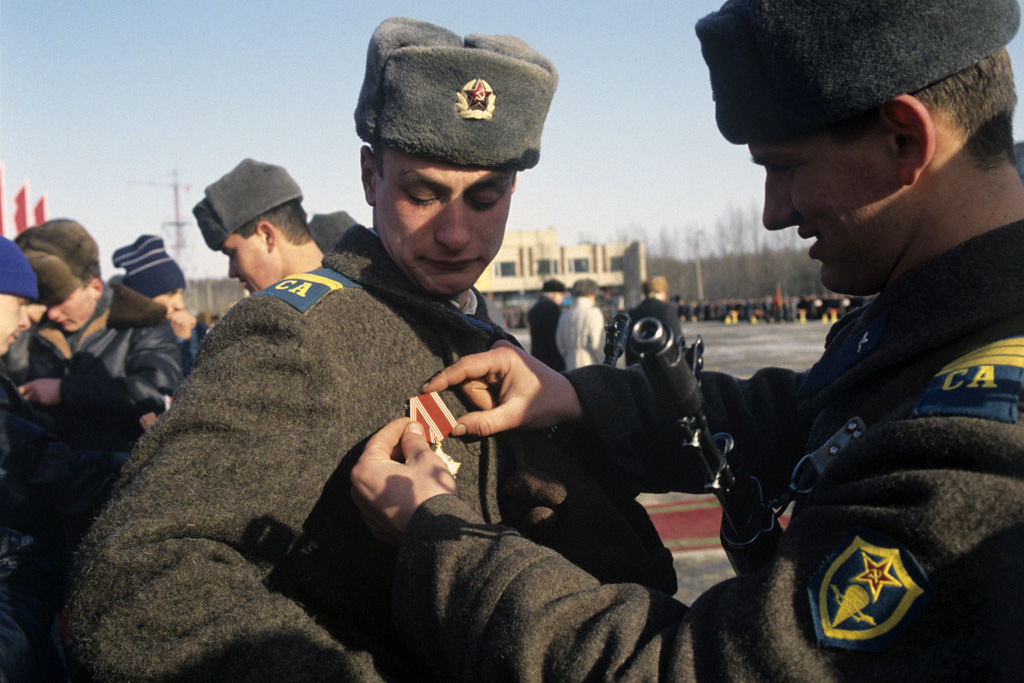
Junior Sergeant B. Mazurov, left, of the Tula Guards 106th Airborne Division, who distinguished himself in Afghanistan, being awarded the Order for Personal Courage

The Order "For Personal Courage" was established by Presidium of the Supreme Soviet of the USSR on December 28, 1988. This decoration could be awarded to any USSR citizen showing outstanding courage and bravery during life-saving, keeping of public order and safeguard of state property, as well as for fighting crime, environmental catastrophes, and other exceptional events.

The award was designed by Alexander Zhuk and represents a silver gilded silver star with the words "For Personal Courage" and "USSR" written on it.

The order was first awarded on February 3, 1989, to a teacher of school No. 42 in the city of Ordzhonikidze (now Vladikavkaz) Natalia Vladimirovna Efimova. Her class was taken hostage and later freed in a police operation. The order was awarded 529 times in total. Many more medals were made, but remained unissued. It was replaced in Russia by the Order of Courage in 1994, which has a different design.

== See also ==
- Category:Recipients of the Order "For Personal Courage"
