= Leonty Shevtsov =

Russian colonel general

Colonel General Leonty Shevtsov
- Леонтий Шевцов
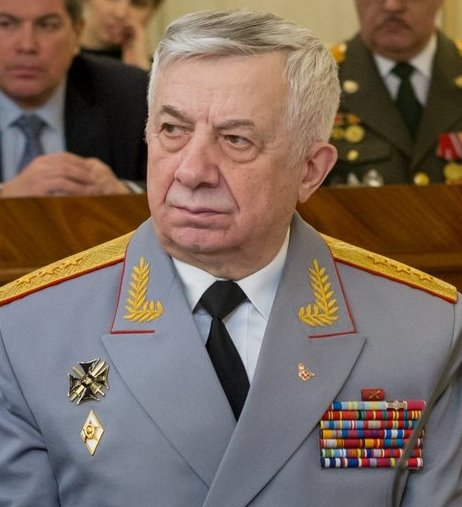
- Shevtsov in 2019

Deputy Minister of Internal Affairs
- In office 24 July 1997 – 6 April 1999

Personal details
- Born: March 14, 1946 (age 80) North Kazakhstan Region, Kazakh SSR, Soviet Union

Military service
- Allegiance: Soviet Union; Russia
- Branch/service: Soviet Army; Russian Ground Forces; Internal Troops of Russia
- Years of service: 1964–2007
- Rank: Colonel general
- Commands: Internal Troops; 1st Guards Tank Army
- Battles/wars: First Chechen War

Leonty Pavlovich Shevtsov (Russian: Леонтий Павлович Шевцов; born 14 March 1946) is a retired Russian colonel general. He served in a number of senior positions, including as the Commander-in-Chief of the Internal Troops of Russia from 1997 to 1998 and as a Deputy Minister of Internal Affairs from 1997 to 1999.

After becoming an officer in the Soviet Army he commanded units at every level from a platoon to a field army. During the early 1990s, he was the commander of the 1st Guards Tank Army, the deputy chief of the Main Operational Directorate at the Russian General Staff, and the chief of staff of the Joint Group of Forces in Chechnya. Shevtsov was sent to the NATO military headquarters from 1995 to 1997, when Russia deployed one brigade for the peacekeeping mission in Bosnia and Herzegovina, and worked out the framework for Russia's participation with the Supreme Allied Commander Europe, a U.S. general. He became the deputy to the supreme commander for Russian forces. Shevtsov was later the head of the Internal Troops of the Ministry of Internal Affairs in the late 1990s after returning to Russia and oversaw their reforms.

== Early life and education ==
Leonty Shevtsov was born on 14 March 1946 in the village of Stepnoye, Timiryazev District, in the North Kazakhstan Region of the Kazakh Soviet Socialist Republic.

Shevtsov joined the Soviet Army in 1964. His military education includes graduating from the Tashkent Higher Combined Arms Command School in 1968, the Frunze Military Academy in 1977, and the General Staff Academy in 1990.

== Military career ==
Shevtsov's career was in the motorized rifle forces. Shevtsov was first stationed with the Western Group of Forces in Germany before being sent to serve in Siberia. After attending the Frunze Military Academy in the mid-1970s he spent his service in the Soviet Far East until 1988. During those years he commanded units from the platoon to the division level, was also a regiment and division chief of staff. Despite the fact that Soviet Army was being reduced around this time, Shevtsov continued to advance. He graduated from the Frunze Military Academy as a captain, and received two early promotions, to lieutenant colonel in 1980 and to colonel in 1985. He commanded two divisions, one from 1985 to 1987 and then another from 1987 to 1988. During that second command, he was promoted to major general.

Shevtsov then attended the General Staff Academy and after graduating he was sent to the Western Group of Forces in Germany. There, Shevtsov was the chief of staff of a guards army from 1990 to 1991, before becoming commander of the 1st Guards Tank Army from 1992 to 1993, during which time he oversaw its relocation from Germany to Smolensk, Russia.

In March 1993 Shevtsov became the Deputy Chief of the Main Operations Directorate, General Staff of the Armed Forces of the Russian Federation. When Lieutenant General Anatoly Kvashnin was appointed to lead the Joint Group of Federal Forces in Chechnya in December 1994, he chose to have Shevtsov as his chief of staff. Shevtsov and the General Staff only had a couple of weeks to plan for the operation. During the early phase of the First Chechen War he was responsible for planning and implementing the military operations there and took part in the battles of Grozny, Argun, Gudermes, and Shali.

Shevtsov remained in the role of chief of staff in Chechnya "during some of the bloodiest days of that civil war," from December 1994 to April 1995, and in June 1995 he was also succeeded as the Deputy Chief of the Main Operations Directorate by Lieutenant General Yuri Baluyevsky. He was then appointed the First Deputy Chief of the same directorate, holding that post until July 1997.

=== NATO ===
In late 1995, when the Dayton Agreement was negotiated to end the Bosnian War, the U.S. wanted Russia to participate in the deployment of a peacekeeping force to separate the warring factions and ensure the implementation of the agreement. Three months of negotiations took place to determine the political framework under which Russian troops would be operating, which involved talks between U.S. Defense Secretary William J. Perry and Russian Defense Minister Pavel Grachev. The Russian government did not want their participation to be under NATO command, and wanted the Russian peacekeeping contingent to only take orders from an American general, but the Americans were acting in their capacity as members of NATO. The negotiations at the ministerial level were focused on preserving the command structure while still having the Russian military forces take part in the mission.

At the ministerial level, a decision was made to send Russian General Staff officers to NATO on 8 October 1995, and Colonel General Shevtsov was chosen to lead the Russian Ministry of Defense Operational Group to be sent there. The exact solution for the framework of the mission was worked out by him and U.S. Army General George Joulwan, the NATO Supreme Allied Commander Europe (SACEUR). In three weeks they successfully arranged the joint Russian-NATO mission, despite the fact that previously their military-to-military ties were in an early stage of development, and it had been mostly limited to high-level meetings with no practical work at the lower levels.

Shevtsov and a delegation of five Russian officers arrived at the Supreme Headquarters Allied Powers Europe (SHAPE) in Mons, Belgium, on 15 October 1995. As part of their arrangement to integrate the Russian force into the NATO mission command structure, a new position was created at SHAPE called the Deputy to the Supreme Allied Commander Europe for Russian Forces. They identified the tasks and area of responsibility for the Russian peacekeepers and established the framework for it at the operational and strategic level. That included a permanent group of officers to represent the Russian General Staff at SHAPE and maintain contact between them, led by the Deputy for Russian Forces. Shevtsov was the first Deputy and the head of the Russian Ministry of Defense Operational Group at SHAPE.

The Russian 1st Separate Airborne Brigade that was deployed to Bosnia on 12 January 1996 was under the tactical command of Multi-National Division North, led by U.S. Major General William Nash, while being under the operational control of Supreme Allied Commander Europe through Shevtsov, the Deputy for Russian Forces. It was the first deployment of Russian military forces under NATO command. The 1st Separate Airborne brigade consisted of two or three battalions, drawn from the Russian 76th Guards Air Assault and 98th Guards Airborne divisions.

There were regular meetings between Shevtsov, Joulwan, and their staffs at SHAPE during the mission. Russia continued its participation in the mission when in late 1996 the Implementation Force in Bosnia became the Stabilization Force. According to Joulwan, the cooperation between NATO and Russia at SHAPE and in Bosnia contributed to the development and signing of the NATO–Russia Founding Act at the 1997 Paris summit. Shevtsov was awarded the Legion of Merit by the U.S. for his work at SHAPE. Speaking about the NATO-Russian military-to-military cooperation, he said "We military have set an example for our politicians by demonstrating that the question of Russian participation in a peacekeeping operation in Bosnia-Herzegovina jointly with the Americans ... can be successfully solved."

=== Interior Ministry ===
After a year and a half at the NATO military headquarters, he returned to Russia and was appointed the Commander of the Internal Troops in July 1997. The appointment of Shevtsov, an army general with no experience in the Interior Ministry, was interpreted as helping bring the Internal Troops under the control of the Defense Ministry and of his ally, General Anatoly Kvashnin, who was then the Chief of the General Staff. It was also to begin reform in the Internal Troops, which had up to that point been unaffected by the reforms taking place in the Armed Forces. The reforms that Shevtsov implemented at the Internal Troops included creating high-readiness units, raising the professionalism of officers, and improving combat training and material conditions. He was succeeded in that role by Pavel Maslov in May 1998.

After commanding the Internal Troops, from May 1998 to April 1999 he led the Main Directorate of the Interior Ministry in the North Caucasus. Shevtsov was also a Deputy Minister of Internal Affairs during his entire time at the Interior Ministry from 1997 to 1999. After that, until his retirement in 2007, he was the inspector of the main command of the Internal Troops. When the National Guard of Russia was created from the Internal Troops, he became an advisor to its commander, General Viktor Zolotov.

== Awards ==
Domestic

- Order "For Merit to the Fatherland", 4th class
- Order of Military Merit
- Order "For Service to the Homeland in the Armed Forces of the USSR", 2nd and 3rd classes
- Merited Military Specialist of the Russian Federation

Foreign

- United States: Legion of Merit

== Promotions ==
Rank	Date
Lieutenant colonel	December 1980
Colonel	21 February 1985
Major general	29 October 1987
Lieutenant general	7 July 1992
Colonel general	9 February 1995

== Citations ==
Military offices
Preceded by Gennady Kolyshkin	Commander of the 1st Guards Tank Army; 1992–1993	Succeeded by Vasily Sosedov
Preceded by Anatoly Kvashnin	Deputy Chief of the Main Operations Directorate of the General Staff; 1993–1995	Succeeded by Yuri Baluyevsky
Preceded by Anatoly Kvashnin	First Deputy Chief of the Main Operations Directorate of the General Staff; 1995–1997	Succeeded by Aleksandr Rukshin
Position created	Deputy to the Supreme Allied Commander Europe for Russian Forces; 1995–1997	Succeeded by Anatoly Krivolapov
Preceded by Anatoly Shkirko	Commander-in-Chief of the Internal Troops of Russia; 1997–1998	Succeeded by Pavel Maslov
