= 1st Separate Airborne Brigade =

Russian unit in Bosnia peace mission

- 1-я отдельная воздушно-десантная бригада
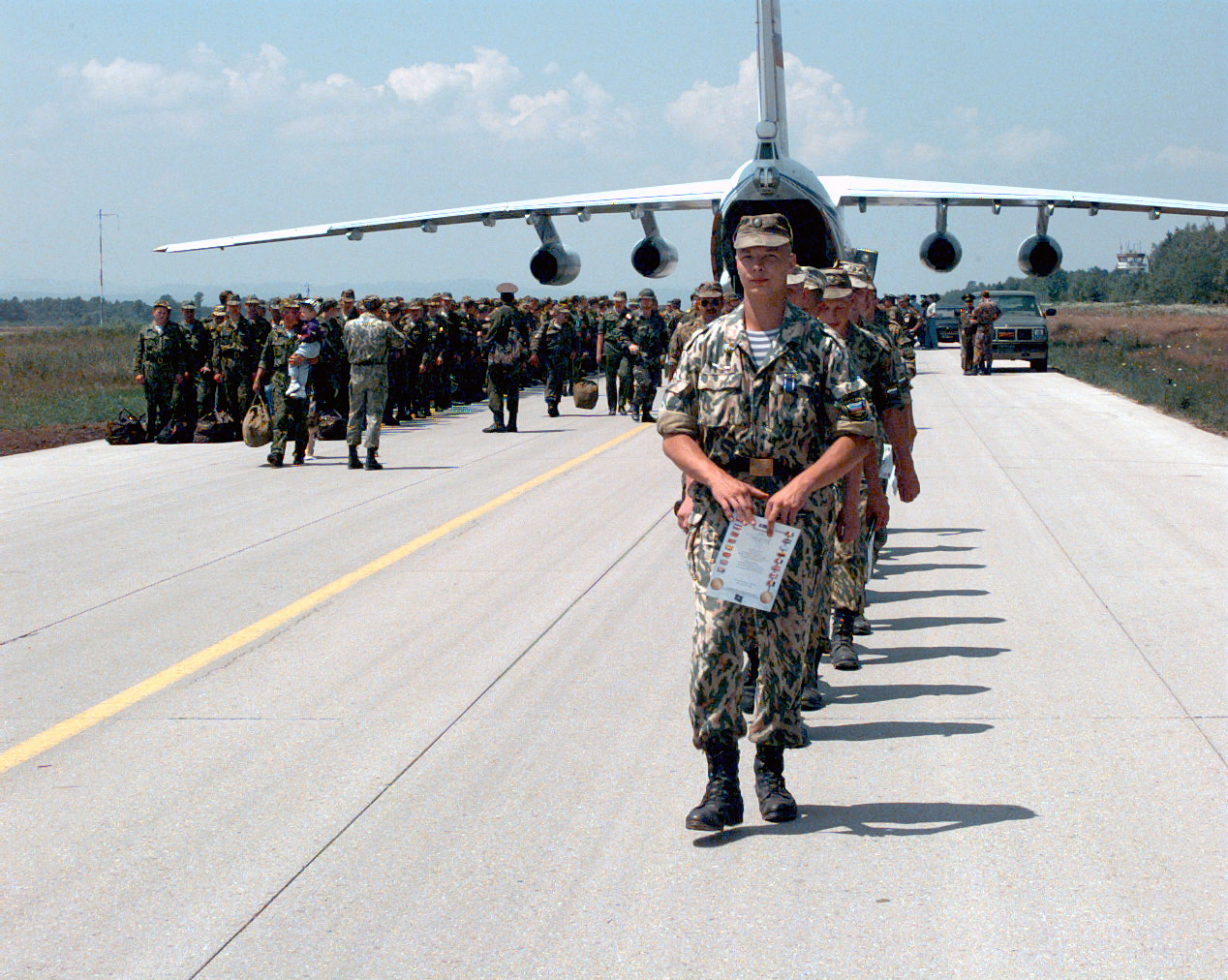
- Paratroopers of the 1st Separate Airborne Brigade boarding an Ilyushin Il-76 transport in Bosnia
- Active: 1996–2003
- Country: Russia
- Branch: Russian Airborne Forces
- Type: Airborne
- Role: Peacekeeping
- Size: 1,300–1,500 (1996); 900 (2001); 350 (2003)
- Part of: Implementation Force (IFOR); Stabilization Force (SFOR)
- Garrison/HQ: Ugljevik, Republika Srpska, Bosnia and Herzegovina
- Engagements: Operations Joint Endeavor, Joint Guard, and Joint Forge

Commanders
- Notable commanders: Alexander Lentsov; Nikolai Ignatov

The 1st Separate Airborne Brigade (Russian: 1-я отдельная воздушно-десантная бригада, 1ОВДБр), also referred to in English as the 1st Russian Separate Airborne Brigade (1 RSAB), was a Russian Airborne Forces unit that existed from 1996 to 2003 and was Russia's contribution to the NATO-led peacekeeping mission in Bosnia and Herzegovina, the Implementation Force (IFOR), later renamed the Stabilization Force (SFOR).

The brigade was put together in the fall of 1995 from elements of the 76th and 98th Guards Airborne Divisions, and it arrived at the Tuzla Air Base in Bosnia and Herzegovina in January 1996, just after being officially activated. Its efforts were directed at separating the warring factions from each other, clearing mines, and creating safe conditions for the civilian population and international humanitarian organizations. The Russian brigade was the largest force from any non-NATO country involved in the peacekeeping mission.

The participation of the brigade in the peacekeeping mission in Bosnia and Herzegovina was the first time Russian troops took part in a NATO-led operation. They operated under a unique system of command, being led on the ground by the U.S. 1st Armored Division commander, as they were in the American area of responsibility, and were under the operational direction of the NATO supreme commander in Europe through his deputy for Russian forces, a Russian general. This way the brigade was subordinated to the NATO supreme commander while still being under Russian national authority.

The mission was considered to be a success by both sides, with the Russian brigade having contributed to the achievement of its military objectives, and according to U.S. General George Joulwan the development of the Russian–NATO relationship in that process created the basis for the signing of the NATO-Russia Founding Act in May 1997. The only serious disruption to the command structure occurred during the Kosovo War in 1999, but relations between NATO and the Russian military were restored after that, and elements of the 1st Airborne Brigade remained in Bosnia until 2003, though it was significantly downsized starting after 1999.

== History ==
=== Background ===
After negotiations began in Dayton, Ohio, in the fall of 1995 between the leaders of the factions involved in the Bosnian War, the United States wanted Russia to take part in ensuring that the resulting Dayton Agreement was followed by all sides, with Russian troops to serve in a NATO peacekeeping mission, the Implementation Force (IFOR). There were tensions between NATO and Russia after the alliance's airstrikes against the Bosnian Serb forces earlier that year, but Russian president Boris Yeltsin agreed that Russia should participate, and negotiations between Russian defense minister Pavel Grachev and U.S. defense secretary William J. Perry decided on how this would happen. On 8 November 1995 they determined that a Russian brigade of two or three infantry battalions would be deployed as part of the peacekeeping force. However, there was continued disagreement about the exact command structure for the mission, because the Russian government was reluctant to have its troops under the command of NATO. The Russians initially considered their troops to be under U.S. command, not NATO, but they were going to take part in a NATO mission and the American general in charge of it was acting in his capacity as the NATO supreme commander.

The exact framework for the mission was worked out between NATO Supreme Allied Commander Europe (SACEUR), U.S. General George Joulwan, and a Russian General Staff delegation led by Colonel General Leonty Shevtsov. They determined that the NATO supreme commander would have operational control over the brigade through Shevtsov, who was given a new position at Supreme Headquarters Allied Powers Europe (SHAPE) as the SACEUR's deputy for Russian Forces. On the ground in Bosnia, the brigade would be working with the U.S. Army's 1st Armored Division, and its commander Major General William L. Nash would have tactical control over the Russian unit. Both the U.S. and Russian forces were part of the Multi-National Division North.

=== Formation and deployment ===
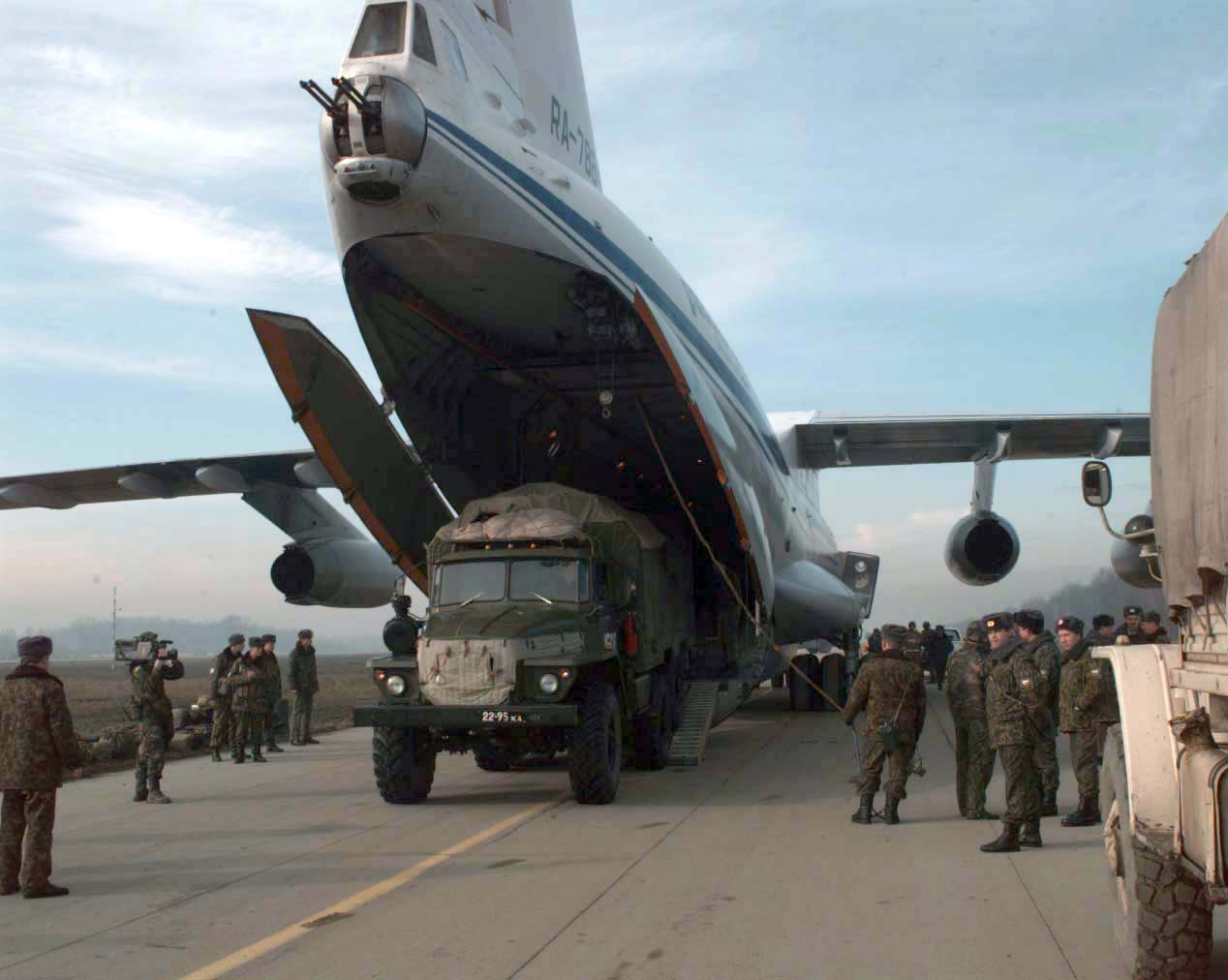
Arrival of Russian troops at Tuzla Air Base, January 1996

In November and December 1995 the 1st Separate Airborne Brigade was put together from elements of the 76th and 98th Guards Airborne Divisions of the Russian Airborne Forces (VDV), and was officially activated on 5 January 1996. At the start it had about 1,340 paratroopers, though other sources give it a strength of 1,500 or 1,600 men, along with 116 vehicles and eight artillery pieces. Its equipment included BMD-1, BMD-2, BTR-D, and BTR-80 armored vehicles, 2S9 self-propelled mortar, and Ural trucks. The troops of the brigade received higher pay than regular soldiers and had been given specific training. One source estimated that 40 percent of them were combat veterans, having seen action in the Soviet-Afghan and/or the First Chechen War.

Starting on 12 January 1996, the first elements of the brigade arrived at Tuzla Air Base in northeast Bosnia and Herzegovina, the American area of responsibility. The brigade was commanded by Colonel Alexander Lentsov. They began their work in early February, which involved patrolling their area and manning 12 checkpoints. Their sector was located in the Posavina corridor, near the Serbia–Bosnia and Herzegovina border, and included a 75-kilometer section of the internal boundary between the Bosnian Serb Republic and the Federation of Bosnia and Herzegovina. The brigade was organized into the 1st and 2nd Airborne Battalions, each of them being responsible for a certain part of the boundary. They were tasked with making sure that the warring sides stayed away from each other.

Up to this point, Russia had deployed two infantry battalions to serve under the United Nations Protection Force in Yugoslavia from 1992 to 1995, and the basis for Russia's participation in peacekeeping missions was established by Russian President Boris Yeltsin's decree from 23 June 1995 "On the procedure for the provision of military and civilian personnel for participation in activities for the support or restoration of international peace and security." But the 1st Separate Airborne Brigade in Bosnia represented the first time that Russian military forces took part in a NATO-led mission, under NATO operational command.

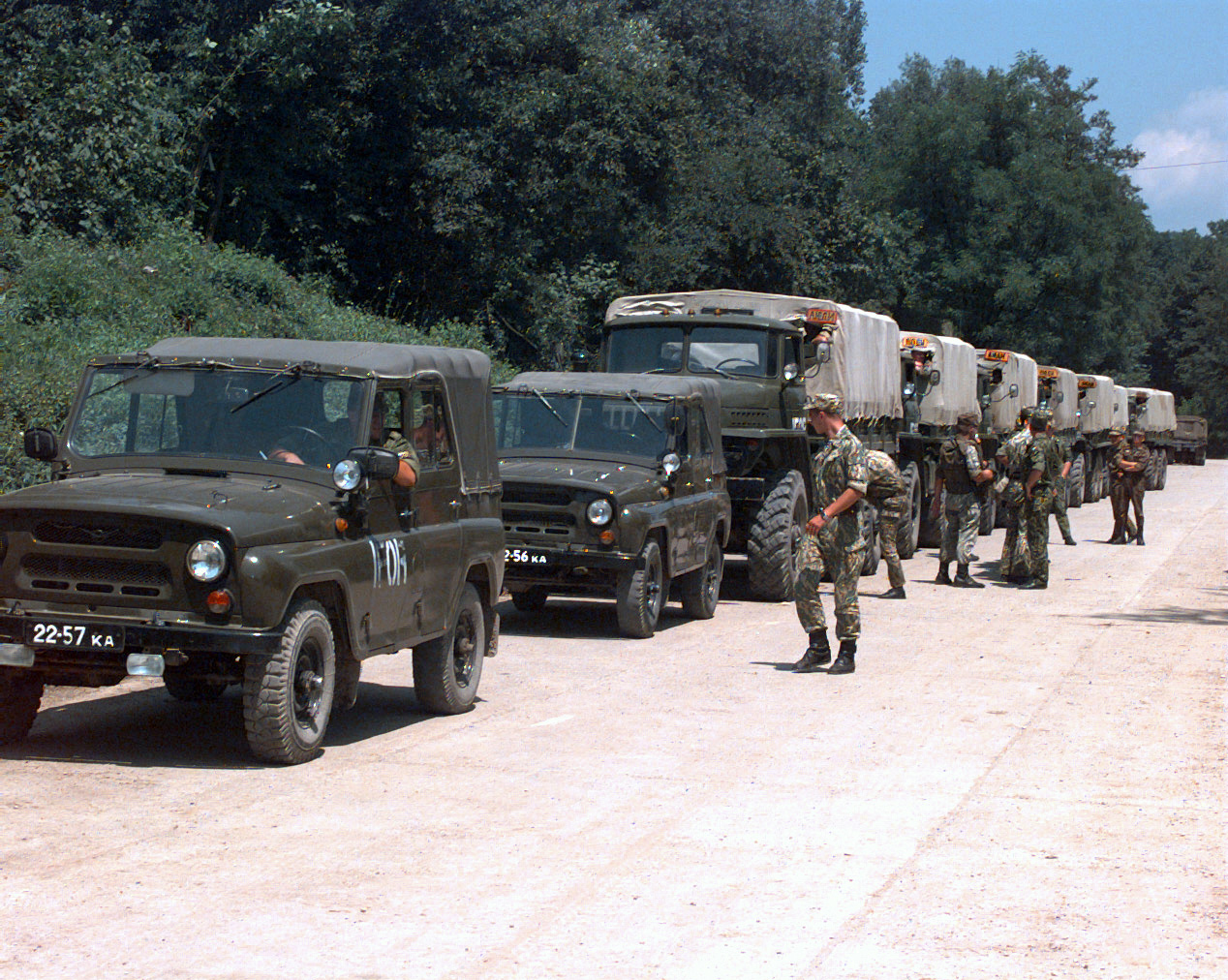
Brigade vehicles, July 1996

The Russian and American soldiers got along well overall, despite cultural and organizational differences. Some American liaison personnel were assigned to the area of the Russian unit, along with a United States Army Special Forces team. The Russian brigade also included soldiers from the 45th Special Reconnaissance Regiment, the special forces unit of the VDV. The sector of the Russian brigade was located between two brigades of the U.S. 1st Armored Division. Joint patrols between Russian and NATO soldiers happened regularly, and starting in 1997 there were joint training exercises held by the U.S. and Russian troops in Bosnia. Their other tasks included mine clearing, assisting the UN, and providing a safe environment for civilians and the activities of international humanitarian aid organizations as well as the local government. The Russian brigade made a "valuable contribution" to the success of these military objectives early on.

The commanders of the brigade and the American division were able to work effectively with each other, and an effort was made by both the Russian and American officers to develop a positive professional relationship. The brigade commander had the ability under the system that was set up to check with the Russian general at SHAPE about the orders he received from the American division commander, but in practice it was rare that there was any disagreement. Russia continued its participation when in late 1996 the Implementation Force became the Stabilization Force (SFOR), and its contribution of troops to the mission became the largest of any non-NATO country. IFOR activities were called Operation Joint Endeavor by NATO, and SFOR carried out Operations Joint Guard and Joint Forge.

However, there were some disagreements. The Russian brigade chose to put its headquarters in Ugljevik, a town in the Bosnian Serb Republic, instead of in Tuzla, where the American division was based. In late December 1995, a Russian general, Nikolai Staskov, arrived in Bosnia and met with the indicted Bosnian Serb war criminal Ratko Mladic without the approval of NATO. Staskov was the Russian Airborne Forces deputy commander for peacekeeping operations, and NATO officers saw him as a "hardliner" who reportedly disapproved of Russian and American soldiers fraternizing. Other instances included U.S. forces taking control of Serbian TV transmitters in October 1997 and arresting a Bosnian Serb corps commander in December 1998, with the Russian troops not wanting to participate in either situation even though it was in their sector. There was also some tension between Bosnian Muslim troops and the Russian brigade's 2nd battalion, which was deployed to the Muslim town of Simin Han.

=== Kosovo incident ===
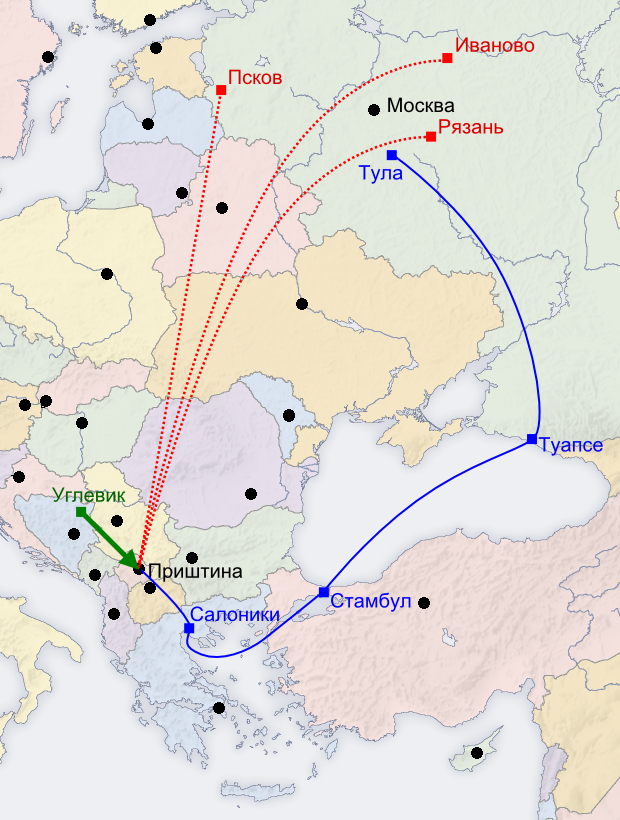
Planned and actual Russian deployments into Kosovo in June 1999

Starting on 24 March 1999, NATO began airstrikes against Serbia in what became the Kosovo War. In response to this the Yeltsin administration cancelled the command arrangement for the Russian contingent in SFOR and withdrew the deputy for Russian Forces and his staff from the NATO military headquarters. The 1st Separate Airborne Brigade remained in Bosnia but the chain of command was not defined. Russia, which historically had close relations with Serbia, was put into a difficult position, and the Russian leadership believed that it was going to be left out of the peacekeeping mission in Kosovo that NATO wanted the Serbian government to accept. Although Russia approved a NATO-led peace mission to deploy to Kosovo at the UN Security Council, the question of its own involvement was still unanswered by the Western countries. The Europeans wanted the Russians to participate, but the U.S. believed that NATO should wait before involving Russia.

A senior General Staff official, Colonel General Yuri Baluyevsky, ordered the VDV in May 1999 to secretly prepare its forces in Bosnia for a possible deployment into Kosovo. From early June 1999 the brigade was kept at a high level of readiness, and experienced personnel were selected by the Russian command staff for the mission, which was to seize a strategically important location, the Pristina Airport, before NATO forces could get to it. The airport could then be used to fly in additional air assault units from Russia. On 10 June the Russian brigade began a training exercise that served as a cover for their final preparations, and on the next day it received the order from Moscow to enter Kosovo ahead of the NATO force. President Yeltsin was informed about the military's plan at the last moment and approved it. On the same day a group of 206 paratroopers, driving in 15 BTR armored vehicles and 35 Ural trucks or cars, led by former Russian military representative to NATO Viktor Zavarzin, departed Bosnia and crossed the border into Serbia on their way to Kosovo. They painted over the SFOR markings on their vehicles with "KFOR" (meaning NATO's Kosovo Force). On their way the convoy passed many Serbian Army troops that were withdrawing from Kosovo and were positively greeted by Serbian civilians.

Another group of 18 Spetsnaz GRU operators led by Yunus-bek Yevkurov arrived at the airport earlier to hold it until the main convoy arrived. The original plan to fly in reinforcements was cancelled because neighboring countries were not willing to open their airspace to Russian military transports. They got to Kosovo much later by ship, taking them to Greece, leaving the Russian force at the airport without backup. The main convoy arrived at the airport on 12 June 1999. U.S. General Wesley Clark, who learned about what the Russians were doing and did not want them to take over the majority-Serb sector in northern Kosovo, sent about 250 British troops to the airport by helicopter, but the Russian BTRs blocked them from landing. They also sent ground troops, leading to a tense stand-off between NATO and Russian soldiers. When the British commander, Lieutenant General Mike Jackson, was ordered by Clark to take control of the runway, he famously told him "I'm not starting World War III for you." It was a success for Russia, which used the presence of the group at the airport to get to participate in the Kosovo Force. The Kosovo Albanian leader Hashim Thaçi accepted this because they would be under NATO command. The first group of reinforcements, 100 paratroopers, arrived in late June, followed by more troops in July. Major General Valery Yevtukhovich, the former head of the VDV operational group in Bosnia, was appointed as the first commander of the Russian military contingent in Kosovo Force. The original troops from the 1st Airborne Brigade were eventually replaced by other forces from Russia, and the Russian contribution to KFOR eventually numbered 3,600 men.

=== End of the mission ===
The disruption caused by the Kosovo War did not end the Russian participation in SFOR. During the next year, the deputy for Russian Forces returned to the NATO headquarters and the brigade was still subordinated to the Multi-National Division North. A sign of the level of interoperability that the Russian and NATO forces in Bosnia had achieved was the fact they continued to operate together even after the Kosovo situation. On 26 February 2002, members of the 1st Airborne Brigade and American soldiers from the Combined Joint Special Operations Task Force carried out a para-drop exercise together, which included Russian soldiers parachuting out of Sikorsky UH-60 Black Hawk helicopters. The exercise ended with Russians and Americans awarding their countries' paratrooper wings to each other.

Russia did begin reducing the number of troops involved in SFOR. In 2001, the Russian brigade was down to 900 personnel, with plans to reduce it further. By 2002 the brigade consisted of just one regiment, the 22nd Separate Parachute Regiment, and starting that year the Airborne Forces began to be replaced in their role by motorized infantry from the Russian Ground Forces. As of 2003 the total number of Russian troops in Bosnia had been reduced to 350. In 2003 the Russian government decided to withdraw all of its peacekeeping forces in the former Yugoslavia because of financial issues and logistical difficulties. The withdrawal of the Russian military contingent from Bosnia, then commanded by Airborne Forces Colonel Sergei Shakurin, began on 22 May 2003 and was completed on 14 June 2003. The 1st Separate Airborne Brigade was no longer active after 2003.

Overall, the Russian participation in the NATO mission was considered a success by both sides. According to the U.S. division commander, Russian soldiers carried out their role with proficiency. There were virtually no complaints from the local population where the Russian forces were stationed. Despite some disagreements between them and the events of the Kosovo crisis, the close military relationship between the Russian and NATO troops in Bosnia held up during the years of Russia's participation in IFOR/SFOR. The NATO supreme commander, General George Joulwan, said that "I firmly believe that our cooperation at SHAPE and in Bosnia was instrumental in the creation of the NATO-Russia Founding Act, which was signed in May 1997 in Paris. As NATO's Deputy Secretary General said, 'Political reality is finally catching up with the progress you at SHAPE had already made.'" In 2003, one of his successors, General James L. Jones, said at the conclusion of the Russian participation in SFOR and KFOR that "History will show that NATO-Russia military cooperation ended civil war in the Balkans, and sparked the development of a new, broader, special partnership in Europe."

== Structure ==
From 1996:

- Brigade troops (HQ Ugljevik)
  - Reconnaissance team
  - Signal company
  - Combat engineer company
  - NBC defence platoon
  - Support units headquarters company
  - Repair company
  - Motor transport company
  - Logistical support company
  - Military police platoon
- 1st Airborne Battalion (HQ Priboj)
- 2nd Airborne Battalion (HQ Simin Han)

By 2002:

- 22nd Separate Parachute Regiment

== Known commanders ==
- Colonel Alexander Lentsov (1996)
- Colonel Sergei Generalov (1996)
- Colonel Alexander Iskrenko (1998)
- Colonel Nikolai Ignatov (1998–1999)
- Colonel Vladimir Demidov (2001)
- Colonel Vladimir Livensky (2002)
- Colonel Sergei Shakurin (2003)

== Books ==
- Kipp, Jacob W.; Warren, Tarn (2003). "The Russian Separate Airborne Brigade – Peacekeeping in Bosnia-Herzegovina". In Mackinlay, John; Cross, Peter (eds.). Regional peacekeepers: The paradox of Russian peacekeeping (PDF). Tokyo: United Nations University. ISBN 92-808-1079-0.
- Thornton, Rod (2011). Organizational Change in the Russian Airborne Forces: The Lessons of the Georgian Conflict. Carlisle, Pennsylvania: Strategic Studies Institute, U.S. Army War College. ISBN 978-1-58487-519-2.
