= Multi-National Division (North) (Bosnia) =

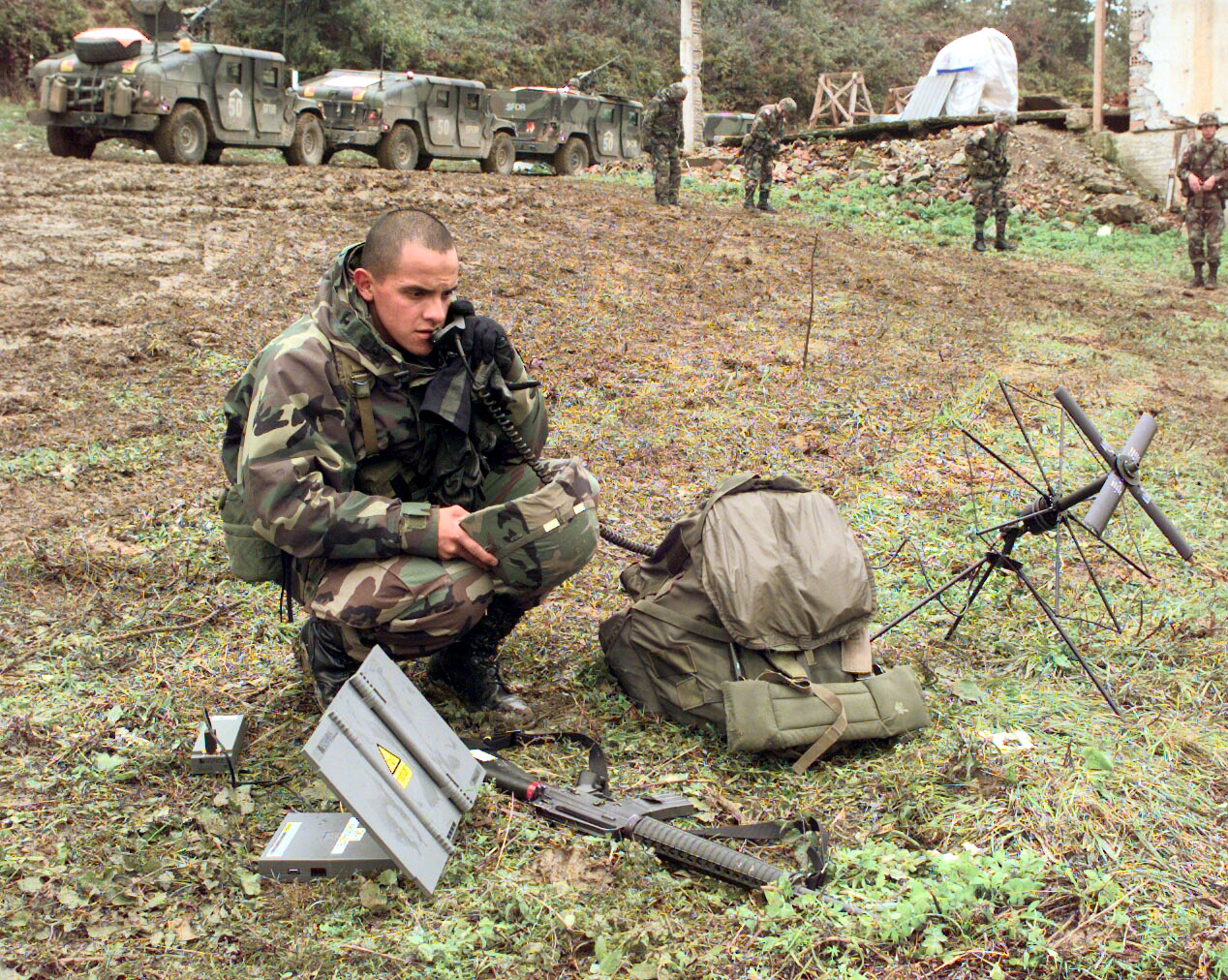
A US Army signaller assigned to Multi-National Division (North) using a satellite phone near the village of Skugric in 1999

Multi-National Division (North) was an international military formation, part of IFOR and then SFOR under NATO command in Bosnia-Hercegovina from 1995. It was based at Tuzla and was American led. Its U.S. designation was Task Force Eagle.

The tasks of the IFOR Land Component were carried out by three Multi National Divisions. Multi-National Division (North) was led by the US Army 1st Armored Division under the command of Major General William L. Nash. It constituted the bulk of the ground forces for Task Force Eagle. They began to deploy on 18 December 1995. MND-N was composed of two U.S. Brigades, a Russian brigade, a Turkish brigade, and the Nordic-Polish Brigade.

- The 1st Separate Airborne Brigade (1 RSAB) of the Russian Airborne Troops, initially under the command of Colonel Aleksandr Ivanovich Lentsov, was part of the Task Force Eagle effort. At first the Brigade consisted of 1,500 soldiers. In the beginning, Russian forces were stationed in five camps (Ugljevik, Priboj, Simin Han, Vukocavci and Spasoevici). One year later, the area of responsibility was given to the command of infantry troops from Saint Petersburg's military region in Russia.
- The 1st Brigade, 1st Armored Division was commanded by Colonel Gregory Fontenot and covered the northwest. The 1AD 2d Brigade, led by Col John Batiste, constituted the southern flank of the US sector, based in Camp Lisa, about 20 km east of Kladanj. Task Force 2-68 Armor, based in Baumholder, Germany (later re-flagged to 1-35 AR), was based in Camp Linda, outside of Olovo. This was the Southern boundary of the US Sector. The 1st Armored Division returned in late 1996 to Germany.
- One of MND-N's components was the Nordic-Polish Brigade (NORDPOLBDE) (Polish: Brygada Nordycko-Polska, see pl:Polski Kontyngent Wojskowy w Bośni i Hercegowinie) which was a multinational brigade of Denmark, Estonia, Finland, Latvia, Lithuania, Norway, Poland, Sweden and USA. It was formed in 1996, and till its disestablishment in 2000 it was stationed in Bosnia and Herzegovina as part of both IFOR and SFOR. The Nordic Support Group at Pécs in Hungary handled the relay of supply, personnel and other logistical tasks between the NORDPOL participating countries and their deployed forces in Bosnia-Herzegovina. It comprised several National Support Elements.
