= Implementation Force =

NATO-led force in Bosnia and Herzegovina (1995–96)

- Pocket badge of the IFOR
- Active: 1995–1996
- Disbanded: December 20, 1996 (succeeded by SFOR)
- Countries: 32 countries
- Type: Command
- Part of: NATO
- Nickname: "IFOR"

The Implementation Force (IFOR) was a NATO-led multinational peace enforcement force in Bosnia and Herzegovina under a one-year mandate from 20 December 1995 to 20 December 1996 under the codename Operation Joint Endeavour.

== Background ==
Italian soldiers detain three men suspected of committing arsons, Grbavica, Sarajevo, 18 March 1996

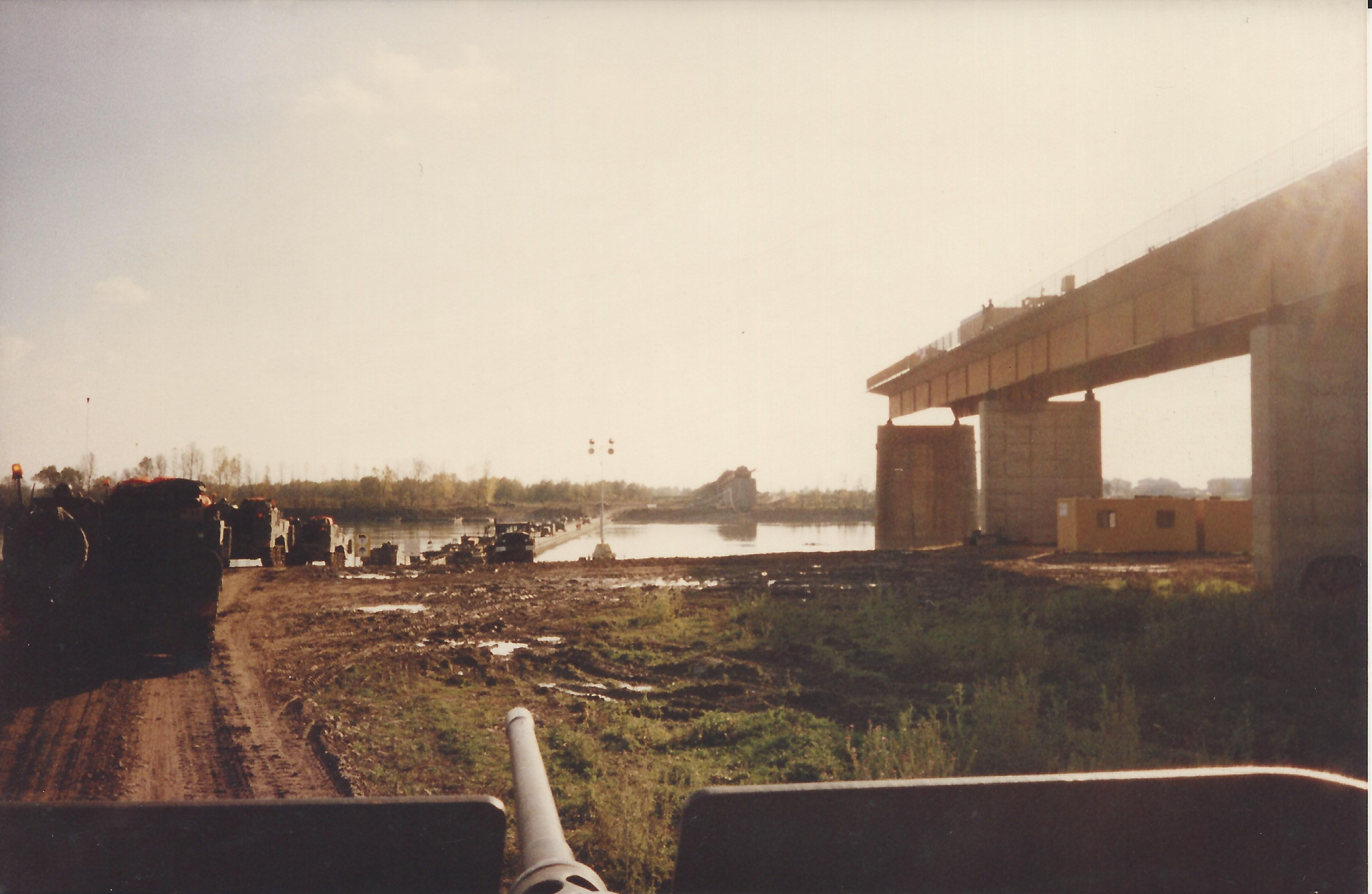
U.S. Army vehicles with IFOR crossing the Sava using a pontoon bridge. The Brčko Bridge, seen at the right, was destroyed in 1992 and was still being reconstructed by U.S. Army engineers when this photo was taken in 1996.

In 1995, NATO was tasked by the United Nations (UN) to carry out the provision of the Dayton Peace Accords ending the Bosnian War. The Dayton Peace Accords were started on 22 November 1995 by the presidents of Bosnia, Croatia, and Serbia, on behalf of Serbia and the Bosnian Serb Republic. The actual signing happened in Paris on 14 December 1995. The peace accords contained a General Framework Agreement and eleven supporting annexes with maps. The accords had three major goals: ending of hostilities, authorization of military and civilian program going into effect, and the establishment of a central Bosnian government while excluding individuals who are serving sentences or under indictment by the International War Crimes Tribunals from taking part in the running of the government. IFOR's specific role was to implement the military Annexes of The General Framework Agreement for Peace (GFAP) in Bosnia and Herzegovina.

IFOR relieved the UN peacekeeping force UNPROFOR, which had originally arrived in 1992, and the transfer of authority was discussed in Security Council Resolution 1031. Almost 60,000 NATO soldiers in addition to forces from non-NATO nations were deployed to Bosnia. Operation Decisive Endeavor (SACEUR OPLAN 40105), beginning 6 December 1995, was a subcomponent of Joint Endeavor. IFOR began operations on 20 December 1995.

The Dayton Agreement resulted from a long series of events, notably, the failures of EU-led peace plans, the August 1995 Croat Operation Storm and fleeing of 200,000 Serb civilians, the Bosnian Serb war crimes, in particular the Srebrenica massacre, and the seizure of UNPROFOR peace-keepers as human shields against NATO's Operation Deliberate Force.

U.S. Secretary of Defense William Perry and his Russian counterpart, Pavel Grachev agreed on 8 October that the peacekeeping operation name will be Implementation Force of the Peace Agreement on Bosnia-Herzegovina, that is without reference to NATO; other differences were unresolved at that time (chain of command, area of command and control). On 27 October they agreed that "the Russian unit will not be part of the NATO peacekeeping force, but will perform special engineering, transport and construction activites [sic]". However, "President Clinton relied on UN resolutions and NATO agreements as sufficient authority to use military force in Bosnia without first seeking congressional approval."

Admiral Leighton W. Smith Jr., Commander in Chief Allied Forces Southern Europe (CINCSOUTH), served as the first Joint Force Commander for the operation, also known as Commander IFOR (COMIFOR). He commanded the operation from IFOR's deployment on 20 December 1995 from headquarters in Zagreb, and later from March 1996 from the Residency in Sarajevo. Admiral Thomas J. Lopez commanded the operation from 31 July to 7 November 1996, followed by General William W. Crouch until 20 December 1996. Lt Gen Michael Walker, Commander Allied Rapid Reaction Corps (ARRC), acted as Land Component Commander for the operation, commanding from HQ ARRC (Forward) based initially in Kiseljak, and from late January 1996 from HQ ARRC (Main) in Ilidža. This was NATO's first ever out-of-area land deployment. The Land Component's part of the operation was known as Operation Firm Endeavour.

At its height, IFOR involved troops from 32 countries and numbered some 54,000 soldiers in-country (BiH) and around 80,000 involved soldiers in total (with support and reserve troops stationed in Croatia, Hungary, Germany, and Italy and also on ships in the Adriatic Sea). In the initial phases of the operation, much of the initial composition of IFOR consisted of units which had been part of UNPROFOR but remained in place and simply replaced their United Nations insignia with IFOR insignia.

== Components ==
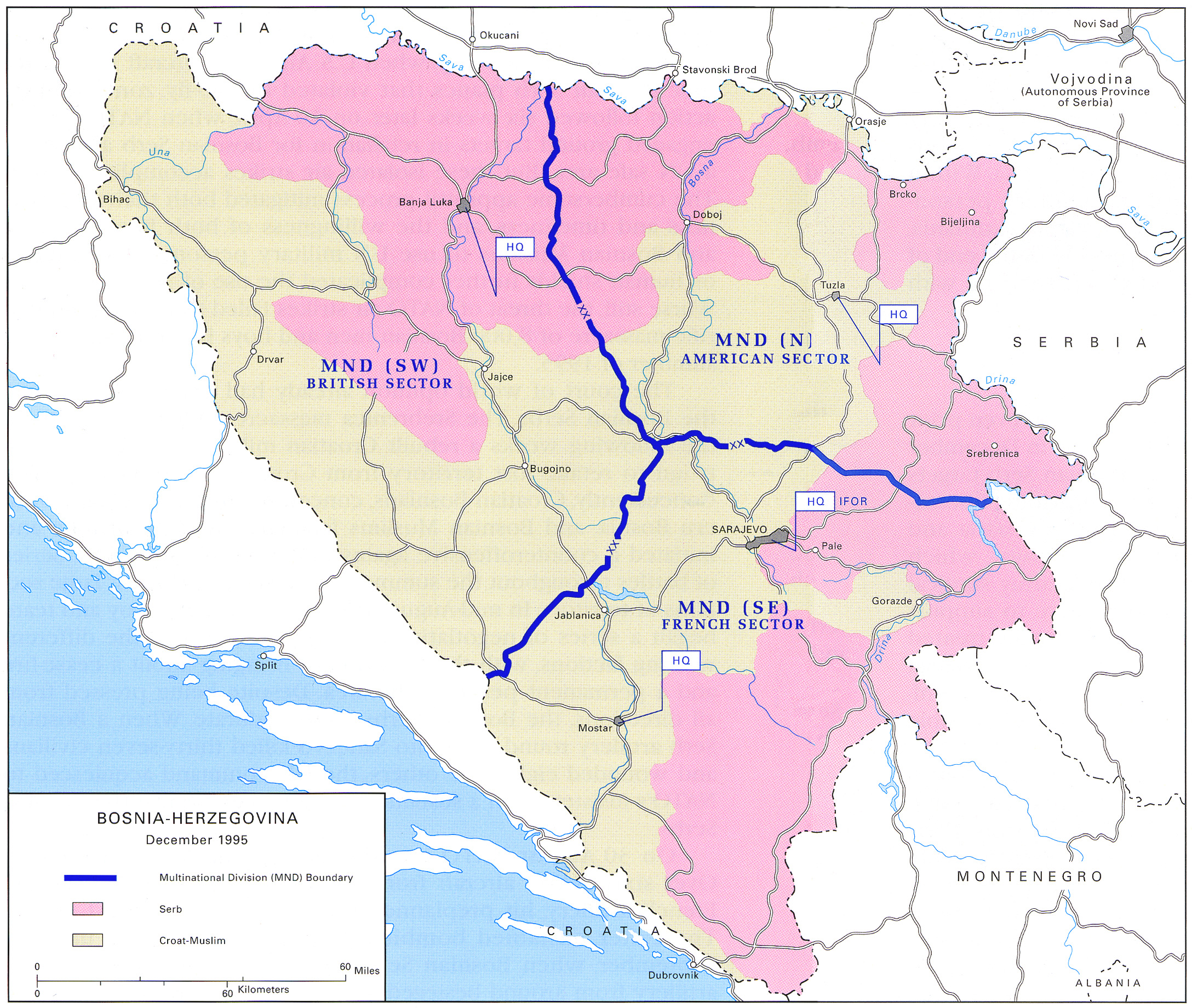
Map of the International Sectors under the Peace Agreement

NATO member states that contributed forces included Belgium, Canada, Denmark, France, Germany, Italy, Luxembourg, the Netherlands, Norway, Portugal, Spain, Turkey, the United Kingdom, and the United States. Non-NATO nations that contributed forces included; Australia, Austria, Bangladesh, the Czech Republic, Egypt, Estonia, Finland, Hungary, Latvia, Lithuania, Malaysia, Morocco, New Zealand, Pakistan, Poland, Romania, Slovakia, Sweden, Russia, and Ukraine.

The tasks of the Land Component were carried out by three Multi National Divisions:

- Multi-National Division (South-East), Mostar – French led. Also known as the 'Division Salamandre.' The divisional headquarters was provided by 6th Light Armoured Division then 7th Armoured Division.
  - French Brigade Alpha, Jablanica
    - 2nd Foreign Parachute Regiment
    - Moroccan Battalion - Igman
  - French Brigade Bravo, Sarajevo
    - 6th Marine Infantry Parachute Regiment
    - 21st Marine Infantry Regiment
    - Ukrainian 240th Separate Special Battalion
  - Italian Bersaglieri Brigade "Garibaldi", Sarajevo
    - 8th Bersaglieri Regiment
    - Portuguese 2nd Airborne Infantry Battalion
    - Egyptian Battalion
  - 42nd Spanish Mountain Brigade "Aragón", Medjugorje - Col Julio López-Guarch Muro
    - 64th Mountain Cazadores Regiment “Galicia” - Morstar
    - 11th Light Armored Cavalry Regiment "España" - Trebinje
- Multi-National Division (South-West), Banja Luka – British led. The British codename for their armed forces' involvement in IFOR was Operation Resolute. Division headquarters was provided by 3 (UK) Division then 1st (UK) Armoured Division.
  - 4th UK Armoured Brigade, Šipovo - Brig Richard Dannatt
    - 2nd Bn, The Light Infantry
    - 1st Bn, Royal Regiment of Fusiliers
    - Dutch 42nd Bn, Regiment Limburgse Jagers - Šišava
    - Malaysian 2nd Bn, Royal Ranger Regiment - Livno
  - 2nd Canadian Mechanized Brigade, Ćoralići - Brig Gen Bruce Jeffries
    - A Sqdn, Royal Canadian Dragoons
    - Queen's Royal Hussars - Mrkonjić Grad
    - Czech 6th Mechanized Infantry Battalion - Ljubija
- Multi-National Division (North), Camp Eagle at Tuzla – US led. Task Force Eagle. The US Army 1st Armored Division under the command of Major General William L. Nash, constituted the bulk of the ground forces for Task Force Eagle. They began to deploy on 18 December 1995 and would return to Germany in late 1996.
  - 1st Brigade, 1st Armored Division, Camp Kime - Col Gregory Fontenot.
    - 1st Sqdn, 1st Cavalry - Camp Gentry
    - 3rd Bn, 5th Cavalry - Camp McGovern
    - 4th Bn, 67th Armor - Camp Stephens
  - 2nd Brigade, 1st Armored Division, Camp Lisa - Col John Batiste
    - 3rd Sqdn, 4th Cavalry - Camp Molly, Camp Alicia
    - 4th Bn, 12th infantry - Camp Demi, Camp Pat
    - 2nd Bn, 68th Armor - Camp Linda
  - 1st Russian Separate Airborne Brigade, Camp Ugljevik - Col Alexander Ivanovich Lentsov
    - 1st Airborne Battalion - Priboj
    - 2nd Airborne Battalion - Simin Han
  - Nordic-Polish Brigade, Doboj - Danish Brigadegeneral Finn Særmark-Thomsen
    - Danish Battalion (Estonia, Latvia and Lithuania each provided a platoon size element to reinforce the battalion) - Camp Dannevirke, Camp Valhalla
    - Swedish Battalion - Camp Oden
    - Polish Battalion - Teslić, Žepče
    - Finnish Engineer Battalion - Camp Jussi
    - Norwegian Logistics Battalion - Modrica
  - Turkish Brigade, Zenica - Col Ahmet Berberoglu
    - Turkish Battalion
    - Romanian Engineer Battalion

On 20 December 1996, the task of IFOR was taken over by SFOR. In turn, SFOR was replaced by the European EUFOR Althea force in 2004.

NATO began to create service medals once it began to support peacekeeping in the former Yugoslavia, which led to the award to IFOR troops of the NATO Medal.

== Gallery ==
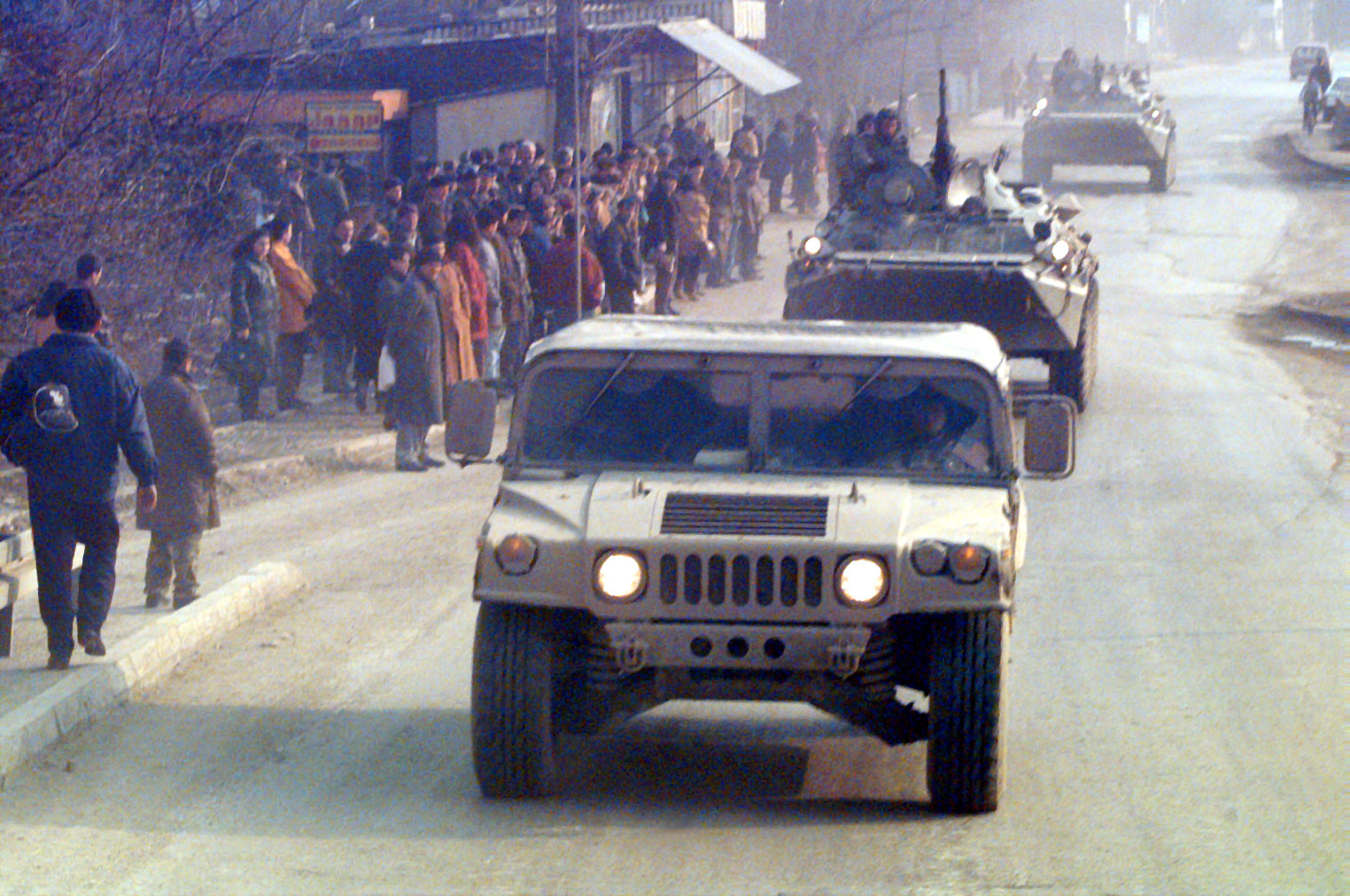
Two Russian BTR-80 APCs following an American Humvee in Zvornik

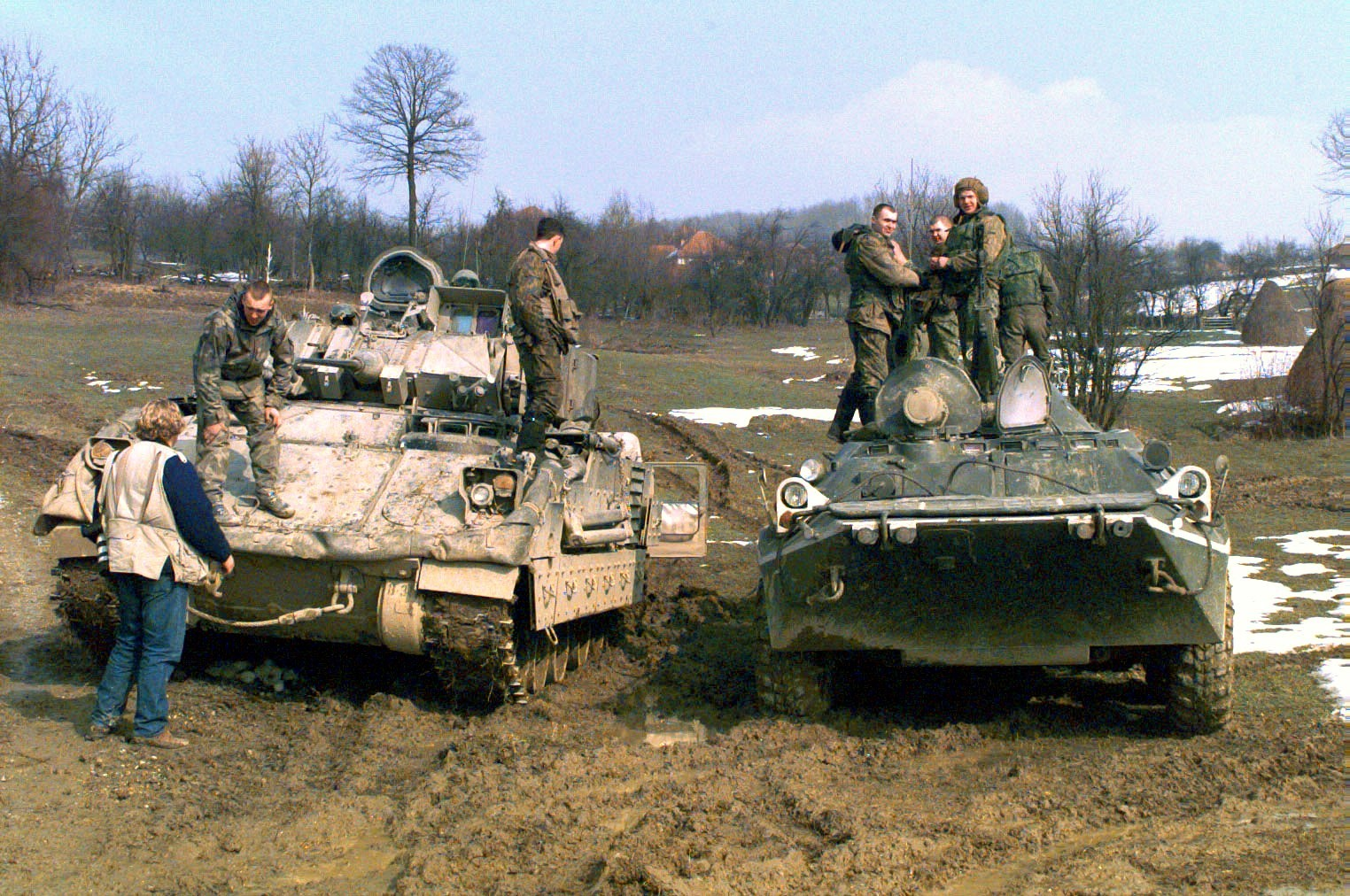
An American M2 Bradley and a Russian BTR-80 during a patrol near Zvornik

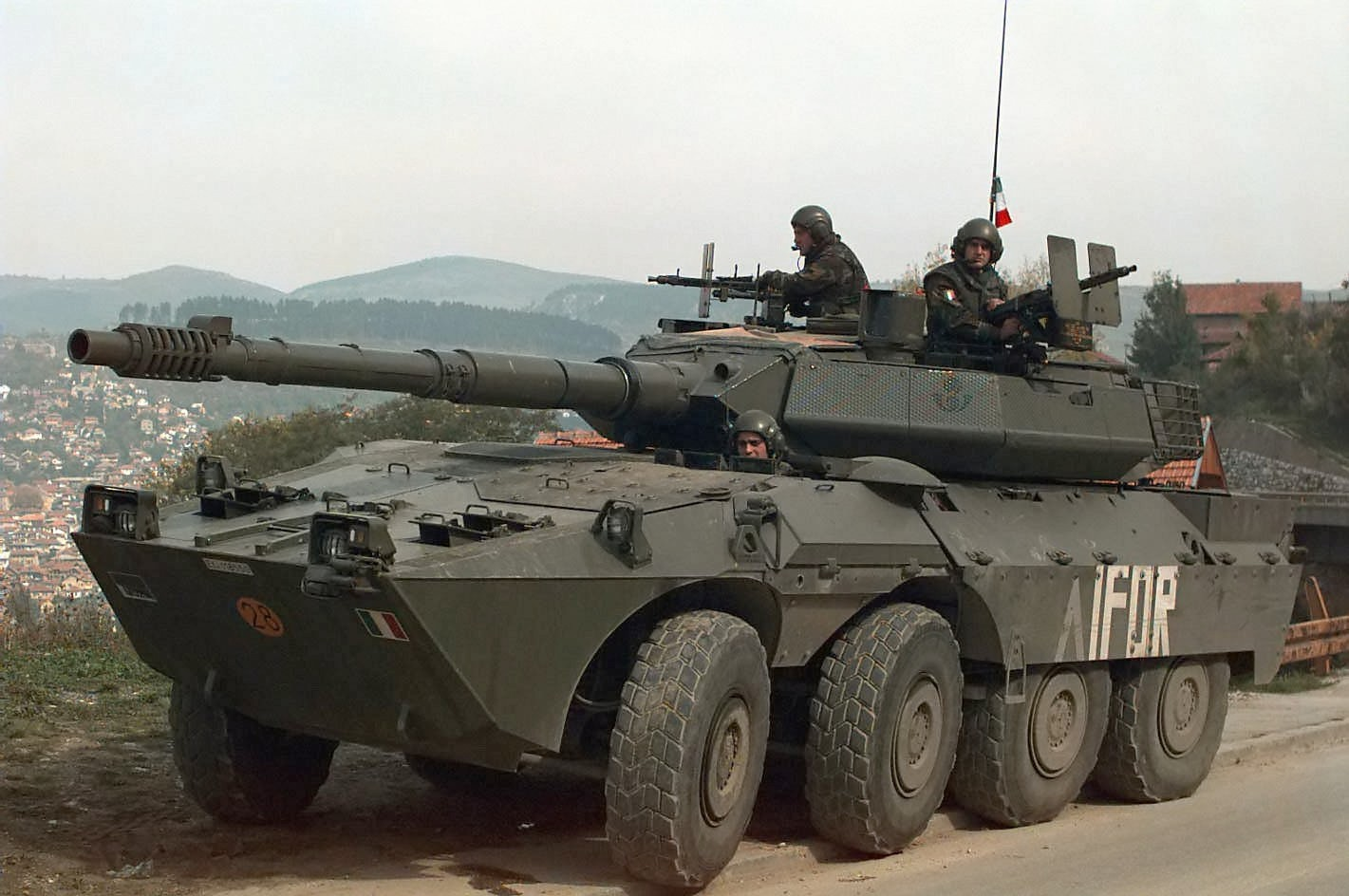
An Italian Army B1 Centauro during a patrol in Bosnia-Herzegovina as part of IFOR during 1996

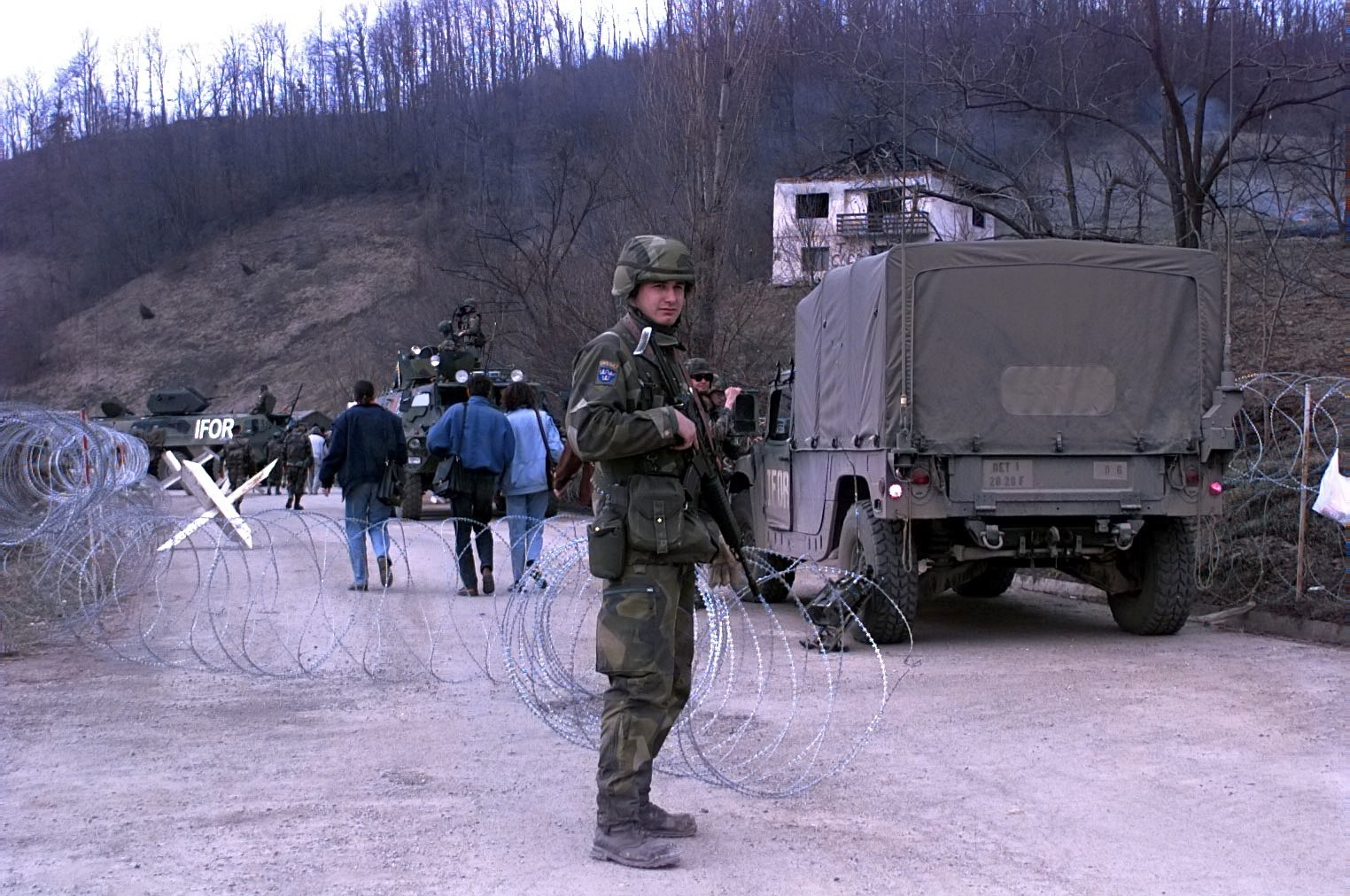
A Swedish soldier manning a civilian checkpoint leading to the Joint Civilian Commission meeting in Doboj

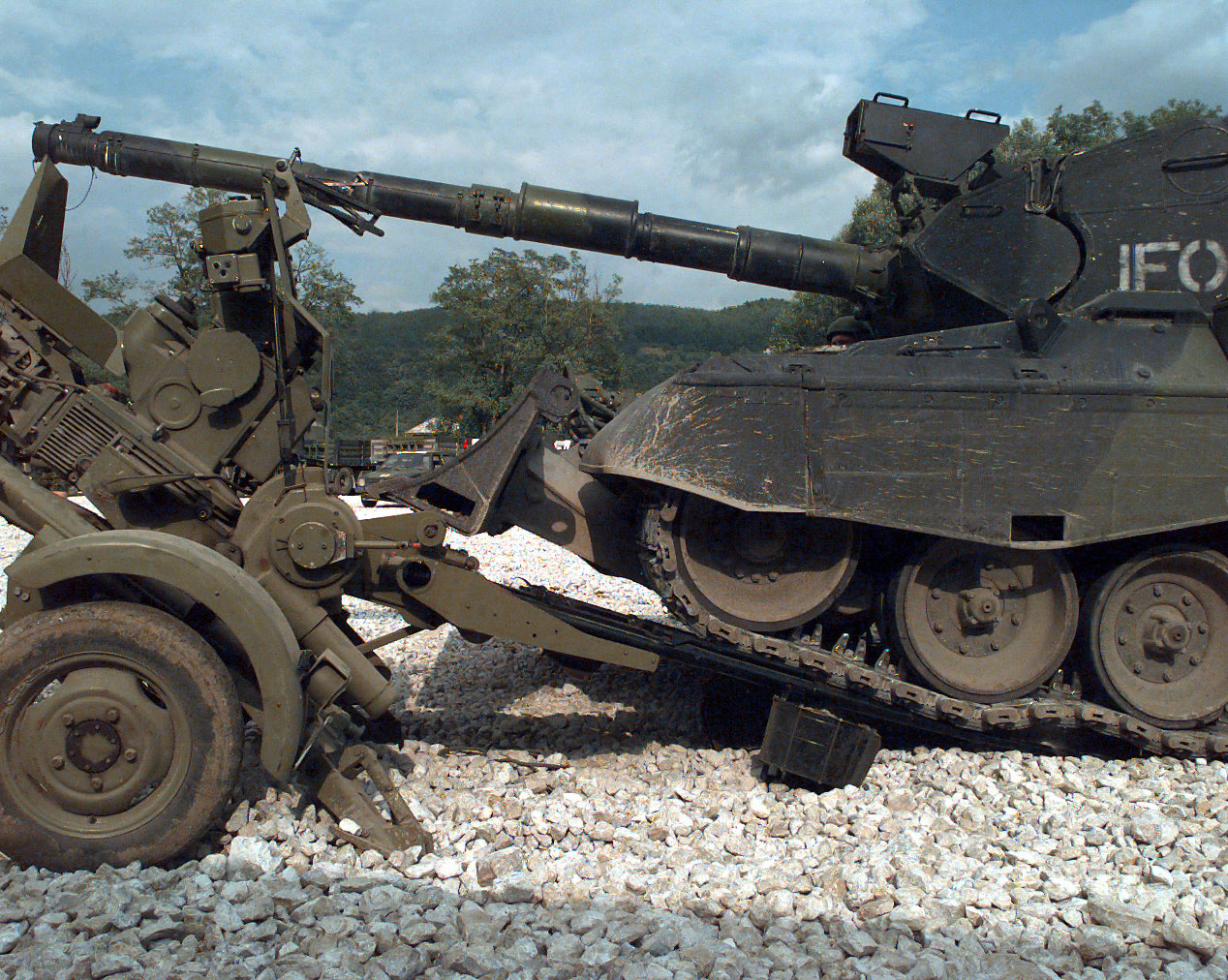
A Danish Leopard 1 preparing to drive over and crush a Serbian Zastava M55 anti-air gun

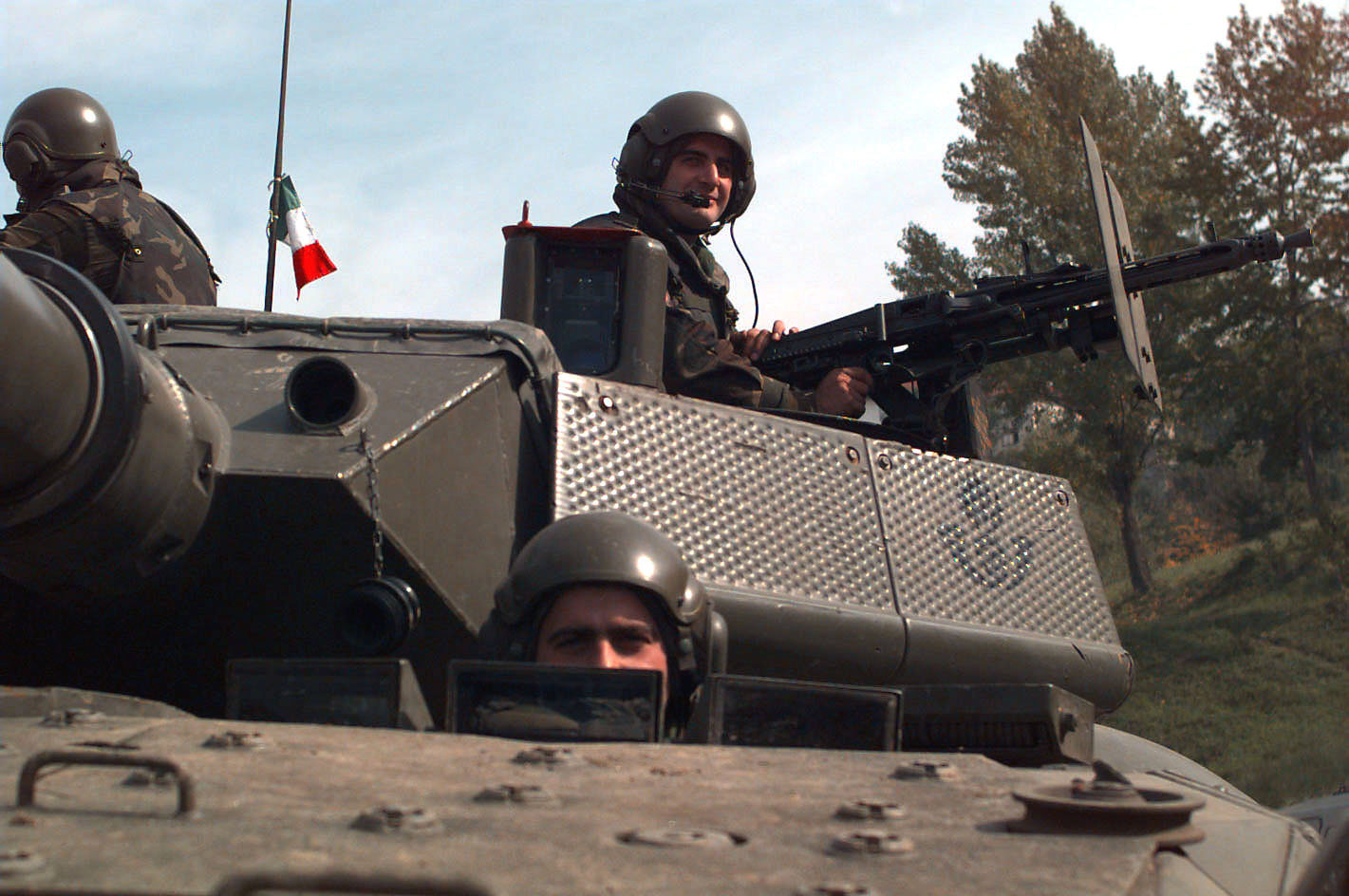
The crew of an Italian B1 Centauro deployed as part of IFOR

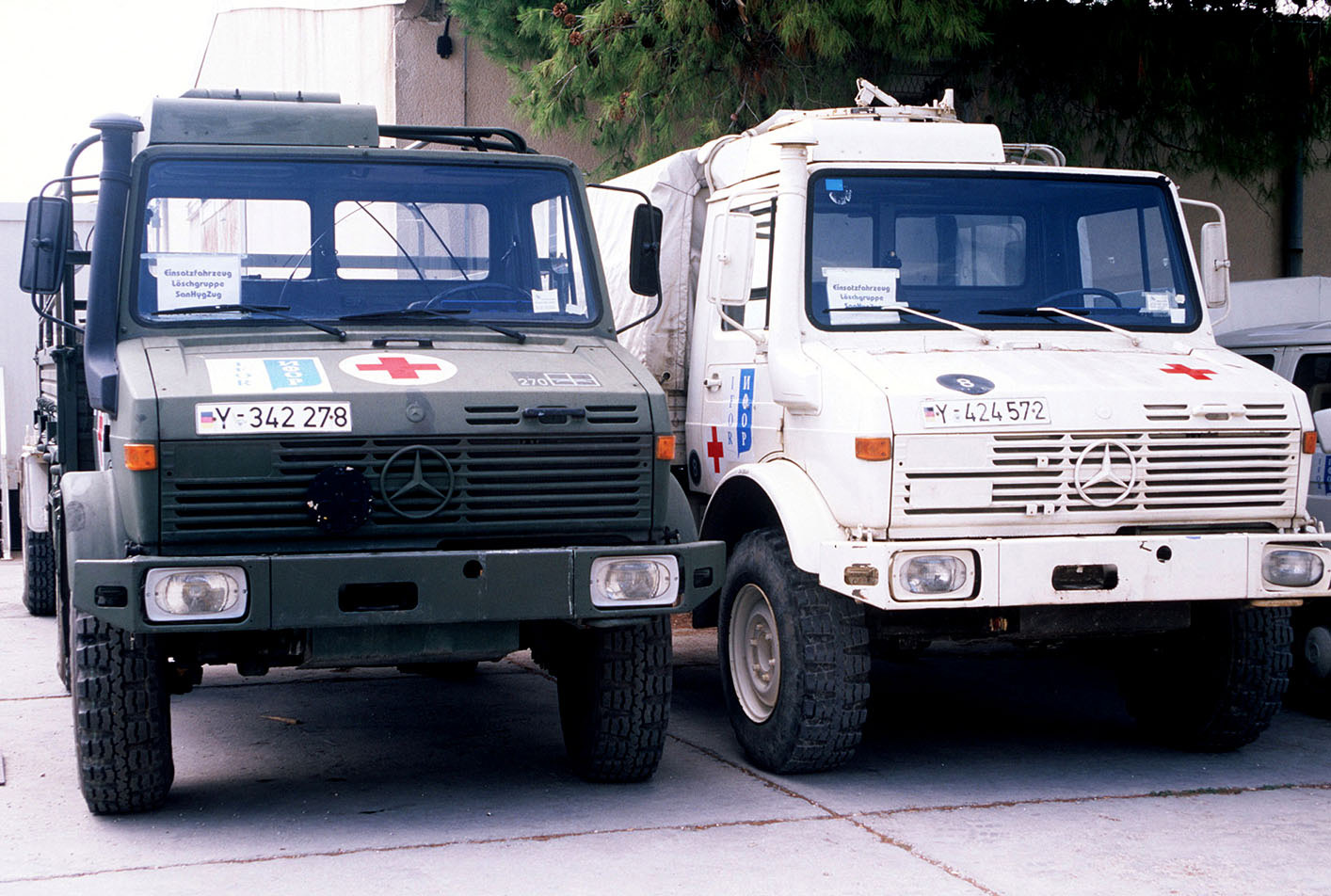
German Unimog medical vehicles in Trogir

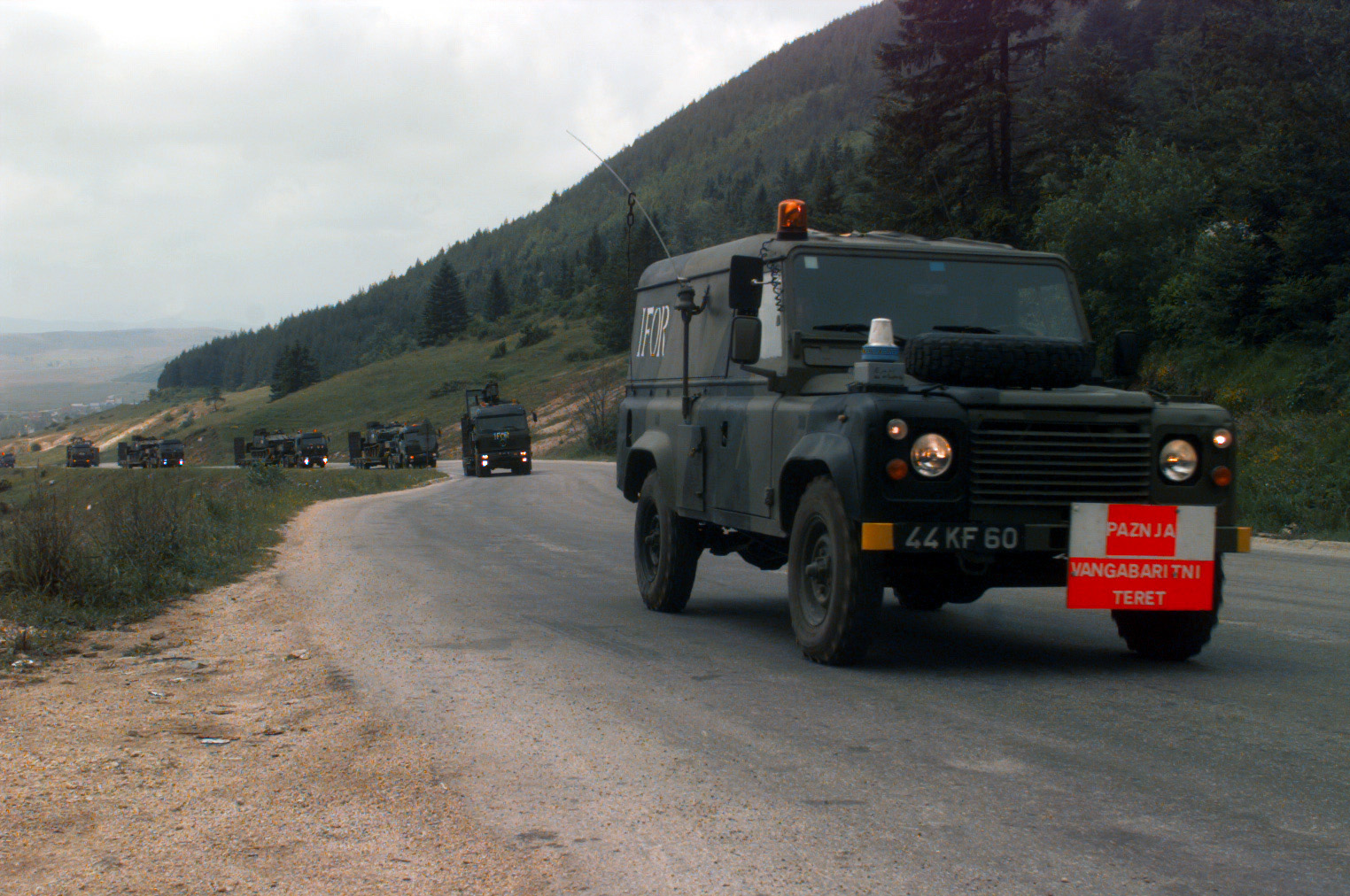
A British convoy passing through Kupres

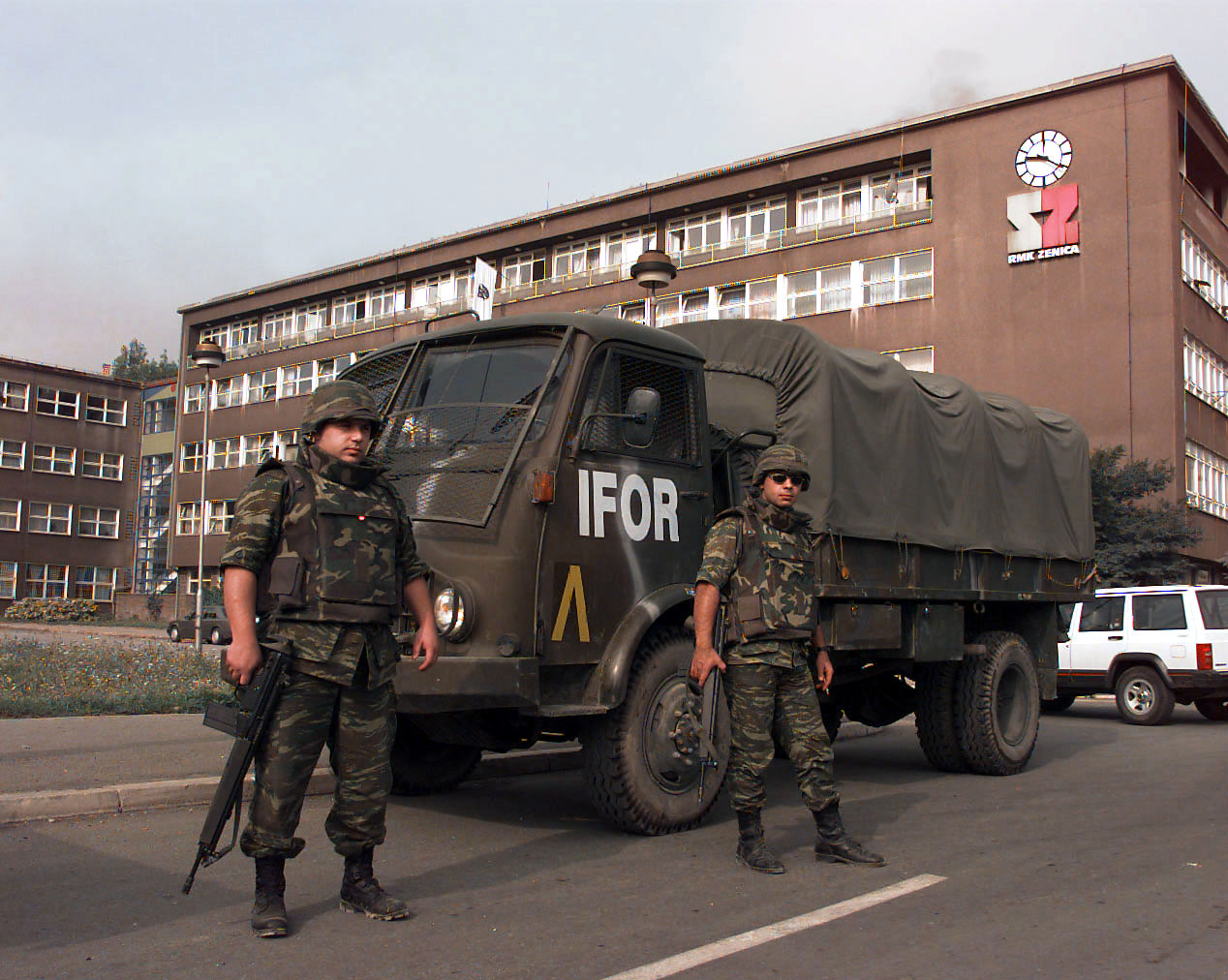
Greek soldiers guarding a truck carrying polling equipment for the 1996 Bosnian general election in Zenica

== See also ==
- National Support Group
- Operation Determined Effort
