= Anatoly Shkirko =

Soviet-Russian military leader (born 1947)

- Анатолий Шкирко

Commander-in-Chief of the Internal Troops of Russia
- In office 28 December 1995 – 24 July 1997
- Preceded by: Anatoly Romanov
- Succeeded by: Leonty Shevtsov

Personal details
- Born: 13 September 1947 (age 79) Grozny, Grozny Oblast, Soviet Union
- Education: Kirov Ordzhonikidzevskoe MOOP Military School; Frunze Military Academy; Voroshilov General Staff Military Academy

Military service
- Allegiance: Soviet Union; Russia
- Branch/service: Soviet Internal Troops; Russian Internal Troops
- Years of service: 1965-1997
- Rank: Colonel general
- Battles/wars: White House storming First Chechen War

Anatoly Afanasyevich Shkirko (Russian: Анатолий Афанасьевич Шкирко: born September 13, 1947 in Grozny, Soviet Union) is a Soviet and Russian military leader, Colonel General who served as Deputy Minister of Internal Affairs of the Russian Federation and commander-in-chief of the Internal Troops of the Ministry of Internal Affairs of Russia from 1995 to 1997.

== Biography ==
Born into a working class family, he graduated from high school in 1965. He graduated from the Kirov Ordzhonikidzevskoe MOOP Military School (1965-1968). He Served in the internal troops of the Ministry of Internal Affairs of the Soviet Union in the city of Kaunas, Lithuanian SSR: First, as platoon commander and from 1969 as secretary of the Komsomol committee of the battalion. From 1971 to 1972 he served as assistant to the chief of staff of the regiment.

Graduated from the Frunze Military Academy (1972-1975). He served in the Urals as battalion commander of the escort brigade in Sosva and from 1978 as chief of staff of the regiment in Sverdlovsk, commander of the training regiment and commander of the escort regiment. From March 1985 he served as chief of staff of the division and from September 1987 to 1989 as commander of the division of the internal troops of the Ministry of Internal Affairs of the USSR. In 1991 he graduated from the Voroshilov General Staff Military Academy.

Further service was carried out from July 1991 as the head of the Directorate of the Internal Troops of the Ministry of Internal Affairs of the USSR for Western Siberia, from October 1992 as the head of the operational department and deputy chief of staff of the Main Directorate of the Internal Troops (1992-1993), from September 1993 he served as deputy commander of the Internal Troops of the Ministry of Internal Affairs of Russia. Participant in the October events in Moscow in 1993 on the side of President Boris Yeltsin.

He participant in the First Chechen War: From February 1995 he served as Deputy Commander of the Internal Troops for emergency situations. From July 25, 1995 he served as Chief of Staff and First Deputy Commander of the Internal Troops of the Ministry of Internal Affairs of Russia, and simultaneously from October 1995 as Commander of the United Group of Federal Forces on the Territory of the Chechen Republic. From December 28, 1995 to July 24, 1997 he served as Commander of the Internal Troops of the Ministry of Internal Affairs of Russia and Deputy Minister of Internal Affairs of the Russian Federation. In 1997, he was dismissed from military service upon reaching the maximum age for military service.

He Chairman of the Central Board of the All-Russian Union of Disabled Persons of the Internal Troops, Armed Forces, Border Troops, Security Services, Sports and Law Enforcement Agencies.

He was nominated in the 1999 parliamentary elections to the State Duma from the bloc For Civil Dignity (No. 3 on the list). According to the election results, the bloc received 0.61% of the votes and was unable to overcome electoral barrier.

Since April 2006 he served as Chairman of the Board of Directors of the Klimovsk Specialized Ammunition Plant.

== Awards ==
- Order of CourageAnatoly Shkirko
- Order "For Service to the Homeland in the Armed Forces of the USSR"Anatoly Shkirko
- Medal "For Courage"Anatoly Shkirko
- Jubilee Medal "In Commemoration of the 100th Anniversary of the Birth of Vladimir Ilyich Lenin"Anatoly Shkirko
- Medal "Veteran of the Armed Forces of the USSR"Anatoly Shkirko
- Jubilee Medal "50 Years of the Armed Forces of the USSR"Anatoly Shkirko
- Jubilee Medal "60 Years of the Armed Forces of the USSR"Anatoly Shkirko
- Jubilee Medal "70 Years of the Armed Forces of the USSR"Anatoly Shkirko
- Medal "For Impeccable Service"Anatoly Shkirko
