= Operation Determined Effort =

Operation Determined Effort was a 1994 plan developed by NATO to assist in the withdrawal of UNPROFOR from Bosnia, if such a withdrawal became necessary. Determined Effort was never executed, but its planning formed the basis for Operation Joint Endeavor, and the commitment to deploy the United States armed forces to Bosnia under the plan was of great political significance.
