= National Support Group =

Nordic (Polish) Support Group (NSG) was a logistics unit under the NATO led IFOR and later SFOR forces (deployed to the former Yugoslavia) to establish and maintain peace, as well as to undertake administrative, supportive and humanitary tasks.

The NSG, which was situated in Pécs in southern Hungary, consisted of separate National Support Elements from the participating countries: Sweden, Denmark, Finland, Norway, Poland. Close cooperation was also established with forces from United States, Estonia, Latvia, Lithuania.
