= Kholmskaya =

Rural locality in Abinsky District, Krasnodar Krai, Russia

Coordinates: 44°51′N 38°23′E

Kholmskaya (Russian: Хо́лмская) is a rural locality (a stanitsa) in Abinsky District of Krasnodar Krai, Russia, located on the shores of the Sukhoy Khabl River. Municipally, it is a part of Kholmskoye Rural Settlement in Abinsky Municipal District. Population: 17,585 (2010 census); 17,271 (2002 Census).

It was founded by the Azov Cossacks in 1863.
