= Šišava =

Šišava Шишава
- Village
- Location within Bosnia and Herzegovina
- Coordinates: 44°18′39″N 17°33′42″E
- Country: Bosnia and Herzegovina
- Canton: Central Bosnia
- Elevation: 1,265 m (4,150 ft)

Population (2013 census)
  - Total: 100 (approximately)
- Time zone: UTC+1 (CET)
  - Summer (DST): UTC+2 (CEST)
- Area code: ++387

Šišava (Serbian Cyrillic: Шишава) is a village located on the slopes of Vlašić Mountain, central Bosnia, in the Travnik Municipality of the Federation of Bosnia and Herzegovina.

== Population ==
Šišavs; Census Year 2013: Total of 200 inhabitants
Census Year	1991	1981	1971
Serbs	612 (98,71%)	N/A (00,00%)	N/A (00,00%)
Croats	1 (0,16%)	N/A (00,00%)	N/A (00,00%)
Yugoslavs	1 (0,16%)	N/A (00,00%)	N/A (00,00%)
Others and unknown	6 (0,97%)	N/A (00,00%)	N/A (00,00%)
Total	620	707	755
