= George Joulwan =

United States Army general

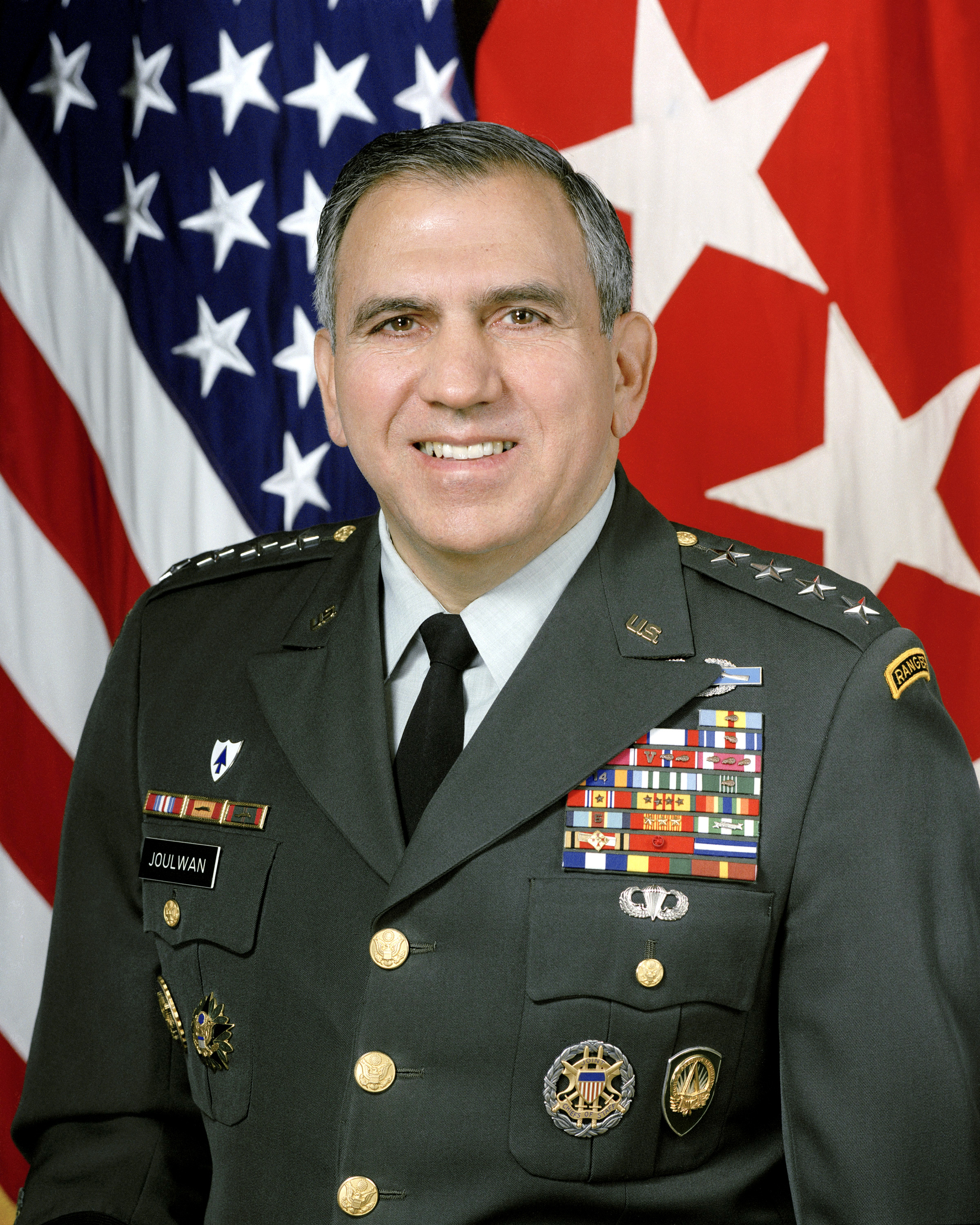
- George Joulwan
- Born: 16 November 1939 (age 86); Pottsville, Pennsylvania, U.S.
- Military career
- Allegiance: United States of America
- Branch: United States Army
- Rank: General
- Commands: United States Southern Command; V Corps; 3rd Armored Division; Supreme Allied Commander Europe
- Conflicts: Vietnam War
- Awards: Defense Distinguished Service Medal (3); Army Distinguished Service Medal; Silver Star (2); Legion of Merit (2); Bronze Star (3)(V); Meritorious Service Medal (4); Air Medal (14); Joint Service Commendation Medal; Army Commendation Medal (2)

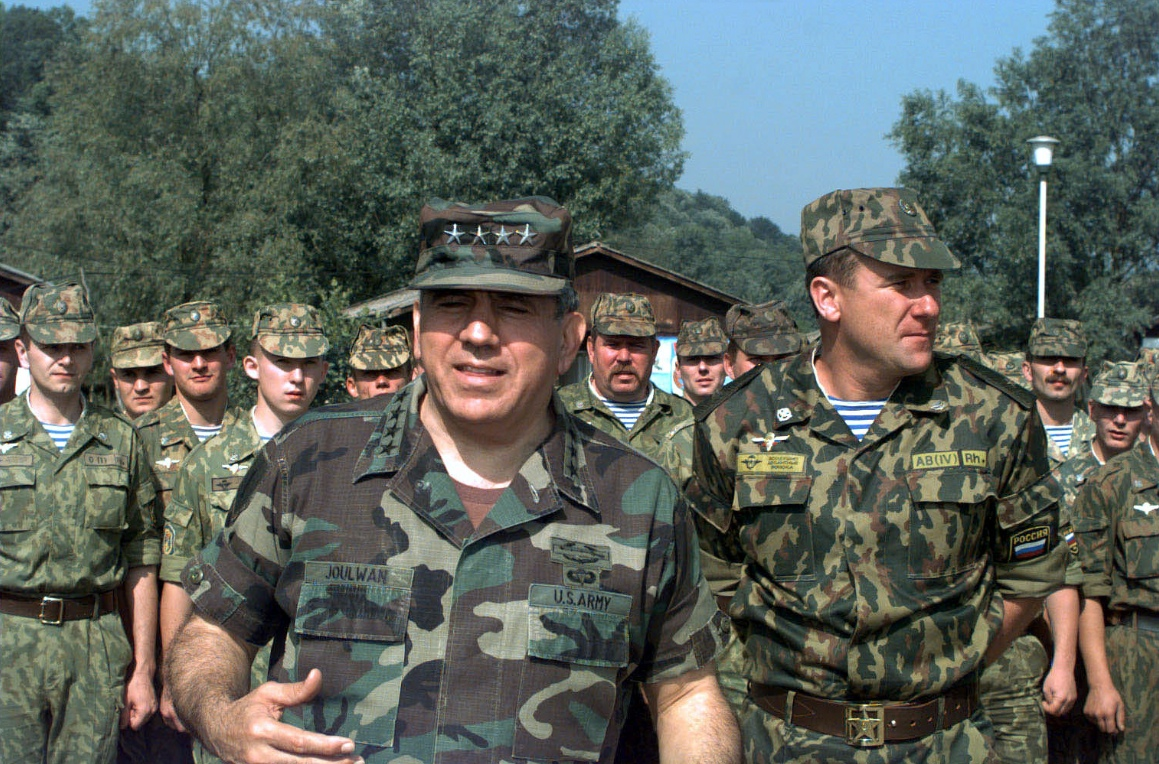
General George Joulwan and a Russian colonel general Alexander Lentsov visiting Bosnia and Herzegovina with Russian soldiers during his tenure as Supreme Allied Commander Europe.

George Alfred Joulwan (born 16 November 1939, Pottsville, Pennsylvania) is a retired United States Army general who served for 36 years. He finished his military career as the Commander-in-Chief of the United States European Command and NATO's Supreme Allied Commander (SACEUR) in 1997.

As the Supreme Allied Commander, he conducted over 20 operations in the Balkans, Africa, and the Middle East. When the United States sent forces into Bosnia in the 1990s, General Joulwan played the leading role in troop deployment, earning praise by President Clinton upon Joulwan's retirement.

As SACEUR, General Joulwan created a strategic policy for the United States military engagement in Africa, which was the first time in U.S. history that such a policy had been crafted.

== Military career ==
His efforts have built a foundation for a Europe that is safe, secure, and democratic well into the 21st century. . . . General Joulwan's leadership and wise counsel will truly be missed in the senior decision-making ranks of our national security structure.

— President William J. Clinton's statement
on the retirement of General Joulwan
23 December 1996

=== West Point ===
George Joulwan earned his college degree at the United States Military Academy at West Point. At West Point, he played football and basketball, earning two varsity letters as a football lineman. Later in his career, General Joulwan earned a master's degree from Loyola University (Chicago) in political science.

=== Vietnam ===
General Joulwan served from June 1966 to November 1967 and from June 1971 to January 1972 in Vietnam. He attended the Army War College, and served on the Staff and Faculty until 1979. He commanded the 2nd Brigade, 3rd Infantry Division (Mechanized), from June 1979 to September 1981, when he became Chief of Staff, 3rd Infantry Division.

=== White House ===
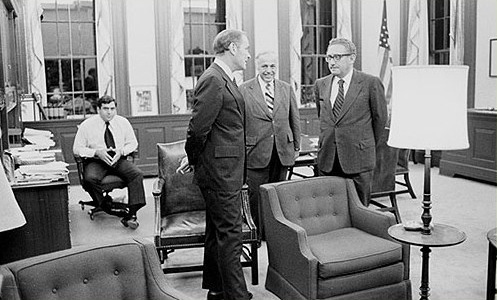
Major George Joulwan (Seated, far left) while serving as special assistant to The White House Chief of Staff General Alexander Haig at Haig's office in the White House with Secretary of State Henry Kissinger, 8 August 1974

Joulwan served as special assistant to General Alexander Haig while still a Major within the U.S. Army, when Haig was serving as White House Chief of Staff from 4 May 1973 to 21 September 1974.

=== National leadership ===
He served in various functions at the Pentagon from 1982 until June 1986, when he became the Deputy Chief of Staff for Operations, United States Army Europe and U.S. Seventh Army, Germany.

In March 1988 he was given command of the 3rd Armored Division and in 1989 he became Commanding General, U.S. V Corps.

From November 1990 until October 1993 he was Commander in Chief of United States Southern Command.

=== International leadership ===
He served as the Supreme Allied Commander, Europe (SACEUR) from 1993 to 1997, when he was succeeded by General Wesley Clark. He retired from command after serving in NATO.

Highlights of General George Joulwan's military assignments
Year	Assignment	Emblem	Location
1963	Commander in the Infantry: First Battalion, 30th Infantry, 3rd Division		Europe
1964	Battalion Operations Officer (S-3): First Battalion, 26th Infantry of the First Division		Vietnam
1968	Assistant professor of Military Sciences: Loyola University Chicago		Chicago, IL
1971	101st Airborne Division		Vietnam
1972	Department of Tactics, United States Military Academy at West Point		West Point, NY
1973	Aide-de-Camp to the Vice Chief of Staff of the United States Army		Washington
1973	Special Assistant to the President of the United States, Richard M. Nixon		Washington
1975	Special Assistant to the Supreme Allied Commander, Europe		Europe
1975	Commander of the First Battalion of the 26th Infantry		Germany
1977	Student (and later staff and faculty) at United States Army War College		Pennsylvania
1979	Commanded the 2nd Brigade of the 3rd Infantry Division		Germany
1981	Division Chief of Staff, 3rd Infantry Division		Germany
1982	Office of the Joint Chiefs of Staff		Arlington, VA
1983	Director of Force Development, Department of the Army		Pentagon, Washington, D.C.
1985	Deputy Chief of Staff for Operations, U.S. Army Europe and Seventh Army		Germany
1988	Commander of the 3rd Armored Division		Germany
1989	Commanding General of the V Corps		Germany
1990	Commander-in-Chief, United States Southern Command		Panama, El Salvador and other locations
1993–1997	Commander-in-Chief, United States European Command and Supreme Allied Commander		Europe, worldwide

== Post-military career ==
General Joulwan sits on the board of directors of Emergent BioSolutions, a biotechnology company, after a referral to the post by Allen Shofe, an executive at Emergent.

His other post-military positions have included:

- President of Team One, a consulting firm
- Senior Advisor of Global USA Inc, a government relations and consulting firm
- Board member for General Dynamics Corporation
- Professor at the United States Military Academy at West Point
- Member of the board of trustees for the United States Military Academy

He has also served as a military analyst for Fox News Channel. Notably, he appeared on Fox News Sunday a few weeks after 11 September 2001, with White House Chief of Staff Andrew Card and Senate Armed Forces chairman Carl Levin to discuss his experience in war planning and the American military's planning with regards to Afghanistan.

== Citizenship and philanthropy ==
General Joulwan has also served the St. Jude Children's Research Hospital as the Chair Emeritus of the Gourmet Gala Committee. A public park in Pottsville, Pennsylvania was named in his honor.

== Personal life ==
General Joulwan had a twin brother, James Joseph Joulwan, who died in 2013. General Joulwan is of Lebanese Maronite heritage. He is married and has eight grandchildren. George comes from a distinguished military family. His father fought with the US Navy in WWI, and his cousin fought with the US Army in WWII and was captured twice.

== Awards and decorations ==
Combat Infantryman Badge
Expert Infantry Badge
Parachutist Badge
Ranger Tab
Presidential Service Badge
Army Staff Identification Badge
Joint Chiefs of Staff Identification Badge
SACEUR Badge
26th Infantry Regiment Distinctive Unit Insignia

Defense Distinguished Service Medal (with two oak leaf clusters)
Army Distinguished Service Medal
Silver Star (with oak leaf cluster)
Legion of Merit (with oak leaf cluster)
Bronze Star (with valor device and two oak leaf clusters)
Meritorious Service Medal (with three oak leaf clusters)
Air Medal (with award numeral 14)
Joint Service Commendation Medal
Army Commendation Medal (with oak leaf cluster)
Valorous Unit Award
National Defense Service Medal
Vietnam Service Medal (with four bronze service star)
Army Service Ribbon
Overseas Service Ribbon (with award numeral 5)
Legion of Honor (Bolivia)
Military Order of the White Lion, Second Class (Czech Republic)
Gold Medal for Distinguished Service (El Salvador)
Légion d'Honneur, Officier (France)
Knight Commanders' Cross of the Order of Merit of the Federal Republic of Germany (Germany)
Hesse Order of Merit (Germany)
Cross of Merit of the Armed Forces (Honduras)
Commander Cross with Star of the Order of Merit of the Republic of Hungary
Grand Officer of the Order of Vasco Núñez de Balboa (Panama)
Commander Cross with Star of the Order of Merit of the Republic of Poland
Romanian Emblem of Honor
Honour of Merit (Venezuela)
Vietnam Gallantry Cross with three gold stars (Vietnam)
Vietnam Gallantry Cross Unit Citation (Vietnam)
Civil Actions Medal Unit Citation (Vietnam)
Vietnam Campaign Medal with "1960–"-device (Vietnam)

Military offices
Preceded by Gen. Maxwell R. Thurman	United States Southern Command; 1991—1993	Succeeded by Gen. Barry R. McCaffrey
Preceded by Gen. John Shalikashvili	Supreme Allied Commander Europe; 1993—1997	Succeeded by Gen. Wesley Clark
