= William L. Nash =

United States Army general

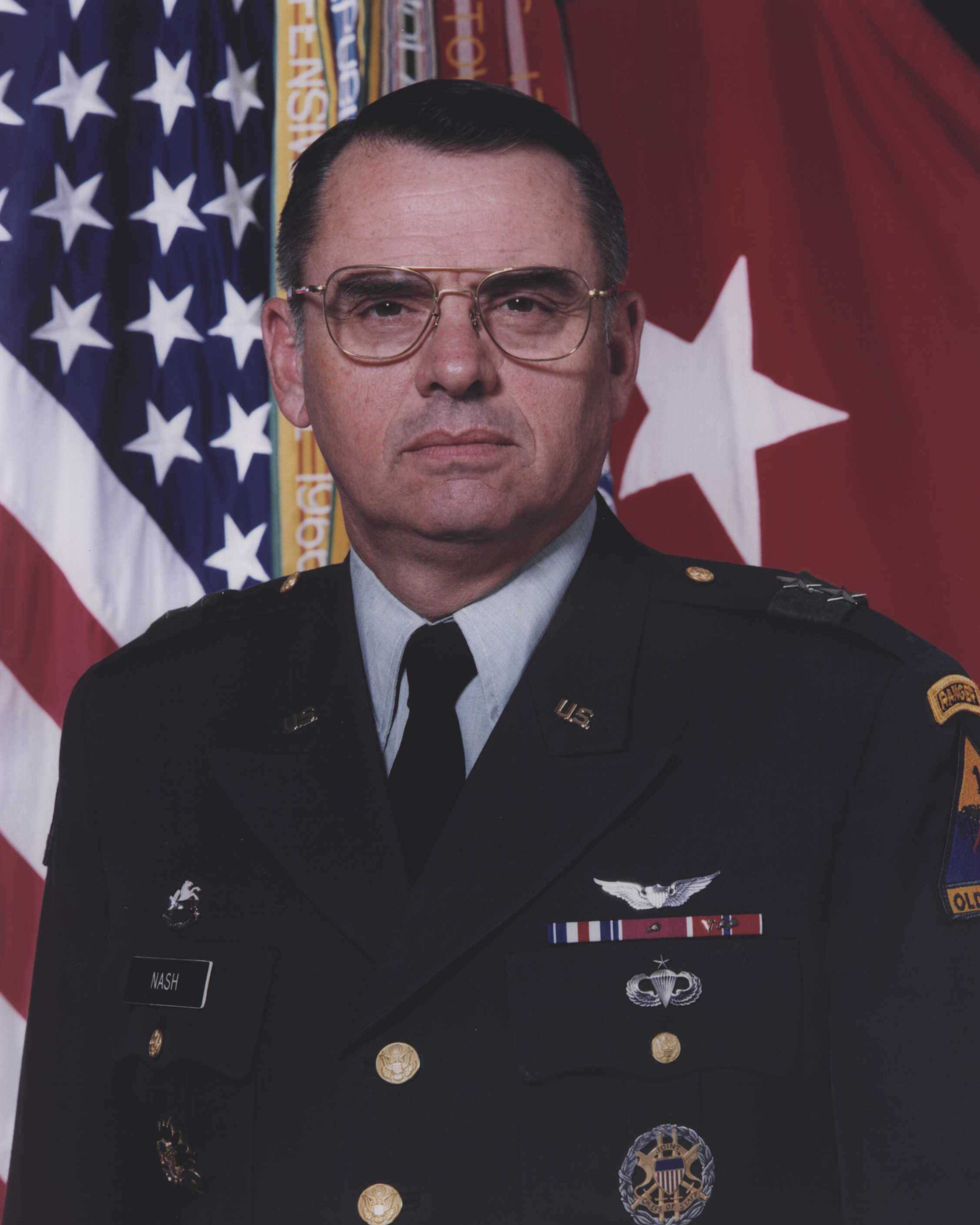
- Born: August 10; Tucson, Arizona, US
- Spouse: Elizabeth Becker
- Children: Rebecca J. Nash and William L. Nash III
- Military career
- Allegiance: United States
- Branch: United States Army
- Rank: Major General
- Nickname: Bill
- Conflicts: Vietnam War; Gulf War; Bosnian War
- Awards: Distinguished Service Medal; Silver Star; Legion of Merit (2); Bronze Star Medal (2)

William L. Nash is a retired major general in the U.S. Army who commanded the 1st Armored Division when it went to Bosnia in 1995 as the bulk of Multi-National Division (North) for a year as part of the Implementation Force (IFOR). A Russian brigade, initially under the command of Colonel Aleksandr Ivanovich Lentsov, was part of that effort. General Nash is a frequent contributor to ABCNEWS.

He stated in 2006 that he believes a civil war is taking place in Iraq.

He is a retired visiting lecturer in the Woodrow Wilson School of Public and International Affairs at Princeton University.
