= Alexander Lentsov =

Russian army officer (born 1956)

- Александр Иванович Ленцов
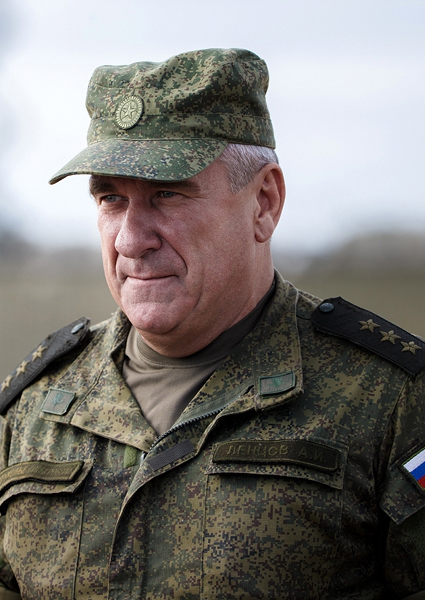
- Lentsov in 2015
- Born: Alexander Ivanovich Lentsov; 20 December 1956 (age 69); Kholmskaya, Russian SFSR, Soviet Union
- Military career
- Allegiance: USSR (to 1991); Russia
- Branch: Soviet Airborne Forces; Russian Airborne Forces; Russian Ground Forces
- Service years: 1978–2023
- Rank: Colonel general
- Conflicts: Soviet–Afghan War; First Chechen War; Bosnian War (IFOR); Second Chechen War; Russo-Georgian War; Russo-Ukrainian War; Second Nagorno-Karabakh War (peacekeeping); Syrian Civil War (expeditionary force)

Alexander Ivanovich Lentsov (Russian: Александр Иванович Ленцов; born 20 December 1956) is a retired Russian Airborne Forces colonel general that held various senior positions, including Deputy Commander of the Russian Airborne Forces from 2009 to 2013 and Deputy Commander-in-Chief of the Russian Ground Forces from 2013 to 2020. He also had senior posts with Russian peacekeeping forces deployed abroad in Bosnia and Herzegovina, Nagorno-Karabakh, and Syria, and commanded the 98th Guards Airborne Division from 1996 to 2009.

== Biography ==
Lentsov was born on 20 December 1956 in Kholmskaya, Krasnodar Krai, in the Soviet Union. His military education includes graduating from the Ryazan Guards Higher Airborne Command School in 1978, from the Frunze Military Academy in 1989, and from the General Staff Academy in 2008. After 1978 he first served in command positions at the platoon, battalion, regimental, and division levels, and fought in the Soviet-Afghan War and the Chechen Wars.

=== General officer ===
He was promoted to lieutenant general in 2011 and colonel general in 2014.

Since 2020 he has served as an advisor to the Minister of Defence.

On 25 April 2023, he was appointed commander of the Russian peacekeeping contingent in Nagorno-Karabakh. He remained in that role until 3 September 2023.

== Awards ==
- Order of Merit to the Fatherland, 4th class
- Order of Courage

Military offices
| Preceded by Position created | Commander of the 1st Separate Airborne Brigade; 1996 | Succeeded by Sergei Generalov |
| Preceded by Alexander Bespalov | Commander of the 98th Guards Airborne Division; 1996–2009 | Succeeded by Alexei Ragozin |
| Preceded by Yevgeny Ustinov | Deputy Commander of the Russian Airborne Forces; 2009–2013 | Succeeded by Andrei Kholzakov |
| Preceded by ?? | Deputy Commander-in-Chief of the Russian Ground Forces; 2013–2020 | Succeeded by Alexander Matovnikov |
| Preceded by Andrei Volkov | Commander of the Russian military contingent in Nagorno-Karabakh; 2023 | Succeeded by Kirill Kulakov |
