= Stabilisation Force in Bosnia and Herzegovina =

Former peacekeeping force of the NATO

Stabilisation Force
- The emblem of SFOR, which contains the Latin and Cyrillic scripts.
- Active: 20 December 1996 – 2 December 2004
- Disbanded: 2004 (succeeded by EUFOR Althea)
- Country: 39 countries
- Type: Command
- Role: Peacekeeping
- Part of: NATO
- Nickname: "SFOR"

The Stabilisation Force (SFOR) was a NATO-led multinational peacekeeping force deployed to Bosnia and Herzegovina after the Bosnian War. It was authorised by Security Council Resolution 1088 on 12 December 1996. Although SFOR was led by NATO, several non-NATO countries contributed troops. It was replaced by EUFOR Althea in December 2004.

== Mission ==
The stated mission of SFOR was to "deter hostilities and stabilise the peace, contribute to a secure environment by providing a continued military presence in the Area Of Responsibility (AOR), target and co-ordinate SFOR support to key areas including primary civil implementation organisations, and progress towards a lasting consolidation of peace, without further need for NATO-led forces in Bosnia and Herzegovina".

== Structure and history ==
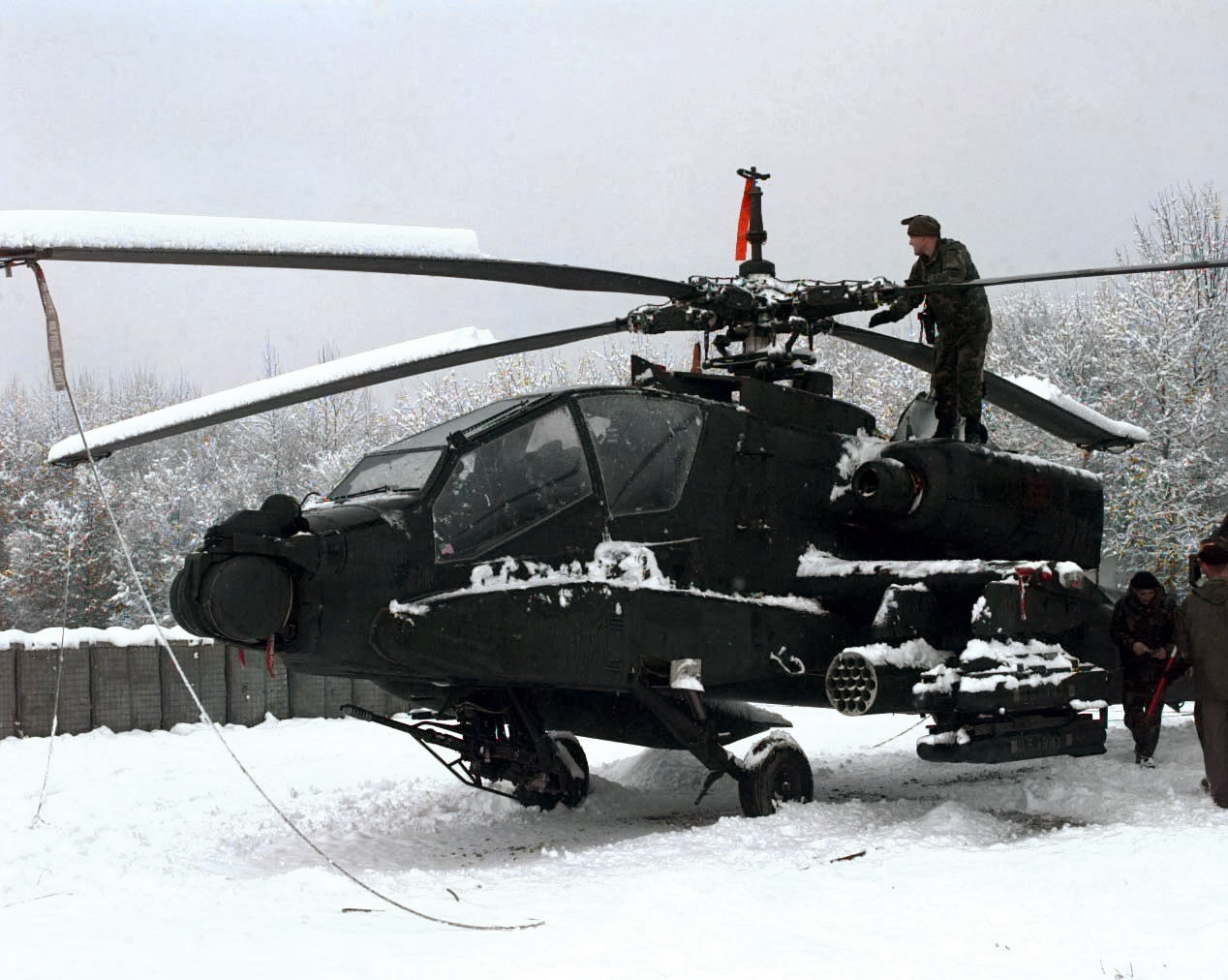
501st Aviation Brigade AH-64A on Operation Joint Guard in the Balkans, 1998

SFOR was established in Security Council Resolution 1088 on 12 December 1996. It succeeded the much larger Implementation Force (IFOR) which was deployed to Bosnia and Herzegovina on 20 December 1995 with a one-year mandate. The commanders of the SFOR, who each served one-year terms, were General William W. Crouch, General Eric Shinseki, General Montgomery Meigs, Lt. General Ronald Adams, Lt. General Michael Dodson, Lt. General John B. Sylvester, Lt. General William E. Ward, Major General Virgil Packett and Brigadier General Steven P. Schook.

The NATO designations for the overall Bosnia-Herzegovina operation were successively Operation Joint Guard and Operation Joint Forge.

SFOR was divided into three zones of operation:

- Mostar Multi-National Division (South East) – Italian, French, German, Spanish
- Banja Luka Multi-National Division (South West) and MND(W) – American, British, Canadian, Czech, Dutch. The British code name for their activities in IFOR was Operation Resolute and SFOR was Operation Lodestar (to June 1998) and Operation Palatine (from June 1998). The Canadian mission was named Operation Palladium (1996 to 2004).
- Tuzla MND(N) – American, Turkish, Polish, Russian, Norwegian, Swedish, Danish, Finnish.

(Some units had troops stationed outside the assigned zone)

The three AOs were known collectively as Multi-National Divisions until the end of 2002 where they were reduced in scope to Multi-National Brigades.

SFOR operated under peace enforcement, not peacekeeping, rules of engagement. For example, it was cleared, in 1997, to neutralise Serb radio-television facilities. During its mandate, SFOR arrested 29 individuals who were charged with war crimes. Those arrested were transferred to the International Criminal Tribunal for the former Yugoslavia in the Netherlands.

U.S. service members serving in SFOR were awarded the Armed Forces Expeditionary Medal and the NATO Medal.

As time progressed, the numbers of troops allotted to SFOR declined. Troop levels were reduced to approximately 12,000 by the close of 2002, and to approximately 7,000 by the close of 2004. During NATO's 2004 Istanbul Summit the end of the SFOR mission was announced.

It was replaced by the European Union's EUFOR Althea, on 2 December 2004 at NATO HQ, Camp Butmir, Sarajevo, B-H. It was succeeded by the EU's Operation Althea. Its functions were assumed by military units from the European Union organized as European Union Forces (EUFOR).

=== Air operations ===
Several sequential air operations supported the stabilization efforts.

- Operation Deny Flight (April 1993 – December 1996)
- Operation Decisive Edge (December 1995 – December 1996)
- Operation Decisive Guard (December 1996 – June 1998)
- Operation Deliberate Forge (June 1998 – September 2004)

== Member forces ==
SFOR participated in Operation Joint Guard (21 December 1996 – 19 June 1998) and Operation Joint Forge (20 June 1998 – 2 December 2004).

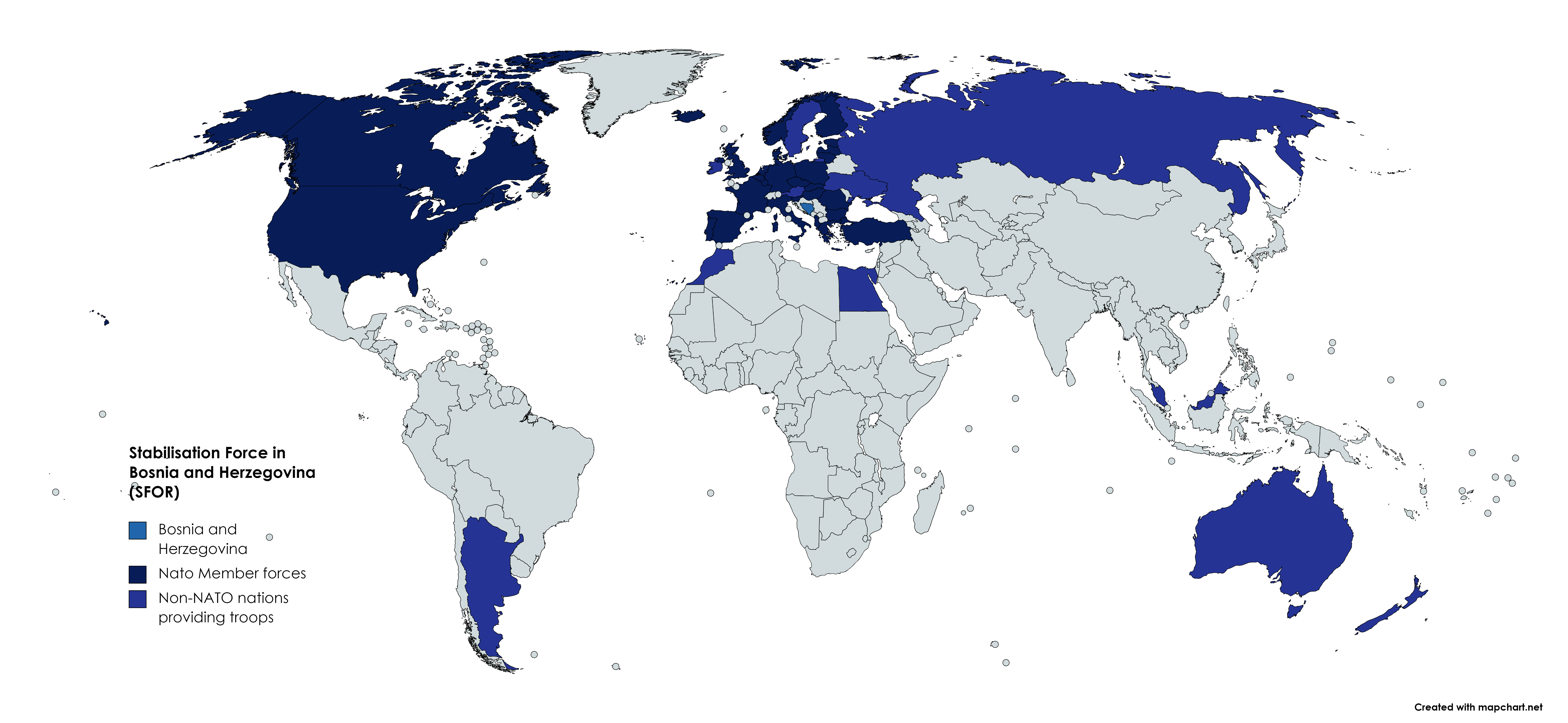
Stabilisation Force in Bosnia and Herzegovina SFOR Map

NATO nations providing troops included:

- Belgium
- Bulgaria
- Canada
- Czech Republic
- Denmark
- Estonia
- France
- Germany
- Greece
- Hungary
- Iceland
- Italy
- Latvia
- Lithuania
- Luxembourg
- Netherlands
- Norway
- Poland
- Portugal
- Romania
- Spain
- Slovakia
- Slovenia
- Turkey
- United Kingdom
- United States

Non-NATO nations providing troops included:

- Albania
- Argentina
- Australia
- Austria
- Egypt
- Finland
- Malaysia
- Morocco
- New Zealand
- Republic of Ireland
- Russia
- Sweden
- Ukraine

== See also ==
- National Support Group
