= Digital passport (Russia) =

Russian digital identity service

"Digital ID" mini-app in the Max app

Digital passport (Russian: Цифровой паспорт) is a government service in Russia that verifies the identity of a Russian citizen through the use of digital technologies. In official terms, the use of this digital passport service entails "the provision by citizens of the Russian Federation of information contained in documents that verify their identity".

An attempt to introduce a digital passport in the form of an identification card with an embedded chip by 2022 proved unsuccessful, largely due to public distrust of such a format. Beginning in 2023, a digital passport system was introduced that operates remotely, while still maintaining the traditional paper-based document. The initial proposal—which centered on an identification card—would have allowed a citizen to retain a paper document only by formally opting out of using the card.

As of September 2023, presenting a digital copy of a passport in certain specified situations is legally equivalent to presenting the original document. The approach adopted in Russia—which involves presenting a digital copy of a paper document—differs from the model used in several European countries, where a separate physical medium (an identification card containing an electronic chip) is issued. The fundamental distinction is that, in the European model, the identification card is mandatory, whereas the Russian digital passport serves as a supplement to the original paper document.

== Technical Implementation ==
The digital passport is presented via the Gosuslugi platform. This can be done through the standalone Gosuslugi mobile app or via the "Digital ID" mini-app integrated into the Max messaging platform. These applications are accessed using an account linked to a specific mobile phone SIM card; a digital passport can only be used if such an account exists.

There is also an intermediate option, used both in Russia and elsewhere: the biometric passport. This type of document retains a paper-based format but includes an additional chip that stores information about the holder.

== Identification Card ==
In 2013, a Universal electronic card was introduced across all regions of Russia, as mandated by the Federal Law "On the Organization of the Provision of State and Municipal Services." The card consisted of a physical medium displaying the user's personal information, along with an embedded chip containing data in electronic format. It was designed to serve two primary functions: as a form of identification and as a payment instrument. The long-term vision was for the card to evolve into an "electronic passport", eventually replacing traditional paper-based passports.

Beginning in 2015, pilot testing of electronic passports was conducted. At that time, the concept also included integrating the electronic ID card with payment functionality.

By 2018, plans were in place to launch electronic passports in 2024. To this end, the Russian Ministry of Economic Development and the autonomous non-profit organization "Digital Economy" began drafting legislation concerning electronic passports and the identification of citizens. A bill addressing citizen identification and the creation of a "digital profile" for individuals was submitted to the State Duma for consideration in July 2019.а

In 2019, it was decided to accelerate the rollout of the electronic passport, with plans for issuance to begin in Moscow in July 2020, followed by a nationwide rollout across the rest of Russia. It was anticipated that the issuance of traditional paper passports would cease as early as 2022. Existing paper passports would remain valid—either until their stated expiration date or, in the case of passports issued at age 45, for the remainder of the holder's life. A complete transition from paper-based passports to electronic ones was planned for 2023. The electronic passport was intended to take two forms: a plastic card and a software application installed on a smartphone. The plastic-card version was to feature the holder's photograph (potentially including a hologram) and a QR code; a prototype was unveiled on July 17, 2019, by Maxim Akimov, Deputy Prime Minister of Russia.

Furthermore, as part of the shift toward a digital economy, plans were made to digitize other documents—specifically driver's licenses (including a mobile app version), vehicle registration certificates and electronic vehicle title documents.

In the first half of 2019, Russia transitioned to an electronic version of the SNILS (individual insurance account number), discontinuing the issuance of paper copies. Additionally, steps were taken to link passports, pension certificates, and insurance documents to a single identification number within an electronic database.

The introduction of an electronic passport entails the creation of a unified electronic database for documents—potentially incorporating cloud-based storage and access, along with the resolution of security challenges. This includes the implementation of cryptographic protection for SIM cards in cases where software is used on mobile devices. The broader issues of cryptographic security and the issuance of secure, nationally produced SIM cards had been raised previously. To facilitate online access to personal information—notably through an electronic passport in the form of a mobile app—the state information system "Mir" has been under development since 2018. In early 2020, the Ministry of Industry and Trade of the Russian Federation allocated 165 million rubles for the implementation of SIM cards featuring encryption approved by the Federal Security Service (FSB).

In November 2020, Arkady Trachuk, head of Goznak, presented a potential model for an electronic passport. On November 27, 2020, the Ministry of Internal Affairs of Russia announced that the issuance of electronic passports would begin in Moscow by December 1, 2021. According to a draft presidential decree—created on March 19, 2021, and subsequently published—a passport containing an electronic storage medium, along with an electronic document generated via a mobile application, was slated for introduction in the Russian Federation starting December 1, 2021, with the technical infrastructure to support their use established nationwide. The plan stipulated that in Moscow, the option to obtain such a passport and to generate and activate the corresponding electronic document would be available from December 1, 2021; for other constituent entities and federal territories of the Russian Federation, this would be rolled out based on technical readiness, no later than July 1, 2023. In May 2021, the press center of the Russian Ministry of Internal Affairs confirmed that the issuance of these documents would commence no later than December 1, 2021, as part of a pilot project, with a nationwide rollout to follow no later than July 1, 2023. On September 29, 2021, the Ministry of Internal Affairs declared its readiness for the introduction of electronic passports in Russia.

On October 18, 2021, the Russian Minister of Digital Development, Maksut Shadayev, expressed hope that by the end of 2022, three constituent entities of the Russian Federation would begin issuing a new type of passport, available in two interconnected formats. A draft decree was submitted during the penultimate week of 2021. On January 2, 2022, Deputy Prime Minister Dmitry Chernyshenko announced that digital passports would begin to be issued in three pilot regions—Moscow, the Moscow Oblast and Tatarstan—starting in early 2023. The digital passport would consist of a contactless smart card (the primary form) and a smartphone application generating a QR code; the latter would serve as a substitute for a passport in specific, limited circumstances. At the holder's discretion, additional information—such as a Taxpayer Identification Number (INN), an individual insurance account number (SNILS), and a driver's license number—could also be included. While the transition from a paper passport to an electronic one is voluntary, the issuance of an electronic passport entails the surrender of the paper version. Furthermore, as of July 1, 2022, the procedures for issuing or replacing passports were updated: the processing time was reduced to 5 days (down from 10 or 30 days), and an expired passport remains valid for up to 90 days.

On June 16, 2022, at the St. Petersburg International Economic Forum, Maksut Shadaev announced that the project to issue electronic passports had been frozen indefinitely.

On October 27, 2023, the Migration Affairs Department of the Russian Interior Ministry stated that they lacked the technical capability to issue electronic passports.

== Remote Format ==
Confirming your age via the MAX app in a Pyatyorochka store

In 2017, a bill was considered in the State Duma regarding the linking of a passport to a SIM card.

From July 1, 2020, to December 31, 2021, an experiment was planned in Moscow involving the use of a Mobile Identifier application by citizens aged 18 and older. The application is linked to the Unified Identification and Authentication System and accessed via a citizen's profile on the Gosuslugi portal; it requires activation at a Multifunctional Center and data verification by the Ministry of Internal Affairs. As part of this, plans were made to equip MFCs with "crypto-booths" (specialized kiosks) to capture citizens' biometric data for entry into the Unified Biometric System, should such data not already be present. In this experimental format, the application could serve as a substitute for a physical passport when accessing 26 different services. In May–June 2020, the Ministry of Communications and Mass Media prepared a draft government decree to this effect. According to a survey of Moscow residents conducted by Superjob in May 2020, only about 22% were willing to participate in an experiment to replace paper passports with electronic identifiers—a view also shared by Metropolitan Hilarion (Alfeyev).

On February 15, 2023, at a meeting of the Government of Russia, Maksut Shadayev proposed the introduction of a digital identity document on smartphones, which could be verified via the Gosuslugi portal. President Vladimir Putin supported the proposal and requested that the process be expedited. The project was slated for approval by May 1, 2023. On April 13, 2023, the Ministry of Digital Development prepared a draft decree under which a digital version of a document on the Gosuslugi portal would be considered equivalent to its paper original.у

On September 18, 2023, a Decree of the President of Russia regarding an electronic passport was signed and issued; it stipulates that, in certain cases, information presented via the Gosuslugi mobile application may serve as a substitute for a physical paper passport. On October 6, 2023, the Ministry of Digital Development drafted a government resolution that would allow for the use of a digital passport by citizens who have records in the Unified Biometric System.
