= Natalya Melnikova =

- Наталья Мельникова
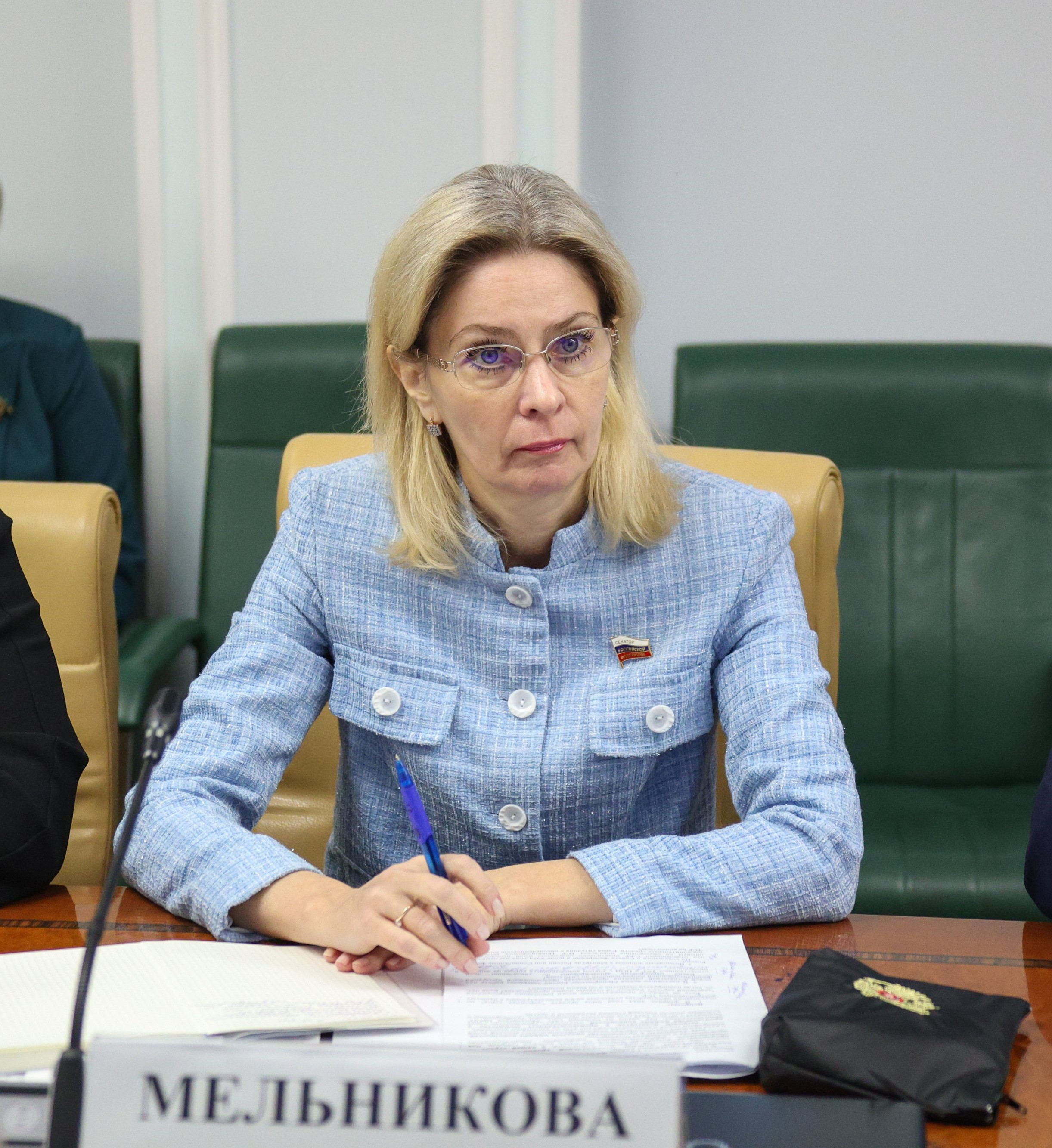

Senator from Pskov Oblast
- Incumbent
- Assumed office 24 September 2024
- Preceded by: Andrey Turchak

Personal details
- Born: 26 February 1976 (age 50) Pskov, Russia, Soviet Union
- Party: United Russia
- Education: Saint Petersburg State Technical University

Natalya Gennadyevna Melnikova (Russian: Наталья Геннадьевна Мельникова; born 26 February 1976 in Pskov) is a Russian politician. She has been a Senator of the Federation Council and a representative of the legislative branch of Pskov Oblast since 24 September 2024. She is a member of the Federation Council Committee on Social Policy.

== Biography ==
In 1999, she graduated from the Saint Petersburg State Technical University with a degree in mechanical engineering.

In 2003, she graduated from the Saint Petersburg State Technical University with a degree in accounting, analysis and audit.

Since 1999, she has worked at the Pension Fund of the Russian Federation. Specifically, she served as a leading specialist in the PFR's economic department.

Since 2014, she has headed the Pskov branch of the Pension Fund of Russia. As of 1 January 2023, the Pension Fund was merged with the Social Insurance Fund to form the Pension and Social Insurance Fund of Russia.

From 2023 to 2024, she served as manager of the Pskov Oblast branch of the Social Fund of Russia.

Since September 18, 2016, she has been a deputy of the Pskov Regional Assembly of Deputies of the sixth convocation, elected from a single-mandate constituency representing the Regional Branch of the United Russia political party. She was elected Deputy Chair of the Committee on Labor and Social Policy and Regional Coordinator of the party's "Older Generation" project.

From 9 to 11 September 2022, she was elected as a deputy of the Pskov City Duma of the seventh convocation from single-mandate constituency No. 5 (47.68%) representing the United Russia party.

She has been awarded the "Excellent Worker of the Pension Fund of the Russian Federation" badge and Certificates of Honour from the Ministry of Health and Social Development of the Russian Federation, the Pension Fund of the Russian Federation, the Governor of the Pskov Oblast, and the Pskov Regional Assembly of Deputies.

=== Federation Council ===
Since October 2024, she has been a Senator of the Russian Federation, representing the legislative body of the Pskov Region. She was granted powers on 15 October 2024 by the Pskov Regional Assembly of Deputies (the senator's seat became vacant after Andrei Turchak left the Federation Council to head the Altai Republic).
