= Customs Code of Russia =

Parliament of Russia
- Citation: 5221-1
- Territorial extent: Russia
- Enacted by: Parliament of Russia
- Signed by: President of Russia
- Signed: 18 June 1993
- Commenced: 21 June 1993
- Date of expiry: 1 July 2010
- Status: Repealed

The Russian Customs Code was the law that regulated customs for Russia until 2010. The new Customs Code of the Russian Federation was adopted on May 14, 2003, to substitute the one dated back to 1993. The need to adopt a new Code arose from the problem of the development of Russian economy and foreign trade. The new Customs Code of the Russian Federation is to increase the efficiency of custom authorities through simplifying customs formalities and procedures. Tariffs are regulated by the Russian Customs Tariff document which became eligible on April 1, 2000.

The Customs Code of the Russian Federation ceased to be in force on 1 October 2011. The Federal Customs Service announced that starting from 1 July 2010, the Customs Code of the EurAsEC Customs Union, the norms of which have direct effect, will enter into force on the territory of the Russian Federation. At the national level, the new law "On Customs Regulation" supplements the multilateral Customs Code of the EurAsEC Customs Union. For Russia and Kazakhstan, the Customs Code of the EurAsEC Customs Union entered into force on 1 July. In relations among the three countries (Russia, Belarus and Kazakhstan), the Customs Code of the EurAsEC Customs Union entered into force on 6 July 2010. The Treaty on the Customs Code of the Eurasian Economic Union dated 11 April 2017 entered into force on 1 January 2018. At the same time, the Treaty on the Customs Code of the EurAsEC Customs Union of 27 November 2009 ceased to be in force.

== History ==
By the Decree of the Presidium of the Supreme Soviet of the Soviet Union of May 5, 1964, the Customs Code of the USSR was approved, regulating the state monopoly of foreign trade and the procedure for carrying out foreign trade operations, the movement of goods across the border of the Soviet Union. The Customs Code of the USSR came into force on July 1, 1964.

In the late 1980s, with the beginning of the transition to a market economy, the Customs Code became outdated faster than the economic transformations that took place and less and less met the requirements of the new era. Since the introduction of individual amendments to the current code no longer covered the required transformations, in 1991 the Supreme Soviet of the USSR approved a new Customs Code of the USSR, containing norms oriented towards the development of a market economy.

This Code, in order to create conditions for a fundamental reorganization of federal relations, the formation of a market economy within the framework of a single economic space of the USSR and the growth of foreign economic activity of the republics, national-territorial entities, enterprises and organizations, establishes the principles of customs affairs in the USSR based on the unity of the customs territory, customs duties and customs charges. The Code is aimed at ensuring compliance by customs and other government agencies, as well as enterprises, organizations and citizens, with rights and obligations in the field of customs affairs.

— Preamble to the Customs Code of the USSR of 1991

However, by the end of that year, the Soviet Union ceased to exist, and formally the code regulated the legal relations of a state that no longer existed. At the same time, Russia's external market became open to all enterprises. Legislators were faced with the urgent need to develop new customs legislation that would correspond to the real state of affairs both in the foreign economic sphere and in domestic economic policy.

The first version of the Customs Code of Russia was submitted for signature to President Boris Yeltsin in May 1993. The norms of international agreements on customs issues were taken as a basis. However, the draft law was returned to the Supreme Soviet of Russia for revision. The repeated and already successful presentation of the new code took place a month later, in June 1993. The Customs Code of the Russian Federation was approved by the Supreme Soviet and signed by the President on June 18, 1993. It consisted of 15 sections, 64 chapters and 456 articles.

By the way, the Customs Code of 1993 was one of the first major legislative acts adopted in modern Russia. At that time, there was no Tax or Civil Code, Code of Administrative Offenses or even Constitution of the Russian Federation with the latter came into force only on December 25, 1993.

However, despite the fact that the new Customs Code was more in line with the requirements of an open foreign economic market, its provisions contributed to the creation of administrative barriers when moving goods across the border. Thus, the Code was not an act of exclusively direct action, as it contained over 80 reference norms. At the same time, the right of normative regulation in the customs sphere was vested in both the Government of Russia and the State Customs Committee. Unlike international practice, the release of goods was more of a permit-based rather than a notification-based process. Finally, the timeframes for customs control operations by customs authorities were practically not regulated. This led to the fact that customs legislation became non-transparent and oriented towards customs authorities, rather than participants in foreign economic activity.

In addition, over time, norms began to emerge that contradicted the new Russian legislation. For example, in 1998, the Constitutional Court of Russia recognized Article 266 of the Code as unconstitutional and repealed it, which allowed customs authorities to confiscate the property of those persons who failed to complete customs clearance procedures within the established timeframes, and in 2001, the second part of Article 247 was repealed for the same reason. The fact that the measures of responsibility for violations of customs legislation were listed in the Code itself did not correspond to the developing legislative practice, whereas in 2001 the consolidated Code of Administrative Offenses in the Russian Federation came into force.

In order to increase the transparency of customs legislation, work on a new version of the Customs Code of the Russian Federation began in the late 1990s, and in November 1999 the State Duma adopted the draft Federal Law "On Amendments and Supplements to the Customs Code of the Russian Federation" in the first reading. Subsequently, the draft law was revised over the course of three years and was adopted by the State Duma in its final version only in April 2003, and signed by the President of the Russian Federation on May 28 of the same year. The new Customs Code contained 6 sections, 42 chapters and 439 articles. According to experts, the new code significantly increased the efficiency of customs regulation in Russia.

== See also ==
- Federal Customs Service of Russia
