= 2026 Pskov Oblast legislative election =

Regional legislative election in Russia

- 18–20 September 2026

All 26 seats in the Legislative Assembly 14 seats needed for a majority
- Turnout: 52.84% ▲9.21 pp
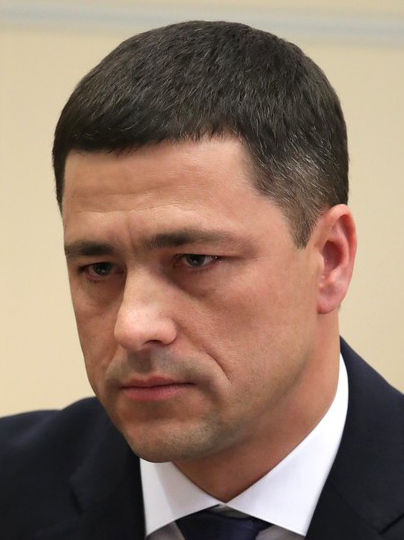

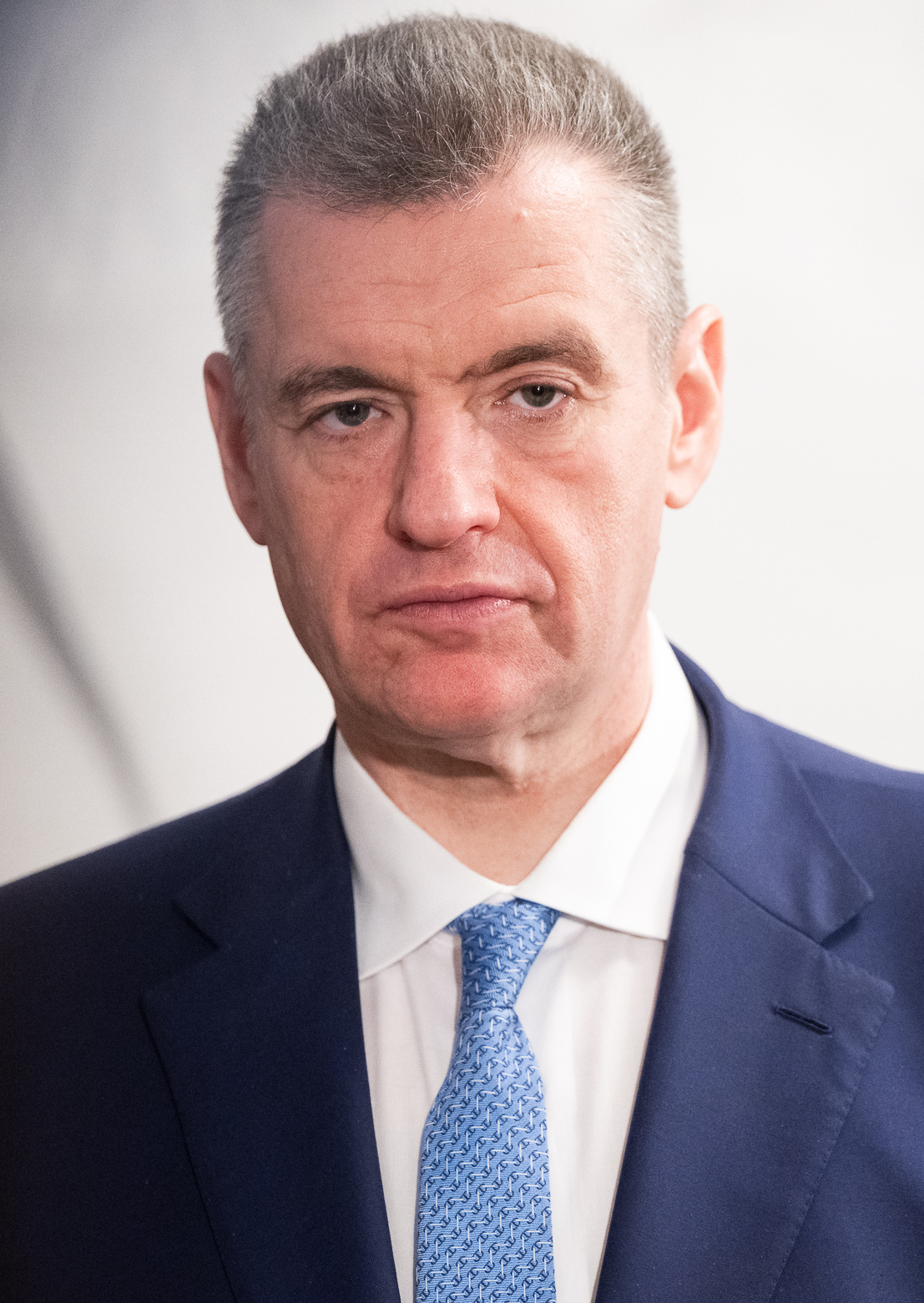

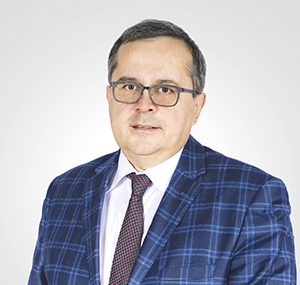
	Majority party	Minority party	Third party
Candidate	Mikhail Vedernikov	Pyotr Alekseyenko	Leonid Slutsky
Party	United Russia	CPRF	LDPR
Last election	39.61%, 19 seats	20.74%, 3 seats	8.90%, 1 seat
Seats won	21	2	1
Seat change	▲2	▼1	Steady
Popular vote	141,837	35,361	27,448
Percentage	53.69%	13.38%	10.49%
Swing	▲14.08 pp	▼7.36 pp	▲1.59 pp
	Fourth party	Fifth party	Sixth party
	NL
Candidate	Igor Romanov	Natalya Tudakova	Erik Prazdnikov
Party	New People	A Just Russia	Party of Pensioners
Last election	6.22%, 1 seat	9.09%, 1 seat	3.68%, 0 seats
Seats won	1	1	0
Seat change	Steady	Steady	Steady
Popular vote	22,200	16,070	9,822
Percentage	8.40%	6.08%	3.72%
Swing	▲2.18 pp	▼3.01 pp	▲0.04 pp
Chairman before election
Aleksandr Kotov
United Russia
Elected Chairman
Boris Yolkin
United Russia
Senator before election
Natalya Melnikova
United Russia
Senator after election
Natalya Melnikova
United Russia

The 2026 Legislative Assembly of Pskov Oblast election took place on 18–20 September 2026, on common election day, coinciding with the 2026 Russian legislative election. All 26 seats in the Legislative Assembly were up for re-election.

United Russia retained its majority in the Legislative Assembly, winning 53.7% of the vote and all 13 single-mandate constituencies. Communist Party of the Russian Federation lost third of its previous vote share and retained two seats. Liberal Democratic Party of Russia and New People increased their vote share but won a single deputy each. Yabloko list was disqualified, so it lost its faction after failing to win any single-member constituency.

== Electoral system ==
Under current election laws, the Legislative Assembly is elected for a term of five years, with parallel voting. 13 seats are elected by party-list proportional representation with a 5% electoral threshold, with the other half elected in 13 single-member constituencies by first-past-the-post voting. Seats in the proportional part are allocated using the Imperiali quota, modified to ensure that every party list, which passes the threshold, receives at least one mandate.

== Candidates ==
=== Party lists ===
To register regional lists of candidates, parties need to collect 0.5% of signatures of all registered voters in Pskov Oblast.

The following parties were relieved from the necessity to collect signatures:

- United Russia
- Communist Party of the Russian Federation
- Liberal Democratic Party of Russia
- A Just Russia
- New People
- Russian Party of Pensioners for Social Justice
- Yabloko
- Communists of Russia
- Rodina

№	Party	Oblast-wide list	Candidates	Territorial groups	Status
1	Party of Pensioners	Erik Pradznikov • Mikhail Ivanov • Sergey Goryachev	30	13	Registered
2	United Russia	Mikhail Vedernikov • Aleksandr Kotov • Alexey Naumets • Natalya Melnikova • Boris Yolkin	43	13	Registered
3	Liberal Democratic Party	Leonid Slutsky • Sergey Leonov • Anton Minakov	40	13	Registered
4	New People	Igor Romanov • Denis Pozdnyakov • Aleksandra Radion	41	13	Registered
5	A Just Russia	Natalya Tudakova • Aleksandr Nozhka • Andrey Davydov • Sergey Shishkov • Anastasia Grigoryeva	40	13	Registered
6	Rodina	Pavel Biktashev • Aleksandr Belov • Valery Koltakov	29	13	Registered
7	Communists of Russia	Sergey Malinkovich • Yekaterina Mironova • Ilya Aleksandrov • Stepan Krigan • Aleksandr Sakharov	42	13	Registered
8	Communist Party	Pyotr Alekseyenko • Stepan Belov • Dmitry Mikhaylov • Aleksandr Bayev	41	13	Registered
~~9~~	Yabloko	Aleksandr Konashenkov • Yana Ivanova • Yevgeny Vasilyev • Tatyana Pasman • Vera Rebrova	42	13	Disqualified

Yabloko was initially registered for the legislative election but was disqualified on August 25, 2026, by the Pskov Oblast Court for discrepancies in submitted documents.

=== Single-mandate constituencies ===
13 single-mandate constituencies were formed in Pskov Oblast. To register candidates in single-mandate constituencies need to collect 3% of signatures of registered voters in the constituency.

Number of candidates in single-mandate constituencies
Party	Candidates	
Party	Nominated	Registered
United Russia	13	13
Communist Party	13	13
A Just Russia	12	12
Liberal Democratic Party	13	12
New People	12	12
Yabloko	13	11
Party of Pensioners	12	12
Communists of Russia	1	1
Rodina	3	3
Total	92	89

== Results ==
=== Results by party lists ===
Summary of the 18–20 September 2026 Legislative Assembly of Pskov Oblast election results
Party	Party list					Constituency		Total	
Party	Votes	%	±pp	Seats	+/–	Seats	+/–	Seats	+/–
United Russia	141,837	53.69	▲14.08	8	▲2	13	Steady	21	▲2
Communist Party	35,361	13.38	▼7.36	2	▼1	0	Steady	2	▼1
Liberal Democratic Party	27,448	10.49	▲1.59	1	Steady	0	Steady	1	Steady
New People	22,200	8.40	▲2.18	1	Steady	0	Steady	1	Steady
A Just Russia	16,070	6.08	▼3.01	1	Steady	0	Steady	1	Steady
Party of Pensioners	9,822	3.72	▲0.04	0	Steady	0	Steady	0	Steady
Communists of Russia	3,956	1.50	▼0.49	0	Steady	0	New	0	Steady
Rodina	2,620	0.99	▼0.20	0	Steady	0	Steady	0	Steady
Yabloko	–	–	–	–	▼1	0	Steady	0	▼1
Invalid ballots	4,875	1.85	▼0.52	—	—	—	—	—	—
Total	264,189	100.00	—	13	Steady	13	Steady	26	Steady
Turnout	264,189	52.84	▲9.21	—	—	—	—	—	—
Registered voters	499,980	100.00	—	—	—	—	—	—	—

Pskov mayor Boris Yolkin (United Russia) was elected Chairman of the Legislative Assembly, replacing outgoing Chairman Aleksandr Kotov (United Russia). Incumbent Senator Natalya Melnikova (United Russia) was re-appointed to the Federation Council.

=== Results in single-member constituencies ===
==== District 1 ====
Summary of the 18–20 September 2026 Legislative Assembly of Pskov Oblast election in District 1
Candidate	Party	Votes	%
Aleksey Sevastyanov (incumbent)	United Russia	5,971	39.10%
Yury Konov	Communist Party	2,612	17.10%
Sergey Samokish	New People	1,933	12.66%
Natalya Tudakova	A Just Russia	1,862	12.19%
Vladimir Yefimov	Liberal Democratic Party	1,199	7.85%
Valentina Borisenkova	Party of Pensioners	1,110	7.27%
Valery Koltakov	Rodina	273	1.79%
Total		15,271	100%

==== District 2 ====
Summary of the 18–20 September 2026 Legislative Assembly of Pskov Oblast election in District 2
Candidate	Party	Votes	%
Yevgeny Vasilyev	United Russia	7,218	40.38%
Dmitry Mikhaylov	Communist Party	3,026	16.93%
Yevgeny Vasilyev	Yabloko	1,816	10.16%
Ivan Sverchkov	New People	1,675	9.37%
Svetlana Polyanskaya	Liberal Democratic Party	1,308	7.32%
Anastasia Grigoryeva	A Just Russia	1,045	5.85%
Olga Kruglova	Party of Pensioners	965	5.40%
Aleksandr Belov	Rodina	467	2.61%
Total		17,876	100%

==== District 3 ====
Summary of the 18–20 September 2026 Legislative Assembly of Pskov Oblast election in District 3
Candidate	Party	Votes	%
Yelena Sinyova	United Russia	7,812	48.02%
Yevgeny Sotnik	Communist Party	2,563	15.76%
Viktor Yashin	A Just Russia	1,659	10.20%
Aleksey Kanishchev	Yabloko	1,568	9.64%
Sergey Goryachev	Party of Pensioners	1,444	8.88%
Ramil Usmanov	Liberal Democratic Party	906	5.57%
Total		16,267	100%

==== District 4 ====
Summary of the 18–20 September 2026 Legislative Assembly of Pskov Oblast election in District 4
Candidate	Party	Votes	%
Yury Sorokin (incumbent)	United Russia	6,600	38.36%
Natalya Romanovskaya	Communist Party	2,718	15.80%
Yana Ivanova	Yabloko	1,945	11.30%
Igor Ivanov	A Just Russia	1,663	9.66%
Denis Pozdnyakov	New People	1,554	9.03%
Konstantin Sitkin	Liberal Democratic Party	1,551	9.01%
Yelena Soittu	Party of Pensioners	819	4.76%
Total		17,207	100%

==== District 5 ====
Summary of the 18–20 September 2026 Legislative Assembly of Pskov Oblast election in District 5
Candidate	Party	Votes	%
Dmitry Belyukov	United Russia	11,038	60.90%
Nikolay Chuvaylov	Communist Party	1,914	10.56%
Nadezhda Grigoryeva	Yabloko	1,201	6.63%
Kirill Zakharov	Liberal Democratic Party	1,083	5.98%
Aleksandr Mikhalenkov	New People	1,002	5.53%
Sergey Shishkov	A Just Russia	880	4.86%
Sergey Dubinin	Party of Pensioners	699	3.86%
Total		18,124	100%

==== District 6 ====
Summary of the 18–20 September 2026 Legislative Assembly of Pskov Oblast election in District 6
Candidate	Party	Votes	%
Yulia Yaryshkina	United Russia	10,375	59.67%
Sergey Matveyev	Communist Party	1,652	9.50%
Lyubov Lugasheva	New People	1,050	6.04%
Yury Pavlinov	Liberal Democratic Party	1,036	5.96%
Nikolay Chebotar	Communists of Russia	1,026	5.90%
Konstantin Nekrasov	Yabloko	860	4.95%
Yevgeny Smirnov	A Just Russia	748	4.30%
Zakir Rakhmanov	Party of Pensioners	384	2.21%
Total		17,387	100%

==== District 7 ====
Summary of the 18–20 September 2026 Legislative Assembly of Pskov Oblast election in District 7
Candidate	Party	Votes	%
Andrey Klyuchko	United Russia	12,703	50.00%
Aleksandr Konashenkov	Yabloko	2,431	9.57%
Ivan Gorislavsky	Communist Party	2,355	9.27%
Igor Romanov	New People	2,051	8.07%
Artyom Vasilyev	Liberal Democratic Party	1,874	7.38%
Aleksandr Nozhka	A Just Russia	1,612	6.34%
Darya Kuchugurina	Party of Pensioners	1,208	4.75%
Pavel Biktashev	Rodina	669	2.63%
Total		25,408	100%

==== District 8 ====
Summary of the 18–20 September 2026 Legislative Assembly of Pskov Oblast election in District 8
Candidate	Party	Votes	%
Dmitry Meltzer	United Russia	10,339	49.70%
Sergey Alekseyev	A Just Russia	2,978	14.32%
Sergey Petrov	Communist Party	2,145	10.31%
Aleksey Golubev	Liberal Democratic Party	1,719	8.26%
Semyon Barkov	New People	1,312	6.31%
Irina Ilyina	Party of Pensioners	1,119	5.38%
Vera Rebrova	Yabloko	796	3.83%
Total		20,802	100%

==== District 9 ====
Summary of the 18–20 September 2026 Legislative Assembly of Pskov Oblast election in District 9
Candidate	Party	Votes	%
Mikhail Karatysh	United Russia	9,521	53.19%
Boris Prilipkin	Communist Party	2,082	11.63%
Sergey Fyodorov	New People	1,399	7.82%
Vyacheslav Koyev	Party of Pensioners	1,374	7.68%
Ivan Peretyatko	Liberal Democratic Party	1,324	7.40%
Dmitry Shemetov	Yabloko	1,031	5.76%
Yury Fyodorov	A Just Russia	706	3.94%
Total		17,899	100%

==== District 10 ====
Summary of the 18–20 September 2026 Legislative Assembly of Pskov Oblast election in District 10
Candidate	Party	Votes	%
Nadezhda Vasilyeva	United Russia	9,571	50.27%
Pyotr Alekseyenko	Communist Party	2,979	15.65%
Lyudmila Marinova	Liberal Democratic Party	1,921	10.09%
Aleksandra Radion	New People	1,484	7.79%
Stanislav Tatarinovich	A Just Russia	1,441	7.57%
Marianna Svistunova	Party of Pensioners	1,271	6.68%
Total		19,040	100%

==== District 11 ====
Summary of the 18–20 September 2026 Legislative Assembly of Pskov Oblast election in District 11
Candidate	Party	Votes	%
Igor Dietrich (incumbent)	United Russia	12,189	54.93%
Yekaterina Sorokina	Communist Party	3,448	15.54%
Nikolay Salov	Liberal Democratic Party	2,001	9.02%
Natalya Krasikova	New People	1,610	7.26%
Igor Ivanov	Party of Pensioners	1,581	7.13%
Roman Lavrentyev	Yabloko	720	3.24%
Total		22,189	100%

==== District 12 ====
Summary of the 18–20 September 2026 Legislative Assembly of Pskov Oblast election in District 12
Candidate	Party	Votes	%
Andrey Kozlov (incumbent)	United Russia	11,972	55.77%
Olga Odintsova	Communist Party	2,726	12.70%
Vasily Rusakov	Liberal Democratic Party	1,895	8.83%
Tatyana Petrova	A Just Russia	1,590	7.41%
Aleksandr Kazitsky	Party of Pensioners	1,087	5.06%
Valeria Terenina	New People	1,082	5.04%
Pavel Semerikov	Yabloko	716	3.34%
Total		21,468	100%

==== District 13 ====
Summary of the 18–20 September 2026 Legislative Assembly of Pskov Oblast election in District 13
Candidate	Party	Votes	%
Darya Kozyakova	United Russia	13,124	58.71%
Aleksandr Bayev	Communist Party	3,937	17.61%
Viktoria Ogirok	A Just Russia	2,584	11.56%
Aleksey Lavov	New People	2,096	9.38%
Total		22,355	100%

=== Members ===
Incumbent deputies are highlighted with bold, elected members who declined to take a seat are marked with ~~strikethrough~~.

Constituency
No.	Member	Party
1	Aleksey Sevastyanov	United Russia
2	Yevgeny Vasilyev	United Russia
3	Yelena Sinyova	United Russia
4	Yury Sorokin	United Russia
5	Dmitry Belyukov	United Russia
6	Yulia Yaryshkina	United Russia
7	Andrey Klyuchko	United Russia
8	Dmitry Meltzer	United Russia
9	Mikhail Karatysh	United Russia
10	Nadezhda Vasilyeva	United Russia
11	Igor Dietrich	United Russia
12	Andrey Kozlov	United Russia
13	Darya Kozyakova	United Russia

Party lists
Member	Party
~~Mikhail Vedernikov~~	United Russia
~~Aleksandr Kotov~~	United Russia
~~Alexey Naumets~~	United Russia
Natalya Melnikova	United Russia
Boris Yolkin	United Russia
Tatyana Fomchenkova	United Russia
Yevgeny Shumaylov	United Russia
Pavel Gomon	United Russia
~~Anton Moroz~~	United Russia
Oleg Savelyev	United Russia
~~Marina Bystrova~~	United Russia
~~Nikolay Romanov~~	United Russia
~~Oleg Shipilin~~	United Russia
Oksana Lazareva	United Russia
~~Margarita Shalygina~~	United Russia
~~Olga Galakhova~~	United Russia
~~Yekaterina Anisimova~~	United Russia
Dmitry Bystrov	United Russia
Pyotr Alekseyenko	Communist Party
~~Stepan Belov~~	Communist Party
Dmitry Mikhaylov	Communist Party
~~Leonid Slutsky~~	Liberal Democratic Party
~~Sergey Leonov~~	Liberal Democratic Party
Anton Minakov	Liberal Democratic Party
Igor Romanov	New People
Natalya Tudakova	A Just Russia

== See also ==
- 2026 Russian regional elections
