= Consulate General of the United States, Yekaterinburg =

Consulate General of the United States in Yekaterinburg
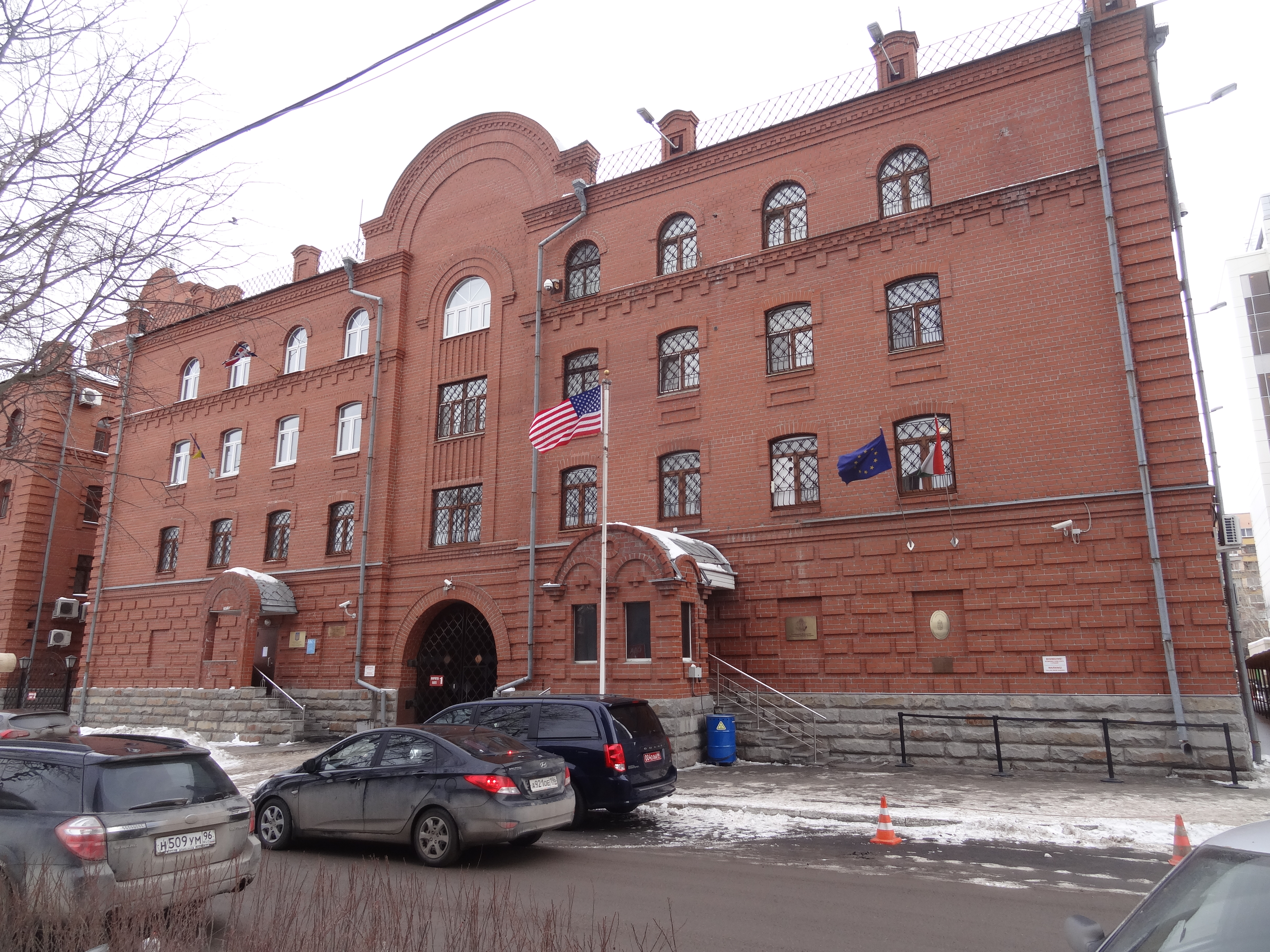
- Location: Yekaterinburg, Russia
- Address: 15 Gogol Street, Leninsky District
- Coordinates: 56°50′00″N 60°36′36″E
- Opened: 1994
- Closed: 2021
- Website: https://ru.usembassy.gov/embassy-consulates/yekaterinburg/

The Consulate General of the United States in Yekaterinburg (Russian: Генеральное консульство США в Екатеринбурге) is a diplomatic mission of the United States in Yekaterinburg, providing consular services to Russian and American citizens in the Ural region of Russia and Western Siberia.

== History ==
During the times of the USSR, due to the concentration of industries related to defense, most of the Ural region was closed to foreigners for decades during the Cold War, limiting the contact of the Siberian population with Western ideas. In 1992, the Russian Federation opened this region to foreigners and foreign investments, and the United States was at the forefront of Western efforts to establish contacts there. In 1994, the U.S. Secretary of Commerce Ron Brown opened the U.S. Consulate General in Yekaterinburg, becoming the first diplomatic mission in central Russia after World War II. This was followed by other nations establishing their diplomatic missions in Yekaterinburg, such as Hungary, which opened a permanent trade representation in 1996, and the United Kingdom, which opened a consulate in 1997. The first U.S. Consul General in Yekaterinburg was Jack Segal.

In March 2020, the consulate limited visa issuance due to the COVID-19 pandemic for an indefinite period. In December 2020, the U.S. State Department decided to suspend the operations of the consulate in Yekaterinburg, citing security and organizational issues. In February 2021, it was reported that the consulate began accepting applications for the reissuance of American visas. On April 1, 2021, it was announced that the provision of visa and consular services by the Yekaterinburg consulate was suspended, and the consular district of the U.S. Embassy in Moscow was expanded to cover the entire territory of Russia. After the approval of the Unfriendly countries list in mid-May 2021, the U.S. consulate in Yekaterinburg reduced its staff, and Consul Amy Storrow left her post.

== Consuls General ==
Term	Consul	Note
1994—1995	Jack Segal	
1999—2001	James Bigus	
2005—2008	John Stepanchuk	
2008—2010	Tim Sandusky	
2010—2013	Mike Reinert	
2013	Andrew Wiener^{acting}	
2013—2015	Otto Hans Van Merssen	
2015—2017	Marcus Micheli	
2017—2019	Paul M. Carter Jr.	
2019—2021	Emily Storrow	

== See also ==
- List of diplomatic missions of the United States
- List of diplomatic missions in Russia
- Russia–United States relations
