= SNILS (Russia) =

Person identifier in Russia

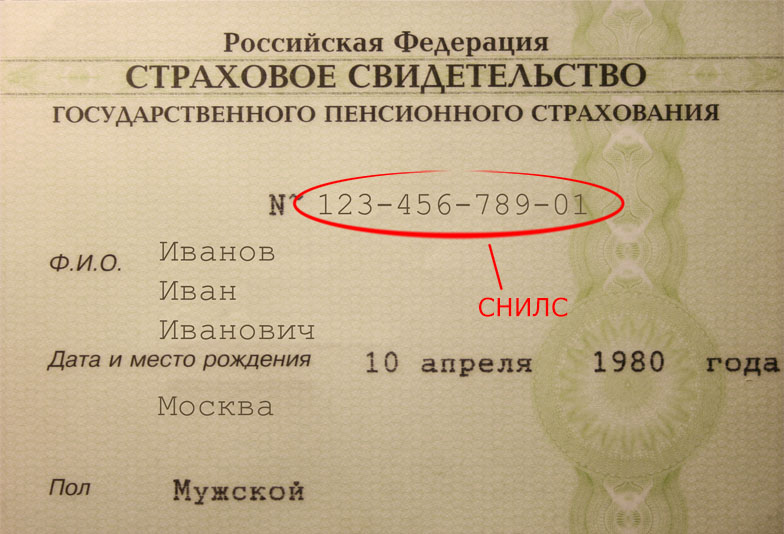
Example SNILS card with account number highlighted. These cards are no longer issued since 4 April 2019.

Individual insurance account number (SNILS) is a number issued and used by the Pension and Social Insurance Fund of the Russian Federation to residents of Russia for the purpose of tracking their social security accounts. SNILS is required for the Pension Fund of the Russian Federation to organize personal information about an employee and the amounts contributed by an employer to an employee's individual retirement account in respect of a future pension. SNILS is used universally as a primary personal number within the Government of Russia. Anyone residing in Russia on a permanent basis may apply for a number and an application can also be filed on behalf of a child at birth.

SNILS format is "123-456-789 12" where the first 9 characters can be any digits and the final two are a checksum. The number is unique to each person. An individual's personal account contains all the data on insurance contributions accrued and paid by employers throughout a person's active employment. This is subsequently taken into consideration when pension benefits are first determined or adjusted. An insurance number is assigned automatically to simplify and expedite the process for determining an insurance retirement benefit.

The number used to be issued on a green plastic card, but since 4 April 2019 cards issuance was suspended and nowadays it is issued in electronic form only, while cards issued before this date are still valid. Anyone looking to get legal employment in Russia or to apply for welfare must have one.

== See also ==
- Taxpayer Identification Number
