= Civil Code of Russia =

Prime source of civil law for Russia

Parliament of Russia
- Territorial extent: Russia
- Enacted by: Parliament of Russia
- Signed by: President of Russia
- Signed: 1994
- Commenced: 1 January 1995
- Status: In force

The Civil Code of the Russian Federation (Russian: Гражданский кодекс Российской Федерации, frequently abbreviated 'ГК РФ') is the prime source of civil law for the Russian Federation. The Russian Civil Law system descended from Roman Law through Byzantine tradition. It was heavily influenced by German and Dutch norms in the 18th and 19th centuries. Socialist-style modifications took place during the Soviet period (1922–1991) and Continental European Law influences since the 1990s.

The Civil Code of the Russian Federation came into force in four parts. The first part, which deals with general provisions (i.e. defines sources, names legal entities etc.) was enacted by the State Duma in 1994 and entered into force in 1995. The second part (dealing with the Law of obligations) entered into force in 1996. The third part (Succession law) entered into force in 2002. The document has certain basic principles: equality of all participants guaranteed by civil law, inviolability of private property, freedom of contract, free exercise of civil rights and juridical protection of civil rights.

The fourth part, dealing with intellectual property, was signed into law on December 18, 2006 and came into force on January 1, 2008. Part IV became the first truly complete codification of the legislation on intellectual property in the world.

== The structure of the Civil Code ==
- Part 1
  - Section I: General provisions
  - Section II: Ownership and other proprietary interests
  - Section III: The general part of the law of obligations
- Part 2
  - Section IV: Specific types of obligations
- Part 3
  - Section V: Succession law
  - Section VI: International private law
- Part 4
  - Section VII: The right to products of intellectual activity and means of individualization

Unlike most European civil codes, Russia's Civil Code does not cover family law. Instead, family law is dealt with in a separate code.

== History ==
Since its foundation as an independent successor state of the former Soviet Union, the Russian Federation had been engaged in a large legislative project of developing a new Civil Code. In July 1994, President Boris Yeltsin signed a decree authorizing the "Establishment and Development of Private Law in Russia" program. The drafts of all four parts of the Civil Code of the Russian Federation were prepared by the S. S. Alekseev Research Center for Private Law under the President of the Russian Federation. All of them subsequently became laws. The working group on the preparation of the first (general) part included G. D. Golubov, A. L. Makovsky, O. M. Kozyr, S. A. Khokhlov, V. V. Vitryansky, V. A. Dozortsev, M. I. Braginsky, E. A. Sukhanov, G. E. Avilov. It took significant effort to get first part of the Code approved by the State Duma — while the Federation Council voted against the Code. However, the Federation Council took longer than allowed by the Constitution to come to its decision. This allowed Yeltsin to sign the Code into law. In other words, as Sergei Alexeyev put it, the Civil Code became law almost "by accident".

== See also ==
- Law of the Russian Federation
- Criminal Code of Russia
- Offences Code of Russia
- Family Code of Russia
- Customs Code of Russia
