= INSOR =

Russian think tank

INSOR (abbreviated Russian: Институт современного развития, Institute of Contemporary Development), known until March 2008 as RIO Center (Russian: РИО-Центр, Center for Development of an Information Society), in a Moscow-based nonprofit think tank affiliated with former Prime Minister of Russia, Dmitry Medvedev, who, as of July 31, 2008, heads INSOR's board of trustees. It is the only non-government organization where Medvedev retained formal influence after the presidential election. Daily management of INSOR is delegated to Igor Yurgens, vice-president and spokesman of Russian Union of Industrialists and Entrepreneurs.

== History ==
RIO Center, established in 2003, initially focused on the ways of modernizing Russia into an information society, moving into National Priority Projects area when these projects emerged in 2005. INSOR was officially launched by Medvedev March 18, 2008 – after the election but prior to his inauguration. The organization declares a long-term goal of modernizing national social services within the framework of four National Priority Projects: Modern Healthcare, Affordable Housing, Quality Education and Agricultural Development - as well as the Demographic Sustainability program. Medvedev declared that "civil society should have means to influence the implementation of social policy. And expert discussions of this kind are one of the forms of such influence". Yurgens described the organization "as an open center, where various points of view may collide, but, on the other hand, part of the discussion may be held behind closed doors, yet the final recommendations will always be available to the public".

In July 2008 INSOR made headlines by promoting an unpopular decision to replace regressive rate of employers' social contributions (unified social tax) with a flat 26% tax. The proposal does not affect employers of low-income workforce but targets employers of highly skilled workers, professional firms etc. The change is part of a larger plan to reform Russian social contribution system. Currently, employer contributions are channeled into Pension Fund, mandatory medical insurance and social insurance, none of which can function properly. INSOR proposes to eliminate mandatory insurance altogether and use the savings to finance the deficit-ridden Pension Fund. These proposals are radically contrary to Vladimir Putin's government approach.

Earlier in 2008 INSOR launched an internet portal for the youth, mir4you.ru. It was criticized for a formal approach, lack of own exclusive content, massive copyright violation and numerous factual errors due to unscrupulous use of outdated "borrowed" texts.

== Personnel ==
INSOR's board of 12 includes, along with Medvedev, state servants (Arkady Dvorkovich, Elvira Nabiullina, etc.) and academics (Yevgeny Velikhov, Yevgeny Yasin). There are no active businesspeople (with a probable exception of Leonid Reiman). Executive staff is primarily academic (Ruslan Grinberg, Vladimir Mau etc.)

== See also ==
- Independent Institute for Social Policy (IISP)
- Institute for US and Canadian Studies (ISKRAN)
- Institute of World Economy and International Relations (IMEMO)
