= Borders of Russia =

Political boundaries between Russia and neighboring territories

Modern borders of the Russian Federation, including occupied and claimed territories.

Typical border marker of Russia

Russia, the largest country in the world by area, has international land borders with fourteen sovereign states as well as two narrow maritime boundaries with the United States and Japan. There are also two breakaway states bordering Russia, namely Abkhazia and South Ossetia. The country has an internationally recognized land border running 22,407 kilometres (13,923 mi) in total, and has the second-longest land border of any country in the world, after China (22,457 kilometres (13,954 mi)).

The borders of the Russian Federation (formerly the Russian SFSR) were mostly drawn since 1956 (save for minor border changes, e.g., with China), and have remained the same after the dissolution of the Soviet Union. In 2014, Russia annexed Ukraine's Crimean peninsula in a move that remains internationally unrecognized which altered de facto borders with Ukraine. In 2022, Russia further annexed Donetsk, Kherson, Luhansk and Zaporizhzhia oblasts further changing de facto borders with Ukraine.

== Overview ==
Approximately from west to east:

Country or territory	Land border (km)	Maritime border (km)	Length of total border (km)	More information
Baltic Sea	0.0	126.1	126.1	
Norway	195.8	23.3	219.1	Norway–Russia border
Finland	1271.8	54.0	1325.8	Finland–Russia border
Estonia	138.0	322.0	460	Estonia–Russia border
Latvia	270.5	0.0	270.5	Latvia–Russia border
Lithuania	266.0	22.4	288.4	Lithuania–Russia border
Poland	204.1	32.2	236.3	Poland–Russia border
Belarus	1239.0	0.0	1239.0	Belarus–Russia border
Ukraine (de facto until 2014)	1925.8	320	2245.8	Russia–Ukraine border
Black Sea	0.0	389.5	389.5	
Abkhazia (de facto since 2008)	255.4	0.0	255.4	Abkhazia–Russia border
Georgia (de facto since 2008)	572.5	22.4	594.9	Georgia–Russia border
South Ossetia (de facto since 2008)	70.0	0.0	70.0	Russia–South Ossetia border
Azerbaijan	327.6	22.4	350.0	Azerbaijan–Russia border
Caspian Sea	0.0	580.0	580.0	
Kazakhstan	7512.8	85.8	7598.6	Kazakhstan–Russia border
China	4209.3	0.0	4209.3	China–Russia border
Mongolia	3485.0	0.0	3485.0	Mongolia–Russia border
North Korea	17.0	22.1	39.1	North Korea–Russia border
Pacific Ocean	0.0	16997.9	16997.9	
Japan	0.0	194.3	194.3	Japan–Russia border
United States	0.0	49.0	49.0	USSR–USA Maritime Boundary Agreement
Arctic Ocean	0.0	19724.1	19724.1	

== See also ==
- Border Security Zone of Russia
- Customs Code of Russia
- Territorial disputes of the Russian Federation
- Territorial evolution of Russia
