= Pension Fund of the Russian Federation =

Principal national pension fund of Russia

- Пенсионный фонд Российской Федерации (ПФР)
- Logo of the Pension Fund of the Russian Federation

Federal service overview
- Formed: December 22, 1990
- Dissolved: 1 January 2023
- Superseding Federal service: Pension and Social Insurance Fund of the Russian Federation
- Headquarters: Shabolovka ulitsa, dom 4, Moscow, Russia
- Federal service executive: Sergey Chirkov
- Website: Pfrf.gov.ru

The Pension Fund of the Russian Federation (PFR) (Russian: Пенсионный фонд Российской Федерации (ПФР)) was the principal national pension fund in Russia before its merge with the Social Security Fund. It was the largest organization in Russia to provide socially important public services to Russian citizens. Founded on December 22, 1990, a decision of the Supreme Soviet of the RSFSR No. 442-1 "On the organization of the Pension Fund of the Russian Federation". The fund has branches across all Federal Subjects of Russia. The labor collective FIU - is more than 133 thousand social workers.

The State Duma decided (July 5, 2022) to fuse this fund with the Social Insurance Fund of the Russian Federation and to create a united social fund under the title Pension and Social Insurance Fund of the Russian Federation since January 1, 2023.

== History ==
The Russian Pension Fund experienced three major changes from the Soviet system to the modern one throughout the 1990s and early 2000s. The first being a switch from the pension entirely controlled by the Soviet budget. This initial switch created the pension fund separate from the state budget in 1990. While supported by the Russian government as a switch from the almost collapsed USSR, the system had very few holds against its authority. Throughout the 1990s, allegations of abuse of power and racketeering were held against the fund, with the State Duma often refusing to address the broad institutional issues with the fund. The primary issues being viewed as the lack of centralization, and the lack of structured guidelines for how pensions were to be paid out. As the 1998 Russian financial crisis began, the fund began to be hit by budgetary shortfalls. Following the resignation of President Boris Yeltsin, changes began to be viewed as necessary and a new system was fully approved in 2001. This system included a set pension for elderly and disabled, a set savings account based on what is actually paid into the system, and a pay as you go contribution fund. Due in part to low retirement ages in Russia, official retirement set at 55 for women 60 for men, multiple organizations called for a reform once more of a pension system deemed unsound. These calls would couple with the Great Recession in Russia, leading to another round of reforms in 2010. These reforms would combine the set pension for elderly and disabled with the pay-as-you-go system, simplifying the overall fund. As Russia's working population stabilized after years of decline, the fund too could begin to stabilize. From 2019, a gradual hike of the retirement ages was started (the new level of 60/65 for women/men should be attained in 2028).

== Functions ==
Among the socially significant functions of the Pension Fund of Russia:

- Appointment and payment of pensions (for 40 million pensioners);
- Accounting insurance funds received for mandatory pension insurance;
- The purpose and implementation of social payments to certain categories of citizens: veterans, the disabled, people with disabilities due to war injuries, Heroes of the Soviet Union, Heroes of the Russian Federation, etc.;
- The personified accounting of participants of the system of a mandatory pension of insurance;
- The interaction of with policy-holders (by employers - the payers of insurance of pension contributions), the penalty of back taxes;
- The issuance of certificates for a parent capital;
- The payment of the maternity capital;
- Management of the funds of the pension system;
- Implementation of the program of state co-financing of voluntary pension savings (56-FZ of 30.04.2008, it is also the program "thousands upon thousands");
- Since 2010 - the administration of insurance funds received for mandatory pension insurance and the Federal Compulsory Health Insurance;
- Since 2010 - the establishment of a federal social payments to social pensions, in order to bring the total income of the pensioner to the subsistence minimum for pensioners

== Payment system and funding ==
The Pension Fund of the Russian Federation is funded by a mix of state and private employers, through cash transfers into the overall fund from the Russian Central Bank, and payments by individual citizens. The individual payments are placed in individual accounts which are then reinvested into the market either by the choice of the citizen, or if no choice is specified, the government itself. This system had numerous issues throughout the 2000s, as a low retirement age along with inability to properly invest funds, led to deficits in the pension budget. Under President Vladimir Putin's first and second term in office, maintenance of the pensions and regular payouts became a priority. This push led to multiple programs designed to encourage private savings for citizens, and for employer based pensions separate from the government's budget. With efforts by the Russian government, basic pensions became near universal for Russian citizens. Heavy transfers from the Russian budget to the Russian Pension Fund, along with steady payroll contributions from the newer working class stabilized much of the pension's throughout the 2000s, until further reforms were needed to address demographics issues. The payment system of the Russian Pension Fund however, is viewed as instable in the long run at the given standard, with a raise in the retirement age being cited as the easiest and most prevalent issue to solve. Pushes towards privatization in the 1990s, along with the encouragement of private accounts, became the government strategy in handling the pension system. However, the newer Russian economy was still heavily dependent on state involvement, and private involvement remains inefficient at curtailing budgetary crises. Despite the burden the low retirement age causes, reformation of the pension system and raising of the age remains inherently controversial in Russia. Fear of losing pensions, or of longer careers than intended, fuel popular resentment of politicians aiming to change the system. As pension reform and saving the pension remains controversial, it is unlikely that dramatic change would occur out of fear of upsetting the voting base.

Russia's pension system is paid either through employers, who take 22% of the payroll to accommodate for costs of pensions, by individuals themselves, who pay around 14,000 Rubles (218 USD) per month towards pensions on a maximum of 512,000 rubles (US$7,974) per year, or by regional governments who directly pay into the pension funds of their areas. Benefits and rate of pensions adjust overtime with inflation and the average wage. Due to the decrease in population for several years, and estimates of slow population growth, fears over the Pension Fund's ability to finance the pensions remain prominent in political discussion. Pensions remain the largest single budgetary obligation of the Russian Federation, which will most likely put increasing strains on future Russian development due to population woes.
