= Russian Customs Tariff =

Customs duty in Russia

The Russian Customs Tariff is the customs duty for the Russian Federation.

== History ==
The Common Customs Tariff of the Eurasian Economic Community went into force in 2010. This success was at least partly attributable to the economic crisis, which encouraged the three countries to accelerate their integration efforts. In 2011, the EurAsEC Customs Union was already working at full capacity, with economic agents operating within a common customs territory and using the Common Customs Tariff.

On 19 May 2011 Russia, Belarus and Kazakhstan signed a Treaty on the Functioning of the Customs Union within the framework of the Multilateral Trade System. All WTO-inconsistent investment measures, including preferential tariffs or tariff exemptions, applied in relation to the existing automobile investment programmes and any agreements concluded under them would be eliminated by 1 July 2018. No other trade related investment measures inconsistent with the WTO Agreement may be applied after Russia’s accession to the WTO. On 22 August 2012, Russia joined the WTO, becoming the first representative of the EurAsEC Customs Union and Common Economic Space member states in the WTO. At the same time, the Treaty on the Functioning of the Customs Union within the Multilateral Trading System entered into force. This Treaty provides that, from the date of Russia's accession to the WTO, the provisions of the relevant Agreements, as well as the obligations set out in the protocol on Russia's accession to the WTO and relating to legal relations whose regulation within the Customs Union is delegated by Russia to the bodies of the Eurasian Economic Commission, and legal relations regulated by international agreements that constitute the contractual legal framework of the Customs Union, become part of the legal system of the Customs Union. The Eurasian Economic Commission is actively working to ensure the fulfillment of Russia's obligations to the WTO.

The Russian Federation's WTO obligations are implemented in the Common Customs Tariff of the EAEU. The seven-year transition period for Russia's accession to the WTO ended in 2019.

== Retaliatory Measures With Regard to Third Party ==
Exceptions to the Common Customs Tariff of the Eurasian Economic Union are specified in Article 40 of the Treaty on the Eurasian Economic Union.

1. In case, if the possibility of application of retaliatory measures provided by international treaty of the EAEU with third party and (or) member States with third parties, the decision on introduction of retaliatory measures on the customs territory of the EAEU, including the increase of import customs duty rates, introduction of quantitative restrictions, temporary suspension of preferences or adoption of other measures within the competence of the Commission, affecting results of foreign trade with the relevant State, shall be taken by the Commission.
2. In cases provided in the international treaties of the member States with third parties that entered into force before 1 January 2015, the member States may unilaterally apply higher import customs duty rates in comparison with the Common External Tariff of the Eurasian Economic Union, as retaliatory measures, and unilaterally suspend granting of tariff preferences provided that administration mechanisms of such measures do not violate provisions of this Treaty.

On 7 March 2022, the Government of Russia in the first time approved a list of foreign states and territories that commit unfriendly acts against Russia, its legal entities and individuals. The Russian Federation believes that the countries that have restricted trade with Russia have directly violated the rules of the World Trade Organization. Russia distributed a statement to members of the organization, and the World Trade Organization published it on its website. In accordance with paragraph 2 of Article 40 of the Treaty on the Eurasian Economic Union, Russian Prime Minister Mikhail Mishustin has imposed increased tariffs on goods from unfriendly countries. A duty of 35% is imposed on imports of personal hygiene items, incense and weapons from unfriendly countries. The list includes shampoos and other hair products, individual deodorants and antiperspirants, products for aromatizing indoor air, detergents and cleaning products. The Association of Winegrowers and Winemakers of Russia proposes to introduce a 200% tariff on wine "from NATO countries", and the Government of Russia is considering such a proposal.

In 2024, increased customs duty rates of 35% of the customs value were added for such goods as confectionery, biscuits, toilet water, shampoos, detergents and cleaning products, etc., as well as shotguns, sporting and hunting rifles, rocket launchers and ammunition. The new conditions also affect wine and beer - the duty is set at 20%, but not less than $1.5 per litre. The 35% rate will apply to lead batteries, while the 50% rate will affect plywood, wallpaper, as well as some outerwear and zips.

On 1 January 2025, the Russian Government extended the list of goods from ‘unfriendly countries’ which are subject to increased duty. The updated list includes certain types of soft drinks, sauces, pasta, confectionery and flour products, meat and fish products, tinned finished products of vegetables, fruits and nuts. Duty rates will rise by an average of 10 percentage points from the current 5-20 %. For roasted and instant coffee the increase was from 8% and 7.5% to 13% and 17.5% respectively. Import duties for beer and cider will rise from 0.1 to 1 euro per litre. Import duties for spark plugs will be 25% instead of the current 10%. "The decision was taken as part of systematic work to develop responses to the sanctions imposed on Russia. The nomenclature of goods has been selected taking into account the capabilities of Russian companies to substitute imports of products from unfriendly countries. The measure will help boost investment and accelerate the development of domestic production. At the same time, competition and a wide range of products on the market will be ensured by maintaining imports at standard duties from friendly and neutral countries", - the Ministry of Economic Development commented on 31 December 2024. The full list of goods subject to import duties of 20-50% from unfriendly countries is established by the government decree No. 2240 of 7 December 2022, which has been amended several times.

=== US-Russia ===
Pursuant to section 201(a) of the Sergei Magnitsky Rule of Law Accountability Act of 2012 (P.L. 112-208) the U.S. Trade Representative to submit annually a report to the Committee on Finance of the U.S. Senate and the Committee on Ways and Means of the U.S. House of Representatives assessing the extent to which Russia is implementing the WTO Agreement. According to the Report "USTR plans to take to press Russia to comply with its WTO obligations." On 22 August 2012, Russia joined the WTO. The MFN rule requires that a WTO member must apply the same conditions on all trade with other WTO members, i.e., a WTO member has to grant the most favorable conditions under which it allows trade in a certain product type to all other WTO members. "Grant someone a special favor and you have to do the same for all other WTO members." On 16 March 2022 the WTO published a letter from Russia where it stated that the implementation of import tariffs (by the U.S. and G7) above MFN rates is clearly inconsistent with the relevant provisions of the GATT and GATS: "The Russian Federation would like to draw the attention of WTO Members to dangers looming over the multilateral trading system because of the recent aggressive and politically motivated trade restrictive actions of certain Members. ... Direct violations of the basic WTO rules by these Members have put severe pressure on global supply chains".

In 2022, it was explained what revocation of MFN status means: "In practice, should Congress pass such a law, buyers of Russian goods would no longer pay the current U.S. tariff rate. Instead they would pay the rates created in the 1930 Smoot-Hawley Tariff Act during the Hoover presidency. These rates are now listed in Column 2 of the U.S. Harmonized Tariff Schedule. More broadly, standard estimates of Smoot-Hawley average tariffs are about 20% overall, based on dividing tariff revenue by import value, as opposed to 2.8% in 2021 (or 1.4% excluding the Trump-era tariffs on Chinese goods and metals) or an even higher average of 59% excluding duty-free goods. As the averages and the umbrella example both suggest, non-MFN tariffs are generally seen as quite punitive, and often are so in reality." U.S Congress in 2022 voted to revoke Russia’s "most favored nation" trade status: "There are two categories you can be characterized under U.S. law: One gets lower tariffs, and one gets higher ... For non-MFN, the average is around 20%". On April 8, 2022, the President signed H.R. 7108, the Suspending Normal Trade Relations with Russia and Belarus Act. With this legislation, imports from the Russian Federation and the Republic of Belarus are subject to the rates of duty set forth in Column 2 of the Harmonized Tariff Schedule of the United States (HTSUS). This legislation also granted authorization to the President to proclaim increases in the Column 2 rates of duty applicable to the products of Russia or Belarus. The page on cbp.gov was last modified on January 31, 2025. By Proclamation 10420 of June 27, 2022 Baiden Increased Duties on Certain Articles From the Russian Federation.

Since 2019, the WTO's dispute settlement mechanism has been de facto paralysed due to the United States vetoing the appointment of judges to the WTO's Supreme Appellate Body, and without a functioning Appellate Body, no final rulings can be made.

As of 3 April 2025, according to Kommersant's source in the Eurasian Economic Commission, which regulates the import duties of the Eurasian Economic Union countries, they are unlikely to change - this is a well-established opinion. "The Union as a whole is not significantly affected by the tariff increase, most countries will be subject to a duty of 10%, which in the new realities can be considered the most favourable treatment". At the same time, Russia itself has sufficient freedom to impose unilateral restrictive measures, which often happened after 2022. If Russia finds itself hit by other countries raising duties in response to a US import tariff hike, it will still have the option to respond accordingly. On 6 April 2025, the Russian Ministry of Economic Development responded to Trump's tariffs and the situation in the world that "Most WTO members have mechanisms to respond to imports that damage the domestic economy. Both Russia and the EAEU have such mechanisms. There are public procedures, requirements and criteria that allow both the government and Russian companies to initiate appropriate decisions on market protection." On 9 April Deputy Prime Minister Alexei Overchuk also said that Russia has no significant trade with the United States: "As for our country, on the one hand, a record number of sanctions have been imposed on it, aimed at curbing our development, and on the other hand, Russia still has no significant trade with this country".

== See also ==
- Customs Code of Russia
- Federal Customs Service of Russia
