= Taxpayer Identification Number (Russia) =

Tax identification number used in Russia

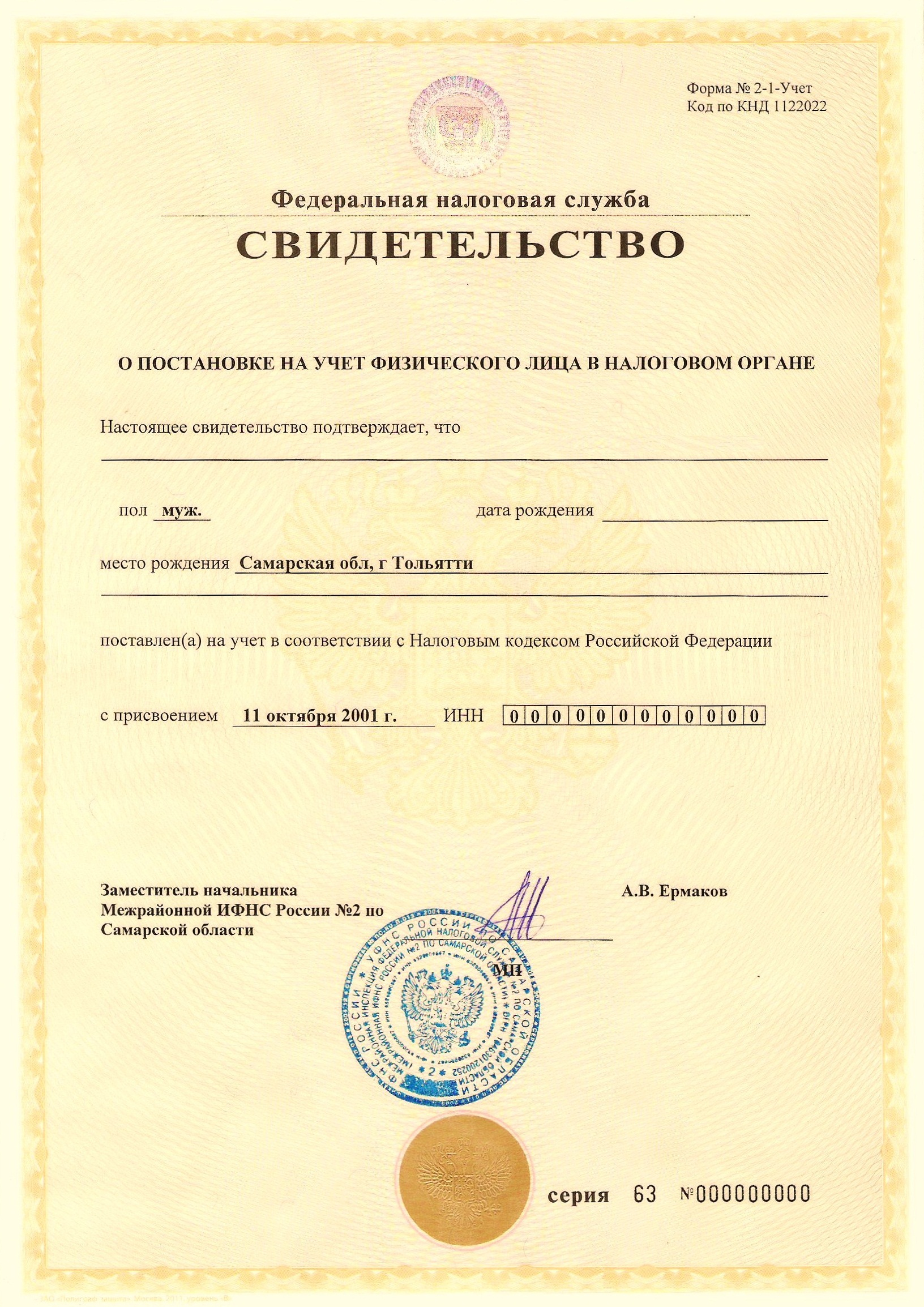
A certificate attesting the assignment of INN issued by the Federal Taxation Service in 2001

Taxpayer Identification Number (Russian: Идентификационный номер налогоплательщика) is a numerical code used to organize the registration of taxpayers in Russia. It is assigned to the tax records of both legal entities and individuals by the Federal Taxation Service. The INN has been issued since 1993, when the Federal Taxation Service (then State Tax Service) began creating a unified taxpayer registry in accordance with Federal Law No. 2118-1 "On the Basics of the Tax System in the Russian Federation" (from 27 December 1991) with actual procedure for assigning later detailed by the Government Resolution No. 552 of 27 July 1993 and Order of the State Tax Service No. ВГ-3-12/29 of 19 August 1993. Individual entrepreneurs since 1997, and other individuals since 1999 (coinciding with the entry into force of the first part of the Tax Code of the Russian Federation).

== Types ==
=== Individual ===
This is a 12-digit sequence. The first four digits represent the code of the tax authority that issued the INN; the next six digits are the serial number of the taxpayer’s entry in the territorial section of the Unified State Register of Taxpayers (maintained by the issuing tax authority); and the final two digits serve as a check digit (or control number) used to verify the accuracy of the sequence.

=== Individual entrepreneur ===
This is assigned when an individual registers as an individual entrepreneur, provided they do not already possess an INN. If they already have one, that existing INN is used.

=== Russian legal entity ===
This is a 10-digit sequence. The first four digits represent the code of the tax authority that issued the INN; the next five digits are the serial number of the taxpayer's entry in the territorial section of the Unified State Register of Taxpayers (maintained by the issuing tax authority); and the final digit serves as a check digit (or control number) used to verify the accuracy of the sequence. Together with the KPP (Reason for Registration Code), the INN allows for the identification of each separate subdivision of a legal entity; therefore, both codes are frequently displayed and used together—for instance, when specifying an organization's payment details.

=== Foreign legal entity ===
Since January 1, 2005, this has always begun with the digits "9909" followed by a 5-digit code corresponding to the foreign organization, with the final digit serving as a check digit.

== Obtaining ==
An individual's Taxpayer Identification Number (INN) is assigned by the tax office at their place of residence upon presentation of an internal passport and a copy of the passport, along with the submission of an application. The certificate—an A4-sized document containing the individual's full name, date and place of birth, and the INN itself—is issued within a maximum of five days. For individual entrepreneurs, the INN is provided alongside other registration documents. An INN may also be obtained via a power of attorney, which must be notarized. In the 1990s, the INN certificate was issued in a business-card format; subsequently, the format was changed to an A4 sheet. For individuals born in Russia from 1999 onwards, an INN is assigned automatically by the tax authorities based on information provided by the Civil Registry Office (ZAGS).

Upon request, an individual may had their INN, the name of the tax authority, its code, and the date of the entry recorded on page 18 of their internal passport, a practice abolished in January 2026. For a legal entity, an INN is assigned at the time of its registration with the tax office responsible for the registration of legal entities. The first four digits of an INN always identify the specific office of the Federal Taxation Service, corresponding to a code from the SOUN directory (a directory of tax authority codes used for taxpayer registration purposes).

== Reason Code ==
In addition to the Taxpayer Identification Number (INN), organizations are assigned a Tax Registration Reason Code (Russian: код причины постановки на учёт, known in its abbervation: КПП) upon registration with tax authorities, in accordance with the Tax Code of the Russian Federation. The KPP is a nine-character code structured as follows: NNNNPPXXX. Reading from left to right, the KPP consists of the following segments:

- NNNN (4 characters) — the code of the tax authority that registered the organization. This registration may be based on the organization’s legal address, the location of its separate subdivision (within the Russian Federation), the location of its real estate or vehicles, or other grounds stipulated by the Tax Code of the Russian Federation. This code is also used when the tax authority records information about an organization under the procedures governing the registration and deregistration of Russian entities—including their separate subdivisions, real estate, and vehicles—as well as individual citizens of the Russian Federation and individual entrepreneurs using the simplified patent-based taxation system.
- PP (2 characters) — the reason for registration (or for recording the information). The numerical value of the "PP" segment is determined by the Federal Tax Service's "Directory of Reasons for Registration of Corporate Taxpayers with Tax Authorities". For a Russian organization, the value ranges from 01 to 50 (with 01 denoting registration at the organization's legal address); for a foreign organization, the value ranges from 51 to 99. Specific values include:
  - "43" — registration of a Russian organization at the location of its branch;
  - "44" — registration of a Russian organization at the location of its representative office.
  - "45" — registration of a Russian organization at the location of its separate subdivision.
- XXX (3 digits) — the sequential number of the registration (or recording of information) with the tax authority based on the relevant grounds.

=== Calculation of check digits ===
For a 10-digit Taxpayer Identification Number (INN) assigned to a legal entity, the last (tenth) digit serves as the check digit:

$${n_{10} = ((2n_1 + 4n_2 + 10n_3 + 3n_4 + 5n_5 + 9n_6 + 4n_7 + 6n_8 + 8n_9) ~\bmod\ 11) ~\bmod\ 10}$$

The check digit, calculated using a method that may appear quite elaborate at first glance, still allows for errors—even when a single digit of the INN is incorrect. For example, consider 1181111110 and 1191111110. For the first number, 121 mod 11 = 0; for the second, 131 mod 11 = 10, and 10 mod 10 = 0.

For a 12-digit INN assigned to an individual, the last two digits serve as check digits:

$$n_{11} = ((7n_1 + 2n_2 + 4n_3 + 10n_4 + 3n_5 + 5n_6 + 9n_7 + 4n_8 + 6n_9 + 8n_{10}) ~\bmod\ 11) ~\bmod\ 10$$
$$n_{12} = ((3n_1 + 7n_2 + 2n_3 + 4n_4 + 10n_5 + 3n_6 + 5n_7 + 9n_8 + 4n_9 + 6n_{10} + 8n_{11}) ~\bmod\ 11) ~\bmod\ 10$$

The expression $a ~\bmod\ b$ means euclidean division of $a$ на $b$.

== Usage ==
An individual's Taxpayer Identification Number may be requested upon hiring; obtaining one remains voluntary. While it is mandatory only for civil servants and individual entrepreneurs, the number may be assigned without an individual's knowledge if necessary for the purpose of maintaining tax records for that person.

A foreign national who enters the Russian Federation under a visa-free regime and obtains a temporary residence permit is required to submit a copy of their tax registration certificate or notification within 12 months of their date of entry into the Russian Federation.

In tax accounting, the INN is used in place of personal data across virtually all documentation. Accounting and tax filings for legal entities and individual entrepreneurs must include an INN.
