= Taxation in Russia =

The tax system of the Russian Federation (Russian: налоговая система Российской Федерации ) is a complex of relationships between fiscal authorities and taxpayers in the field of all existing taxes and fees. It implies continuous communication of all its members and related objects: payers; legislative framework; oversight authorities; types of mandatory payments. The Russian Tax Code (Russian: Налоговый кодекс Российской Федерации) is the primary tax law for the Russian Federation. The Code was created, adopted and implemented in three stages.

The first part, enacted July 31, 1998, also referred to as the General Part, regulates relationships among taxpayers, tax agents, tax-collecting authorities and legislators, tax audit procedures, resolution of disputes, and enforcement of law.

The second part, enacted on August 5, 2001, defines specific taxes, rates, payment schedules, and detailed procedures for tax calculations. It was significantly amended in 2001–2003 with additions like the new corporate profits tax section and the new simplified tax system for small business. The Code is subject to regular changes which are affected through federal laws.

The Code is designed as a complete national system for federal, regional and local taxes but excludes customs tariffs. Rules and rates of regional and local taxation must conform to the framework established by the Code. Taxes or levies not listed explicitly by the Code or enacted in violation of its specific provisions are deemed illegal and void.

The Russian tax system tends to use moderate flat or regressive tax rates. It is highly centralized for a federal state and relies heavily on proceeds from oil and natural gas corporations, who themselves are mostly state owned. In 2006 the tax burden on oil companies exceeded 45 percent of net sales (compared to 12 percent in construction and 16.5 percent in telecommunications). Rates for oil-related taxes and tariffs, unlike regular taxes, are set not by the Tax Code but by government decree. The Russian Ministry of Finance estimated that revenues regulated by the Tax Code accounted for 68 percent of federal revenue in 2008 fiscal year, rising to 73 percent in 2010.

Individuals pay an income tax (13 percent), land tax (0.3 percent of the land's cadastral plot which is calculated by a special formula) and vehicle tax (which is linked to the vehicle's engine power). Most small businesses are eligible for simplified taxation and can choose one of the following taxes: income tax (6 percent) or profits tax (35 percent) or unified agricultural tax (6 percent, farmers only) or tax on imputed income (calculated by a special formula, certain companies only). Corporate taxes for medium and large businesses include profits tax (20 percent), value added tax (20 percent), property tax (0-2 percent) and some other taxes like water tax and mineral tax.

President Putin signed into law in 2024, a bill imposing a 13% progressive tax for those earning up to 2.4 million rubles ($27,500) annually, a 22% income tax on those earning above 50 million rubles ($573,000), and a 5% increase on corporate taxes.

== History ==
=== Taxation in Russia before the Code ===
Prior to enactment of the Code, Russian tax legislation was based on a patchwork of laws enacted in the last years of the Soviet Union (notably, the 1990 laws on personal and corporate income taxes), the 1991 law "On the framework of the tax system in the Russian Federation" and subsequent federal, regional and local laws and executive decrees; the underlying Soviet rules of accounting and business practices remained largely unchanged. Taxation in 1992–1998 was substantially decentralized: regional and local authorities were entitled to invent their own taxes, or could, on the contrary, create tax havens for "domestic off-shores".

In his February, 1995 presidential address Boris Yeltsin proposed to re-centralize and streamline the tax system through a unified Tax Code. Yeltsin declared that the Code's objective was to promote investments in manufacturing, while at the same time fully collecting taxes, and specifically demanded abolition of arbitrary tax preferences and tax evasion. He admitted that the state had no clearly formulated approaches to important taxation problems—these had to be resolved in 1995–1996. One year later, Yeltsin reiterated the call to curtail "new techniques" of tax evasion and "regional self-financing". He stated that the forthcoming enactment of the Code was only a start, that the government-sponsored draft was incomplete and that the proposed rates were excessive.

The only tax law enacted in this period and still effective in 2008 is the individual property tax (enacted in 1991, with amendments). Individual property tax is explicitly authorized by the Code but exists as a standalone law.

=== Enactment of Part One ===
The Government of Russia presented the first official draft of Part One to the State Duma in February 1996, four months prior to the 1996 presidential election; Part Two was presented in April 1997. Deputy Minister of Finance Sergey Shatalov promoted the bill. After more than a year of refinements, the Duma passed the bill in the first hearing (due process requires three stages, or hearings) on July 19, 1997. In June–October the Duma accumulated over 4,500 proposed amendments to the bill, making further progress impractical. In October 1997 the Duma and Government clashed over the federal budget for 1998 fiscal year, and the Government recalled the bill to appease its adversaries. When this stage ended, the Duma refused to come back to the old bill; Yury Luzhkov, major opponent of centralized tax collection, declared that "the tax code is already dead. It stinks".

The Duma restarted the process, inviting competing drafts to be filed by January 31, 1998. By the deadline the Duma had received ten alternatives, as well as the new government version; this time sponsored by Minister of Finance Mikhail Zadornov and his deputy Mikhail Motorin. They made it clear that any alternative draft would face veto by the President, at the same time incorporating ideas from the competing drafts. On April 16, 1998 the Duma finally chose the Government draft over the alternatives with a 312 to 18 vote.

Enactment of the Code was hastened by the imminent 1998 Russian financial crisis. Sergei Kiriyenko, appointed Prime Minister in April 1998, included the Code in the government's anti-crisis package. Yeltsin threatened to impose the Code by decree if the Duma failed to quickly enact it. On July 16, 1998 the State Duma discarded budget-balancing proposals, but approved the third, and final, hearing on Part One; the next day it was stamped by the Federation Council and finally signed into law by the President on July 31, 1998 (to become effective on January 1, 1999 with certain exclusions). It was officially published in Rossiyskaya Gazeta on August 6. Anti-crisis actions failed, and on August 17, 1998 Russia defaulted on its government bonds.

=== Enactment of Part Two ===
While Part One was instrumental in re-designing day-to-day relationships between taxpayers and the state, it did not address specific taxes; thus, in 1999–2000 taxpayers still paid multiple taxes with the old rates. Part Two, implemented under Vladimir Putin (enacted in August 2000, effective January 1, 2001) promulgated a flat 13 percent personal income tax rate, and replaced various social contributions with a unified social tax (UST). In 2001 collection of personal income tax increased by 26 percent (adjusted for inflation). Tax compliance improved; an estimated one third of previously untaxed jobs were added to the tax rolls, although economists cannot separate the effects of tax rates from those of general economic recovery and improved law enforcement.

A commitment to abolish sales-based taxes was reflected in the abolition of the municipal housing tax (2000) and, eventually, the road tax and retail sales tax (2003). To offset the resulting drop in municipal revenue, Putin temporarily increased corporate profit tax rates for 2001 to 35 percent (43 percent for banks); the framework of profit taxation had yet to be redefined.

=== Major amendments and revisions ===
The second, and probably most important, stage of Putin's tax reforms—Chapter 25 of the Code dealing with corporate profits—was enacted in August 2001 (effective January 1, 2002). The tax rate was decreased to 24 percent for all taxpayers. Dividend taxation decreased to 6 percent (15 percent for non-residents). At the same time, the Code abolished tax breaks, broadening the tax base. Chapter 25 also instituted a special set of accounting rules for profit tax purposes; businesses could choose either to harmonize their statutory and tax accounting or maintain two sets of books. Gaps between statutory and tax accounting persisted, precluding complete harmonization.

In December 2001 legislators created a simplified tax system for agriculture. A string of amendments in July 2002 resulted in present-day simplified tax system for small businesses, imputed tax on retail operations, and redesigned the taxation of private and corporate motor vehicles.

On January 1, 2004 the VAT rate decreased from 20 percent to 18 percent. In 2007–2008 Putin, both as president and later as prime minister, promoted a decrease in the VAT rate to 12 percent by 2010; Putin's allies Sergey Chemezov and Minister of Economics Elvira Nabiullina support this proposal. Minister of Finance Alexey Kudrin opposed the change due to the need to finance the Pension Fund and the rearmament of Russian troops.

On January 1, 2005 Russia abolished the tax on advertising—the last remaining provision from the early 1990s.

The government slowly but regularly increases excise taxes on alcohol, tobacco, gasoline and motor oil; the current Code provides a detailed plan for raising the rates until 2010 fiscal year.

In the wake of the 2008 Russian financial crisis, September 18, 2008, the Russian Ministry of Finance declared short-term tax changes:

- The VAT rate for 2008 would remain fixed at 18 percent;
- By the end of 2008, the unified social tax should be either raised or totally redesigned to help balance social expenditures. In October 2008 the government agreed on changes to the UST mechanism and rate curve, effectively splitting the unified tax into separate payments. All wages and salaries up to 415,000 roubles (16,210 US dollars) per year are subject to a 26 percent pension contribution; income in excess of 415,000 roubles is not taxable. Adding other social contributions, the maximum marginal rate rose to 34 percent.

== Definition of Tax and Levy ==
As it is going to be discussed in the upcoming paragraphs, it is needed to define clearly the word tax and levy.

According to the Russian Tax Code, a tax is a mandatory payment collected from both organizations and individuals. This payment is non-refundable and compulsory, obtained by transferring their monetary resources. The purpose of taxation is to fund governmental and municipal activities, leveraging rights of ownership, economic jurisdiction, or operational management.

Whereas a term levy could be understood as a mandatory payment required from both organizations and individuals. It is a prerequisite for state authorities and local government bodies to perform specific legally significant actions, such as granting rights or issuing permits (licenses) to the payers of the levy.

== Types of taxes ==
In Russia, these three kind of taxes and levies are established: federal, regional and local taxes.

There are also three types of tax systems: progressive, regressive, and proportional. Since 2021, Russia has been using a progressive (two-tier) tax system. Russia implemented a progressive tax with rates of 13% or 15% for those earning over 5 million rubles a year.

The following shall be classified as federal taxes and levies:

- value added tax;
- excise duties;
- tax on income of physical persons;
- tax on the profit of organizations;
- tax on the extraction of commercial minerals;
- water tax;
- levies for the use of fauna and for the use of aquatic biological resources;
- State duty.

The following shall be classified as regional taxes:

- tax on the assets of organizations;
- gaming tax;
- transport tax.

The following shall be classified as local taxes:

- land tax;
- tax on the property of physical persons.

Distinction between federal, regional and local taxes depends on the level of legislature that is entitled to establish rates for that kind of tax. Federal rates are explicitly set by the Tax Code; regional tax rates are limited by the Code but set by regional laws; local tax rates are established by the Tax Code and by normative legal acts of representative bodies of municipalities concerning taxes and are compulsorily payable in the territories of the relevant municipalities. Federal taxes such as the personal income tax may forwarded to regional governments; corporate profit taxes are split into federal and regional shares defined by the Code.

Other type of tax which is effective in Russia is special tax regime. It should be established by the Code and shall be applied in the cases and according to the procedure which are laid down in this Code and other acts of tax and levy legislation. In addition, it might provide an exemption from obligation to pay certain taxes or levies and to describe a special procedure for defining the elements of taxation.

These types of taxes shall be classified as special tax regimes:

- the system of taxation for agricultural goods producers (the unified agricultural tax);
- the simplified taxation system;
- the taxation system in the form of a unified tax on imputed income for certain types of activity;
- the systems of taxation in the context of the performance of production sharing agreements.

== Federal taxes ==
Distinction between federal, regional and local taxes depends on the level of legislature that is entitled to establish rates for that kind of tax. Federal rates are explicitly set by the Tax Code; regional tax rates are limited by the Code but set by regional laws. Federal taxes such as the personal income tax may forwarded to regional governments; corporate profit taxes are split into federal and regional shares defined by the Code.

VAT

VAT is the largest source of federal revenue (32 percent in 2008). VAT on imports (13 percent of federal revenue) is 22 percent as of January 1, 2026 (10 percent on selected foodstuffs) prior to release from the customs warehouse. VAT on domestic goods is calculated as the difference of VAT on sales (at the earliest of cash receipt or shipment of goods on credit) and input VAT on accrued costs.

VAT paid to suppliers that has not yet materialized into services or goods cannot be credited against current tax liability. VAT paid to suppliers on export sales is refunded in full if the seller receives payment for exports within 6 months of shipment. Refund of export VAT has become a major source of fraud, while law-abiding exporters have to resort to court action to get the refund.

VAT exemption extends to targeted companies in medicine, pharmaceutical industry, education, public housing and transportation; to private homes and apartments; to traditional banking and insurance services; to sales of exclusive copyright on software, integrated circuit topologies and similar high technology contracts.

VAT ineligibility is a very common charge by tax authorities. An April 2004 ruling by the Constitutional Court of Russia that increased corporate tax liabilities was revoked by Supreme Arbitrage Court in December 2004. The Federal Tax Service resolved the same case one year later.

Mineral extraction tax (MET)

Tax on mineral extraction is the second largest source of federal revenue regulated by the Code; most of it is paid by oil companies. Tax rates for oil (per metric ton) are set by the government; its formula refers to world market prices (same for all domestic producers) and a "depletion factor", specific to each oil field. The latter has been regularly criticized as a source of corruption and unfair competitive advantage. New developments may be exempt for a time, companies extracting nickel, copper, and platinum-group metals in the Krasnoyarsk region were given a rate set at zero from 1 January 2026 to 1 January 2038.

Rates for other mineral resources are set in the Code as a fixed percentage of their market value (from 3.8 percent for potassium salts to 17.5 percent for gas condensate) or, in case of natural gas, at a fixed amount per unit volume. The tax is paid monthly based on physically extracted tonnage, not sales. A related but separate Water tax is paid by organizations physically extracting surface or subterranean fresh water, as well as by hydroelectric powerplants and timber rafting loggers.

From 1 January 2024 exported crude and processed oil was added into the MET regime as export duty fell to zero.

Corporate profit tax

Corporate profit tax (CPT) is the largest source of regional revenues. The rate for 2009 is 20 percent on pre-tax profits, 3 percent to the federal budget and 17 percent to regional budgets. The rate decreased from 24 percent effective in 2001–2008 in the wake of the 2008 Russian financial crisis.

Expense deductibility limitations were gradually eliminated in the years following enactment of Chapter 25, and as of August, 2008 practically all business expenses are fully deductible. The Code retains a principal statement that deductible expenses must be "economically justified and properly evidenced with documents". The tax authorities manage the specifics. Taxpayers resolve disputes through court litigation; resolutions of upper-tier Arbitrage Courts, clarifying gray areas of tax accounting, form a separate layer of tax environment that augments the Code.

Double taxation of dividends is completely eliminated when a Russian shareholder owns at least 50 percent of Russian or foreign subsidiary paying dividends (excluding foreign entities located in tax haven jurisdictions) for at least 365 days and the investment is worth more than 500 million roubles. All other dividends received by Russian shareholders are subject to 13 percent tax, up from 9% before 2015.

Excise tax

Excise tax is levied on manufacturers of raw and refined alcohol, alcoholic drinks stronger than 1.5 percent by volume, including beer; gasoline and diesel fuel, motor oils; passenger cars and motorcycles with engines in excess of 150 h.p.; tobacco products. The Code specifies strict licensing rules for oil refineries and alcohol distillers. Rates increased until 2010; by 2010, excise taxes of a typical cigarette pack will reach 15–30 percent, which is less than its European counterpart. Since 2007, cigarettes have been taxed based on a percentage of manufacturers' suggested retail price (MSRP). This approach made MSRP mandatory and quickly led to government-induced retail price fixing.

Unified social tax

Unified social tax (UST) is accrued on all employer-to-employee payments which are deductible for profit tax purposes; non-deductible payments like dividends or charity are not subject to UST. Pensions, severance pay, and travel expenses are not taxable. The schedule is regressive: annual income up to 280,000 roubles is taxed at 26 percent; marginal rate for income above 600,000 roubles is 2 percent. Rates in agriculture and in special high technology parks are lower. Note that a significant part of mandatory contributions to Pension Fund is not included in UST.

Pension Fund deficits have caused calls to increase UST rates or switch from regressive to flat rates. A proposal for a flat UST was initiated in July 2008 by INSOR, Dmitry Medvedev's think tank and further detailed in Putin's proposals made October 1, 2008.

Workplace accident insurance, enacted later, is not part of UST or the Tax Code. Each employer must contribute to group accident insurance. The rate varies between 0.2 percent and 8.5 percent, depending on the type of business. The rate for trading companies is 0.2 percent and for transportation companies 0.7 percent.

Income tax

Personal income tax is levied individually normally at 13 percent. There is no joint filing. Employers withhold income taxes, thus the taxpayers whose only taxable income was paid by employer do not need to file a tax return—except to claim a refund for itemized deductions. The most important deductions are for home purchase (once a life), and education and medical expenses. Deductions require documentation and are subject to limitations. Tax returns are mandatory for registered entrepreneurs and professionals (lawyers, notaries, etc.), sellers of personal assets and recipients of other income. Out of 10.4 million registered residents of Moscow, only 94 thousand filed tax 2006 returns and 105 thousand filed for 2007. State pensions and alimony are normally not taxable, as well as bank interest (unless it exceeds the refinancing rate set by Central Bank of Russia).

Capital gains from asset sales are taxable only if the seller owned the asset for less than 3 years. A special tax rate of 35 percent applies to lottery and gambling wins and excess of bank interest received over the threshold interest computed using refinancing rate. Interest rates are usually below the threshold, making interest tax free.

Withholdings are remitted to the employer's registered region, rather than the employee's. The governments of Moscow Oblast, Tver Oblast and Leningrad Oblast object to this policy. They are net exporters of suburban manpower to Moscow and Saint Petersburg. In March 2008 Moscow Oblast initiated a federal bill intended to change the system in favor of suburban territories.

Other taxes

Other federal taxes prescribed by the Code include a tax on animal and water wildlife, levied upon licensed hunters and fisheries, and a document tax (stamp duty), most notably the ad valorem duty required to start civil litigation in state courts.

In 2007, the Ministry of Finance estimated that taxes will generate federal revenues as follows:

Structure of federal revenue of Russia for 2008–2010
| Type of federal revenue | 2008 FY | 2009 FY | 2010 FY | Regulated by |
| Total revenue, billion roubles | 6,673 | 7,421 | 8,035 | |
| Oil and gas related revenue | 37% | 32% | 30% | |
| .. Tax on mineral resources | 13% | 11% | 11% | Tax Code |
| .. Export tariff | 24% | 21% | 19% | Government decrees |
| Other revenue | 63% | 68% | 70% | |
| .. VAT on domestic sales | 19% | 24% | 25% | Tax Code |
| .. VAT on imports | 13% | 13% | 14% | Tax Code |
| .. Corporate profit tax | 8% | 8% | 8% | Tax Code |
| .. Import and exports tariffs (other than oil and gas) | 8% | 8% | 8% | Government decrees |
| .. Excise taxes | 2% | 2% | 2% | Tax Code |
| .. Taxes on natural resources (other than oil and gas) | 1% | 1% | <1% | Tax Code |
| .. All other taxes (including collection of arrears) | 7% | 7% | 7% | Tax Code |
| .. Dividends and other non-tax revenue | 5% | 5% | 5% | Civil and international law |
| Total | 100% | 100% | 100% | |
| .. including revenue regulated by Tax Code | 68% | 71% | 73% | |

2023 one off excess profits tax

A one off tax raised in 2023 claiming back 10% of excess profits when comparing the profits in 2021-22 to 2018-19, applicable to companies making over 1 billion rubles profit. Estimated to raise 300 billion rubles.

== Regional and local taxes ==
All regional and local taxes in Russia are asset-related: property tax, vehicle tax, land tax and tax on gambling businesses. These taxes are assessed and paid in re. Exact rates are set by regional (property, vehicles, gambling) or municipal (land) legislators within the Code's framework. Estimating liabilities under this multi-tiered system can be done using interactive progressive tax calculators.

Land tax is the only local tax in Russia: its rates are set by municipal authorities (excluding the federal cities of Moscow and Saint Petersburg, where the rates are set by city legislators). The maximum rate is 0.3 percent on lands zoned for agriculture, housing and dachas, and 1.5 percent on other lands. Forest reserves and bodies of water are exempt. Land values are periodically assessed by land registrars and kept substantially below market prices. Unlike corporate property tax, land tax is paid by individual taxpayers.

Corporate property tax, or tax on fixed assets, is assessed on year-averaged book value of fixed assets excluding land (which is subject to land tax). Radioactive waste storage facilities, space satellites, church property and other itemized assets are specifically exempt from taxation. The maximum rate is 2.2 percent; regional authorities can vary rates depending on types of taxpayers and assets. This provides a method to establish disguised individual preferences, which are outlawed by the Code.

Vehicle tax is levied annually on owners of motor vehicles and trailers, ships, and aircraft. Commercial ships and aircraft operated by transportation companies, agricultural, military vehicles and ambulances are exempt. The Code establishes maximum rates tied to engine power. Rates increase steeply with increasing horsepower. For example, in 2009 fiscal year the city of Moscow levies 700 roubles on a 100 h.p. passenger car, 2400 roubles on 120 h.p., 12,000 roubles on 200 h.p. and 45,000 roubles on 300 h.p. Taxation does not depend on emission levels.

Tax on gambling businesses is paid by registered gambling outlets at a flat rate per each table, slot machine or bookmaker's cash desk. The Code provides both minimum and maximum rate limits (1:5 ratio), thus prohibits establishment of tax-free gambling. For example, one slot machine is taxed at 1,500–7,500 roubles a year, and one table at 25,000–125,000 roubles a year. From July 1, 2009 gambling in Russia is banned, except in four specially designated gambling areas in remote regions. Online gambling is banned.

== Special taxation frameworks ==
The set of specific federal and regional corporate taxes outlined above (i.e. regular CPT, VAT, UST and property tax), which by default is mandatory for all corporate taxpayers and registered individual entrepreneurs, is known as General taxation system. Three alternative tax systems replace the above taxes with a simplified procedure:

Imputed taxation applies to specific, typically small business, activities involving trading with general public in cash: small retail and food service outlets, hotels, repair shops, taxi companies, etc. Imputed tax, uses rates set by local authorities (per square meter of shop space, per vehicle etc.) All eligible businesses use imputed taxation. The law is also mandatory for eligible parts of larger corporations, even if they are individually insignificant. For example, a cafeteria of a large steel mill is usually considered a subject of imputed tax and the mill must account for it as a separate taxable unit (the core business remains on terms of general taxation system).

Simplified taxation system applies to small businesses with annual sales less than 60,000,000 rubles. Banks, insurers, foreign companies and certain other professions and businesses are not eligible. The average number of employees in the firm should not exceed 100 during the year and total assets should not exceed 100,000,000 rubles to be eligible. Unified tax is levied either on gross receipts at 6 percent, or on profit before income tax at 15 percent; the choice of either option, is made by the taxpayer. Simplified system prescribes a specific set of accounting rules, thus gross receipts and gross margins of eligible businesses are, usually, higher than they would be under general accounting and taxation systems.

An eligible business can elect either simplified or general taxation system at will with certain timing restrictions, which are usually once a year in December. If the business loses eligibility at any time during the year, it continues operating under simplified system until the end of the year, and then it must recalculate its tax obligations under general taxation system from the moment it became ineligible. The system does not allow taxpayers to pass prepaid input VAT to their customers; such customers who are VAT payers are unable to refund any VAT paid downstream. As a result, businesses engaged in B2B transactions prefer general taxation.

Taxation system for agriculture (including animal farms and fisheries) uses a flat unified tax levied at 6 percent on gross margins, with its own unique set of accounting rules. There are no limitations on size of the business as long as at least 70 percent of its income is generated by sales of its farm produce.

VAT exemptions outlined in special frameworks apply only to VAT on domestic sales. VAT on imports is payable by all importers regardless of their tax framework. Likewise, the insurance premiums payable to Pension Fund of Russia are not considered part of UST and are payable by all employers.

Finally, a Product-sharing agreement framework applies to a very limited list of joint state-private enterprises, typically in oil extraction.

== Taxation of foreigners and foreign investments ==
Foreign individuals present in Russia for 183 days in a year or more are treated as residents for tax purposes and are taxed at common 13 percent rates. If they are present in Russia for less than 183 days, they are subject to 30 percent income tax (15 percent for dividends). Wages and salaries paid to foreigners in Russia are subject to standard UST tax.

Foreign tourists cannot recover VAT on purchases made in Russia.

Branches of foreign legal entities are subject to general taxation. Foreign companies can elect to use either Russian or their homeland accounting systems. Cash transfers between a branch and overseas head office and back are not subject to withholding tax and are not considered taxable income or deductible expenses.

Payments to foreign companies that have no permanent establishment in Russia are subject to withholding tax at 10 percent on lease payments, 15 percent on dividends and 20 percent on all other payments other than payments for imported goods. These rates can be reduced through bilateral tax treaties.

Russian subsidiaries of foreign legal entities are treated as domestic taxpayers; unlike branches of foreign companies, cash transfers between subsidiary and its parent may be subject to withholding tax; cash transfers from parent to subsidiaries may be considered taxable income. Transfers and repayments of loans do not trigger immediate tax effects. A special thin capitalization rule penalizes subsidiaries of foreign shareholders if, instead of remitting after-tax dividends, they elect to pay interest on loans from shareholders. The Code effectively forces these companies to reclassify excessive interest into non-deductible dividends. Deductibility of royalties and service fees remitted from Russia to foreign companies is frequently disputed by tax authorities and has been subject of high-profile cases against subsidiaries of PricewaterhouseCoopers, Procter & Gamble and SABMiller.

== Double taxation and treaties ==
List of the tax agreements for the avoidance of double taxation (= a tax principle referring to instances where taxes are levied twice on the same source of income) between the Russian Federation and other States:

1. Albania
2. Algeria
3. Argentina
4. Armenia
5. Australia
6. Austria
7. Azerbaijan
8. Belgium
9. Belorussia
10. Botswana
11. Brazil
12. Bulgaria
13. Canada
14. Chile
15. China
16. Croatia
17. Cuba
18. Cyprus
19. Czech Republic
20. Denmark
21. Ecuador
22. Egypt
23. Finland
24. France
25. Germany
26. Greece
27. Hong Kong
28. Hungary
29. Iceland
30. India
31. Indonesia
32. Iran
33. Ireland
34. Israel
35. Italy
36. Japan
37. Kazakhstan
38. Kuwait
39. Kyrgyzstan
40. Latvia
41. Lebanon
42. Lithuania
43. Luxembourg
44. Malaysia
45. Mali
46. Malta
47. Mexico
48. Moldova
49. Mongolia
50. Montenegro
51. Morocco
52. Namibia
53. Netherlands
54. New Zealand
55. North Korea
56. Norway
57. Philippines
58. Poland
59. Portugal
60. Qatar
61. Romania
62. Saudi Arabia
63. Serbia
64. Singapore
65. Slovakia
66. Slovenia
67. South Africa
68. South Korea
69. Spain
70. Sri Lanka
71. Sweden
72. Switzerland
73. Syria
74. Tajikistan
75. Tajikistan
76. Thailand
77. Thailand
78. Turkey
79. Turkmenistan
80. Ukraine
81. United Kingdom
82. UAE
83. USA
84. Uzbekistan
85. Venezuela
86. Vietnam

== Types of tax audits ==
A tax audit is the primary way tax authorities monitor whether individuals and businesses are following the current tax laws correctly.

In this case, the tax audits provided for by the Tax Code of the Russian Federation are:

- Desk audit
- Field audit

A desk audit is a check of tax reports and other documents submitted by a taxpayer as the basis for calculating and paying taxes, as well as a check of other documents available to the Tax Authorities on the taxpayer’s activities, whereas a field tax entails a thorough examination of an individual or business' financial records conducted at their residence, place of business, or accountant's office. This examination is carried out by tax authorities to verify the accuracy of the tax return filed by the taxpayer.

== Criticism of the Russian Taxation System ==
Russian Taxation System faces a great criticism from both businesses and opposition parties on a regular basis. However, recently, with the deepening crisis, key structural organizations started to express their dissatisfaction with the current tax system as well. For instance, in December 20, 2015, Sergey Katyrin, President of the Russian Chamber of Commerce and Industry, proposed changes to existing tax regime through the Russian Gazette:

These are payments not specified in the Tax Code. They are introduced with the enactment of certain laws - for example, environmental fees, waste disposal fees, water purification fees, and so on. There are already more than 50 of them. Although some experts claim there are as many as 70. I won't argue. It's already too many! And the main issue is that nobody controls whether such fees are necessary, who calculates them, or where they go. At the same time, these payments become an unbearable burden for enterprises. That's why we propose creating a registry of non-tax payments and adopting a law that will serve as a basis for approaches to them.

— Sergey Katyrin

== See also ==
- Russian Customs Tariff
- Law of the Russian Federation
