= Unfriendly countries list =

List of countries considered by Russia to be unfriendly

Russia Designated "unfriendly" countries

The unfriendly countries and territories list (Russian: Список недружественных государств и территорий, romanized: Spisok nedruzhestvennykh gosudarstv i territoriy) is a collection of lists of countries and territories published by the Russian government that it says "commit unfriendly actions against Russia, Russian companies and citizens". Countries on the list are subject to certain restrictions related to their relationships with Russia, including trade and currency restrictions or personnel limits in the listed countries' diplomatic missions in Russia.

The list was first published in May 2021 and consisted of the United States and the Czech Republic. Following the 2022 Russian invasion of Ukraine and international sanctions imposed against Russia, the list has since been expanded to 49 states, including all G7 member states and all 27 member states of the European Union. Turkey is currently the only NATO member not on the list.

== Background ==
In June 2018, Russian President Vladimir Putin signed a law empowering the government to introduce countermeasures against countries determined to have engaged in "unfriendly" actions against Russia. The countermeasures listed included import and export restrictions, suspension or termination of international cooperation, or privatization of state assets. An announcement on the passage of the legislation published by Russian state media specifically named the United States as the law's target.

In April 2021, Russian foreign ministry spokeswoman Maria Zakharova announced that Russia would be publishing an "unfriendly countries list" that included the United States. Early drafts of the list were leaked and included up to ten countries, but the final list issued by Russia only contained two—the United States and the Czech Republic. In publishing the list, the Russian government restricted the Czech embassy in Russia to hiring no more than 19 Russian nationals, and prohibiting the U.S. embassy in Russia from hiring any local employees.

Russia's relations with both countries were at a low point at the time. The United States and Russia had recently expelled each other's diplomats and the United States imposed sanctions against Russia in retaliation to claimed Russian cyberattacks and interference in American elections. Similarly, the Czech Republic accused Russian intelligence officers of being behind two ammunition warehouse explosions inside the country in 2014.

=== List expansion ===
In February 2022, after Russia launched a full-scale invasion of neighboring Ukraine, numerous countries around the world began instituting economic sanctions against Russia in retaliation for the invasion with a goal of crippling the Russian economy, in addition to Micronesia's decision to sever diplomatic relations with Russia. In response, Russia expanded the unfriendly countries list to include 48 countries around the world that had imposed the sanctions or severed diplomatic relations.

The expansion was promulgated by Prime Minister Mikhail Mishustin through the signing of Government Order No. 430. This "list of foreign states and territories committing unfriendly acts against the Russian Federation, Russian legal entities and individuals" was approved in implementation of Putin's presidential decree No. 95 of 5 March 2022 "On the Temporary Procedure for the Execution of Obligations to Certain Foreign Creditors".

== Listed countries and territories ==
=== Under Federal law No. 127 ===
- United States only

=== Under Presidential Decree No. 243 and Government Order No. 1230 ===
On 13 May 2021, Prime Minister Mikhail Mishustin signed Government Order No. 1230, implementing Putin's presidential decree No. 243 on the application of measures to influence (counteract) unfriendly actions by foreign states on the basis of Federal Laws No. 281-FZ of 30 December 2006 "On Special Economic Measures and Compulsory Measures" and No. 127-FZ of 4 June 2018 "On measures to influence (counteract) unfriendly actions by the United States of America and other foreign states".

The order imposes a limit on the number of employees that designated countries can hire for their diplomatic missions and consular offices. If the number of employees so hired exceeds this number, the employment contracts must be terminated. The list applies only to foreign embassies on Russian territory, and in 2023 the Russian government warned that it would expand the list.

Country	Allowed personnel	Added	Ref.
United States	None	13 May 2021	
Czechia	19 employees	13 May 2021	
Greece	34 employees	20 July 2022	
Denmark	20 employees	20 July 2022	
Slovenia	None	20 July 2022	
Croatia	None	20 July 2022	
Slovakia	16 employees	20 July 2022	
Norway	27 employees	2 August 2023	

=== Under Presidential Decree No. 95 and Government Order No. 430 ===
- Albania (Note: Added under Government Order No. 430, issued 5 March 2022.)
- Andorra
- Australia
- The Bahamas (Note: Added under Government Order No. 2018, issued 23 July 2022.)
- Canada
- Iceland
- Japan
- Liechtenstein
- Micronesia
- Monaco
- Montenegro
- New Zealand
- North Macedonia
- Norway
- San Marino
- Singapore
- South Korea
- Switzerland
- Taiwan (Note: Listed as "Taiwan (China)". Russia does not recognize the government of the Republic of China (ROC), considering the Taiwan Area to be under the administration of the People's Republic of China (PRC) instead.)
- Ukraine
- United Kingdom (including British Overseas Territories and Crown Dependencies) (Note: Guernsey and the Isle of Man were designated under Government Order No. 2018, issued 23 July 2022. The remaining overseas territories were added to the list under Government Order No. 3216 on 29 October 2022.)
- United States
- Member states of the European Union

On 23 July 2022, the Russian government issued order No. 2018, adding the Bahamas and the British Crown Dependencies of Guernsey and the Isle of Man to the list.

On 29 October 2022, the Russian government issued order No. 3216, adding all remaining British Overseas Territories not already on the list. The Russian Cabinet's website said, "Eleven more British Overseas Territories have been added to the list that supported the sanctions imposed by the UK on Russia. These are: Bermuda, British Antarctic Territory, British Indian Ocean Territory, Cayman Islands, Falkland Islands, Montserrat, Pitcairn Islands, St. Helena, Ascension and Tristan da Cunha Islands, South Georgia and the South Sandwich Islands, Akrotiri and Dhekelia, Turks and Caicos Islands."

== Restrictions against listed countries and territories ==
The legal basis for instituting sanctions against countries deemed "unfriendly" to Russia was initially passed in June 2018 with a menu of available countermeasures, including import and export restrictions, suspension or termination of international cooperation, or privatization of state assets, but no specific targets were listed. When the United States and the Czech Republic were added to the list in April 2021, Russia restricted the numbers of local employees that could be hired by the two countries' diplomatic missions in Russia. The Czech Republic's embassy could only hire 19 Russian employees, while the United States embassy could not hire any.

In March 2022, in retaliation for sanctions imposed against Russia in response to their invasion of Ukraine, Russia added an additional 48 countries that had imposed sanctions against it to the unfriendly countries list. Creditors from countries on the list who sought to receive payments on debt were required to open a special bank account at a Russian bank to receive payments in Russian rubles, rather than another international currency. In addition, all new corporate deals between Russian companies and entities in countries on the unfriendly countries list had to seek approval from a government commission.

Putin announced several weeks later that Russia would only accept the ruble as payment for Russia's natural gas exports to countries on the unfriendly countries list. As a result of the freezing of Russian Central Bank foreign reserves in euro and dollars by the unfriendly countries, in addition to the SWIFT ban on dollar and euro transfers to or from a large portion of the Russian banking sector, Russia no longer considered payment in dollars and euro via foreign accounts viable. Russian Gazprombank and Rosneftbank were spared from the SWIFT sanctions to allow payments for Russian gas and oil to be processed to Gazprom and Rosneft. However, Russia still faced a risk that dollar or euro energy payments stored in these banks might also be frozen there in a future SWIFT ban extension. With the requirement to pay in rubles, this is forestalled. Putin said that as a result, it "made no sense" to receive payments in other currencies. In addition, the international sanctions against Russia caused the value of the ruble to plummet. The European Union, which was added to the list, relied on Russia for 40% of its natural gas imports, and forcing payments in rubles could help to inflate the demand for and value of the currency.

Putin signed a decree introducing visa restrictions for citizens from "unfriendly countries," a decision made in retaliation to hostile measures taken by the European Union, the Kremlin said on 4 April 2022. According to the decree, Russia will partially suspend its simplified visa agreements with EU member countries along with Norway, Iceland, Switzerland and Liechtenstein. The Kremlin said that the decree also ordered the country's foreign ministry to impose individual entry restrictions on foreigners and stateless persons who commit hostile acts against Russia, its citizens or legal entities.

Russia banned the export of inert gases, including neon and helium, to "unfriendly countries" on 31 May 2022. This was a response to a ban on electronics exports to Russia.

On 5 September 2022, Russia terminated the agreement with Japan on facilitated visits to the Kuril Islands by Japanese citizens, former residents of these islands.

On 7 December 2022, Mishustin imposed increased import tariffs of 35% and higher on goods, including hygiene products and weapons, from the "unfriendly countries" designated under Order No. 430.

In June 2023, Russia banned journalists from unfriendly countries from attending the 26th edition of the St. Petersburg International Economic Forum. Many foreign journalists had already left Russia for safety reasons.

=== Financial penalties ===
In March 2022, Russia adopted a law to allow local businesses to provide zero compensation to patent owners from unfriendly countries. Decree of the President of Russia number 299 modified intellectual property laws in Russia. Countries on the unfriendly countries list would not receive reciprocity for copyrighted goods.

In March 2023, Russia announced that people from unfriendly countries will be subject to a "voluntary" exit tax of up to 10 percent to be paid into the Russian federal budget, on the sale of shares in Russian companies. This was expanded in July 2023 so that companies leaving Russia must sell their assets to Russian buyers at a 50% discount. The decree also bans including buyback options.

August 2023 saw Russia pass a decree barring foreign investors from unfriendly countries from holding investments in major Russian businesses. The businesses were not specified but would include important banks and firms above a specific size when considering revenue, assets employees, or taxes paid. This means that shares can be taken from overseas investors and given to Russian investors.

August 2023 also saw Russia pass a decree (No. 585) to partially suspend certain sections of double tax treaties (DTT) with unfriendly countries which results in standard withholding taxes applying, 15% on dividends, and 20% on interest payments, royalties and non dividend profit distributions. Some double taxation will also now occur. The unilateral decree was made in breach of the terms of the DTTs and the Vienna Convention on the Law of Treaties. A non Russian business who maintains an establishment in Russia risks being taxed by Russia as well as its home country due to the suspension of the DTTs.

== Similar lists ==
The finance ministry on 5 June 2023 expanded its "offshore blacklist" to 91 countries to include the European Union, United Kingdom, Switzerland, United States, Canada, Japan, South Korea, Singapore, Taiwan, Australia and New Zealand. This list is for countries with low taxes or those that do not send financial information to the Federal Taxation Service of Russia.

On 17 September 2024, Russia published a list of countries which it alleged imposed "destructive neoliberal values" on their citizens which "contradict traditional Russian spiritual and moral values", intended to ease the process for their citizens to apply for Russian residence visas. This list of countries was identical to the unfriendly countries list, except for not including Hungary and Slovakia.

== See also ==
- Diplomatic expulsions during the Russo-Ukrainian War
- Boycott of Russia and Belarus
- 2022–2023 Russia–European Union gas dispute
- Russian Customs Tariff
- Ukraine's International Sponsors of War list
- Rogue state
