= Social Insurance Fund of the Russian Federation =

Russian federation budget fund

- Фонд социального страхования Российской Федерации (ФСС)

Federal service overview
- Formed: January 1, 1991
- Dissolved: December 31, 2022
- Superseding Federal service: Pension and Social Insurance Fund of the Russian Federation
- Headquarters: Orlikov pereulok, dom 3A, Moscow, Russia
- Federal service executives: Andrey Kigim (until Feb 2021); Alexey Polikashin (since Feb 2021, acting)
- Website: Ffs.ru

The Social Insurance Fund of the Russian Federation (Russian: Фонд социального страхования Российской Федерации) was one of the state budget funds, created to provide for the compulsory social security of Russian citizens. It was created on January 1, 1991, by a joint decree of the Council of Ministers of the Russian Federation and the Federation of Independent Trade Unions of Russia No. 600/9-3 from December 25, 1990. The State Duma decided (July 5, 2022) to fuse this fund with the Pension Fund of the Russian Federation and to establish a new united social fund titled Pension and Social Insurance Fund of the Russian Federation since January 1, 2023.

== Budget ==
The income of the fund came from compulsory social insurance, formed by contributions, from insurance contributions from industrial accidents and occupational diseases and from subsidies from the federal budget and the Federal Mandatory Medical Insurance Fund of the Russian Federation.

== Functions ==
The activities of the fund were governed by the Budget Code of the Russian Federation and the Federal Law "On the basis of compulsory social security", as well as other laws and regulations.

- Payment of benefits under compulsory social insurance, including the payment of temporary disability benefits ("Hospital")
- Provision for persons entitled to vouchers for spa treatment
- Providing disabled persons with technical means of rehabilitation and prosthetic
- Payment of benefits and maternity leave, benefits for childbirth, childcare *Benefits for children up to the age of eighteen years
- Payment of birth certificates
- Surcharge (25%) for primary health care working citizens
- Extra charge for check-ups working citizens
- Payment of additional medical examinations of working people engaged in work with harmful and dangerous factors
- Payment (full or partial) for the children of insured persons in the cost of permits located in the territory of the Russian Federation sanatorium and health organizations, open to the established order (including recreational facilities and improvement of children)

== Chairmen ==
- Natalia D. Malakhatkina (1991/93);
- Yuri P. Shatyrenko (December 10, 1993 - May 29, 1996);
- Yuri A. Kosarev (November 4, 1996 - April 14, 2004);
- Galina N. Karelova (April 14, 2004 - December 13, 2007);
- Sergey V. Kalashnikov (March 25, 2008 - January 29, 2010);
- Lyudmila N. Rau (January 29 - May 15, 2010);
- Sergey A. Afanasiev (May 15, 2010 - March 21, 2013);
- Andrew S. Kigim (March 21, 2013 - February 12, 2021);
- Alexey P. Polikashin (acting since February 17, 2021).
