= Pension and Social Insurance Fund of Russia =

Russian pension fund

Social Fund of the Russian Federation
- Социальный фонд России Российской Федерации (ПФР)
- Logo of the Pension Fund of the Russian Federation

Federal fund overview
- Formed: January 1, 2023
- Preceding agencies: Pension Fund of the Russian Federation; Social Insurance Fund of the Russian Federation
- Headquarters: Shabolovska ulitsa, dom 4, Moscow, Russia
- Federal fund executive: Sergey Chirkov, Chairman
- Parent Federal fund: Government of Russia
- Website: sfr.gov.ru

The Pension and Social Insurance Fund of the Russian Federation (Russian: Фонд пенсионного и социального страхования Российской Федерации; abbreviated as Социальный фонд России, СФР) is one of the state extra-budgetary funds. It was created by the federal law of 14.07.2022 No. 236-FZ "On the Pension and Social Insurance Fund of the Russian Federation" through the reorganization of the Pension Fund of the Russian Federation with the simultaneous merger of the Social Insurance Fund of the Russian Federation with it. The date of creation of the Fund is considered to be January 1, 2023.

== Structure ==
The Pension and Social Fund was created for the implementation of state pension provision, compulsory pension insurance, compulsory social insurance in case of temporary disability and in connection with maternity, compulsory social insurance against industrial accidents and occupational diseases, social security and the provision of social protection measures.

The fund is governed by a board with 35 members and a chairman. Organizational, technical and documentary support for the activities of the board is provided by the central office of the fund. The structure of the organisation also includes territorial offices in the constituent entities of the Russian Federation, as well as institutions subordinate to the fund, including rehabilitation centers.

The chairman is appointed to the position and dismissed from the position by the Government of the Russian Federation upon the proposal of the head of the authorized federal executive body. The current chairman is Sergey Chirkov.

To exercise control over the financial and economic activities of the fund, territorial bodies of the fund, separate divisions of the fund and institutions subordinate to the und, the Control and Audit Commission of the fund was established.

== Functions ==
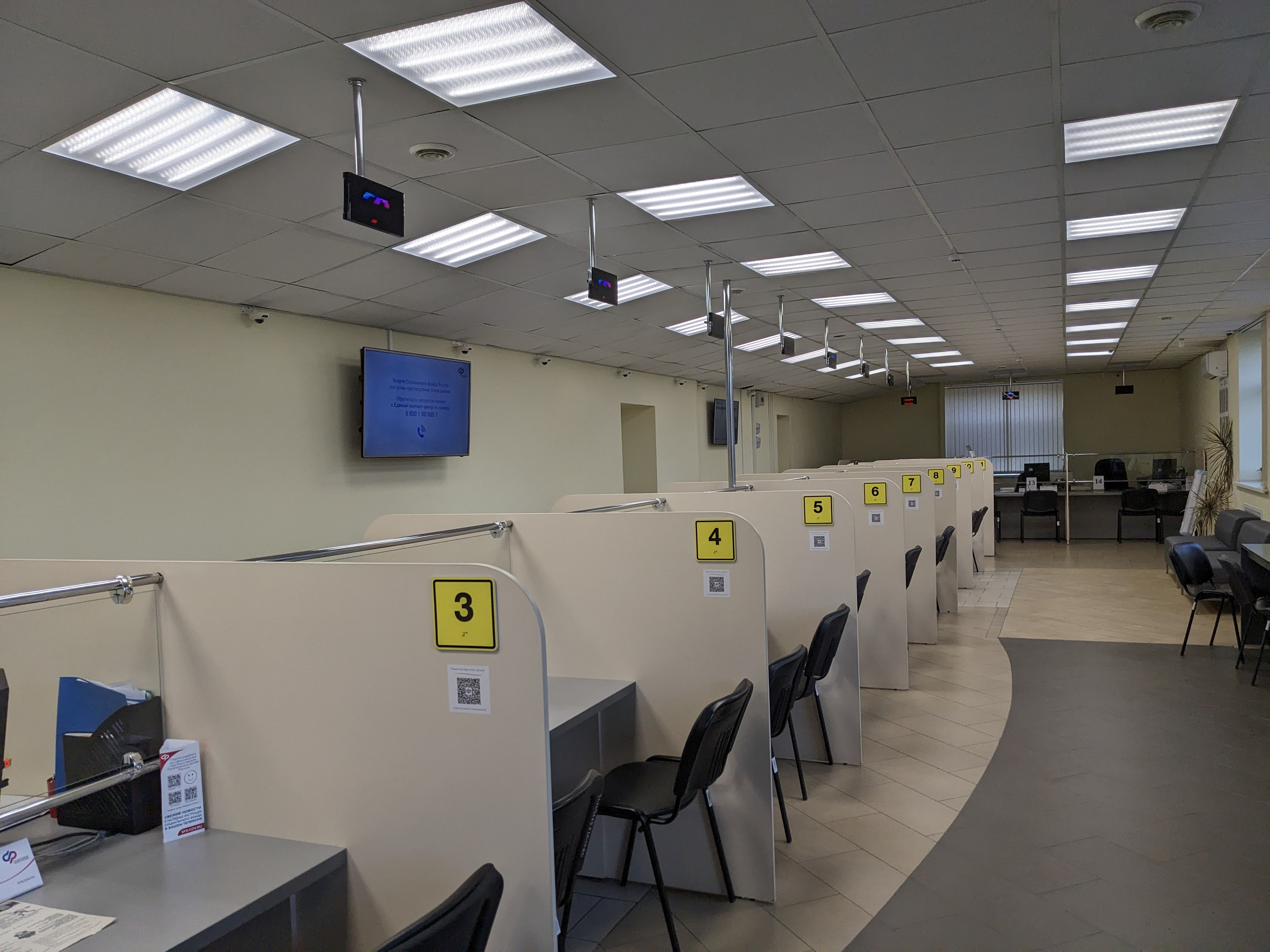
Pension and Social Insurance Fund of Russia (SFR) hall without employees, Petrozavodsk, 2024

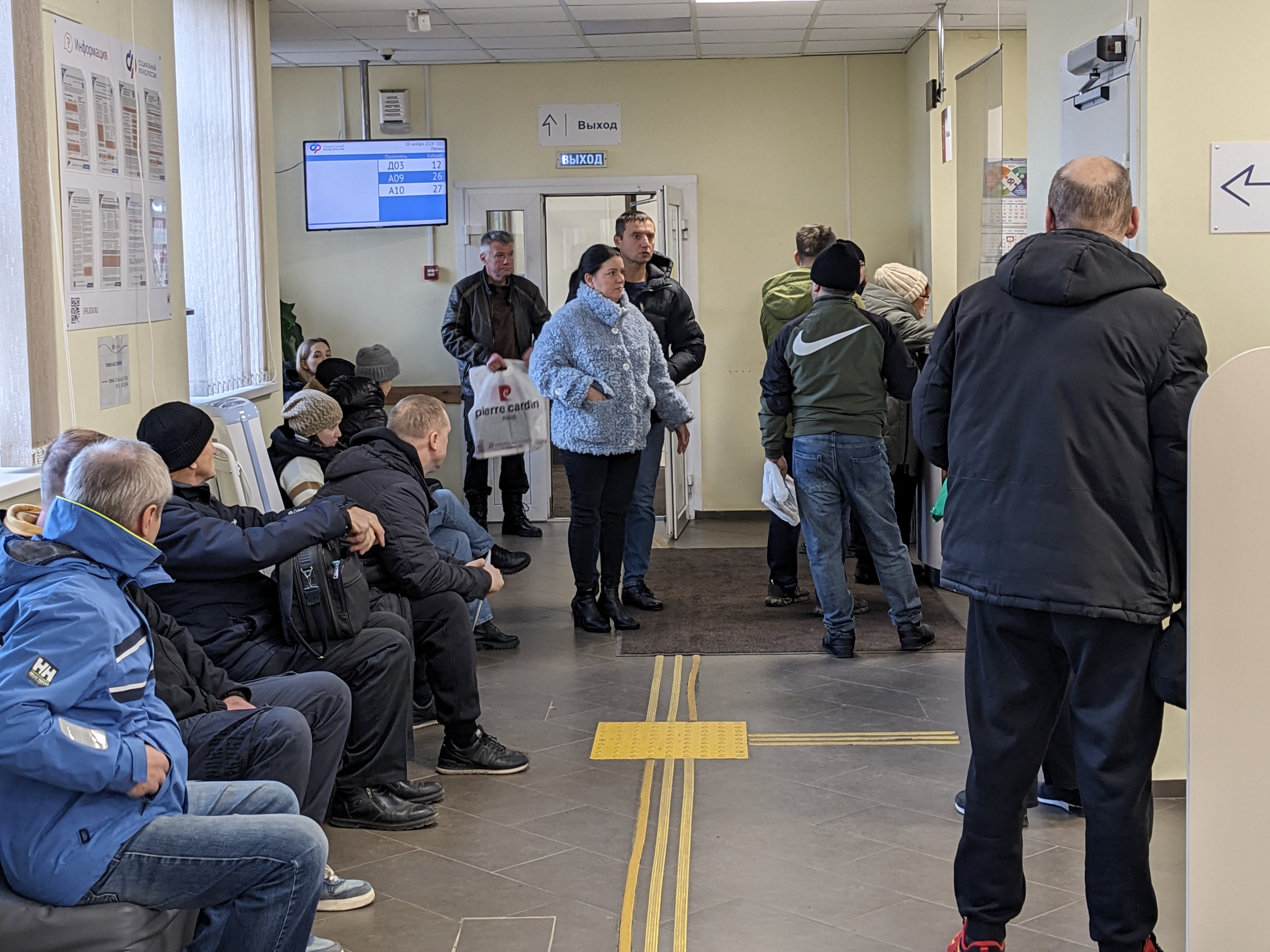
Long queue to one SFR administrator, Petrozavodsk, 2024

- Assignment and payment of pensions for compulsory pension insurance and state pension provision;
- Assignment and payment of state benefits, provision of compulsory social insurance and other types of security;
- Organization of individual (personalized) accounting in the compulsory pension insurance and compulsory social insurance systems;
- Organization of investment of pension savings;
- Actuarial assessment of the financial condition of the compulsory pension insurance and compulsory social insurance systems, long-term forecasting of their development;
- Provision of state guarantees, social protection (support) measures, social services to certain categories of citizens, including within the framework of provision of state social assistance;
- Organization of events in the field of medical, social and professional rehabilitation of insured persons.
