= 2023 Pskov Oblast gubernatorial election =

- 8–10 September 2023
- Turnout: 37.75%

Candidate	Mikhail Vedernikov	Pyotr Alekseyenko
Party	United Russia	CPRF
Popular vote	167,250	12,058
Percentage	86.30%	6.22%
Governor before election
Mikhail Vedernikov
United Russia
Governor-elect
Mikhail Vedernikov
United Russia

The 2023 Pskov Oblast gubernatorial election took place on 8–10 September 2023, on common election day. Incumbent Governor Mikhail Vedernikov was re-elected to a second term in office.

== Background ==
Then-Deputy Presidential Envoy to the Northwestern Federal District Mikhail Vedernikov was appointed acting Governor of Pskov Oblast in October 2017, replacing two-term Governor Andrey Turchak, who resigned to assume the position of United Russia General Council Secretary. Vedernikov won the following gubernatorial election with 70,68% of the vote, facing little opposition.

In October 2022 rumours spread out that Zarina Doguzova, former Head of the recently dissolved Rostourism, could be appointed acting Governor of Pskov Oblast. However, in December 2022 Vedernikov openly declared his intentions to run for a second full term.

== Candidates ==
In Pskov Oblast candidates for Governor can be nominated only by registered political parties, self-nomination is not possible. However, candidates are not obliged to be members of the nominating party. Candidate for Governor of Pskov Oblast should be a Russian citizen and at least 30 years old. Candidates for Governor should not have a foreign citizenship or residence permit. Each candidate in order to be registered is required to collect at least 7% of signatures of members and heads of municipalities. Also gubernatorial candidates present 3 candidacies to the Federation Council and election winner later appoints one of the presented candidates.

=== Registered ===
- Pyotr Alekseyenko (CPRF), Member of Pskov Oblast Assembly of Deputies (2016–present)
- Anton Minakov (LDPR), Member of Pskov Oblast Assembly of Deputies (2011–present), 2018 gubernatorial candidate
- Igor Romanov (Party of Growth), Member of Plyussky District Assembly of Deputies (2022–present), businessman, 2018 gubernatorial candidate
- Mikhail Vedernikov (United Russia), incumbent Governor of Pskov Oblast (2017–present)

=== Withdrawn ===
- Aleksandr Bayev (CPRF), Member of Pskov City Duma (2017–present)
- Yury Shokurov (Rodina), homeowner

=== Eliminated in primary ===
- Aleksandr Goncharenko (United Russia), Chairman of the Pskov City Duma (2022–present)

=== Declined ===
- Nikolai Bondarenko (CPRF), former Member of Saratov Oblast Duma (2017–2022)
- Oleg Bryachak (SR–ZP), Member of Pskov Oblast Assembly of Deputies (2011–present), son of former State Duma member Mikhail Bryachak, 2014 gubernatorial candidate
- Vladislav Davankov (New People), Deputy Chairman of the State Duma (2021—present) (running for Mayor of Moscow)
- Mikhail Ivanov (RPPSS), Deputy Chairman of Pskov City Duma (2022–present), former Chairman of Pskov Oblast Electoral Commission (2007–2009, 2017–2019)
- Sergey Leonov (LDPR), Member of State Duma (2021–present)
- Sergey Litvinenko (LDPR), Member of Pskov City Duma (2022–present), former Member of Pskov Oblast Assembly of Deputies (2016–2021)
- Andrey Makovsky (New People), Member of Pskov Oblast Assembly of Deputies (2021–present)
- Dmitry Mikhaylov (CPRF), Member of Pskov Oblast Assembly of Deputies (2011–2016, 2018–present), aide to State Duma First Deputy Speaker Ivan Melnikov (2017–present)
- Arkady Murylyov (CPRF), Pskov Oblast Commissioner for Entrepreneurs' Rights (2015–present), 2018 gubernatorial candidate
- Aleksandr Nozhka (CPRF), Member of Pskovsky District Assembly of Deputies (2017–present)
- Lev Shlosberg (Yabloko), former Member of Pskov Oblast Assembly of Deputies (2011–2015, 2016–2021), 2014 gubernatorial candidate
- Sergey Shnurov (Party of Growth), musician, songwriter, leader of Leningrad rock band
- Anastasia Udaltsova (CPRF), Member of State Duma (2022–present)
- Artyom Vasilyev (LDPR), LDPR regional office deputy coordinator

=== Candidates for Federation Council ===
Incumbent Senator Yelena Bibikova (United Russia) was not renominated.

- Mikhail Vedernikov (United Russia):
  - Natalya Gorbachyova, Chairwoman of the Civic Chamber of Pskov Oblast (2021–present), teachers' union leader
  - Alexey Naumets, Deputy Chief of Staff of the Russian Airborne Forces (2018–present)
  - Yury Sorokin, Member of Pskov Oblast Assembly of Deputies (2010–present)

== Finances ==
All sums are in rubles.

Financial Report	Source	Alekseyenko	Minakov	Romanov	Vedernikov
First		60,800	567,600	60,000	5,310,000
Final		732,720	2,517,200	65,000	24,902,884

== Polls ==
Fieldwork date	Polling firm	Vedernikov	Alekseyenko	Minakov	Romanov	None	Lead
25 July – 10 August 2023	FOM	81%	9%	5%	3%	2%	72%

== Results ==
Summary of the 8–10 September 2023 Pskov Oblast gubernatorial election results
Candidate	Party	Votes	%
Mikhail Vedernikov (incumbent)	United Russia	167,250	86.30
Pyotr Alekseyenko	Communist Party	12,058	6.22
Anton Minakov	Liberal Democratic Party	7,649	3.95
Igor Romanov	Party of Growth	4,582	2.36
Valid votes		191,539	98.83
Blank ballots		2,270	1.17
Total		193,809	100.00
Turnout		193,809	37.75
Registered voters		513,437	100.00

Governor Vedernikov appointed Russian Airborne Forces Deputy Chief of Staff Alexey Naumets (Independent) to the Federation Council, replacing incumbent Senator Yelena Bibikova (United Russia).

== See also ==
- 2023 Russian regional elections
