= Pskov constituency =

Russian legislative constituency

Pskov single-member constituency
- Constituency of the Russian State Duma

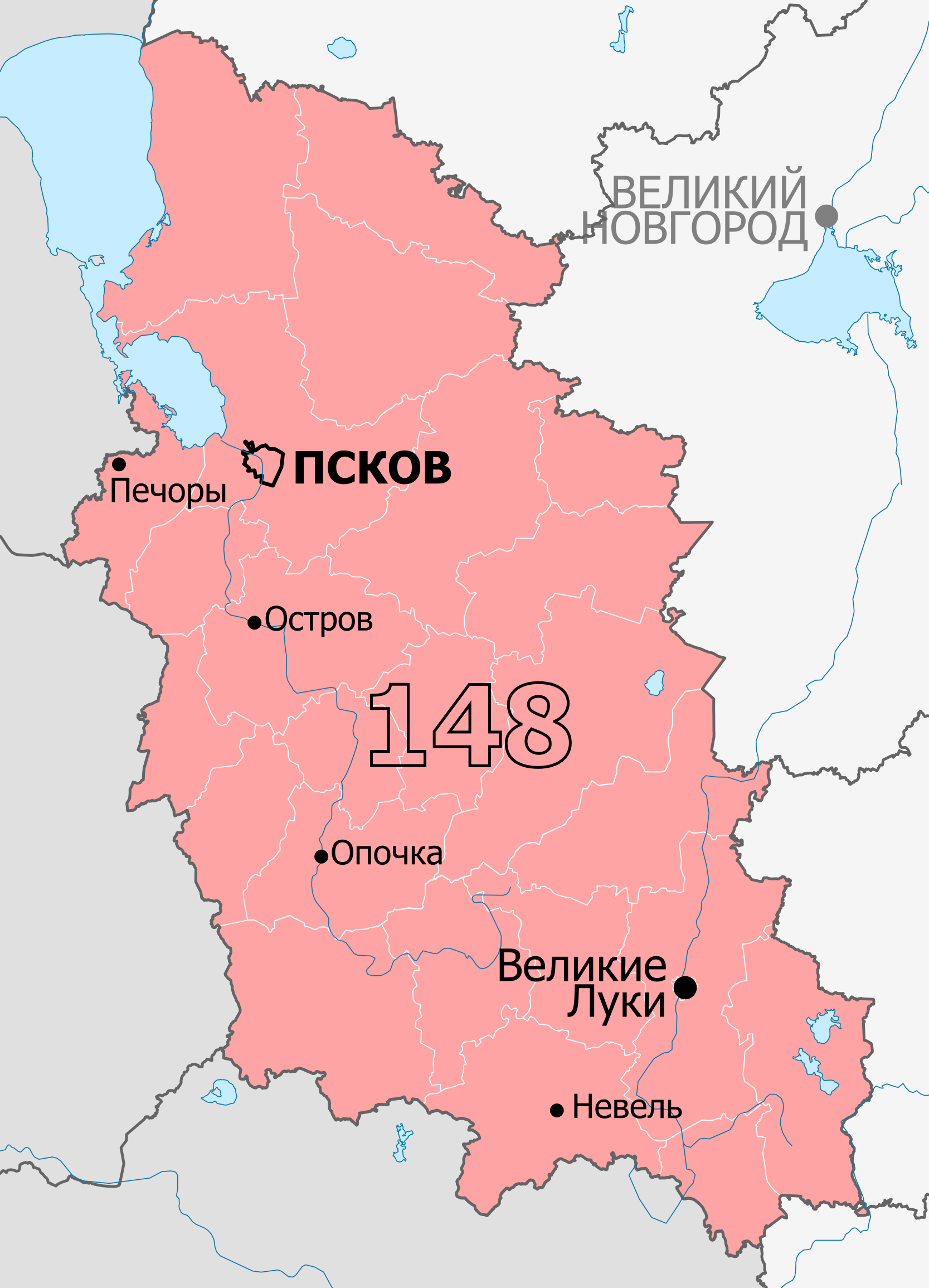
- Deputy: Alexander Kozlovsky; United Russia
- Federal subject: Pskov Oblast
- Districts: Bezhanitsky, Dedovichsky, Dnovsky, Gdovsky, Krasnogorodsky, Kunyinsky, Loknyansky, Nevelsky, Novorzhevsky, Novosokolnichesky, Opochetsky, Ostrovsky, Palkinsky, Pechorsky, Plyussky, Porkhovsky, Pskov, Pskovsky, Pushkinogorsky, Pustoshkinsky, Pytalovsky, Sebezhsky, Strugo-Krasnensky, Usvyatsky, Velikiye Luki, Velikoluksky
- Voters: 490,388 (2026)

The Pskov constituency (No.150 (Note: No.141 in 1993-2007, No.148 in 2016–2026)) is a Russian legislative constituency in Pskov Oblast. The constituency encompasses the entire territory of Pskov Oblast.

The constituency has been represented since the 2016 by United Russia deputy Alexander Kozlovsky, former Member of Pskov Oblast Assembly of Deputies and industrialist.

== Boundaries ==
1993–2007, 2016–present: Bezhanitsky District, Dedovichsky District, Dnovsky District, Gdovsky District, Krasnogorodsky District, Kunyinsky District, Loknyansky District, Nevelsky District, Novorzhevsky District, Novosokolnichesky District, Opochetsky District, Ostrovsky District, Palkinsky District, Pechorsky District, Plyussky District, Porkhovsky District, Pskov, Pskovsky District, Pushkinogorsky District, Pustoshkinsky District, Pytalovsky District, Sebezhsky District, Strugo-Krasnensky District, Usvyatsky District, Velikiye Luki, Velikoluksky District
The constituency has been covering the entirety of Pskov Oblast since its initial creation in 1993.

== Members elected ==
Election	Member	Party
1993	Yevgeny Mikhaylov	Liberal Democratic Party
1995	Aleksandr Nevzorov	Independent
1999	Mikhail Kuznetsov	Independent
2003	Aleksey Sigutkin	United Russia
2007	Proportional representation - no election by constituency	
2011	Proportional representation - no election by constituency	
2016	Alexander Kozlovsky	United Russia
2021	Alexander Kozlovsky	United Russia
2026	Alexander Kozlovsky	United Russia

== Election results ==
=== 1993 ===
Summary of the 12 December 1993 Russian legislative election in the Pskov constituency
Candidate	Party	Votes	%
Yevgeny Mikhaylov	Liberal Democratic Party	128,512	29.89%
Aleksandr Malyshev	Agrarian Party	97,781	22.75%
Vladimir Vagin	Independent	38,812	9.03%
Nikolay Glazychev	Independent	32,040	7.45%
Vyacheslav Poleshchenko	Independent	30,596	7.12%
Eduard Solodovnikov	Party of Russian Unity and Accord	21,569	5.02%
Nikolay Davydov	Independent	15,262	3.55%
against all		46,085	10.72%
Total		429,898	100%

=== 1995 ===
Summary of the 17 December 1995 Russian legislative election in the Pskov constituency
Candidate	Party	Votes	%
Aleksandr Nevzorov	Independent	130,805	27.87%
Gennady Bubnov	Independent	80,000	17.04%
Yevgeny Mikhaylov (incumbent)	Liberal Democratic Party	65,567	13.97%
Viktor Vasenkin	Our Home – Russia	44,894	9.58%
Ivan Komar	Independent	34,770	7.41%
Zinaida Kazakova	Power to the People!	20,933	4.46%
Yevgeny Malinin	Democratic Choice of Russia – United Democrats	17,302	3.69%
Lyudmila Kovaleva	Interethnic Union	14,094	3.00%
Viktor Balynsky	Independent	11,949	2.55%
Nikolay Panov	Independent	9,912	2.11%
Gennady Vladimirov	People's Union	6,663	1.42%
against all		26,496	5.64%
Total		469,420	100%

=== 1999 ===
Summary of the 19 December 1999 Russian legislative election in the Pskov constituency
Candidate	Party	Votes	%
Mikhail Kuznetsov	Independent	146,149	35.26%
Vladimir Nikitin	Communist Party	88,129	21.26%
Igor Savitsky	Independent	49,012	11.82%
Serafim Ivanov	Independent	25,047	6.04%
Vladislav Tumanov	Independent	22,915	5.53%
Viktor Antipov	Spiritual Heritage	13,326	3.21%
Yevgeny Podkolzin	Independent	12,665	3.06%
Aleksandr Trusov	Independent	5,991	1.45%
Yury Mironovich	Russian Socialist Party	3,414	0.82%
against all		41,858	10.10%
Total		414,529	100%

=== 2003 ===
Results by district: Aleksey Sigutkin: 20–30% 30–40%; Mikhail Kuznetsov: 20–30% 30–40%; Vladimir Nikitin: 20–30%

Summary of the 7 December 2003 Russian legislative election in the Pskov constituency
Candidate	Party	Votes	%
Aleksey Sigutkin	United Russia	93,851	27.15%
Mikhail Kuznetsov (incumbent)	Independent	73,478	21.25%
Vladimir Nikitin	Communist Party	54,093	15.65%
Mikhail Bryachak	Party of Russia's Rebirth-Russian Party of Life	42,750	12.37%
Viktor Mitropolsky	Independent	14,604	4.22%
Igor Smirnov	Russian Pensioners' Party-Party of Social Justice	9,984	2.89%
Vasily Tyomin	Liberal Democratic Party	8,602	2.49%
Lev Shlosberg	Yabloko	6,668	1.93%
Andrey Lisin	Independent	6,196	1.79%
Lyudmila Labunina	Independent	2,672	0.77%
against all		28,768	8.32%
Total		345,977	100%

=== 2016 ===
Summary of the 18 September 2016 Russian legislative election in the Pskov constituency
Candidate	Party	Votes	%
Alexander Kozlovsky	United Russia	94,372	40.88%
Aleksandr Rogov	Communist Party	33,472	14.50%
Oleg Bryachak	A Just Russia	28,819	12.48%
Anton Minakov	Liberal Democratic Party	21,463	9.30%
Lev Shlosberg	Yabloko	13,669	5.92%
Vyacheslav Yevdokimenko	Communists of Russia	11,701	5.07%
Mikhail Khoronen	Patriots of Russia	6,415	2.78%
Konstantin Vilkov	Rodina	3,636	1.57%
Anna Galkina	Civic Platform	2,886	1.25%
Vasiliy Krasnov	Party of Growth	2,805	1.22%
Remm Malyshkin	The Greens	2,015	0.87%
Biysultan Khamzayev	Civilian Power	1,222	0.53%
Total		230,853	100%

=== 2021 ===
Summary of the 17-19 September 2021 Russian legislative election in the Pskov constituency
Candidate	Party	Votes	%
Alexander Kozlovsky (incumbent)	United Russia	88,032	38.68%
Dmitry Mikhaylov	Communist Party	27,880	12.25%
Oleg Bryachak	A Just Russia — For Truth	27,430	12.05%
Artur Gayduk	Yabloko	20,534	9.02%
Vyacheslav Yevdokimenko	Communists of Russia	14,385	6.32%
Anton Minakov	Liberal Democratic Party	11,618	5.11%
Andrey Makovsky	New People	11,599	5.10%
Mikhail Ivanov	Party of Pensioners	10,683	5.69%
Igor Romanov	Party of Growth	3,699	1.63%
Mikhail Lebedik	Rodina	3,220	1.41%
Total		227,576	100%

=== 2026 ===
Summary of the 18-20 September 2026 Russian legislative election in the Pskov constituency
Candidate	Party	Votes	%
Alexander Kozlovsky (incumbent)	United Russia	129,563	50.95%
Dmitry Mikhaylov	Communist Party	31,850	12.53%
Natalya Tudakova	A Just Russia	18,214	7.16%
Anton Minakov	Liberal Democratic Party	17,223	6.77%
Yevgeny Vasilyev	Yabloko	15,619	6.14%
Igor Romanov	New People	15,155	5.96%
Mikhail Ivanov	Party of Pensioners	10,261	4.04%
Pavel Biktashev	Rodina	5,805	2.28%
Kirill Sorokin	The Greens	4,968	1.95%
Total		254,270	100%
