= Governor of Pskov Oblast =

Highest-ranking official in Pskov Oblast, Russia

- Coat of arms of Pskov Oblast

- Incumbent; Mikhail Vedernikov since 17 September 2018
- Seat: Pskov
- Term length: 5 years
- Constituting instrument: Charter of Pskov Oblast, Section 5
- Inaugural holder: Anatoly Dobryakov
- Formation: 1991
- Website: pskov.ru

The governor of Pskov Oblast (Russian: Губернатор Псковской области) is the highest official of Pskov Oblast, a federal subject of Russia. The governor heads the executive branch in the region.

== History of office ==
On 15 November 1991, by the decree of president Boris Yeltsin, the director of Pskovnefteprodukt enterprise Anatoly Dobryakov was appointed Head of Administration of Pskov Oblast. In May 1992, Dobryakov was removed from office after being accused of involvement in illegal selling of fuel and non-ferrous metals to the Baltic states. Deputy mayor of Pskov for economic reforms Vladislav Tumanov was appointed instead. In October 1996 he lost the election to Yevgeny Mikhailov, who became the first Liberal Democrat elected governor in Russia. The 2000 election was the only one to use the first-past-the-post system. On 1 January 2006 the office of the Head of Administration was renamed into Governor of Pskov Oblast.

== List of officeholders ==
No.	Portrait	Governor	Tenure	Time in office	Party	Election
1		Anatoly Dobryakov (1939–2003)	24 October 1991 – 5 May 1992 (removed)	194 days	Independent	Appointed
–		Yury Shmatov (1937–2023)	5 May 1992 – 22 May 1992 (successor took office)	17 days	Independent	Acting
2		Vladislav Tumanov (born 1958)	22 May 1992 – 10 November 1996 (lost election)	4 years, 172 days	Independent	Appointed
3		Yevgeny Mikhailov (born 1963)	10 November 1996 – 17 December 2004 (lost re-election)	8 years, 37 days	Liberal Democratic → United Russia	1996; 2000
4		Mikhail Kuznetsov (born 1968)	17 December 2004 – 16 February 2009 (resigned)	4 years, 61 days	Independent → United Russia	2004
–		Andrey Turchak (born 1975)	16 February 2009 – 27 February 2009	8 years, 238 days	United Russia	Acting
5		Andrey Turchak (born 1975)	27 February 2009 – 27 February 2014 (term end)	8 years, 238 days	United Russia	2009 (Note: Appointed by the president of Russia with the consent of the Pskov Oblast Assembly of Deputies.)
–		Andrey Turchak (born 1975)	27 February 2014 – 25 September 2014	8 years, 238 days	United Russia	Acting
(5)		Andrey Turchak (born 1975)	25 September 2014 – 12 October 2017 (resigned)	8 years, 238 days	United Russia	2014
–		Mikhail Vedernikov (born 1975)	12 October 2017 – 17 September 2018	8 years, 360 days	United Russia	Acting
6		Mikhail Vedernikov (born 1975)	17 September 2018 – present	8 years, 360 days	United Russia	2018; 2023
