= Mikhail Kuznetsov (politician) =

Russian politician

- Михаил Кузнецов
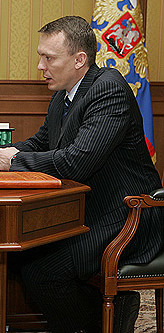
- Kuznetsov in 2006

4th Governor of Pskov Oblast
- In office 17 December 2004 – 16 February 2009
- Preceded by: Yevgeny Mikhailov
- Succeeded by: Andrey Turchak

Personal details
- Born: Mikhail Varfolomeyevich Kuznetsov; 22 August 1968 (age 58) Tyumen, RSFSR, Soviet Union
- Party: Liberal Democratic Party of Russia

Mikhail Varfolomeyevich Kuznetsov (Russian: Михаил Варфоломеевич Кузнецов; born 22 August 1968), is a Russian politician who had served as the 4th Governor of Pskov Oblast from 2004 to 2009.

== Biography ==
Mikhail Kuznetsov was born on 22 August 1968 in Tyumen.

From 1984 to 1985, he studied in Moscow at the Physics and Mathematics Boarding School No. 18 (now the Specialized Educational and Scientific Center - Boarding School named after A. N. Kolmogorov) at Moscow State University (one-year stream). He graduated from the Physics Department of Moscow State University. He served in the 242nd Training Centre for training junior airborne specialists in the area of the village of Gayzhunay, then in the Tula Airborne Division.

He worked in a number of commercial banks, including the Premier Bank. In 1993, he acted as one of the founders of MDM Bank, and a year and a half after its creation, the bank became one of the thirty largest banks in Russia. He worked as Deputy Chairman and Chairman of the Board of MDM Bank.

In 1995, Kuznetsov was elected to the State Duma on the list of the Liberal Democratic Party of Russia. From 1995 to 1999, he was Deputy Chairman of the Committee on Budget, Taxes, Banks and Finance. He took an active part in the development and adoption of the Tax and Budget Codes of Russia. He was a member of the Commission on Economics and Finance of the Interparliamentary Assembly of the CIS Member States. He was the chairman of the charitable foundation for supporting talented youth "Future of Science" in Pskov. On his initiative, the Good Deed charitable foundation was established in 2000, which provided assistance to orphans and gifted youth.

In 1999, he won the elections to the State Duma in the Pskov single-mandate constituency No. 141 as an independent candidate. He was again a member of the Committee on Budget, Taxes, Banks and Finance. In 2002-2003, he was a member of the "People's Deputy" deputy group.

Between 1997 and 2002, he worked on the implementation of the program for the socio-economic development of Pskov Oblast. As part of this program, a children's regional hospital in Pskov was built, a significant part of Velikiye Luki was supplied with gas, gas pipelines were laid to Loknya, Bezhanitsy, Ostrov, and the construction of a gas pipeline to Nevel began. In 2001, he became the chairman of the board of directors of Pskov bread-making plant.

In 2002, at the elections to the Pskov Oblast Assembly of Deputies, he headed the electoral bloc "Kuznetsov, Polozov, Savitsky — Together for the Future!" According to the voting results, the bloc took third place, gaining 15% and receiving two mandates in the regional parliament.

On 5 December 2004, in the gubernatorial elections, Kuznetsov defeated the incumbent head of the region, Yevgeny Mikhailov, who was supported by United Russia. He took office on December 17.

On 1 July 2005, Kuznetsov was included in the official register of supporters of the United Russia party. In September 2005, he headed the regional coordinating council of the party's supporters. On 2 November 2005, Kuznetsov joined the United Russia party. In the 2007 State Duma elections, he headed the regional party list.

From 29 September 2006 to 16 March 2007, he was a member of the Presidium of the State Council of Russia.

On 16 February 2009, Kuznetsov left the post of governor of Pskov Oblast at his own request.

Since 2013, he is a member of the Board of Directors of Siberian Generation Company, member of the Strategy Committee and the Audit Committee. SGK is an energy holding operating in the Altai Krai, Kemerovo Oblast, Krasnoyarsk Krai, and the Republic of Khakassia. On 30 September 2013, he was appointed General Director of SGK. He held this position until November 2018.

=== Sports ===
He was an international Master of Sports of Russia in parachuting, captain of the Sky Panthers parachute team in group acrobatics - teams of four (FS-4 in the FAI classification). From 2003 to 2010, he was a member of the Russian national team, which represented the country at all world championships. In 2004, as part of his team, for the first time in Russian history, he became the bronze medalist of the World Championship. Multiple record holder of Russia, multiple champion of Russia, multiple medalist of the European Cup, silver medalist of the 2009 World Games and two-time medalist of the World Championships.

At the 13th Russian championship in 2006 in parachute group acrobatics, the Sky Panthers team set a national record - 42 figures, thereby equating the Russian national achievement with the world one. And in August 2010, at the World Championships, the team, having completed 56 figures, set a new world record, which has not yet been broken.

=== Personal life ===
==== Family ====
He is married and has two sons and a daughter.

==== Health ====
In March 2020, he contracted COVID-19 in Switzerland; as of March 21, he was undergoing treatment in Moscow.
