= Alexander Kozlovsky (politician, born 1973) =

Russian politician

- Александр Козловский
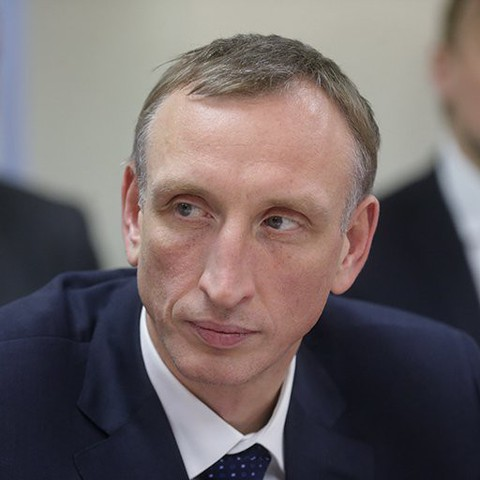

Member of the State Duma
- Incumbent
- Assumed office 5 October 2016
- Preceded by: constituency re-established
- Constituency: Pskov-at-large (No. 148)

Personal details
- Born: 5 May 1973 (age 53) Velikiye Luki, Pskov Oblast, Russian SFSR, Soviet Union
- Party: United Russia
- Education: Moscow Institute of Entrepreneurship and Law

Alexander Nikolaevich Kozlovsky (Russian: Александр Николаевич Козловский; born 5 May 1973) is a Russian politician and businessman serving as a deputy of the State Duma.

After graduating from the Moscow Institute of Entrepreneurship and Law in 1997, Kozlovsky occupied various positions as commercial directors at several industrial enterprises. He started his political career in 2010 when he was appointed deputy of the Velikiye Luki City Duma of the 4th convocation. From 2011 to 2016, he was a deputy of the Pskov Oblast Assembly of the 5th convocation. In 2016, he was elected deputy of the 7th State Duma. In 2021, he was re-elected for the 8th State Duma.

== Legislative activity ==
From 2016 to 2020, during his tenure as a deputy of the State Duma of the VII convocation, Alexander Kozlovsky co-authored several dozen legislative initiatives and amendments to draft federal laws.

== Sanctions ==
He was sanctioned by the UK government in 2022 in relation to the Russo-Ukrainian War.
