= Anatoly Dobryakov =

Russian politician

- Анатолий Добряков
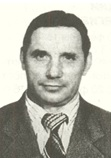

1st Head of Pskov Oblast Administration
- In office 24 October 1991 – 5 May 1992
- Preceded by: Office established
- Succeeded by: Vladislav Tumanov

Personal details
- Born: 23 February 1939 Bogoslovo, Pestovsky District, Leningrad Oblast, RSFSR, Soviet Union (now Novgorod Oblast, Russia
- Died: 12 May 2003 (aged 64) Russia

Anatoly Alekseyevich Dobryakov (Russian: Анатолий Алексеевич Добряков; 23 February 1939 – 12 May 2003), was a Russian politician who had served as the 1st Head of Administration (governor) of Pskov Oblast from 1991 to 1992.

== Biography ==
Anatoly Dobryakov was born on 23 February 1939.

He graduated from the Borovichi Automobile and Road Technical School. From 1957 he worked as an auto mechanic, senior mechanic, engineer, chief engineer at the transport enterprises of the Kustanai region, then - the head of a number of transport enterprises in the Sverdlovsk region, and was a deputy general director of the Nizhniy Tagil industrial association of freight vehicles "Uralchimplast".

In 1988, he moved to Pskov. He headed the engineering service of the communal services department of the Pskov city executive committee of the Council of People's Deputies, and in 1989, he had become the general director of the Pskovnefteprodukt association of companies (a branch of Surgutneftegaz).

On 24 October 1991, by the Decree of the President of Russia, No. 154, Dobyrakov was appointed the 1st Governor (Head) of the Pskov Oblast.

On 5 May 1992, Dobryakov was removed from office, and Vladislav Tumanov was appointed in his place.

He died on 12 May 2003.
