= Elena Nefedeva =

Elena Nefedeva (born August 1870, in Halahalnya, Russian Empire) was a Russian Greco-Roman Catholic nun.

== Biography ==
Nefedeva was born in August 1870 in a Lutheran peasant family in the Halahalnya village, Pskov Oblast. She graduated from high school in Pskov. She married a court counselor. After the death of her husband she moved to Petrograd, where she was arrested on 26 September 1918, and released on 2 October.

In late 1921, Nefedeva adopted Eastern Catholicism and became a parishioner of the Greek Catholic parish of the Holy Spirit. In 1922 she joined a Catholic monastic community. On 5 December 1923 she was arrested and, on 19 May 1922, she was sentenced under Art. 61 Criminal Code of the Russian Federation to five years in a concentration camp.

In 1930, she was released and sent to live three years in Saratov. In 1933, she returned to Leningrad and worked in a tuberculosis clinic. Nefedeva was arrested again on 16 September 1935 on charges of participating in a counterrevolutionary organization. On 7 February 1936, she was sentenced under Article 58-10 of the Criminal Code of the RSFSR to three years' exile, and sent to Kargopol Arkhangelsk region. Her subsequent fate is unknown.

== See also ==
- Catholic Church in Russia
