= 2017 Severodvinsk Council of Deputies election =

Local election in Russia

Elections to the city Council of Deputies of the municipality "Severodvinsk" of the VI convocation
- September 10, 2017

25 13 seats needed for a majority
- Turnout: 11.53 %
	First party	Second party	Third party
Party	United Russia	LDPR	CPRF
Seats before	18	1	4
Seats won	20	2	1
Seat change	▲2	▲1	▼3
Percentage	52.79	12.64	12.23
	Fourth party	Fifth party	Sixth party
Party	A Just Russia	Rodina	Yabloko
Seats before	2	1	0
Seats won	2	0	0
Seat change	0	▼1	0
Percentage	9.49	0.52	0.11
	Seventh party	Eighth party
Party	Nonpartisans	Against the only candidate
Seats before	0	-
Seats won	0	-
Seat change	0	-
Percentage	6.63
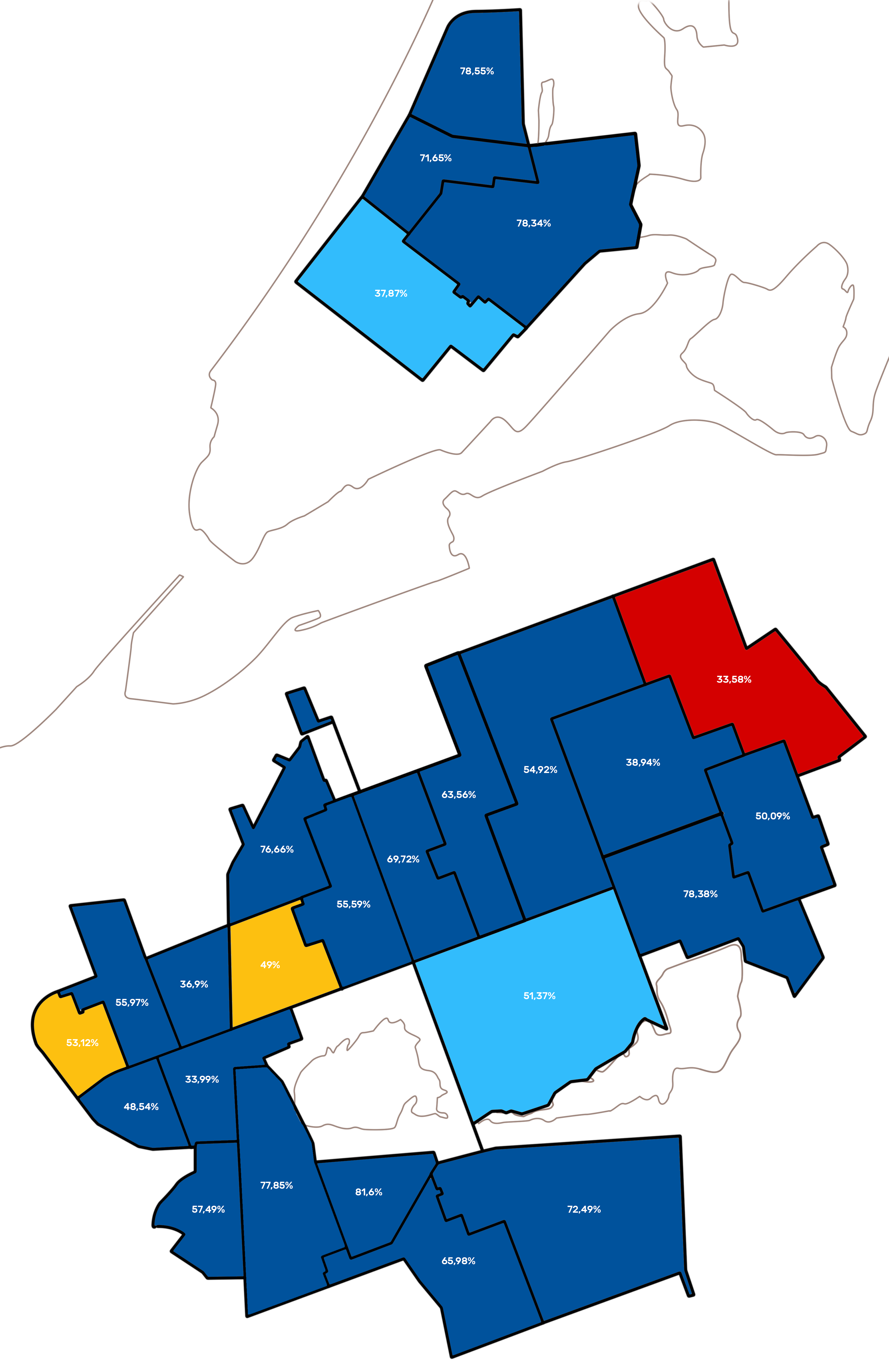
- Winners by district: United Russia LDPR A Just Russia CPRF

Elections to the Council of Deputies of the city of Severodvinsk of the VI convocation were held on September 10, 2017, in Severodvinsk, Arkhangelskaya oblast.

Unlike the previous elections, when half (13 deputies of the Council) of the Council had been elected by the plurality voting, and the other half (also 13 deputies) were elected by party-list voting, in the 2017 elections all the 25 deputies were elected by the plurality voting, one from each of the 25 city electoral districts. The total number of deputies in the Council of Deputies also has changed and decreased by 1.

== Pre-election period and elections ==
On May 23, 2017, the United Russia primaries took place at the Drama Theater, and on August 12, the campaign period began throughout the Arkhangelsk oblast.

Candidates from United Russia party were nominated in each electoral district, and in three districts they were the only candidates to vote for (the alternative voting option was only the line "Against"). Candidates from the Liberal Democratic Party were nominated in 20 districts, in 12 districts candidates from the Communist Party of the Russian Federation were nominated, in 9 districts candidates from A Just Russia party were nominated. In the 5th district the only candidate from Rodina party was nominated, and in the 19th – from Yabloko democratic party. During the elections, according to the news agency "Belomorkanal", one candidate brought people to the polling station at school №9. The head of the city, Igor Skubenko, who had been elected three days earlier, voted at school №13, in which the leaking roof was disguised under a flower bed.

The elections were guarded by the police, which presence at polling stations was estimated at up to 1.5 thousand throughout the region. By 2 pm there were several arrests in Severodvinsk because of the campaign (the campaign period had ended up on September 8).

== Results ==
The turnout was only 11.53%. From 15 to 17 million rubles were spent on organizing the electoral process.

As a result of the elections, having received 20 out of 25 seats, United Russia party has increased its presence in the city parliament by 2 seats. The Liberal Democratic Party of Russia and A Just Russia each got 2 seats, and the Communist Party of the Russian Federation got only one seat. Unlike the previous elections, the Rodina party haven’t received any seat.

In 2019, due to the resignation by the deputy Vladimir Sukharev, who had won in the 1st district (on the island of Yagry), by-elections were held. In them the Shies activist and a member of the unregistered party "Other Russia" Valery Sheptukhin took part, and the candidate from the Liberal Democratic party Sergey Popov won.

Party	Votes	%	Seats	+/–
United Russia	9,077	54.54	20	+2
Liberal Democratic Party of Russia	2,173	13.06	2	+1
Communist Party of the Russian Federation	2,103	12.64	1	–3
A Just Russia	1,631	9.80	2	0
Rodina	90	0.54	0	–1
Yabloko	19	0.11	0	0
Independents	1,140	6.85	0	0
Against all	410	2.46	–	–
Total	16,643	100.00	25	–1
Valid votes	16,643	96.80		
Invalid/blank votes	550	3.20		
Total votes	17,193	100.00		
Registered voters/turnout	149,733	11.48		
