= Yevgeny Mikhailov =

Russian politician (born 1963)

- Евгений Михайлов
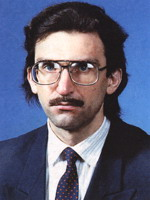

Chief Executive Officer of the Council of Ministers of the DNR
- In office 29 July 2014 – 4 November 2014
- Preceded by: Boris Litvinov
- Succeeded by: Natalya Kuchmistaya (acting)

Assistant to the Kremlin Chief of Staff
- In office March 2006 – June 2012

3rd Governor of Pskov Oblast
- In office 10 November 1996 – 17 December 2004
- Preceded by: Vladislav Tumanov
- Succeeded by: Mikhail Kuznetsov

Member of the Federation Council
- In office 4 December 1996 – 21 December 2000

Member of the State Duma
- In office 12 December 1993 – 4 December 1996

Deputy of the Moscow City Council
- In office March 1990 – 7 October 1993

Personal details
- Born: 17 March 1963 (age 63) Arkhangelsk, RSFSR, Soviet Union
- Party: Party of Pensioners (since 2017)
- Other political affiliations: Communist Party of the Soviet Union (1988–1991); Liberal Democratic Party of Russia (1993–1999); United Russia (2001-2016); Angry Patriots Club (since 2023)

Yevgeny Eduardovich Mikhailov (Russian: Евгений Эдуардович Михайлов; born 17 March 1963) is a Russian and Donetsk People's Republic politician.

Mikhailov was an assistant to the Chief of Staff of the Presidential Administration of Russia, and had served as the 3rd Governor of Pskov Oblast from 1996 to 2004. He had also served as the chief executive officer of the Council of Ministers of the Donetsk People's Republic between May and November 2014.

== Biography ==
Yevgeny Mikhailov was born in Arkhangelsk on 17 March 1963.

=== Education ===
He graduated from the construction technical school in the city of Velikiye Luki, Pskov Oblast in 1982 with honors. He holds the Faculty of History from the Lomonosov Moscow State University in 1991. The postgraduate had studied in the Department of Russian History, Faculty of History, from the Moscow State University in 1996.

=== Labor activity ===
He began his career as a concrete worker, and worked at the Velikie Luki plant of electrical porcelain. Mikhailov served in the Soviet Army from 1982 to 1984.

From 1984 to 1986, he was a senior technician of the architectural and construction department of the Pskovgrazhdanproekt Institute.

=== Political activity ===
From 1988 to 1991, he was a member of the Communist Party of the Soviet Union.

In 1990, Mikhailov won the elections in constituency No. 83 to the Moscow City Council, joined the Democratic Russia parliamentary bloc, and later was in opposition to the Popov-Luzhkov group. He was elected executive secretary of the commission on budgetary and financial policy, and was also a member of the commission on youth affairs.

In May 1993, Mikhailov joined the Liberal Democratic Party of Russia, and since November 1993, he was the deputy editor-in-chief of the party newspaper Zhirinovsky’s Pravda.

In December 1993, Mikhailov was elected as a member of First State Duma in the Pskov single-mandate district, was a member of the LDPR faction, and was a member of the Committee on Budget, Taxes, Banks and Finance. In December 1995, he was elected to the Second State Duma (on the list of the LDPR), retaining his membership in Committee on Budget.

Together with the deputy Aleksey Mitrofanov, he co-authored the Resolution of the State Duma adopted on 23 December 1994 on a joint meeting of the State Duma with the Supreme Soviet of Belarus, which was the first official document aimed at restoring a single state.

In the fall of 1996, Mikhailov initiated a request from a group of State Duma deputies to the Constitutional Court of Russia to verify the constitutionality of the Khasavyurt Accord signed on 31 August 1996. As a result, the agreements were declared an invalid political declaration.

=== Governorship ===
In 1996, Mikhailov ran for the post of governor of Pskov Oblast. In the first round of elections on 20 October, he took second place (22.71% of the vote), behind the incumbent governor Vladislav Tumanov (30.92% of the vote). In the second round, on 3 November, he was elected governor, gaining 56.46% of the vote (V. Tumanov - 36.89%). Mikhailov became the first governor in the history of Russia from the Liberal Democratic Party. In December 1996, as a governor, he was a member of the Federation Council, and was a member of the Committee on Budget, Tax Policy, Financial, Currency and Customs Regulation, Banking. The mandate of the State Duma deputy in December 1996 passed to Viktor Yashin.

In 1999, Mikhailov left the Liberal Democratic Party of Russia. In September 2000, he was elected chairman of the political council of the Pskov regional organization of the Unity party.

In March 2000, he was the first official to admit the death of the 6th company of the 104th paratrooper regiment and the previously killed special forces soldiers of the 2nd brigade.

On 12 November 2000, he was re-elected governor for a second term, gaining 29% of the votes cast in the elections. The successful re-election was helped by a change in political orientation (transition from the Liberal Democratic Party to Unity).

In the 2004 elections, he was the favorite candidate. In the first round of gubernatorial elections, held on November 14, he took first place, gaining 29.71% of the votes of voters who took part in the voting. His opponent, Mikhail Kuznetsov, received the support of 18.34% of the votes. In the second tour on 5 December 2004, he won 41.4% of the vote and was defeated by Kuznetsov, who gained 48.83% of the votes.

=== Recent activity ===
From March 2006 to June 2012, he was the Assistant to the Chief of Staff of the Presidential Administration of Russia.

Since July 2013, he has been elected General Director of JSC "Research Center" Construction", worked in this position until the change in the jurisdiction of the organization in December 2013.

At the end of May 2014, Mikhailov arrived in the Donetsk People's Republic in June where he became an advisor to Andrey Purgin (on a voluntary basis). On 29 July 2014, he was appointed Minister of the Council of Ministers - chief executive officer of the Council of Ministers of the unrecognized Donetsk People's Republic. During his reign, he provided the activities of the Council of Ministers, including the preparation of draft regulations. He worked in his post until November 2014.

In December 2014, Mikhailov was included in the sanctions list of the European Union, Canada, and Switzerland.

Until March 2016, he was a member of the United Russia party.

== Family ==
He is married to Elena Mikhailova and has three sons.
