= 2018 Pskov Oblast gubernatorial election =

Gubernatorial election in Pskov Oblast

- 9 September 2018
- Turnout: 195,277 (36.89%)
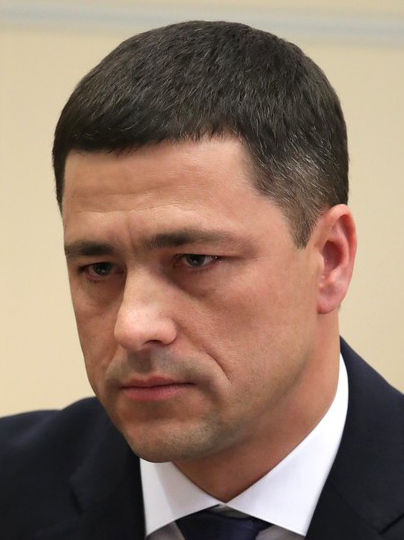
		CPRF	LDPR
Candidate	Mikhail Vedernikov	Arkady Murylyov	Anton Minakov
Party	United Russia	CPRF	LDPR
Popular vote	138,020	27,011	10,525
Percentage	70.68%	13.83%	5.39%
- Municipal results (blue – Vedernikov)
Governor before election
Mikhail Vedernikov (acting)
United Russia
Elected Governor
Mikhail Vedernikov
United Russia

The 2018 Pskov Oblast gubernatorial election was held on 9 September 2018, on common election day. To be elected, a candidate must get more than 50% of votes. Governor Mikhail Vedernikov secured a new term after winning 70.68 percent of the vote. If no one had achieved 50%, a runoff would've been held 14 days later. Only the two most successful candidates from the first round participate in the second round. The Governor will be elected for five years.

== Background ==
The previous Governor of Pskov Oblast Andrey Turchak resigned ahead of schedule on 12 October 2017, to take up the post of the General Secretary of United Russia. On the same day, Mikhail Vedernikov was appointed as acting Governor until the election.

== Candidates ==
Candidate	Party	Office
Arkady Murylyov	Communist Party	Member of the Pskov Oblast Council of Deputies
Igor Romanov	Party of Growth	Entrepreneur
Mikhail Vedernikov	United Russia	Incumbent Governor
Anton Minakov	Liberal Democratic Party	Member of the Pskov Oblast Council of Deputies
Sergei Kulakov	Party of Pensioners	Entrepreneur

== Individuals who have publicly expressed interest ==
=== Yabloko ===
- Lev Schlosberg, member of the Pskov Oblast Council of Deputies.
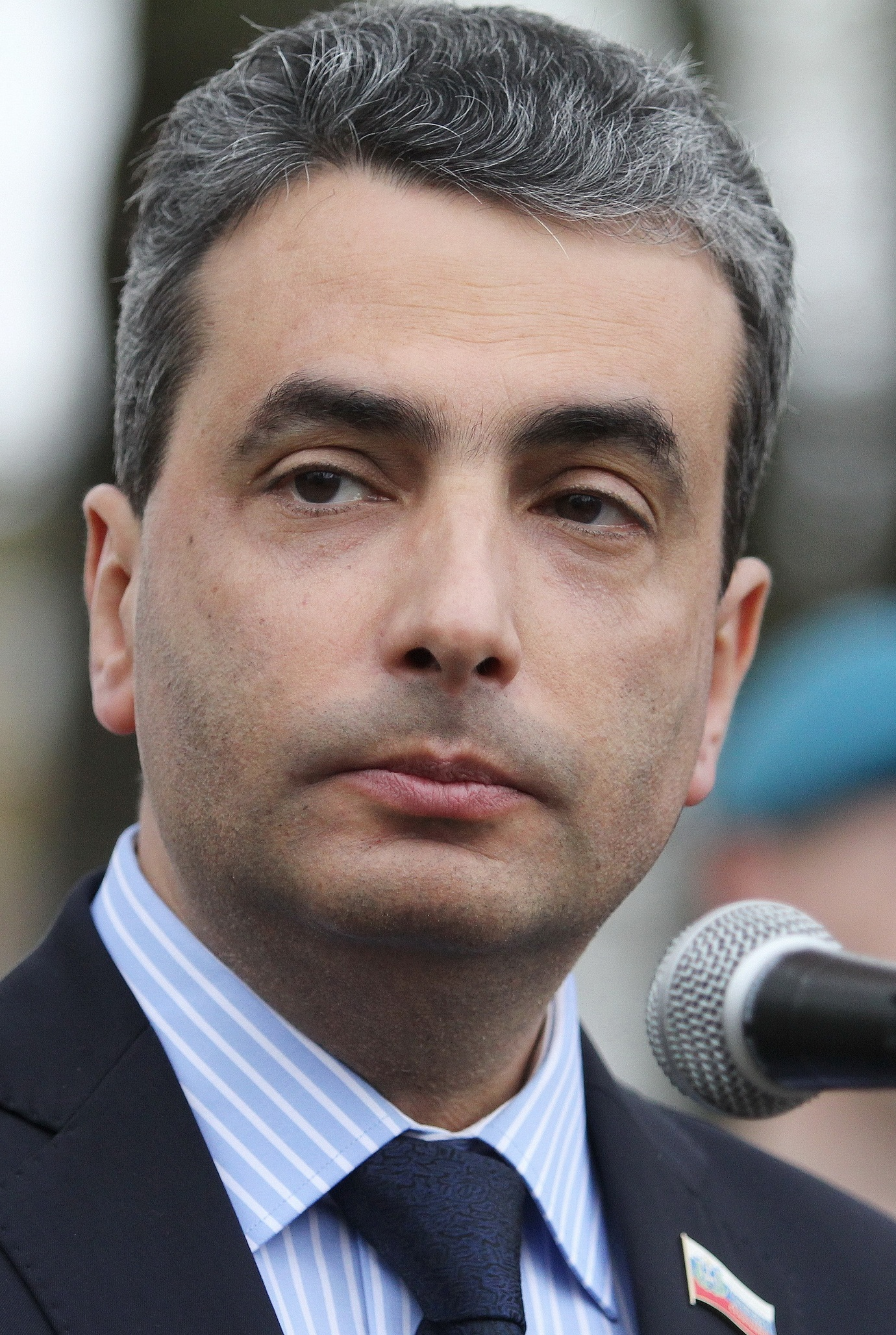
Lev Schlosberg

== Result ==
Candidate	Party		Votes	%
Mikhail Vedernikov	United Russia	UR	138,020	70.68
Arkady Murylyov	Communist Party	CPRF	27,011	13.83
Anton Minakov	Liberal Democratic Party	LDPR	10,525	5.39
Sergei Kulakov	Party of Pensioners		7,715	3.95
Igor Romanov	Party of Growth		5,296	2.71
Total			188,567	100.00
Valid votes			188,567	96.56
Blank ballots			6,710	3.44
Turnout			195,277	36.89
Registered voters			529,393	
