= Lev Shlosberg =

Russian politician, human-rights activist, and journalist

- Лев Шлосберг
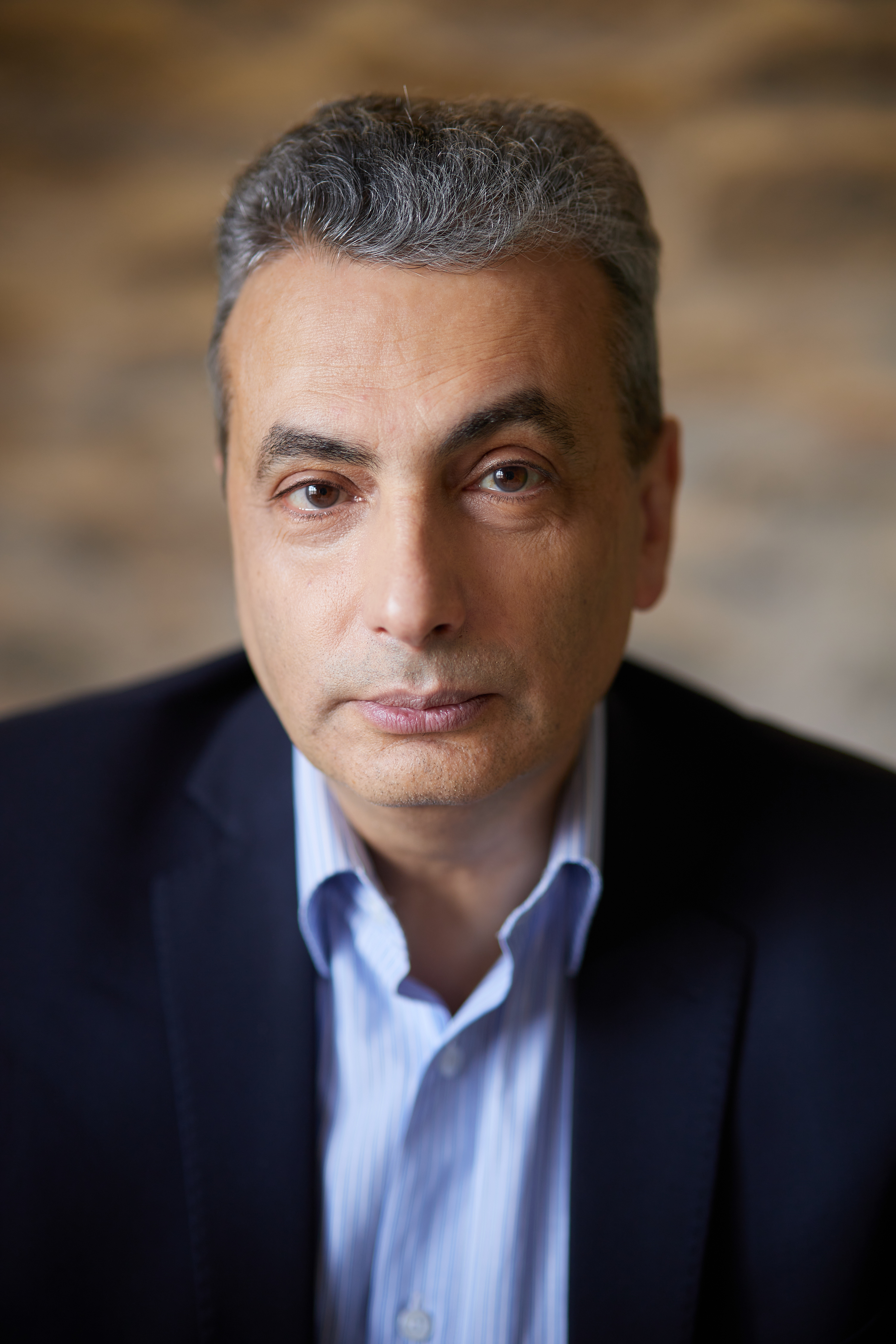
- Shlosberg in 2023

Member of the Pskov Oblast Assembly of Deputies
- In office 18 September 2016 – 30 September 2021
- In office 15 December 2011 – 24 September 2015

Personal details
- Born: 30 July 1963 (age 63) Pskov, RSFSR, Soviet Union
- Party: Yabloko
- Education: Pskov State Pedagogical University; School of Civic Education

Lev Markovich Shlosberg (Russian: Лев Маркович Шлосберг; born 30 July 1963) is a Russian opposition politician, human-rights activist, journalist, historian, political prisoner according to Memorial society, former chairman of the Pskov Oblast branch of Yabloko, and a member of the Yabloko Party's federal political committee.

== Background ==
Shlosberg is of Ashkenazi Jewish descent.

== Career ==
He joined Yabloko in 1994, becoming head of the Pskov branch of the party in 1996. From 2011 to 2015 he was a member of the Pskov Oblast Assembly of Deputies. He is irreligious.

In August 2014, the newspaper «Pskovskaya guberniya», of which Shlosberg was the director, published information about the funerals of several soldiers serving in the 76th Guards Air Assault Division, who had reportedly died in the war in Donbas. Later that month, Shlosberg was assaulted, resulting in injuries to the head and a partial loss of memory. Yabloko party leader Sergey Mitrokhin wrote that the attack was probably linked to Shlosberg's investigation on these unexplained deaths.

In 2015, Shlosberg was deprived of authority by a court and by vote of fellow deputies. Shlosberg claims this was politically motivated. That year, he ran for the post of chairman of the democratic party Yabloko. He was defeated by Emilia Slabunova in the second round.

On 4 July 2016 he announced he was running for Parliament, in that year's State Duma Election, but lost the election in his constituency, coming in fifth with around 6% of the vote. Nonetheless, that same election, Yabloko won one seat in the Pskov Oblast Assembly of Deputies, and Shlosberg returned to the legislature.

In 2021, Shlosberg decided to run in the 2021 State Duma Elections, again as a candidate of Yabloko. However this time he is running in the Khovrino constituency in Moscow, instead of his home district of Pskov.

He also ran in the simultaneous Pskov Oblast Assembly elections. On 3 August 2021 his registration as a candidate was declined, due to alleged links with banned Anti-Corruption Foundation. However, on the next day he was registered, due to the fact that the court decision to ban Anti-Corruption Foundation was not yet final. Regarding State Duma elections, however, on 9 August 2021 Moscow city court annulled his registration as a candidate, also due to alleged links with Anti-Corruption Foundation. Then he was also excluded from the federal Yabloko party list.

In April 2022, following the increased repression after the 2022 Russian invasion of Ukraine, Russian police filed charges against him and his wife for having "discredited" the Russian military.

In January 2025, Shlosberg was charged under the Russian foreign agent law and prohibited from leaving Pskov Oblast. As of March 2025 Shlosberg has been indicted and trial is upcoming.

On 10 June 2025 he was indicted on the "discreditation of the Russian military charges" (part 1 of the Article 280.3 of the Russian Criminal Code) and was placed under house arrest.

On 3 December 2025 he was indicted for the third time under different war censorship statute - "spreading false information about the Russian army (part 2 of the Article 207.3 of the Russian Criminal Code) - for a Telegram post made in February 2022 (even though the actual war censorship laws were signed into law in March of that year). On 14 August 2026 the prosecution asked for a sentence of 12 years and 1 month on charges of "discrediting" the Russian military and spreading "fake news" about it. Three days later he was sentenced to 11 years and 1 month in prison by the Pskov City Court.

On 12 November 2026, the Pskov Regional Court upheld Shlosberg's sentence.

== Electoral history ==
2011 Elections to the Pskov Oblast Assembly of Deputies
Regional Leader	Party	Seats Won	Votes	%
Yelena Bibikova	United Russia	26	113,559	37.41%
Anatoly Koposov	CPRF	9	75,192	24.77%
Mikhail Bryachak	A Just Russia	4	45,596	15.02%
Vladimir Zhirinovsky (Note: Though not from Pskov, Zhirinovsky is the leader of the Pskov chapter of LDPR.)	LDPR	3	43,003	14.17%
Lev Shlosberg	Yabloko	1	20,387	6.72%

2016 Elections to the Pskov Oblast Assembly of Deputies
Regional Leader	Party	Seats Won	Votes	%
Andrey Turchak	United Russia	33	101,189	44,14%
Aleksandr Rogov	CPRF	5	45,981	20,06%
Vladimir Zhirinovsky	LDPR	3	34,053	14,85%
Oleg Bryachak	A Just Russia	2	20,490	8,94%
Lev Shlosberg	Yabloko	1	13,964	6.09%

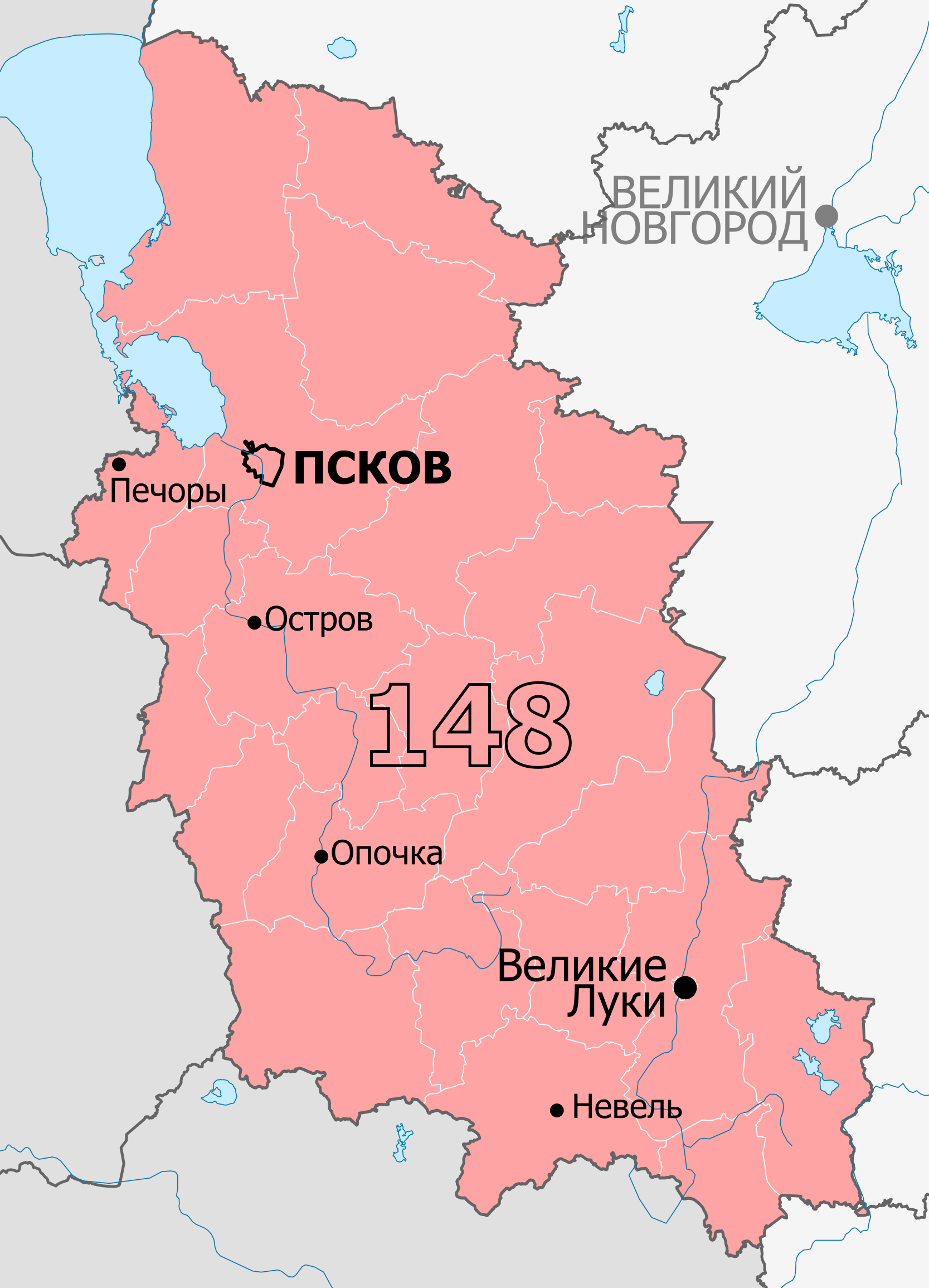
Pskov Constituency (No. 148)

2016 State Duma Election (Pskov Constituency)
Candidate	Party	Votes	%
Aleksandr Kozlovsky	United Russia	94,372	40.88%
Aleksandr Rogov	CPRF	33,472	14.5%
Oleg Bryachak	A Just Russia	28,819	12.48%
Anton Minakov	LDPR	21,463	9.3%
Lev Shlosberg	Yabloko	13,669	5.92%
Vyacheslav Evdokimenko	CR	11,701	5.07%
Mikhail Khoronen	Patriots	6,415	2.78%
Konstantin Vilkov	Rodina	3,636	1.57%
Anna Galkina	Civic Platform	2,886	1.25%
Vasiliy Krasnov	Party of Growth	2,805	1.22%
Remm Malishkov	Greens	2,015	0.87%
Buisultan Khamzaev	GS	1,222	0.53%
Invalid Votes		8,378	3.63%
