= 2017 Russian elections =

Elections in Russia

Russian Election Day, 2017
← 2016	10 September 2017	2018 →
- Gubernatorial Legislative Gubernatorial and legislative

Election Day was held on September 10, 2017. 82 out of 85 of Russia's regions took part in the voting. Only in Saint Petersburg, Republic of Ingushetia and Magadan Oblast no elections took place.

== Overview ==
Type of election	Quantity of federal subjects
Election to the State Duma	2
Mayoral election	1
Regional legislative election	6
Gubernatorial election	17 (16 direct, 1 by local parliament)

== Elections to the State Duma ==
- 2017 Bryansk by-election in the Bryansk Oblast
- 2017 Kingisepp by-election in the Leningrad Oblast

== Mayoral elections ==
- Yakutsk

== Regional legislative elections ==
- Krasnodar Krai
- North Ossetia–Alania
- Penza Oblast
- Sakhalin Oblast
- Saratov Oblast
- Udmurtia

== Gubernatorial elections ==
Sixteen federal subjects will have direct elections of governors, and in Adygeya, the governor will be elected by the local parliament.

- Adygea
- Belgorod Oblast
- Kaliningrad Oblast
- Kirov Oblast
- Mari El Republic
- Novgorod Oblast
- Perm Krai
- Republic of Buryatia
- Republic of Karelia
- Republic of Mordovia
- Ryazan Oblast
- Saratov Oblast
- Sevastopol^{1}
- Sverdlovsk Oblast
- Tomsk Oblast
- Udmurt Republic
- Yaroslavl Oblast

^{1} Internationally recognised as part of Ukraine, see political status of Crimea and annexation of Crimea by the Russian Federation for details

== Representative bodies ==
- 2017 Moscow municipal elections
- 2017 Severodvinsk Council of Deputies election
