= List of chairmen of Pskov Oblast Assembly of Deputies =

The Chairman of Pskov Oblast Duma is the presiding officer of the Pskov Oblast Assembly of Deputies.

== Office-holders ==
| Name | Took office | Left office |
|---|---|---|
| Yury Shmatov | 1994 | 2004 |
| Boris Polozov | 2005 | 2011 |
| Aleksandr Kotov | 2011 | Present |
