= 2016 Russian elections =

Russian Election Day, 2016
← 2015	18 September 2016	2017 →
- Gubernatorial Gubernatorial and legislative Legislative Parliamentary elections of another subject

Election Day in Russia was 18 September 2016. Among them were the legislative election for the 7th State Duma, nine gubernatorial elections, 39 regional parliamentary elections, and many elections on the municipal and local level.

== State Duma ==
All 450 seats of the State Duma were up for re-election on 18 September.

Party	Party-list			Constituency			Total seats	+/–
Party	Votes	%	Seats	Votes	%	Seats	Total seats	+/–
United Russia	28,527,828	55.23	140	25,162,770	50.12	203	343	+105
Communist Party	7,019,752	13.59	35	6,492,145	12.93	7	42	−50
Liberal Democratic Party	6,917,063	13.39	34	5,064,794	10.09	5	39	−17
A Just Russia	3,275,053	6.34	16	5,017,645	10.00	7	23	−41
Communists of Russia	1,192,595	2.31	0	1,847,824	3.68	0	0	New
Yabloko	1,051,335	2.04	0	1,323,793	2.64	0	0	0
Russian Party of Pensioners for Justice	910,848	1.76	0				0	New
Rodina	792,226	1.53	0	1,241,642	2.47	1	1	New
Party of Growth	679,030	1.31	0	1,171,259	2.33	0	0	0
The Greens	399,429	0.77	0	770,076	1.53	0	0	New
People's Freedom Party	384,675	0.74	0	530,862	1.06	0	0	New
Patriots of Russia	310,015	0.60	0	704,197	1.40	0	0	0
Civic Platform	115,433	0.22	0	364,100	0.73	1	1	New
Civilian Power	73,971	0.14	0	79,922	0.16	0	0	New
Independents				429,051	0.85	1	1	+1
Total	51,649,253	100.00	225	50,200,080	100.00	225	450	0
Valid votes	51,649,253	98.13		50,200,080	96.60			
Invalid/blank votes	982,596	1.87		1,767,725	3.40			
Total votes	52,631,849	100.00		51,967,805	100.00			
Registered voters/turnout	110,061,200	47.82		109,636,794	47.40			
Source: Central Election Commission

== Gubernatorial elections ==
- Republic of Komi
- Tula Oblast
- Zabaykalsky Krai
- Tver Oblast
- Republic of Chechnya
- Ulyanovsk Oblast
- Republic of Tuva
- Republic of North Ossetia
- Republic of Karachay Cherkessia

== Regional legislative elections ==
- Republic of Adygea
- Republic of Dagestan
- Republic of Ingushetia
- Republic of Karelia
- Republic of Mordovia
- Republic of Chechnya
- Republic of Chuvashia
- Altai Krai
- Kamchatka Krai
- Krasnoyarsk Krai
- Perm Krai
- Primorsky Krai
- Stavropol Krai
- Amur Oblast
- Astrakhan Oblast
- Vologda Oblast
- Kaliningrad Oblast
- Kirov Oblast
- Kursk Oblast
- Leningrad Oblast
- Lipetsk Oblast
- Moscow Oblast
- Murmansk Oblast
- Nizhny Novgorod Oblast
- Novgorod Oblast
- Omsk Oblast
- Orenburg Oblast
- Oryol Oblast
- Pskov Oblast
- Samara Oblast
- Sverdlovsk Oblast
- Tambov Oblast
- Tver Oblast
- Tomsk Oblast
- Tyumen Oblast
- Saint Petersburg
- Jewish Autonomous Oblast
- Khanty-Mansi Autonomous Okrug
- Chukotka Autonomous Okrug

== Mayoral elections in regional capitals ==
- Kemerovo

== Local self-government elections in regional capitals ==
- Ufa
- Nalchik
- Petrozavodsk
- Saransk
- Grozny
- Perm
- Stavropol
- Kaliningrad
- Kemerovo
- Saratov
- Khanty-Mansiysk

== Other local elections ==
On election day in 2016 there were more than five thousand other elections of heads of municipalities and for local municipal councils of deputies in cities across the country, along with 148 local referendums.
