= Mikhail Vedernikov =

Russian politician (born 1975)

- Михаил Ведерников
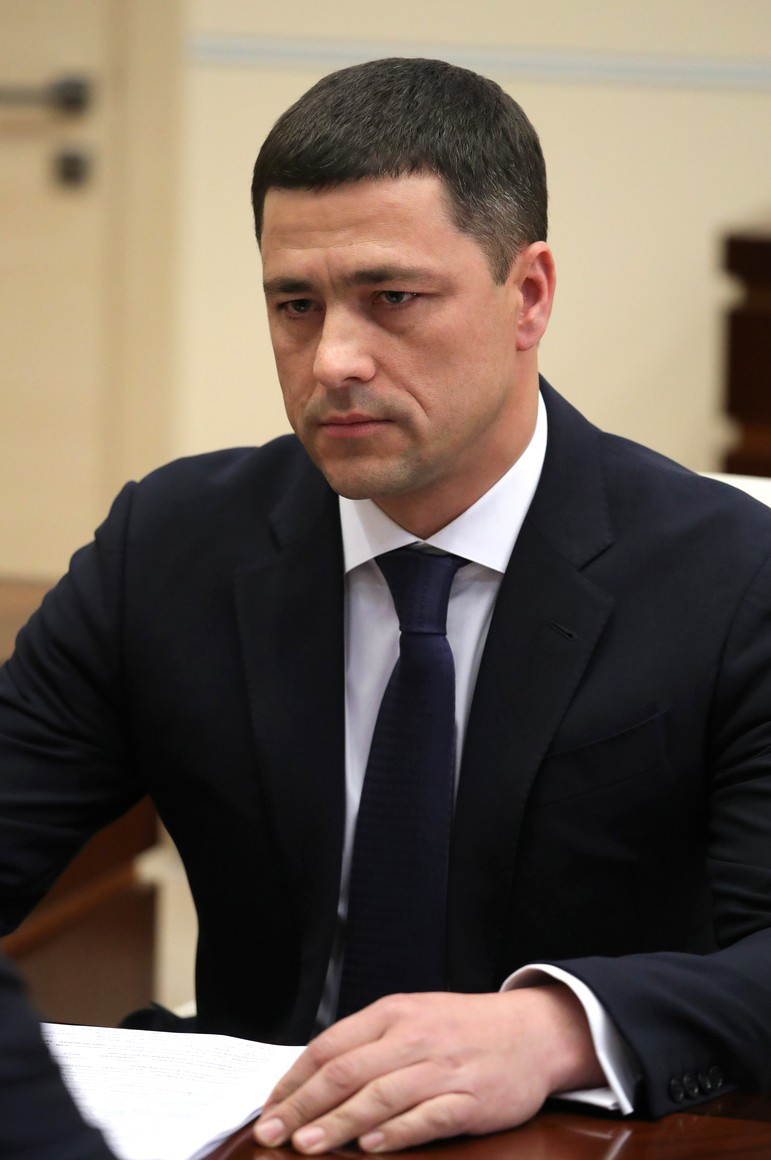
- Vedernikov in 2018

6th Governor of Pskov Oblast
- Incumbent
- Assumed office 17 September 2018
- Preceded by: Andrey Turchak

Personal details
- Born: 7 March 1978 (age 48) Vyborg, Leningrad Oblast, RSFSR, Soviet Union

Mikhail Yuryevich Vedernikov

(Russian: Михаил Юрьевич Ведерников; born 7 March 1978) is a Russian politician and the governor of Pskov Oblast since 2017.

== Biography ==
Mikhail Vedernikov was born in 1978 in Vyborg, Leningrad Oblast. In 1998 he graduated from the Northwestern Academy of Public Administration. In 2000 he joined Unity party and became secretary of its provincial youth organization. In 2001–2005, he was a member of Vyborgsky District council, and then member of Vyborg city council to 2009. At the time he was co-owning wholesale business and travel agency in Vyborg.

Since 2007 Vedernikov held the positions of deputy, and then first deputy head of the regional executive committee of United Russia party in Leningrad Oblast. In 2010s he worked in the regional policy department of the Presidential Administration of Russia.

On 12 October 2017, Vedernikov was appointed acting governor of Pskov Oblast, replacing Andrey Turchak. On 17 September 2018, he was sworn in as governor after gaining 70% of the vote in the election. His administration enacted a number of programs developing historical tourism and reversing decades-long depopulation in Pskov Oblast. In July 2021 Vedernikov announced his intention to run for a second term in 2023.

Mikhail Vedernikov is married, has two daughters and a son.
