= Legislative Assembly of Pskov Oblast =

Regional parliament of Pskov Oblast, Russia

Legislative Assembly of Pskov Oblast Законодательное Собрание Псковской области
- 7th legislature

Type
- Type: Unicameral

History
- Founded: 1993

Leadership
- Chairman: Aleksandr Kotov, United Russia

Structure
- Seats: 26
- Political groups: United Russia (18); CPRF (3); LDPR (1); SRZP (1); New People (1); Yabloko (1)
- Length of term: 5 years

Elections
- Voting system: Parallel voting
- Last election: 19 September 2021
- Next election: 2026

Meeting place
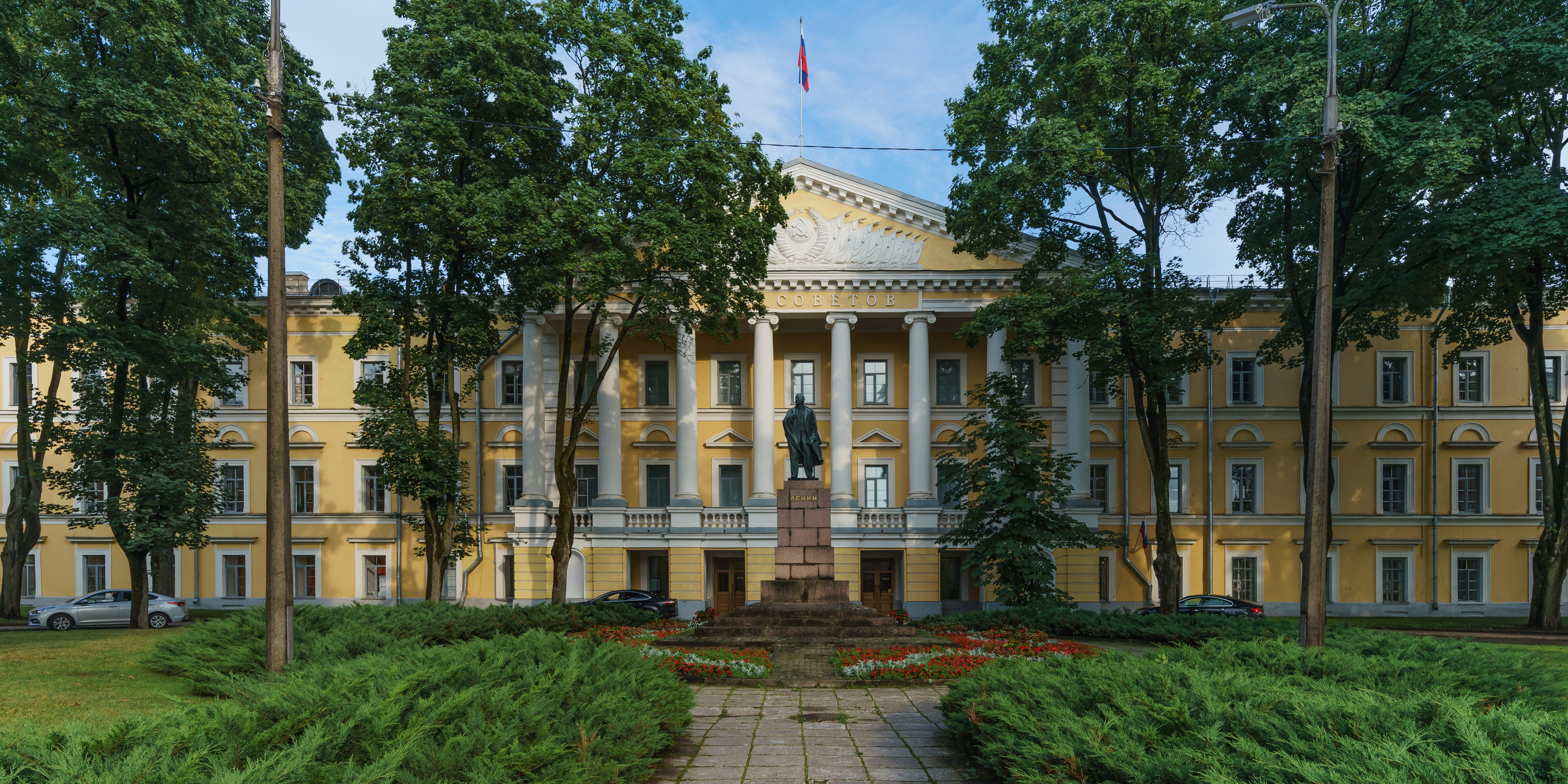
- House of Soviets, 23 Nekrasov Street, Pskov

Website
- sobranie.pskov.ru

The Legislative Assembly of Pskov Oblast (Russian: Законодательное Собрание Псковской области) is the regional parliament of Pskov Oblast, a federal subject of Russia.

The Legislative Assembly consists of 26 seats. It had previously consisted of 44 seats, prior to the 2021 elections. Deputies are elected by the citizens of Pskov Oblast. Since 2002, the Assembly of Deputies has been elected using parallel voting.

Until 2026 the Legislative Assembly of Pskov Oblast was named "Pskov Oblast Assembly of Deputies", when members of the regional parliament adopted its new name on March 26, 2026. The changes took effect on June 1, 2026.

== Elections ==
=== 2016 ===
Elections to the Pskov Oblast Assembly of Deputies were held on 18 September 2016, as part of the Russian regional elections.

Half of the seats (22) were elected through first-past-the-post and half (22) through proportional representation with a 5% electoral threshold.

2016 Elections to the Pskov Oblast Assembly of Deputies
Regional Leader	Party	Total Seats Won	Party-List Votes	%
Andrey Turchak	United Russia	33	101,189	44,14%
Aleksandr Rogov	CPRF	5	45,981	20,06%
Vladimir Zhirinovsky	LDPR	3	34,053	14,85%
Oleg Bryachak	A Just Russia	2	20,490	8,94%
Lev Schlosberg	Yabloko	1	13,964	6.09%
Mikhail Khoronen	Patriots of Russia	0	3,858	1,68%
Boris Titov	Party of Growth	0	3,405	1,49%

=== 2021 ===
Party	%	Seats
United Russia	39.61	19
Communist Party of the Russian Federation	20.74	3
A Just Russia — For Truth	9.09	1
Liberal Democratic Party of Russia	8.90	1
New People	6.22	1
Yabloko	6.20	1
Registered voters/turnout	43.63	
