= Pskov Oblast =

First-level administrative division of Russia

Pskov Oblast Псковская область (Russian)
- Oblast
- Flag Coat of arms

- Coordinates: 57°19′N 29°15′E
- Country: Russia
- Federal district: Northwestern
- Economic region: Northwestern
- Established: August 23, 1944
- Administrative center: Pskov

Government
  - Body: Legislative Assembly of Pskov Oblast
  - Governor: Mikhail Vedernikov

Area
  - Total: 55,399 km^{2} (21,390 sq mi)
  - Rank: 49th

Population (2021 census)
  - Total: 599,084
  - Estimate (2018): 636,546
  - Rank: 66th
  - Density: 10.814/km^{2} (28.008/sq mi)
  - Urban: 70.9%
  - Rural: 29.1%

GDP (nominal, 2024)
  - Total: ₽289 billion (US$3.39 billion)
  - Per capita: ₽494,040 (US$5,797.16)
- Time zone: UTC+3 (MSK)
- ISO 3166 code: RU-PSK
- License plates: 60
- OKTMO ID: 58000000
- Official languages: Russian
- Website: http://www.pskov.ru/

Pskov Oblast (Russian: Пско́вская о́бласть, romanized: Pskovskaja oblast), also referred to as Pskovshchina (Russian: Псковщина, romanized: Pskovščina) is a federal subject of Russia (an oblast), located in the west of the country. Its administrative center is the city of Pskov. As of the 2021 Census, its population was 599,084.

== Geography ==
Pskov Oblast is the westernmost federal subject of contiguous Russia (Kaliningrad Oblast, while located further to the west, is an exclave). It borders with Leningrad Oblast in the north, Novgorod Oblast in the east, Tver and Smolensk Oblasts in the southeast, Vitebsk Oblast of Belarus in the south, and with the counties of Latvia (Alūksne Municipality, Balvi Municipality, and Ludza Municipality) and Estonia (Võru County) in the west. In the northwest, Pskov Oblast is limited by Lake Peipus, which makes up most of the state border with Estonia.

The oblast is located in the Baltic Sea drainage basin, mostly in the basin of the Narva River. The biggest river of this basin is the Velikaya, which flows across the whole oblast from south to north and drains into Lake Peipus. The drainage basin of the Velikaya covers the whole territory of the oblast, with the exception of relatively minor areas in its southern, eastern, and northeastern parts. The rivers in the southeast drain into the Lovat, which has its source in Belarus and crosses Pskov Oblast from south to north, continuing to Novgorod Oblast.

The Lovat is a major tributary of Lake Ilmen and is itself in the Neva River's basin. Another tributary of Lake Ilmen is the Shelon River, which flows in the eastern part of the oblast. Finally, minor areas in the south lie in the basin of the Western Dvina. A short stretch of the Western Dvina makes up the border between Pskov and Tver Oblasts.

The north of the oblast is flat and swampy, whereas the central and the southern parts are formed by glacial landscapes. There are many lakes, especially in the south. The biggest one, after Lake Peipus, is Lake Zhizhitskoye, with an area of 51.3 square kilometers (19.8 sq mi). It is located in the southeast of the oblast, in the basin of the Western Dvina.

Wood is one of the most important natural resources in the oblast, with forests taking up to one-third of the territory. Total wood reserves as of January 1, 2005 were estimated to be at 331,200,000 cubic meters (1.170×10^{10} cu ft).

== History ==
The campaigns in the final period of the Livonian War. The solid line shows the borders of Poland around 1600, with Russia located to the east

Pskov was first mentioned in chronicles under the year 903, and several versions of the Trade route from the Varangians to the Greeks ran through its current territory, along the Velikaya and the Lovat rivers. Until the 1230s, Pskov was a principality; subsequently it was subordinated to Novgorod and became a republic, one of the two republics in Rus. In the Pskov Republic, the highest authority was the assembly of citizens. In 1348, the Treaty of Bolotovo was concluded, recognizing the independence of Pskov. Over time Pskov became dependent on the Grand Duchy of Moscow and after 1399 Moscow appointed viceroys to Pskov. Formal independence ended in 1510, when Pskov was occupied by the troops of Vasili III of Russia, the Grand Prince of Moscow. Throughout history, Pskov lands were always situated in the west of Russian Lands, and its rulers were almost constantly at war. In 1242 the Battle of the Ice on Lake Peipus stopped the expansion of the Teutonic Knights to the east. During the Livonian War, in 1581, the Polish troops laid siege to Pskov. The areas which now constitute the southern part of the oblast changed hands many times, but after the Livonian War, they were made part of Poland and remained as such until the First Partition of Poland in 1772. The southeastern part of the oblast then became part of the Principality of Toropets before it was attached to Moscow in the 15th century.

December 29 [O.S. December 18], 1708 Tsar Peter the Great issued an edict which established seven governorates. The north of the present area of Pskov Oblast, which at the time belonged to Russia, was a part of Ingermanland Governorate, which was renamed Saint Petersburg Governorate in 1710. In 1727, a separate Novgorod Governorate was established, and the area was transferred there. It was subdivided into five provinces, and the current area of Pskov Oblast was split between two of them - Pskov and Velikiye Luki Provinces. In 1772, in order to accommodate areas acquired by Russia as a result of the First Partition of Poland, Pskov Governorate with the seat in Opochka was created. It quickly proved to be unmanageable and was split in 1776 into Pskov and Polotsk Governorates. Pskov was made the administrative center of Pskov Governorate. In 1777, Pskov Governorate was transformed into Pskov Viceroyalty. In 1796, the viceroyalty was abolished, and the emperor Paul I issued a decree restoring Pskov Governorate. The southern part of Pskov Oblast wento through a number of administrative reforms, before ending up in Vitebsk Governorate. After 1919, Vitebsk Governorate was a part of Russian Soviet Federative Socialist Republic. In 1924, Vitebsk Governorate was abolished, and its northeastern part was transferred to Pskov Governorate. Besides, in 1920 the westernmost areas of the Pskov Governorate including Pechory, Izborsk, Vyshgorodok and Pytalovo that since 1918 were occupied by the North-Western Army, Latvian and Estonian republican units, were ceded from Russian SFR to Latvia and Estonia respectively under the Tartu Peace Treaty and Riga Peace Treaty.

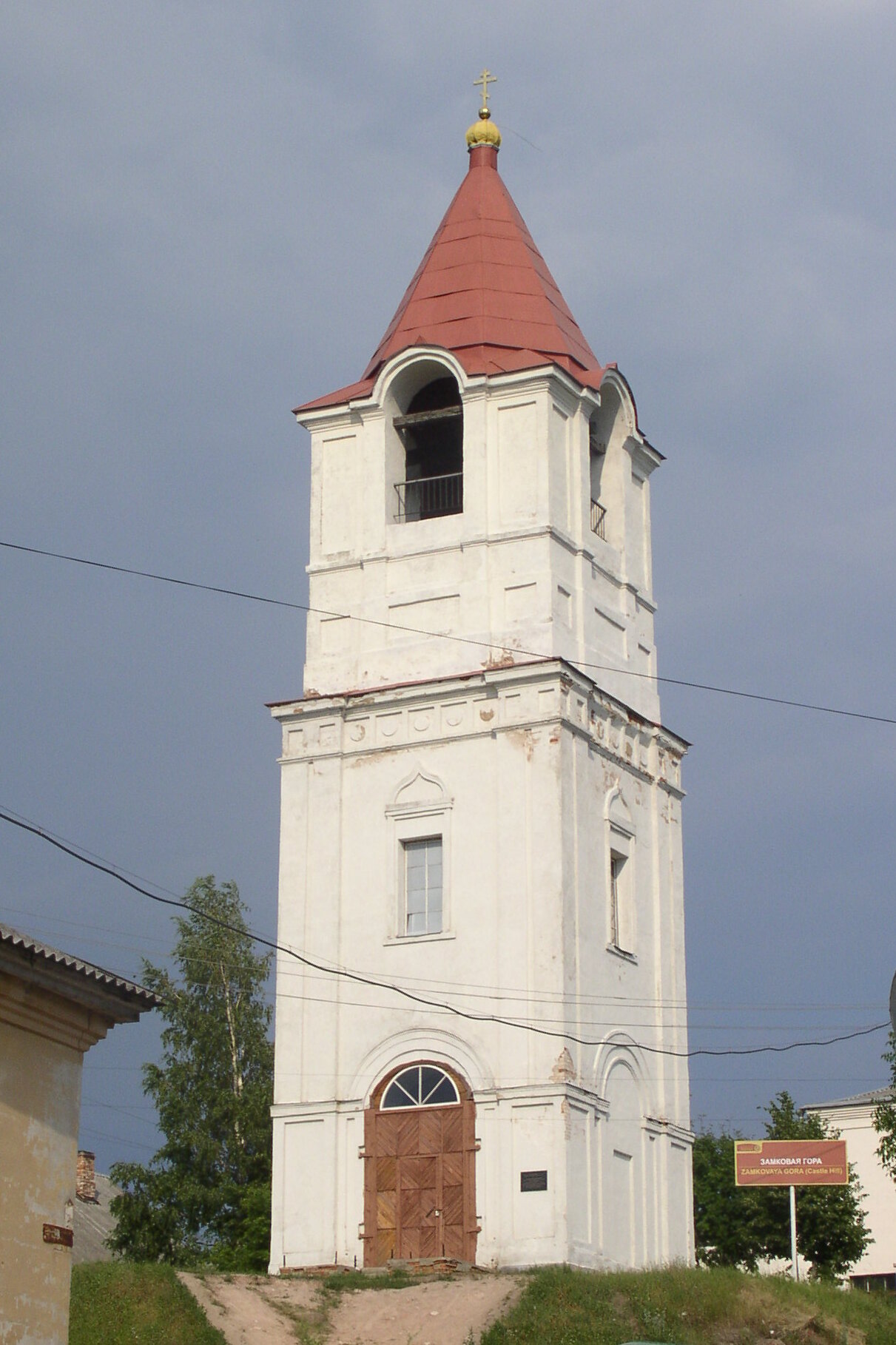
Bell tower of the Nativity Cathedral on Castle Hill in Sebezh

On August 1, 1927 the governorates were abolished, and the area became a part of newly established Leningrad Oblast. The southern part was soon split off and went through a number of administrative reforms, being at different times located in Western Oblast, Smolensk Oblast, and Kalinin Oblast. Between autumn of 1941 and spring of 1944, during World War II, the current area of Pskov Oblast was occupied by German troops. In particular, the partisan movement was pretty active in the area. After the liberation, on August 22, 1944, Velikiye Luki Oblast was established, with the center in Velikiye Luki, and on the following day, August 23, 1944, Pskov Oblast was established. In 1945, areas ceded by Russian SFR to Latvia and Estonia in 1920 were transferred back from Estonian and Latvian Soviet Socialist Republics to Pskov Oblast, including the town of Pechory. Together, Pskov and Velikiye Luki Oblasts now contained all the areas which currently constitute Pskov Oblast. On October 2, 1957, Velikiye Luki Oblast was abolished and split between Pskov and Kalinin Oblasts. After Kholmsky and Ploskoshsky Districts were transferred to Novgorod and Kalinin Oblasts, respectively, in July 1958, the borders of Pskov Oblast did not change.

In the course of 20th century the population of the Pskov oblast declined significantly and its composition changed. In 1926 almost 1.7 million people lived within the modern borders of the oblast, 92% in rural localities. By 1950 the population dropped to little more than one million due to the forced collectivisation in the 1930s, losses during the Second World War and internal migration to other areas of the Soviet Union. Further population movements and the general Russian demographic crisis of the 1990s brought the population down to less than 700 thousand. The industrialisation led to the increase of the urban population which reached 50% in 1976.

== Politics ==
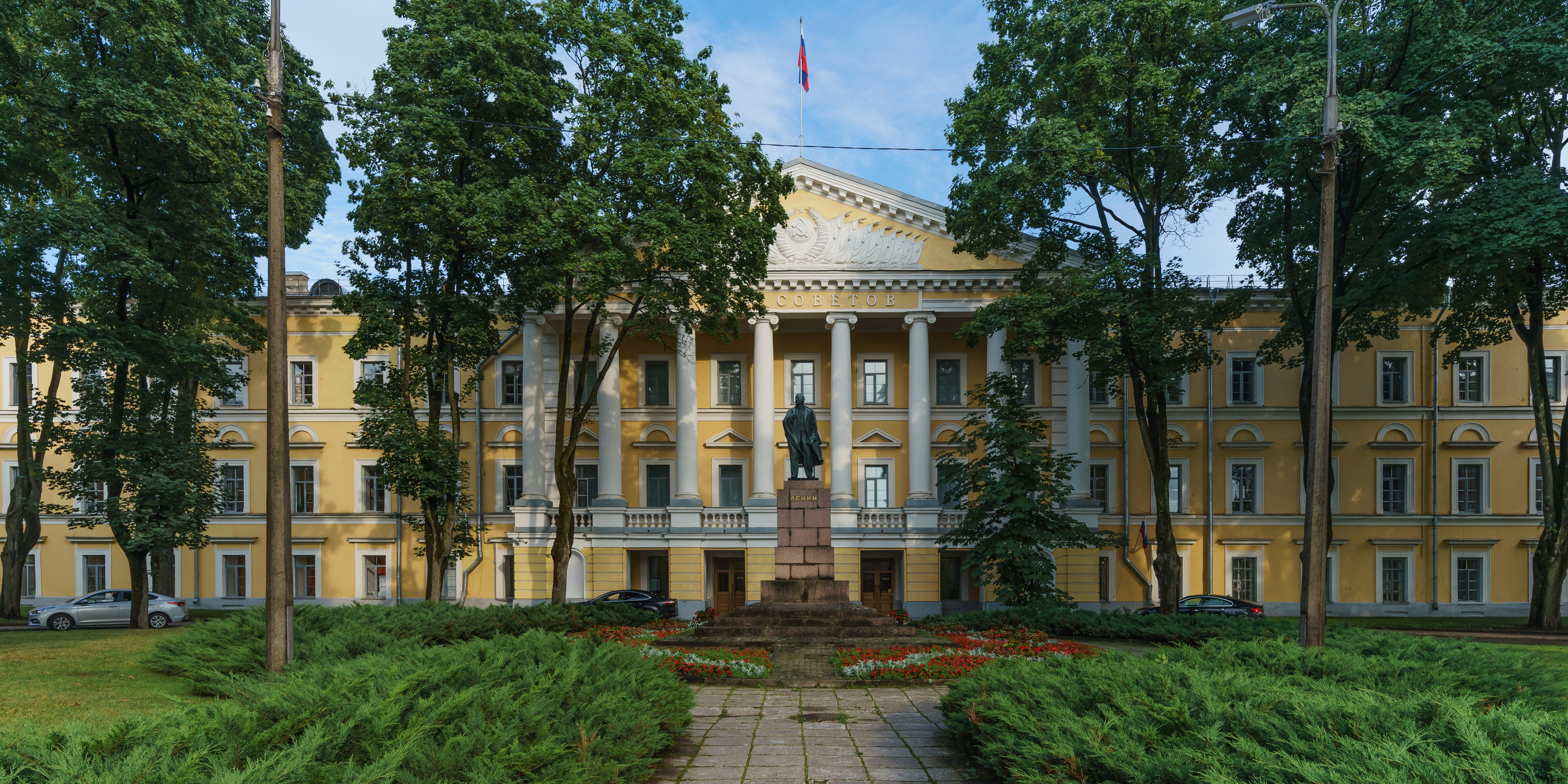
Seat of the Pskov Administration and parliament, House of the Soviets.

During the Soviet period, the high authority in the oblast was shared between three persons: the first secretary of the Pskov CPSU Committee (who in reality had the most authority), the chairman of the oblast Soviet (legislative power), and the Chairman of the oblast Executive Committee (executive power). Since 1991, CPSU lost all the power, and the head of the Oblast administration, and eventually the governor was appointed/elected alongside the elected regional parliament.

The Charter of Pskov Oblast is the fundamental law of the region. The Pskov Oblast Assembly of Deputies is the province's standing legislative (representative) body. The Assembly exercises its authority by passing laws, resolutions, and other legal acts and by supervising the implementation and observance of the laws and other legal acts passed by it. The highest executive body is the Oblast Government, which includes territorial executive bodies such as district administrations, committees, and commissions that facilitate development and run the day to day matters of the province. The Oblast administration supports the activities of the Governor who is the highest official and acts as guarantor of the observance of the oblast Charter in accordance with the Constitution of Russia.

Liya Milushkina, supporter of Alexei Navalny and former head of the regional Open Russia organisation, and her husband Artyom were convicted for sale of illegal drugs and sentenced to 10.5 and 11 years in prison respectively. They said that the drugs had been planted and the conviction was politically motivated.

=== First secretaries of the Pskov Oblast CPSU Committee ===
In the period when they were the most important authority in the oblast (1944 to 1991), the following first secretaries were appointed,

- 1944-1949 Leonty Antyufeyev
- 1949-1951 Gennady Shubin
- 1951-1961 Mikhail Kanunnikov
- 1961-1971 Ivan Gustov
- 1971-1987 Alexey Rybakov
- 1987-1988 Yury Pogorelov
- 1988-1990 Alexey Ilyin
- 1990-1991 Vladimir Nikitin

=== Governors ===
Since 1991, governors were sometimes appointed, and sometimes elected,

- 1991-1992 Anatoly Dobryakov, head of the administration, appointed
- 1992-1996 Vladislav Tumanov, head of the administration, appointed
- 1996-2004 Yevgeny Mikhailov, governor, elected
- 2004-2009 Mikhail Kuznetsov, governor, elected
- 2009-2017 Andrey Turchak, governor, appointed, elected
- 2017-present Mikhail Vedernikov, governor, elected

== Administrative structure ==
The oblast is administratively divided into two cities and towns under the oblast jurisdiction (Pskov and Velikiye Luki) and twenty-four districts. Another twelve towns have the status of the towns of district significance.

=== Restricted access ===
The areas close to Estonian-Russian and Latvian-Russian border are included into the border security zone, intended to protect the borders of Russian Federation from unwanted activity. None of towns or urban-type settlements is currently included in the border security zone. In order to visit the zone, a permit issued by the local FSB department is required.

=== Authorities ===
According to the Charter of the Pskov Oblast, state power in the region is exercised based on the separation of powers into legislative and executive branches. The state authorities of the Pskov Oblast are located in Pskov.

==== Legislature ====
The Legislative Assembly of Pskov Oblast exercises legislative power. The first convocation began work on 8 April 1994. Since 2002, it has been elected by the inhabitants of the Oblast according to a mixed system - the region was one of the first to apply such a model. Since 2007, it has consisted of 44 deputies (22 + 22): one half is elected on party lists (proportional system), the second - in single-member districts (majority system). To obtain the right to participate in the distribution of mandates to the Assembly under the proportional system, parties must overcome the 5% threshold.

The current 6th convocation was elected on 18 September 2016. The seats in the Assembly were distributed as follows: United Russia received 33 seats (in all 22 single-mandate districts and 11 on party lists), the Communist Party of the Russian Federation - 5 seats (all on party lists), the Liberal Democratic Party of Russia - 3 seats (all on party lists), A Just Russia - 2 places (all on party lists) and Yabloko - one place (on party lists). Alexander Kotov, who headed the Assembly of the fifth convocation, was again elected Chairman.

The powers of the convocation will last five years - until September 2021.

As of 1 August 2020, the seats in the Assembly are distributed as follows: 31 seats - United Russia (in 20 single-mandate constituencies and 11 on party lists), the Communist Party of the Russian Federation - 5 seats (all 5 on party lists), the Liberal Democratic Party of Russia - 3 seats (all 3 on party lists), A Just Russia - 2 seats (all 2 on party lists), and Yabloko - 2 seats (1 single-member district and 1 on party lists), one deputy - outside the faction (single-member district). The chairman of the regional Assembly of Deputies is Alexander Kotov, who headed the Assembly of the fifth convocation.

==== Executive ====
Executive power is exercised by the governor of the Pskov Oblast, who heads the administration of the Pskov Oblast and other executive authorities. The governor is the highest official in the region, elected by the region's residents for five years. The same person cannot be governor for more than two terms in a row.

Andrey Turchak was the governor from 2009 to 2017.

On 12 October 2017, by decree of the President of the Russian Federation, Mikhail Vedernikov, who previously held the position of Deputy Plenipotentiary Representative of the President of the Russian Federation in the Northwestern Federal Okrug, was appointed acting Governor of the Pskov Oblast.

On 9 September 2018, Mikhail Vedernikov was elected governor of the Pskov Oblast (he was nominated for election by the Pskov Oblast branch of the United Russia party based on the results of a preliminary intra-party vote), won the first round, gaining 70.68% of the vote, and took office on 17 September 2018.

== Demographics ==
Historical population
Year	Pop.	±%
1897	1,122,317	—
1926	1,788,418	+59.4%
1939	1,549,800	−13.3%
1959	951,866	−38.6%
1970	875,293	−8.0%
1979	850,035	−2.9%
1989	846,449	−0.4%
2002	760,810	−10.1%
2010	673,423	−11.5%
2021	599,084	−11.0%
2025	574,199	−4.2%
Source: Census data, estimate

Population: 599,084 (2021 census); 673,423 (2010 census); 760,810 (2002 census); 846,449 (1989 Soviet census).

Vital statistics for 2024:

- Births: 3,937 (6.8 per 1,000)
- Deaths: 10,157 (17.6 per 1,000)

Total fertility rate (2024):
1.29 children per woman

Life expectancy (2021):
Total — 67.69 years (male — 62.85, female — 72.67)

Ethnic composition (2010):

- 95% Russian
- 1.3% Ukrainian
- 1% Belarusians
- 0.5% Romani
- 0.4% Armenian
- 0.1% Estonian
- 1.7% others
- 24,630 people were registered from administrative databases, and could not declare an ethnicity. It is estimated that the proportion of ethnicities in this group is the same as that of the declared group.

A notable ethnic minority are the Setos, an ethnic group related to Estonians. Setos are traditionally Orthodox Christians and live in Pechorsky District in the west of the oblast.

=== Religion ===
Religion in Pskov Oblast as of 2012 (Sreda Arena Atlas)
Russian Orthodoxy	49.6%
Other Orthodox	1.5%
Old Believers	0.6%
Other Christians	5.4%
Rodnovery and other native faiths	0.8%
Spiritual but not religious	17.4%
Atheism and irreligion	19.2%
Other and undeclared	5.5%

According to a 2012 survey 49.6% of the population of Pskov Oblast adheres to the Russian Orthodox Church, 5% are unaffiliated generic Christians, 2% are Orthodox Christian believers who don't belong to any church or are members of other (non-Russian) Eastern Orthodox Churches, 1% of the population adheres to the Slavic native faith movement (Rodnovery), 1% to the Old Believers' church. In addition, 17% of the population declares to be "spiritual but not religious", 19% is atheist, and 6.4% follows other religions or did not give an answer to the question.

== Economy ==
=== Industry ===
Enterprises of electrotechnical industry and food industry in 2009 jointly produced over 50% of the industrial output of the oblast. The two cities with the biggest concentration of industrial enterprises are Pskov and Velikiye Luki.

=== Agriculture ===
The main specializations of agriculture in Pskov Oblast are cattle breeding with milk and meat production.

== Transportation ==
The railway connecting Bologoye and Pskov via Dno and Porkhov crosses the district from east to west. It continues to Pechory and across the border to Tartu, though there is no railway passenger connections between Pskov and Estonia. In Pskov, it crosses another railroad connecting Saint Petersburg with Riga via Plyussa, Ostrov, and Pytalovo. Gdov is connected by railroad with Veymarn via Slantsy. This is a part of the railway which continued south to Pskov, however, the stretch between Gdov and Pskov was destroyed during World War II and never rebuilt. In the south, the railway connecting Moscow with Riga crosses the oblast from east to west, passing through Velikiye Luki, Novosokolniki, and Sebezh. Another railway, running in the east of the oblast in the north–south direction, connects Saint Petersburg via Dno and Novosokolniki with Nevel. In Nevel it splits into two railway lines, both running southeast into Belarus: One line to Vitebsk, and another one to Grodno via Polotsk and Molodechno. Finally, Velikiye Luki is a terminus of the railway line running northeast to Bologoye.

The road network in the oblast is relatively dense, excluding depopulated swampy areas in the east of the oblast. The two most significant highways are the M9 highway which connects Moscow and Riga and runs in the east–west direction, and the M20 highway which connects Saint Petersburg and Kiev, running from north to south. The two highways cross near Pustoshka. A number of road stretches are toll roads. Ostrov is the northern terminus of the European route E262, which proceeds to Kaunas via Rēzekne and Daugavpils.

The oblast is served by airports in Pskov and Velikiye Luki. Pskov Airport (Kresty) serves regular flights to Moscow Domodedovo and Saint Petersburg Pulkovo. These flights are operated by Pskovavia, a local airline.

The very lowest part of the Velikaya is navigable.

== Culture and recreation ==
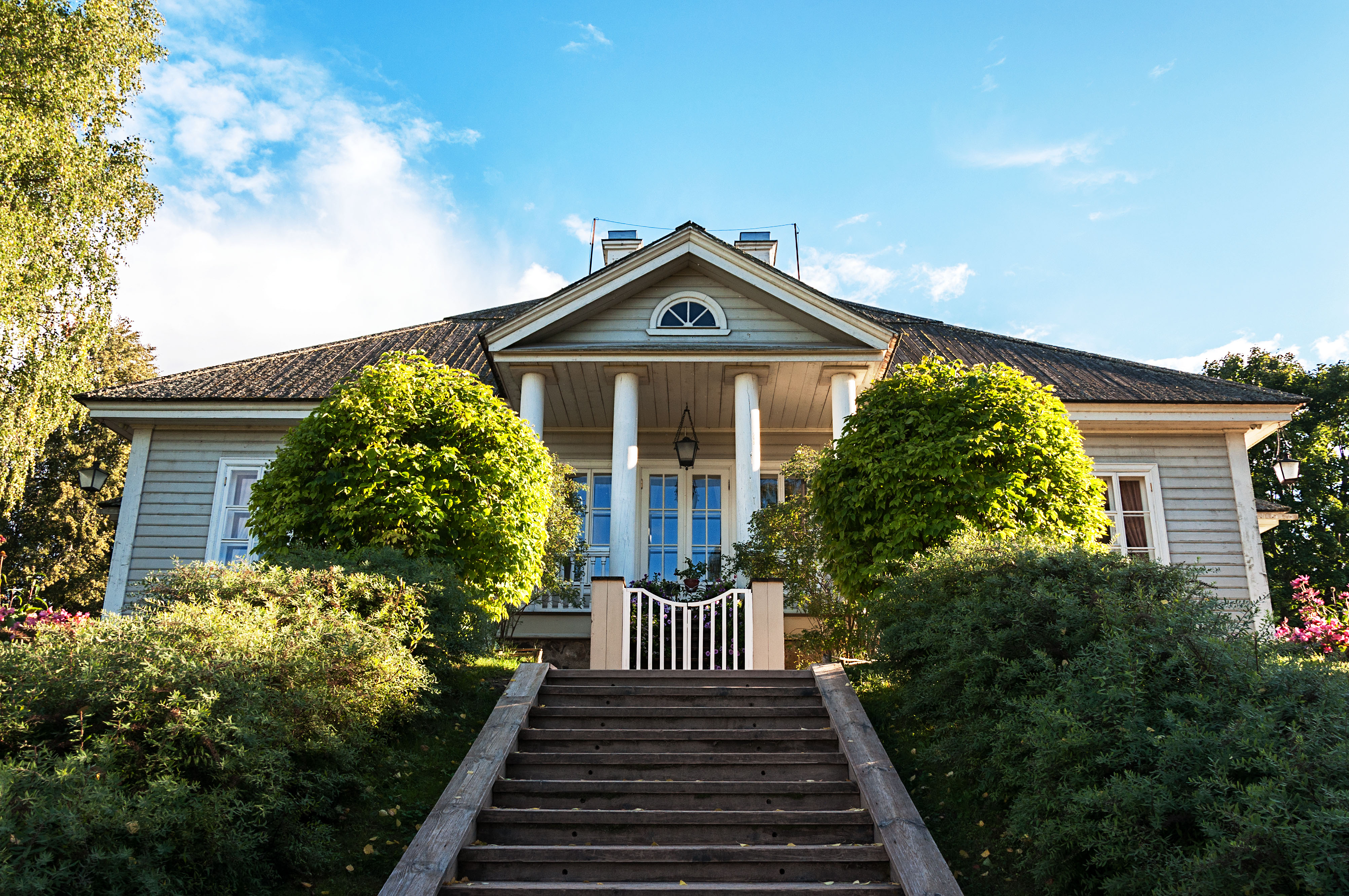
Family estate of the Russian writer and poet Alexander Pushkin

Pskov, similarly to Novgorod, avoided the Mongol invasion of Rus', and therefore it conserved the best examples of Old Russian architecture. The Christ's Transfiguration Cathedral of Mirozhsky Monastery in Pskov, built in the 12th century, contains the 12th-century frescoes, which are extremely rare in Russia. The only other pre-Mongol building in Pskov Oblast is the katholikon of the Ivanovsky Monastery in Pskov, which was constructed in the 1140s and is allegedly the oldest surviving building in the oblast. In Pskov and its immediate surroundings there are several dozens churches built between the end of the 14th and the 17th century. They all have a very simple architecture, painted white from the outside, and most of them have a belfry constructed just on the main church building. Another architecture feature of Pskov is a presence of a large number of the 17th century living houses (palatas). Pre-18th century civil architecture is extremely rare in Russia, only a handful of building survived, and Pskov contains several dozens of the best samples of this genre.

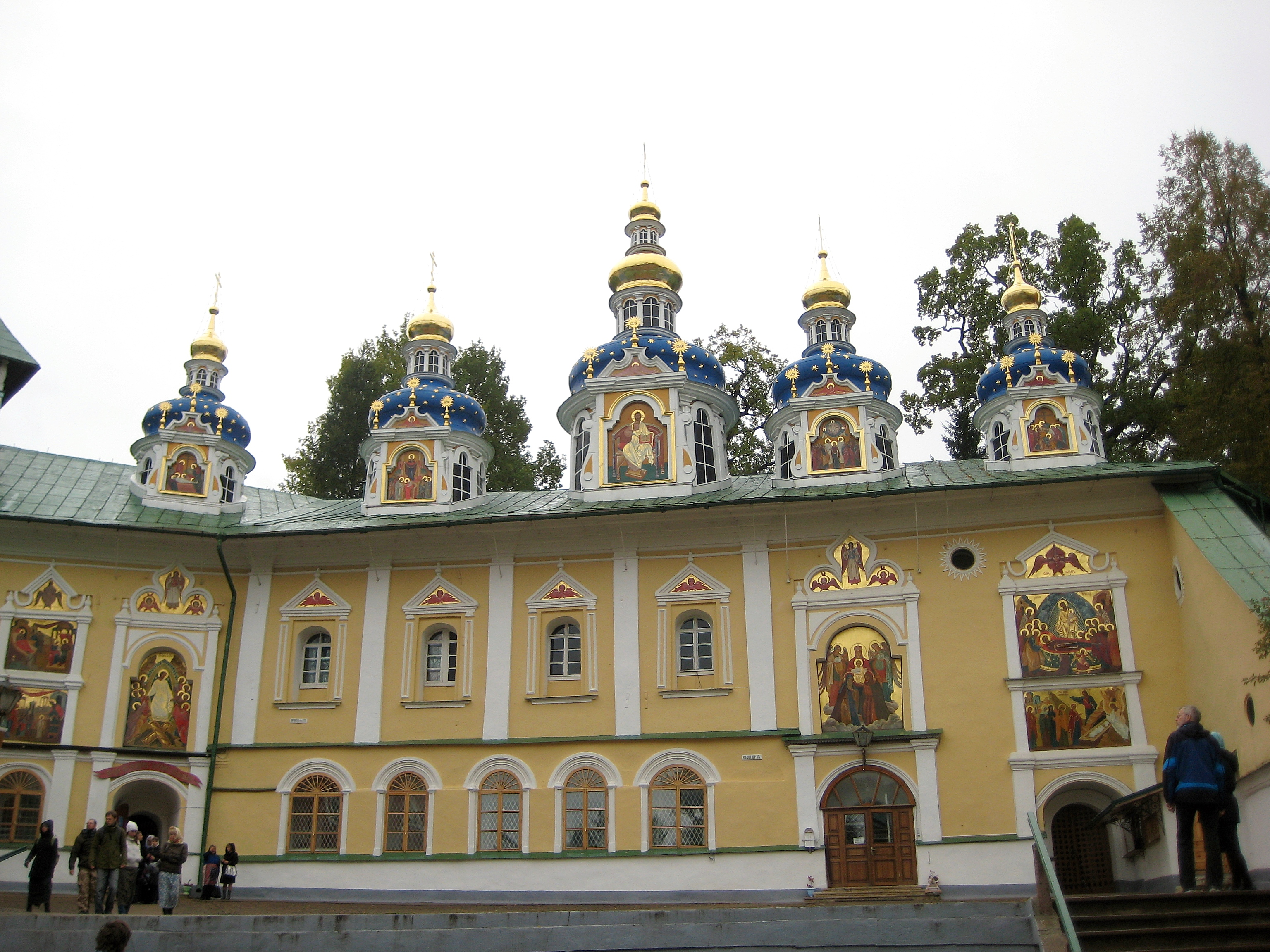
Pskov-Caves Monastery

Pskov for a considerable part of its history was located at the west border of Russia, and therefore the fortification architecture was particularly useful in the area. The best surviving examples are the Pskov Kremlin, the walls and the towers surrounding the historic center of Pskov, the fortress in Izborsk, the Pskov-Caves Monastery in the town of Pechory, and the fortress in Porkhov.

Pskov Governorate happened to be the location of the family estate of Alexander Pushkin, a Russian poet credited with the creation of contemporary Russian language. He spent considerable time at the estate, and once was banished there for two years. In Soviet times, the estate and surrounding areas were transformed into the Mikhaylovskoye Museum Reserve and became a primary tourist attraction. The estate which belonged to the family of the composer Modest Mussorgsky in Kunyinsky District is also preserved as a museum.

== Notable people ==
- Sofia Kovalievskaja (born 1850), Russian mathematician, the first woman in Europe in modern times appointed to a full professorship in mathematics, the first woman to earn a doctorate in mathematics
- Elena Niefiedieva (born 1870), Russian Catholic nun
- Princess Olga (born c. 890-925), a princess of Rus, Catholic and Orthodox saint

== See also ==
- List of Chairmen of Pskov Oblast Assembly
- List of rural localities in Pskov Oblast
- Pitelis Lake on the border with Latvia
