= Commander of the Russian Air Force =

Commanding officer of the Russian Air Force

Commander of Russian Air Force
- Командующий ВВС
- Flag of the Commander of the Russian Air Force

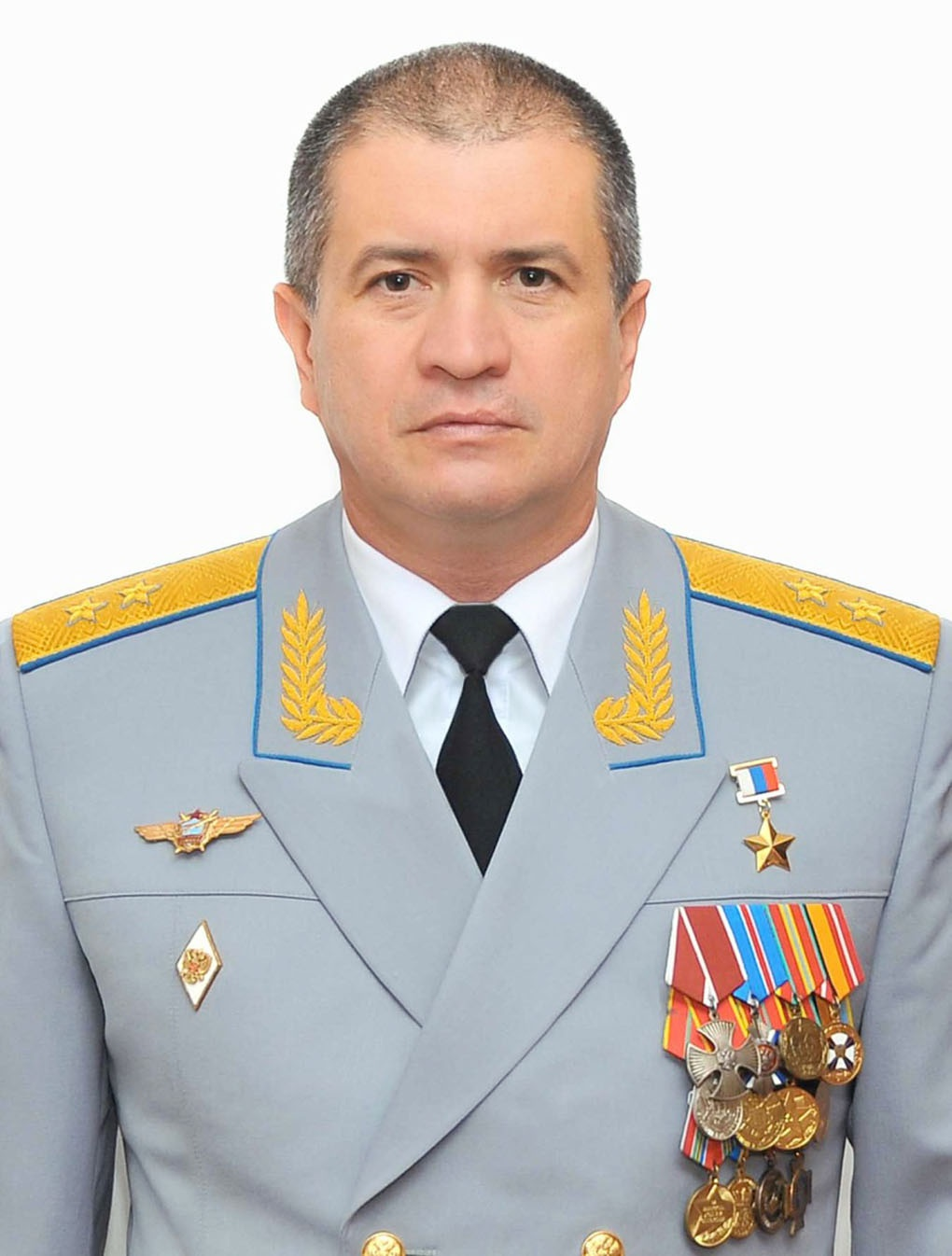
- Incumbent; Lieutenant General Sergey Kobylash since 24 July 2024
- Russian Air Force
- Member of: General Staff of the Armed Forces
- Reports to: Commander-in-Chief of the Aerospace Forces
- Appointer: President of Russia
- Formation: June 9, 1917 (historical); August 1991 (current form)

The Commander of the Russian Air Force (Russian: Командующий ВВС, romanized: Komanduyushchiy VVS) is the chief commanding authority of the Russian Air Force. Before 2015, when the former branch became an arm of the Russian Aerospace Forces, the title was Commander-in-Chief of the Russian Air Force (Russian: Главнокомандующий ВВС, romanized: Glavnokomanduyushchiy VVS). The holder of the office is appointed by the President of Russia.

The position dates to the Russian Revolution in 1917.

== List of Commanders ==
=== Chief of the Air Service of the Russian Republic ===
No.	Portrait	Chief	Took office	Left office	Time in office
1	Vyacheslav Tkachov	Lieutenant Colonel; Vyacheslav Tkachov (1885–1965)	9 June 1917	19 November 1917	5 months
2	Sergey Ulyanin	Major General; Sergey Ulyanin (1871–1921)	19 November 1917	March 1918	3 months

=== Chief of the Air Force of the Red Army ===
No.	Portrait	Chief	Took office	Left office	Time in office
1	Mikhail Solovov [ru]	Colonel; Mikhail Solovov (1879–1941)	March 1918	1 August 1918	5 months
2	Alexander Vorotnikov [ru]	Colonel; Alexander Vorotnikov (1878–1940)	1 August 1918	13 June 1919	10 months
3	Konstantin Akashev	Colonel; Konstantin Akashev (1888–1931)	March 1920	February 1921	11 months
4	Andrey Sergeyev	Colonel; Andrey Sergeyev (1893–1933)	February 1921	October 1922	1 year, 8 months
5	Andrey Znamensky [ru]	Colonel; Andrey Znamensky (1887–1943)	October 1922	July 1923	9 months
6	Arkady Rosengolts	Colonel; Arkady Rosengolts (1889–1938)	July 1923	December 1924	1 year, 5 months
7	Pyotr Baranov	Colonel; Pyotr Baranov (1892–1933)	December 1924	June 1931	6 years, 6 months
8	Yakov Alksnis	Komandarm 1st rank Yakov Alksnis (1897–1938)	June 1931	23 November 1937	6 years, 5 months
9	Aleksandr Loktionov	Aleksandr Loktionov (1893–1941)	23 November 1937	19 November 1939	1 year, 11 months
10	Yakov Smushkevich	Lieutenant General; Yakov Smushkevich (1902–1941)	19 November 1939	August 1940	8 months
11	Pavel Rychagov	Lieutenant General; Pavel Rychagov (1911–1941)	August 1940	24 June 1941	10 months
12	Pavel Zhigarev	Colonel General; Pavel Zhigarev (1900–1963)	24 June 1941	11 April 1942	9 months
13	Alexander Novikov	Chief marshal of the aviation Alexander Novikov (1900–1976)	11 April 1942	22 April 1946	4 years

=== Commander-in-Chief of the Soviet Air Force ===
No.	Portrait	Commander-in-Chief	Took office	Left office	Time in office	Ref.
1	Konstantin Vershinin	Marshal of the aviation Konstantin Vershinin (1900–1973)	1946	September 1949	2–3 years	.
2	Pavel Zhigarev	Chief marshal of the aviation Pavel Zhigarev (1900–1963)	1949	1957	7–8 years	.
3	Konstantin Vershinin	Chief marshal of the aviation Konstantin Vershinin (1900–1973)	1957	1969	11–12 years	.
4	Pavel Kutakhov	Chief marshal of the aviation Pavel Kutakhov (1914–1984)	March 1969	3 December 1984 †	15 years	.
5	Alexander Yefimov	Marshal of the aviation Alexander Yefimov (1923–2012)	3 December 1984	July 1990	5 years	.
6	Yevgeny Shaposhnikov	Colonel general Yevgeny Shaposhnikov (1942–2020)	July 1990	August 1991	1 year	

=== Commander-in-Chief of the Commonwealth of Independent States' Air Force ===
No.	Portrait	Commander-in-Chief	Took office	Left office	Time in office	Ref.
1	Pyotr Deynekin	Colonel general Pyotr Deynekin (1937–2017)	25 August 1991	19 August 1992	237 days	

=== Commander-in-Chief of the Russian Air Force ===
No.	Portrait	Commander-in-Chief	Took office	Left office	Time in office	Ref.
1	Pyotr Deynekin	Army general Pyotr Deynekin (1937–2017)	19 August 1992	22 January 1998	5 years, 156 days	
2	Anatoly Kornukov	Army general Anatoly Kornukov (1942–2014)	22 January 1998	21 January 2002	3 years, 364 days	
3	Vladimir Sergeyevich Mikhaylov	Army general Vladimir Sergeyevich Mikhaylov (born 1943)	21 January 2002	9 May 2007	5 years, 108 days	.
4	Alexander Zelin	Colonel general Alexander Zelin (born 1953)	9 May 2007	27 April 2012	4 years, 354 days	.
5	Viktor Bondarev	Colonel general Viktor Bondarev (born 1959)	6 May 2012	1 August 2015	3 years, 87 days	

=== Commander of the Air Force – Deputy Commander-in-Chief of the Aerospace Forces ===
No.	Portrait	Commander	Took office	Left office	Time in office	Ref.
1	Andrei Yudin	Lieutenant general Andrei Yudin (born 1962)	1 August 2015	c. July 2019 (Note: No official date given for Yudin leaving office. Estimated between 28 June 2019 and 9 July 2019. Dronov appointed Commander on 18 April 2019.)	3 years, 11 months	
2	Sergey Dronov	Lieutenant general Sergey Dronov (born 1962)	c. July 2019	24 July 2024	~5 years	
3	Sergey Kobylash	Lieutenant general Sergey Kobylash (born 1965)	24 July 2024	Incumbent	2 years, 1 month	
