= Anatoly Nogovitsyn =

Russian general (1952–2019)

- Born: Anatoliy Alekseyevich Nogovitsyn; 29 April 1952; Baryshevka, Semipalatinsk Oblast, Kazakh SSR, Soviet Union
- Died: 5 November 2019 (aged 67) Moscow, Russia
- Allegiance: Soviet Union (to 1991); Russia
- Branch: Soviet Air Defence Forces; Russian Air Defence Forces; Russian Air Force
- Service years: 1973–2012
- Rank: Colonel General
- Commands: 11th Air and Air Defence Forces Army
- Awards: Order of the Red Star; Order of Military Merit
- Education: Armavir Higher Military Aviation School of Pilots; Zhukov Air and Space Defence Academy; Military Academy of the General Staff of the Armed Forces of Russia

Colonel General Anatoly Alekseyevich Nogovitsyn (Note: Russian: Анатолий Алексеевич Ноговицын) (29 April 1952 – 5 November 2019) was a Russian military officer. He was the first deputy chief of the Joint Staff of the Collective Security Treaty Organization from 2010 to 2012. Before that, he was a deputy chief of the General Staff of the Russian Armed Forces from 2008 to 2010, and the deputy commander-in-chief of the Russian Air Force from 2002 to 2008.

Nogovitsyn graduated from the Armavir Higher Military Aviation School of Pilots in 1973, and had over 2,800 flight hours during his career. His awards included the title Honoured Military Pilot of the Russian Federation.

== Early life and education ==
Anatoly Alekseyevich Nogovitsyn was born on 9 April 1952 in the Kazakh SSR, Soviet Union. He graduated from the Armavir Higher Military Aviation School of Pilots in 1973. Nogovitsyn later received further education from the Zhukov Air and Space Defence Academy, graduating in 1980, and the Military Academy of the General Staff of the Armed Forces of Russia, graduating in 1994.

== Military career ==
Nogovitsyn held flying and command roles in the 10th Air Defence Army in Arkhangelsk and in the Siberian Military District before commanding an air defense corps in 1994. He had over 2,800 flight hours during his career on ten types of aircraft. In 1995, he became the first deputy commander of the 11th Air Defence Army in Khabarovsk. In 1998, after the merger of the Russian Air Defence Forces and the Russian Air Force, he became chief of staff and first deputy commander of the 11th Air and Air Defence Forces Army. Nogovitsyn became the commander of the army in September 2000. Shortly after he assumed command, Sukhoi Su-24s from the 11th Army buzzed the aircraft carrier USS Kitty Hawk in the Sea of Japan, causing an international incident.

In January 2002, he was appointed as the deputy commander-in-chief of the Russian Air Force, after Vladimir Mikhaylov became the commander-in-chief. In April 2002, the 11th Army was found by the Ministry of Defense to have a "lack of oversight for the organization of economic activities", for which he was reprimanded. In February 2003 Nogovitsyn was promoted to colonel general. In July 2008, he became a deputy chief of the General Staff of the Armed Forces of the Russian Federation. Nogovitsyn became known for being the primary spokesman of the Russian Armed Forces during Russo-Georgian War in 2008 and for warning Poland about the possibility of a nuclear strike on 15 August 2008 after an agreement reached between the United States of America and Poland on 14 August 2008 about hosting part of a US missile defense shield in Poland. President Dmitry Medvedev later played down the nuclear attack threats against Poland. In March 2010 he became first deputy chief of the Joint Staff of the Collective Security Treaty Organization. He retired from the military in May 2012.

== Personal life ==
He was on the board of directors of the Almaz-Antey Corporation.

Nogovitsyn died in Moscow on 5 November 2019.

== Awards and decorations ==
- Order of the Red Star
- Order of Military Merit
- Honoured Military Pilot of the Russian Federation

== Notes ==
Military offices
Preceded by Uruzmag Ogoyev	Commander of the 11th Air and Air Defence Forces Army; 2000–2002	Succeeded by Igor Sadofyev
Preceded by Vladimir Mikhaylov	Deputy Commander-in-Chief of the Russian Air Force; 2002–2008	Succeeded by Viktor Bondarev
Preceded by Oleg Latypov	First Deputy Chief of the Joint Staff of the CSTO; 2010–2012	Vacant Title next held by Khasan Kaloyev
