= Sergey Kobylash =

Russian air force officer (born 1965)

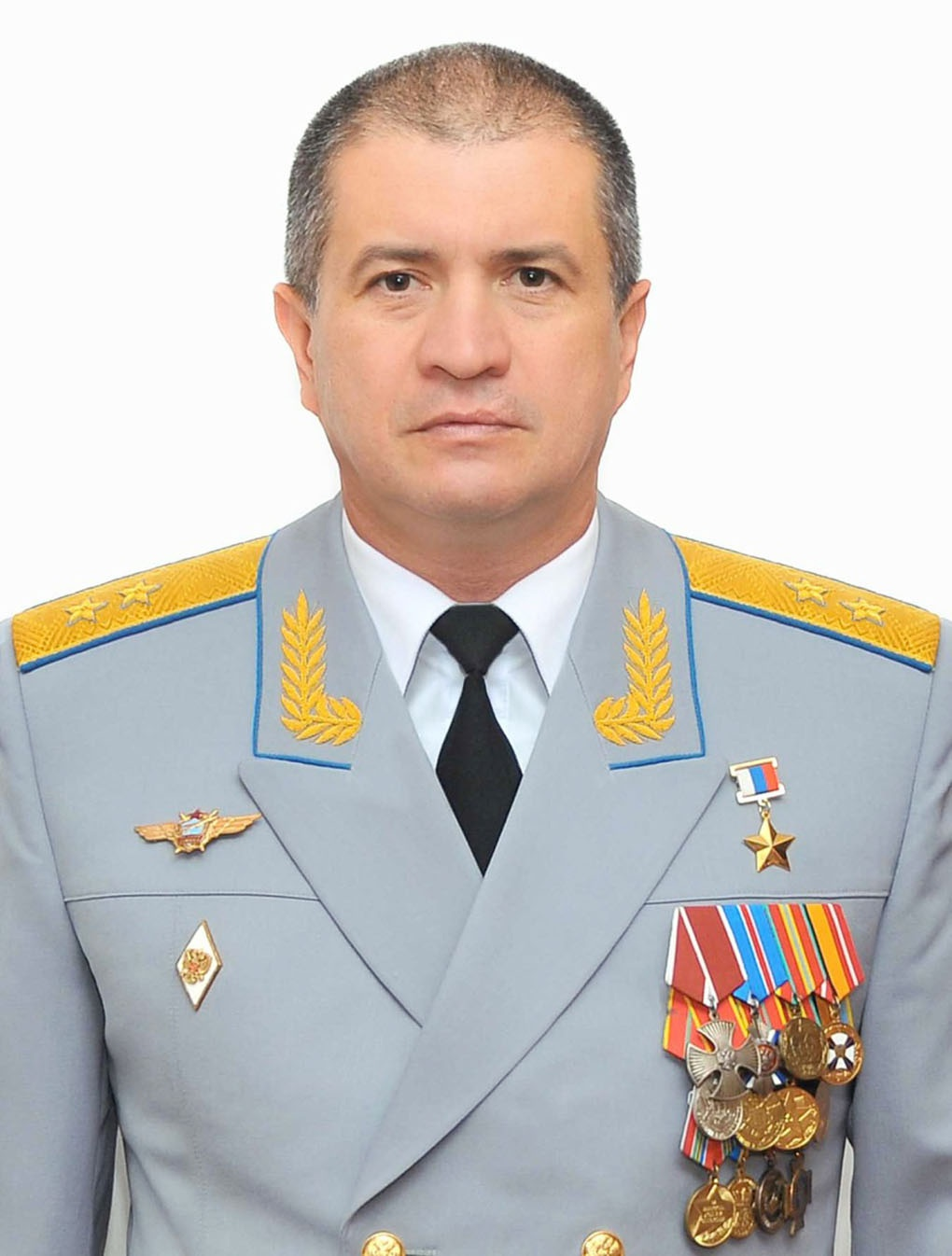
- Kobylash in 2017
- Native name: Сергей Иванович Кобылаш
- Born: 1 April 1965 (age 61); Odessa, Ukrainian SSR, Soviet Union
- Allegiance: Soviet Union; Russia
- Branch: Soviet Air Forces (until 1991); Russian Air Force (until 2015); Russian Aerospace Forces
- Rank: Lieutenant general
- Commands: Long-Range Aviation; Russian Air Force
- Conflicts: First Chechen War; Second Chechen War; Russo-Georgian War; Russo-Ukrainian War

Sergey Ivanovich Kobylash (Russian: Сергей Иванович Кобылаш; born 1 April 1965) is a Russian military officer who has been the Commander of the Russian Air Force and a Deputy Commander-in-Chief of the Russian Aerospace Forces since July 2024. Prior to that, he was the commander of Long-Range Aviation from 2016 to 2024 and Director of Aviation of the Air Force from 2013 to 2015.

He was born in Odessa, Ukrainian Soviet Socialist Republic, and began his career as a pilot in the Soviet Air Forces. Kobylash has over 1,700 flight hours and flew combat missions in the First and Second Chechen Wars and the Russo-Georgian War. During the latter conflict he was shot down twice, and each time bailed out and was retrieved by helicopter. He was made a Hero of the Russian Federation after the war. He is a graduate of the Yeysk Military Aviation Institute, the Gagarin Air Force Academy, and the General Staff Academy.

In 2024 a warrant for the arrest of Kobylash was issued by the International Criminal Court for his alleged war crimes and crimes against humanity as part of the Russian strikes against Ukrainian infrastructure (2022–present).

== Military career ==
At several times, including February 2017 and the period from July 2019 to March 2023, Kobylash has been reported as commander of the Long-Range Aviation branch of the Russian Aerospace Forces.

On 22 February 2017, media reported that Kobylash had been promoted to lieutenant general by Vladimir Putin for service rendered during the Russian intervention in the Syrian civil war.

On 12 December 2017, Kobylash awarded Tu-22M3 crews returning from deployment in Syria to Shaykovka air base near Kirov, Kaluga Oblast with the medal "Participant of the military operation in Syria".

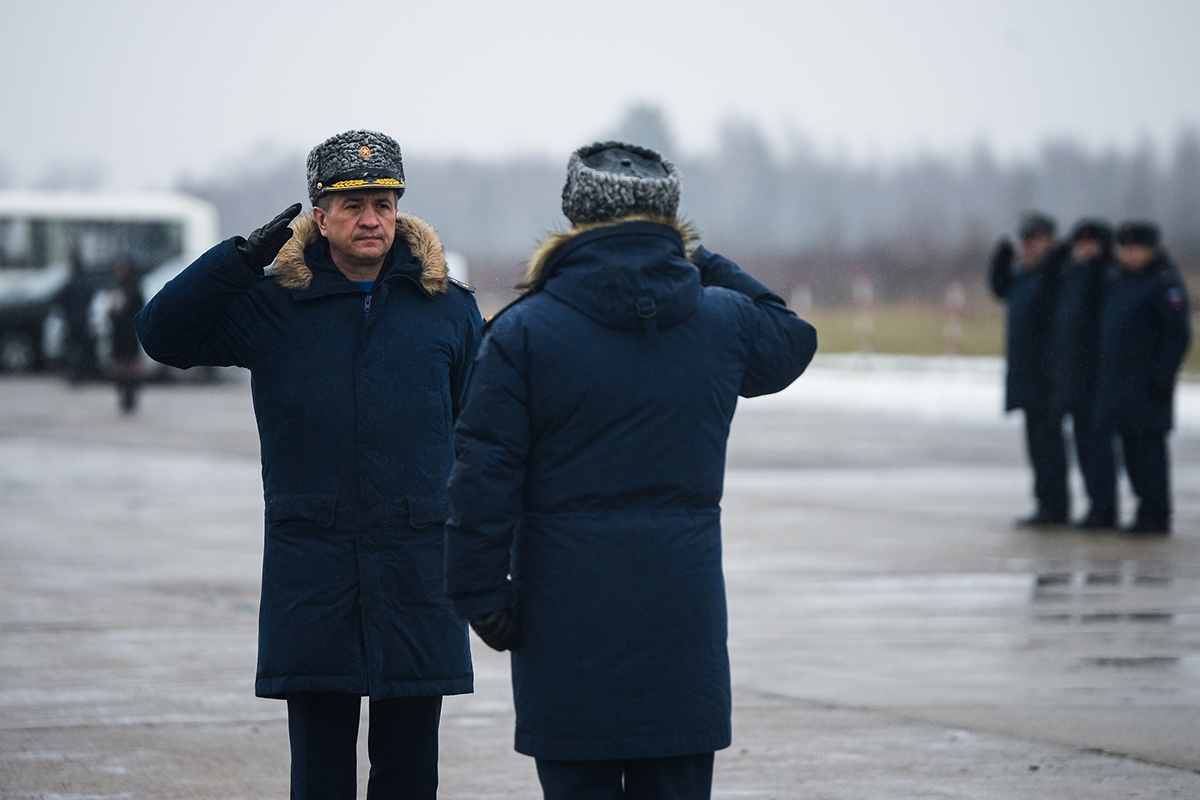
Kobylash receiving Tu-22M3 crews at Shaykovka air base after bombing missions in Syria

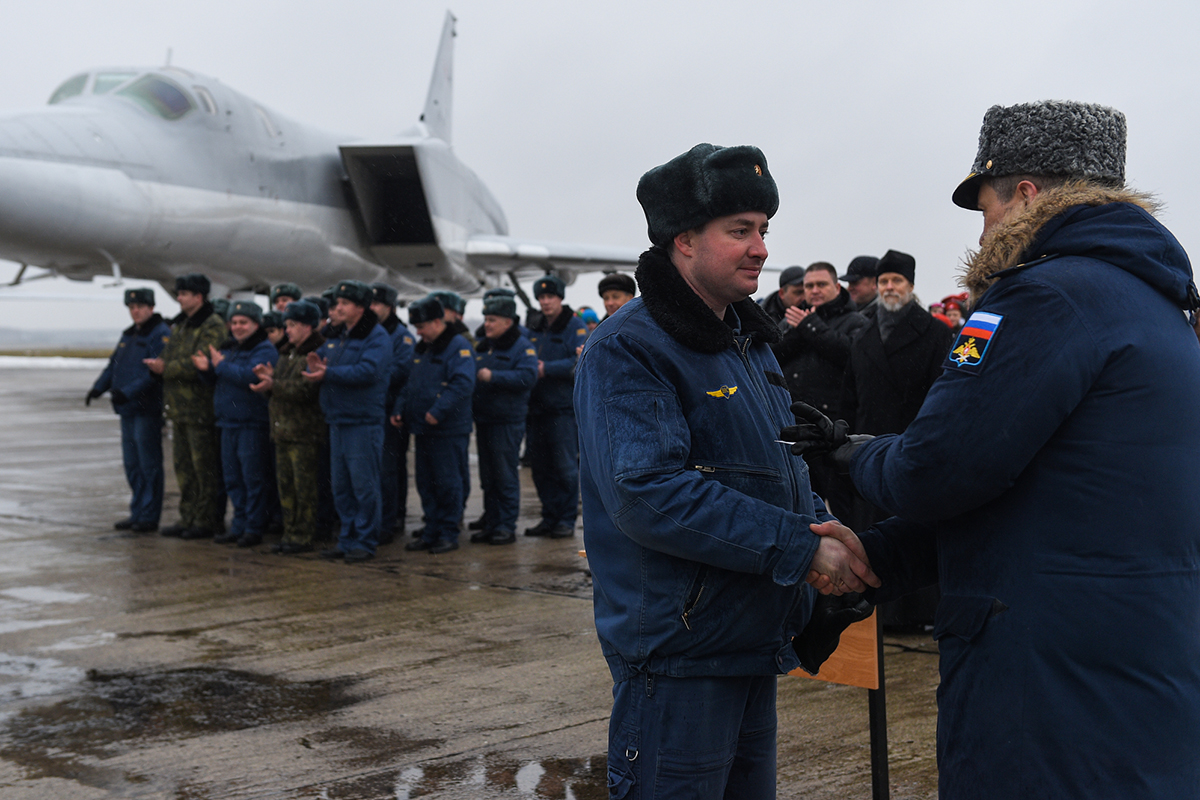
Kobylash awarding Tu-22M3 crew member at Shaykovka air base for his bombing missions in Syria

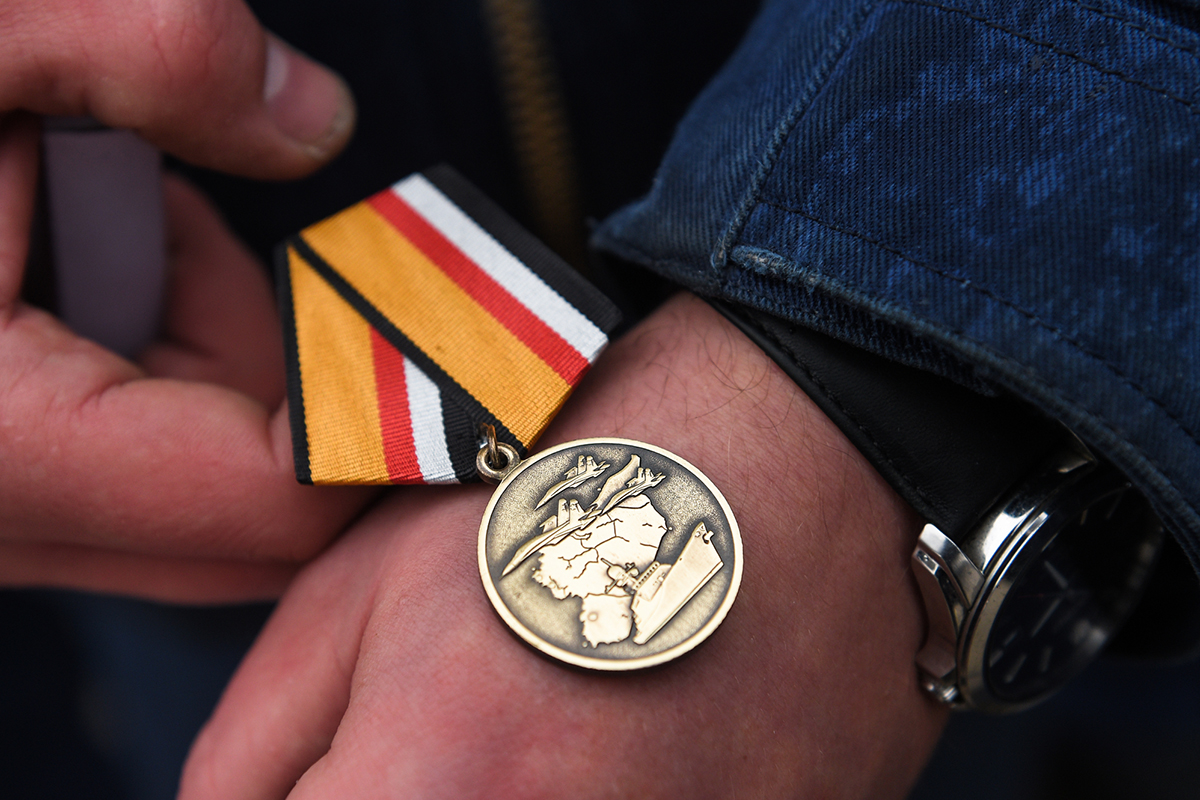
Medal awarded by Kobylash at Shaykovka air base for bombing missions in Syria

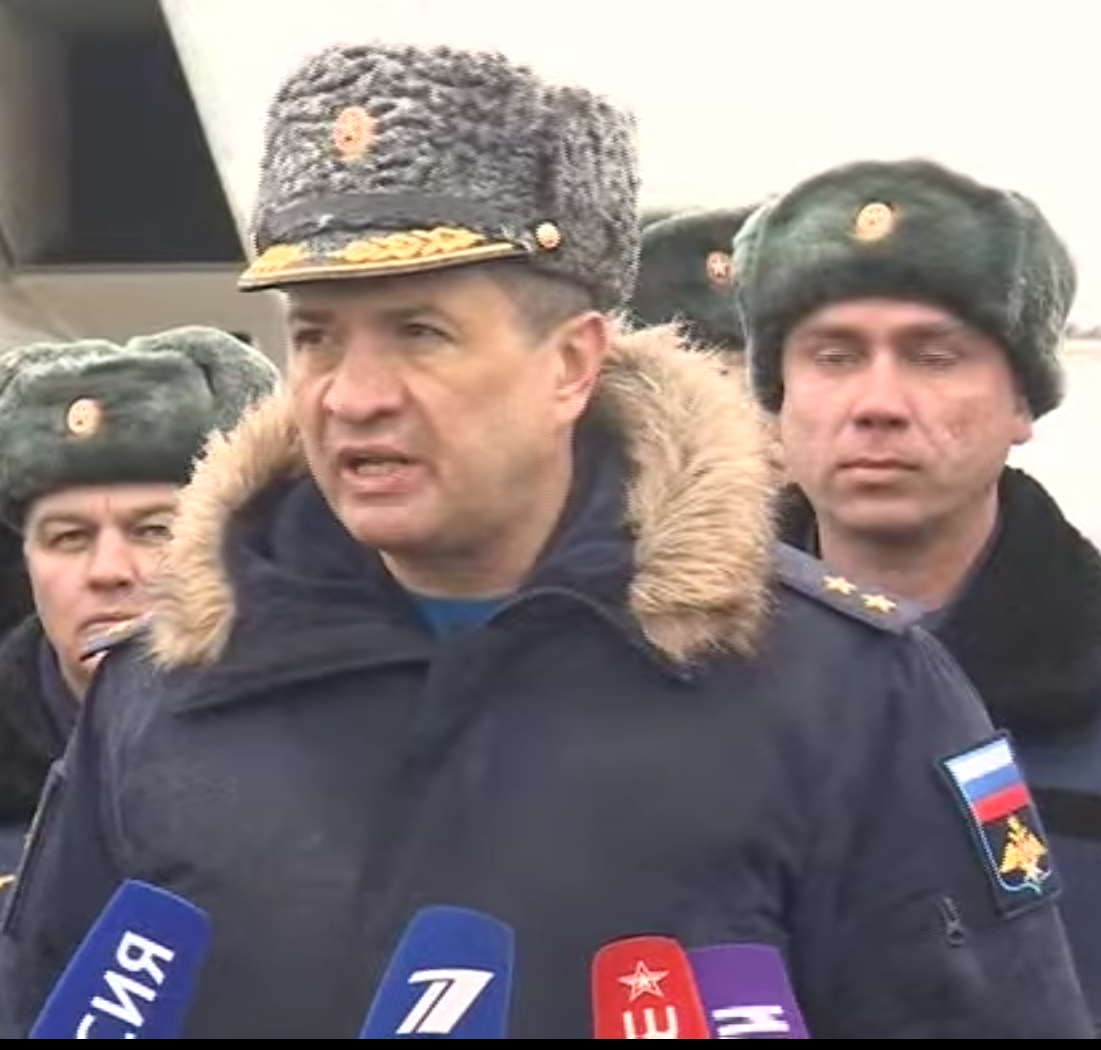
Kobylash making a statement to Russian media including Channel One Russia

=== Allegations and indictment ===
On 5 March 2024, the International Criminal Court issued an arrest warrant for Admiral Viktor Sokolov and Kobylash, as part of its Ukraine investigation, citing his alleged war crimes and crimes against humanity of directing attacks at civilian objects, causing excessive incidental harm to civilians or damage to civilian objects and inhumane acts during the Russian strikes against Ukrainian infrastructure and electrical grid, all under the Rome Statute.

On 10 September 2024 the Ukrainian government accused Kobylash of ordering the attack on the Okhmatdyt Children’s Hospital in Kyiv on 8 July. Ukraine’s SBU security service said in a statement that “Lieutenant General Sergei Kobylash held the post of long-range aviation commander for the Russian aerospace forces at the time, and after delivering this strike, was promoted and appointed commander of the Russian aerospace forces.”

== See also ==
- International Criminal Court arrest warrants for Russian leaders

Military offices
Preceded by Anatoly Zhikharev	Commander of Long-Range Aviation; 2016–2024	Succeeded by Sergey Kuvaldin
Preceded by Sergey Dronov	Commander of the Russian Air Force; 2024–present	Incumbent
