= Andrey Yudin (general) =

Russian military officer

Andrei Yudin
- Андрей Юдин
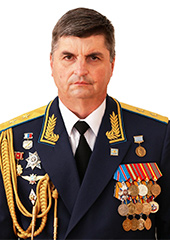
- Born: 2 April 1962 (age 64); Armavir, RSFSR
- Education: Armavir Higher Military Aviation School of Pilots; Gagarin Air Force Academy; General Staff Military Academy
- Military career
- Allegiance: Soviet Union (to 1991); Russia
- Branch: Soviet Air Forces; Russian Air Force; Russian Aerospace Forces
- Service years: 1978–2023
- Rank: Colonel general
- Commands: 4th Air and Air Defence Forces Command
- Conflicts: Russian intervention in the Syrian civil war

Andrei Vyacheslavovich Yudin (Russian: Андрей Вячеславович Юдин; born 2 April 1962) is a Russian military officer and a pilot who served as the Commander of the Russian Air Force from 2015 to 2019.

== Biography ==
Andrey Vyacheslavovich Yudin was born on 2 April 1962 in the city of Armavir, Krasnodar Krai. In 1983, he graduated with honours from the Armavir Higher Military Aviation School of Pilots. From 1983 to 1989, he served as a pilot, senior pilot, and flight commander in the Baltic Military District. In 1989, he was transferred to the Group of Soviet Forces in Germany as a flight commander of a fighter aviation regiment. From December 1989, he was deputy squadron commander of the Western Group of Forces. In 1996, he graduated with a gold medal from the Gagarin Air Force Academy, and in 2010, with honors from the General Staff Military Academy. From 1996 to 2008, he served as a squadron commander, deputy commander and commander of a fighter aviation regiment, deputy commander and commander of a fighter aviation division of the air defense of the Far Eastern Military District. In 2008 he was awarded the title "Honoured Military Pilot of the Russian Federation" and promoted to Major General rank. From 2010 to 2011 he served as Chief of the Combat Training Directorate of the Russian Air Force. From 14 February 2011 to 2012 he served as Deputy Commander of the 3rd Air and Air Defence Forces Command of the Eastern Military District. From May 2012 to August 2015 he served as Commander of the 4th Air and Air Defence Forces Command of the Southern Military District. By the Decree of the President of Russia and the Order of the Minister of Defense of Russia No. 389 of 11 June 2014, Andrei Yudin was awarded the military rank of lieutenant general.

On 1 August 2015, Lieutenant General Andrei Yudin was appointed Deputy Commander-in-Chief of the Russian Aerospace Forces and Commander of the Russian Air Force. In 2019, he was appointed Deputy Commander-in-Chief of the Russian Aerospace Forces. By the Decree of the President of Russia dated 8 December 2021 No. 694, he was awarded the military rank of colonel general. On 26 June 2023, following the rebellion of the Wagner Group, Andrei Yudin, along with Vladimir Alekseyev and Sergei Surovikin, were detained.
