= Viktor Bondarev =

Russian retired general (b. 1959)

- Виктор Николаевич Бондарев
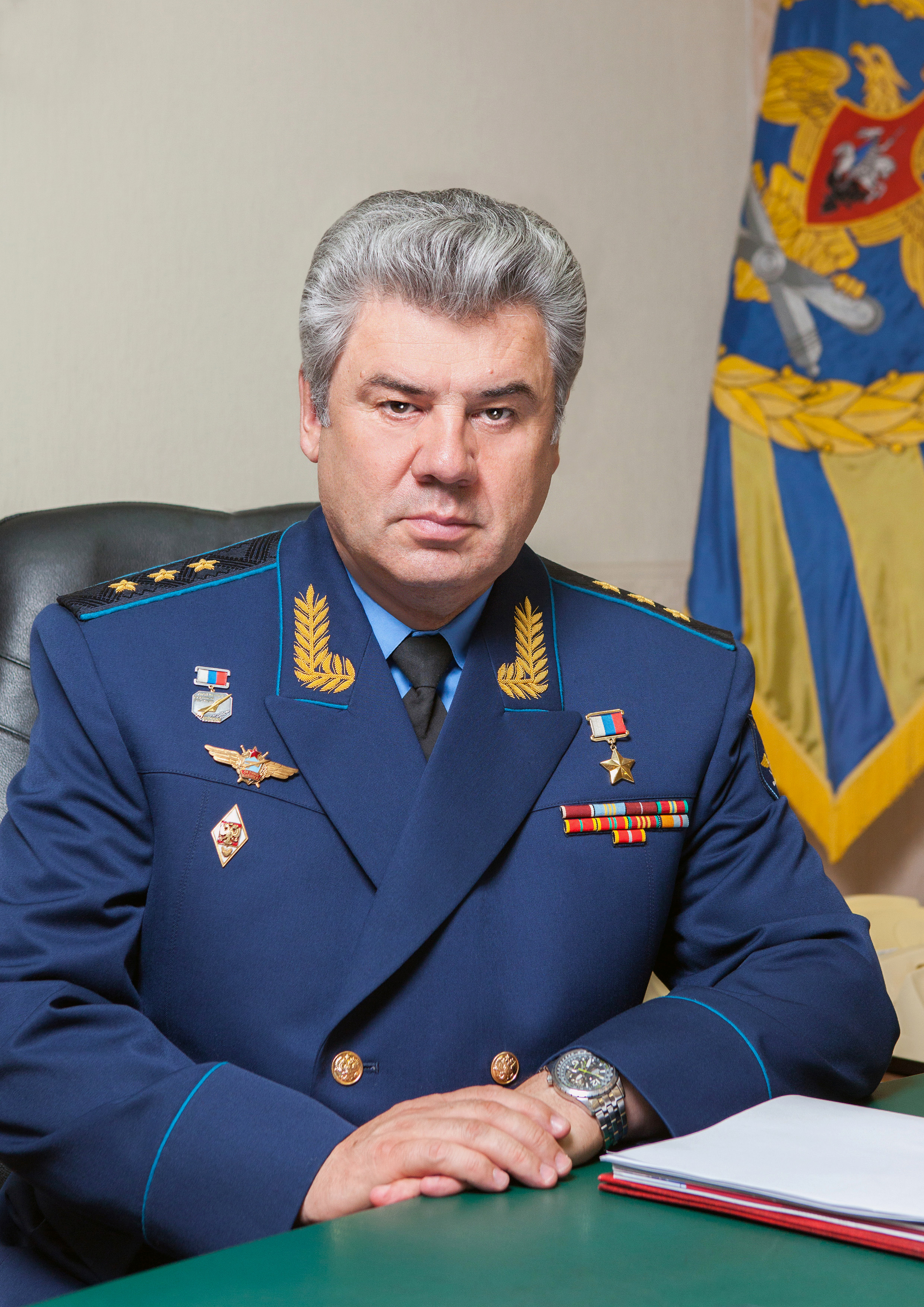
- Bondarev in 2012
- Born: 7 December 1959 (age 66); Voronezh, Russian SFSR, Soviet Union
- Military career
- Allegiance: Soviet Union (to 1991); Russia
- Branch: Soviet Air Force; Russian Air Force; Russian Aerospace Forces
- Service years: 1977–2017
- Rank: Colonel General
- Commands: Russian Air Force; Russian Aerospace Forces
- Conflicts: Syrian civil war
- Awards: Hero of the Russian Federation; Order of Courage; Order for Service to the Homeland in the Armed Forces of the USSR

Colonel General Viktor Nikolayevich Bondarev (Note: Russian: Виктор Николаевич Бондарев) (born 7 December 1959) is a retired Russian military officer who was the Commander-in-Chief of the Russian Aerospace Forces from 2015 to 2017. He was the former Commander-in-Chief of the Air Force before it became a branch of the Aerospace Forces, from 2012 to 2015.

== Biography ==
Bondarev's career started off with his joining the Soviet Air Force in 1977. By 1981, he had graduated from the Boris Aviation Training Centre for flight crews in Borisoglebsk, and by 1992 had graduated from the Gagarin Air Force Academy. In 2004, he graduated from the Military Academy of the General Staff.

He was a squadron commander of the Boris Aviation Training Centre before becoming a deputy commander and senior pilot of the Attack Aviation Regiment, and as such, participated in the Soviet–Afghan War. He then became the commander of the 899th Guards Assault Aviation Regiment located in Buturlinovka, Voronezh; the regiment fought in the First and Second Chechen Wars. In 2000, he became the deputy commander, before being appointed the Commander in 2004, of the 105th Composite Air Division, 16th Army Air Force and Air Defense. From May 2006, he became the Deputy Commander of the 14th Army Air Force and Air Defense; he would become the Commander of the branch in June 2008.

In July 2011, Bondarev was appointed Chief of the Main Staff and First Deputy Commander-in-Chief of the Russian Air Force.

On 21 April 2000, via a presidential decree, Bondarev was named a Hero of the Russian Federation for engaging in military activities involving significant risks to his life.

== Personal life ==
He was sanctioned by the UK government in 2022 in relation to the Russo-Ukrainian War.

== Awards ==
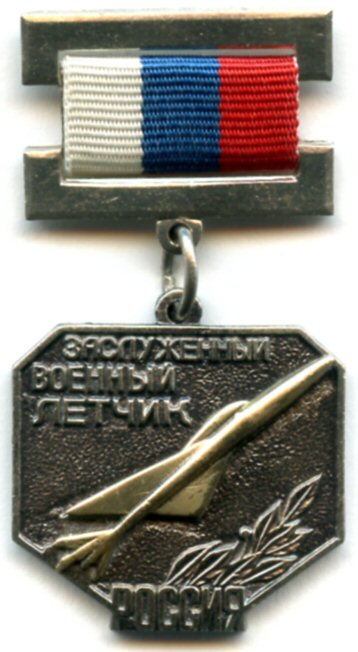

== See also ==
- List of Heroes of the Russian Federation

== Notes ==
Military offices
Preceded by Aleksandr Belevich	Commander of the 14th Air and Air Defence Forces Army; 2008–2009	Army reorganized
Command created	Commander of the 2nd Air and Air Defence Forces Command; 2009	Succeeded by Viktor Sevostyanov
Preceded by Anatoly Nogovitsyn	Deputy Commander-in-Chief of the Air Force; 2009–2011	Succeeded by Vladimir Gradusov
Preceded by Vadim Volkovitsky	Chief of the Main Staff and First Deputy Commander-in-Chief of the Air Force; 2011–2012	Succeeded by Yuri Petrushkov; Acting
Preceded by Alexander Zelin	Commander-in-Chief of the Air Force; 2012–2015	Succeeded by Andrey Yudin as Commander of the Air Force of the Aerospace Forces
Branch created	Commander-in-Chief of the Aerospace Forces; 2015–2017	Succeeded by Sergey Surovikin
