= Krasnodar Higher Military Aviation School of Pilots =

Military high school

- Краснодарское высшее военное авиационное училище лётчиков
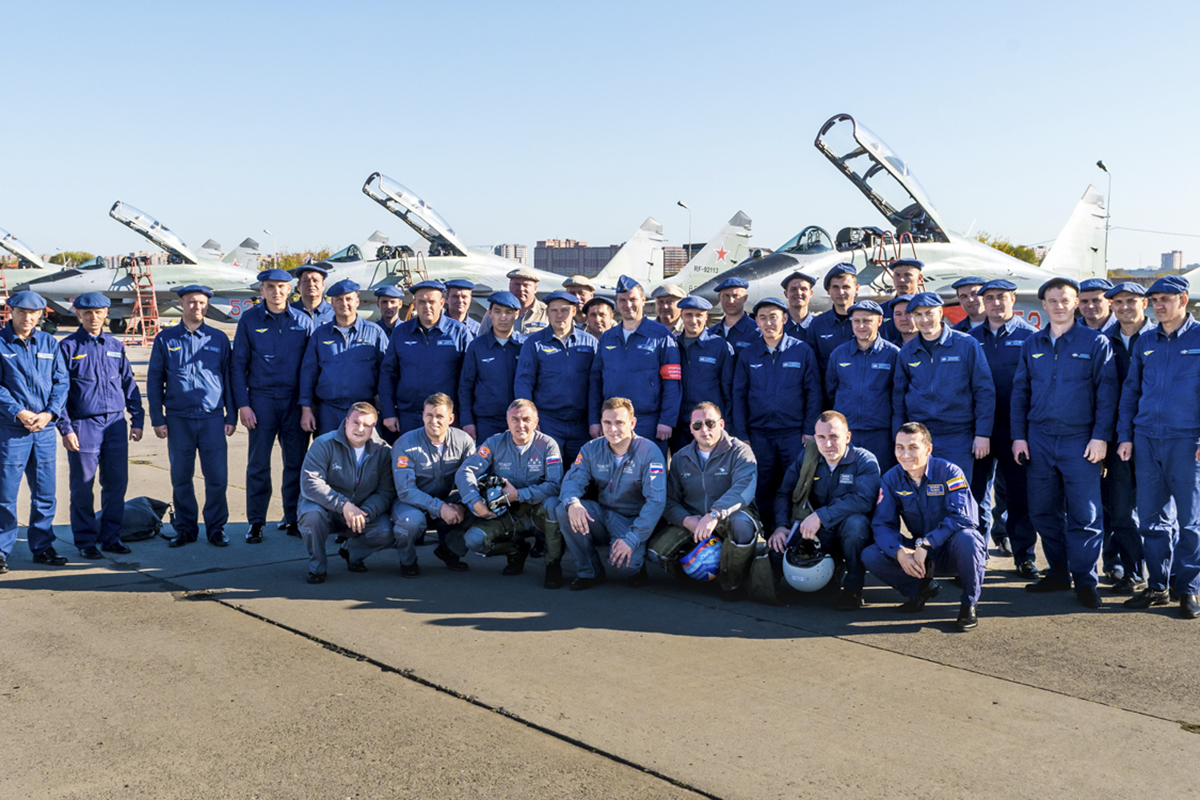
- Type: Higher military flying training school
- Established: 1938
- Rector: General-mayor Sergei Rumyantsev
- Location: 350090, Dzerzhinsky Street, 135, Krasnodar, (Russia)
- Campus: Urban
- Website: https://kvvaul.mil.ru/

Krasnodar Higher Military Aviation School of Pilots named after Hero of the Soviet Union A.K. Serov (Note: Russian: Краснодарское высшее военное авиационное училище лётчиков имени Героя Советского Союза А.К. Серова, romanized: Krasnodarskoye vyssheye voyennoye aviatsionnoye uchilishche lyotchikov imeni Geroya Sovetskogo Soyuza A. K. Serova) is a Russian higher military school conducting commissioned officer programmes (specialitet). It is located in Krasnodar.

== History ==
The School prepares military pilots for the Russian Aerospace Forces.

It was founded in 1938 in Chita. In 1939, it was relocated in Bataysk and was given the name of Anatoly Serov. Some of its graduates were sent to form the 120th Fighter Aviation Regiment in 1940.

The School was relocated to Krasnodar in 1960. In 1998, it was renamed the Krasnodar military aviation institute.

By Decree of the Government of the Russian Federation of May 10, 2001, by Order of the Minister of Defence of Russia No. 278 of June 23, 2001, the Armavir and Balashov Military Institutes were annexed to the Krasnodar Military Aviation Institute. From that moment on, flight training began to be carried out at the airfields Kushchevskaya, Kotelnikovo, Tikhoretsk, as well as in three aviation training centers:

- Armavir Center (Armavir, Maykop) - date of foundation: February 23, 1941.
- Borisoglebsk Center (Borisoglebsk, Michurinsk) - date of foundation: January 5, 1923.
- Balashov Center (Balashov, Rtishchevo) - date of foundation: July 15, 1944.

On July 9, 2004, by Order of the Government of the Russian Federation No. 937-R, the institute was renamed the Krasnodar Higher Military Aviation School of Pilots (military institute) named after Hero of the Soviet Union A.K. Serov.

During the celebration of the 100th anniversary of Russian aviation and the Kachinsky School in November 2010, the Minister of Defence of the Russian Federation issued an order to rename the Krasnodar Higher Military Aviation School of Pilots into the Kachinsky branch of the VUNTS Air Force, but in practice the Krasnodar Higher Military Aviation School was not renamed Kachinsky.

On April 23, 2012, in accordance with the directive of the Minister of Defence of the Russian Federation dated January 29 and the instructions of the General Staff Russian Armed Forces, the Krasnodar Higher Military Aviation School of Pilots (military institute) named after Hero of the Soviet Union A.K. Serov was renamed the Military Educational and Scientific Institute Air Force Center "Air Force Academy named after Professor N. E. Zhukovsky and Yu. A. Gagarin" (branch in Krasnodar), abbreviated as a branch of the VUNTS Air Force "VVA" (Krasnodar).

In November 2012, the Armavir, Borisoglebsk and Balashovsky aviation training centers were disbanded and the Flight Training Center (TsLP VUNTS VVVV "VVA") was formed, which included all the training aviation regiments (bases) of the Russian Air Force.

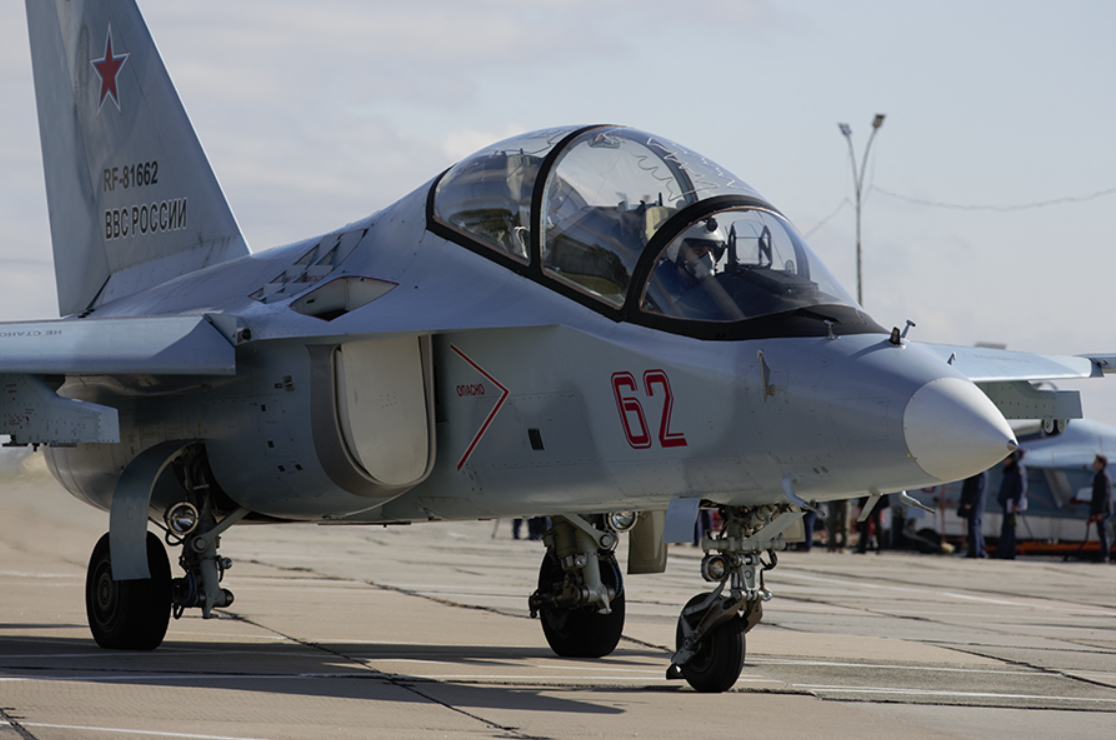
Yak-130 combat training aircraft at the school airfield

On August 1, 2015, the Flight Training Center (TsLP VUNTS VVVS VVA) was disbanded, and the branch VUNTS VVVV VVS (Krasnodar) was withdrawn from the VUNTS VVVV VVA named after. N. E. Zhukovsky and Yu. A. Gagarin" and was transformed into the Krasnodar Higher Military Aviation School of Pilots named after Hero of the Soviet Union A. K. Serov.

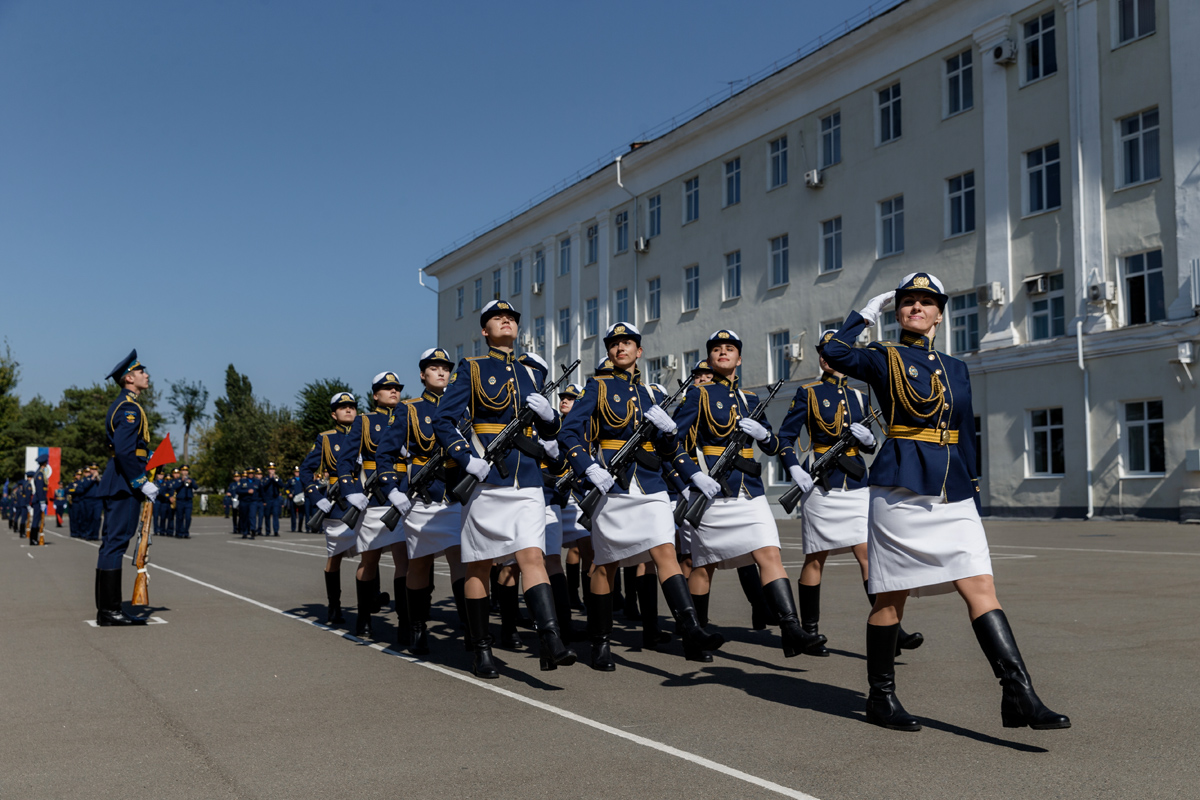
Female kursants (cadets) of the Krasnodar Higher Military Aviation School of Pilots at the oath taking ceremony, September 2017

Since 2011, the school began receiving Yak-130 aircraft for training cadets, and by the end of 2016, more than 70 combat training aircraft of this type had been received. The main fleet consisted of L-39, L-410, An-26, MiG-29, Su-27, and Sukhoi Su-25 aircraft.

In 2017, the first intake of female cadets at the school took place, and the first graduation with the participation of female recruits took place in autumn 2022.

Flight training is carried out at the airfields Kushchevskaya, Kotelnikovo, Tikhoretsk,

- Armavir (air base) (713th Training Aviation Regiment),
- Khanskaya (air base) near Maykop (761st Training Aviation Regiment)
- Borisoglebsk (air base) (160th Training Aviation Regiment),
- Michurinsk (air base),
- Balashov (air base), Saratov Oblast (606th Training Aviation Regiment)
- Rtishchevo, Saratov Oblast (666th Training Aviation Regiment)

== Alumni ==
- Bertalan Farkas
- Roman Filipov
- Viktor Gorbatko
- Yevgeny Khrunov
- Vladimir Komarov
- Aleksey Maresyev
- Abdul Ahad Momand
- Phạm Tuân
- Vitaly Popkov
- Georgy Shonin
- Nikolai Skomorokhov
- Nelson Stepanyan
