= Sergey Dronov =

Russian military leader (born 1962)

- Сергей Владимирович Дронов
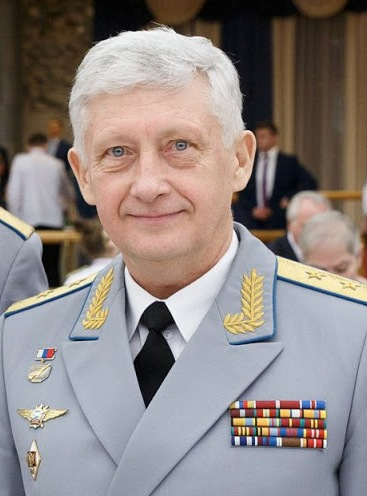
- Born: Sergey Vladimirovich Dronov; 11 August 1962 (age 64); Almazivka, Ukrainian SSR, Soviet Union
- Military career
- Allegiance: Soviet Union; Russia
- Service years: 1983–present
- Rank: Colonel General
- Conflicts: Soviet–Afghan War; First Chechen War; Second Chechen War; Syrian Civil War; Russo-Ukrainian War
- Awards: Order of the Red Star; Order of Zhukov; Medal For Impeccable Service; Order of Courage; Order of Military Merit; Medal "For the Return of Crimea"; Medal "Chief Marshal of Aviation Kutakhov"; Honoured Military Pilot of the Russian Federation

Sergey Vladimirovich Dronov (Russian: Сергей Владимирович Дронов; born 11 August 1962), is an officer of the Soviet and later Russian Armed Forces who was Commander of the Russian Air Force - Deputy Commander-in-Chief of the Russian Aerospace Forces between 2019 and 2024. He was the deputy commander-in-chief of the Aerospace Forces from 2015 to 2019, and is a colonel general as of 2023.

Due to Russia's invasion of Ukraine, he is under international sanctions from the European Union, the United Kingdom, Canada, and a number of other countries.

== Biography ==
Sergey Dronov was born on 11 August 1962 in the village of Almazivka, Rovenkovsky district, Voroshilovhrad Oblast, Ukrainian SSR.

In September 1981, Dronov, as a second-year cadet of the Yeysk Higher Military Aviation School named after V. N. Komarov, as part of a pair of L-29 training aircraft, practiced piloting techniques near the city of Bataysk, Rostov Oblast. His plane L-29 was at an altitude of 1200 meters when a bird got into the air intake of the plane. The result of the hit was the stop of a single engine. Having contacted the flight director by radio, he reported on what had happened. From the ground followed by a command to apply a counter launch. After a number of attempts to restart, the engine did not start. The option of ejection of the pilot was excluded, due to the location of the aircraft over the residential area of the city of Bataysk, the fall of the aircraft would inevitably lead to human casualties on the ground. Having assessed the situation, he decided to land the plane with the landing gear retracted on a mowed field outside the city. He requested permission from the flight director and began a systematic descent. Landing on the field was quite smooth, the overload was 1.2 g. With the landing gear retracted, the plane landed safely on its belly, plowing several tens of meters along the ground. As Dronov later recalled about the incident, “The history of aviation knows cases when, in similar situations, even experienced pilots could not land the aircraft and died.” In March 1982, by decree of the Presidium of the Supreme Soviet of the USSR, Dronov was awarded the Order of the Red Star for his courage and heroism. It was a rare case of awarding a major medal to a cadet.

Since 30 September 2015, he has been leading the aviation group of Russian forces in Syria. From 26 September to 22 November 2017, he served as the Commander-in-Chief of the Russian Aerospace Forces ex officio.

== Sanctions ==
On 22 February 2022, against the backdrop of Russia's invasion of Ukraine, Dronov was included in the EU sanctions list, as he is "responsible for air operations in Ukraine. Therefore, he is responsible for actively supporting and implementing actions and policies that undermine and threaten the territorial integrity, sovereignty and independence of Ukraine, as well as stability and security in Ukraine.”

On 14 March 2022 included in Canada's sanctions list, dubbing him for the "comrades in the regime" for "facilitating and supporting the choice of President Putin to invade a peaceful and sovereign country.". On March 15, 2022, he was sanctioned by the UK for participating in the deployment of Russian forces involved in the Russian invasion of Ukraine.

For similar reasons, he is included in the sanctions lists of Switzerland, Australia, and Japan, Ukraine, and New Zealand.
