= Vladimir Mikhaylov (general) =

Russian retired general (born 1943)

- Владимир Сергеевич Михайлов
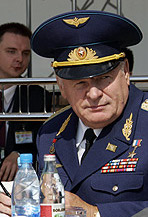
- Mikhailov in 2005
- Born: 6 October 1943 (age 83); Kudinovo, Moscow Oblast, Russian SFSR, Soviet Union
- Alma mater: Yeysk Higher Military Aviation School; Gagarin Air Force Academy; Voroshilov General Staff Academy
- Military career
- Allegiance: Soviet Union (to 1991); Russia
- Branch: Soviet Air Force; Russian Air Force
- Service years: 1966–2007
- Rank: General of the Army
- Commands: Commander-in-Chief of the Russian Air Force; 4th Air Army; North Caucasus Military District Air Force
- Conflicts: First Chechen War
- Awards: Hero of the Russian Federation; Order "For Personal Courage"; Order of Military Merit

General of the Army Vladimir Sergeyevich Mikhaylov (Note: Russian: Владимир Сергеевич Михайлов) (born 6 October 1943) is a retired Russian Air Force officer who was the Commander-in-Chief of the Air Force from 2002 to 2007. Before that, he was the Deputy Commander-in-Chief of the Air Force from 1998 to 2002.

He graduated from the Yeysk Higher Military Aviation School in 1966. During his career, he had 6,000 flight hours on many types of aircraft in the Soviet Air Force. Mikhaylov commanded the air force of the North Caucasus Military District from 1991, which became the 4th Air Army in 1993. He flew 42 combat sorties during the First Chechen War, for which he was awarded the title Hero of the Russian Federation in 1996. His other awards include the Order "For Personal Courage" and the title Honoured Military Pilot of the USSR.

== Early life and education ==
Vladimir Sergeyevich Mikhaylov was born on 6 June 1943 in Kudinovo, Moscow Oblast, in the Russian SFSR of the Soviet Union. He was educated at the Kudinovo machinist vocational school, graduating in 1962, and then at the Yeysk Higher Military Aviation School, which he graduated in 1966. His later education included the Gagarin Air Force Academy in 1975 and the Voroshilov General Staff Academy in 1991.

== Military career ==
Mikhaylov gained 6,000 flight hours on all types of aircraft flown by the Soviet Air Force during his career. He served in numerous command positions, including as dean of Borisoglebsk Aviation Training Center from 1980 to 1985, and as deputy and then first deputy commander of the Moscow Military District air force from 1985 to 1989. As a lieutenant general, Mikhaylov was appointed as commander of the North Caucasus Military District air force in 1991, which was reorganized as the 4th Air Army in 1993.

In December 1993, he participated in an operation to rescue schoolchildren that were taken hostage in Rostov-on-Don, which was successful. Two pilots under his command received the title Hero of the Russian Federation for their actions in that operation. During the First Chechen War from 1994 to 1996, Mikhaylov personally flew 42 combat sorties, in which he destroyed multiple targets of the Chechen insurgents. He was also involved in the airstrike that led to the death of Chechen leader Dzhokhar Dudayev. For his actions he was awarded the title Hero of the Russian Federation on 13 June 1996.

Mikhaylov became the deputy commander-in-chief of the Russian Air Force in April 1998, and was promoted to colonel general that year. He emphasized to Izvestia in 2001 that due to financial difficulties, the Air Force was had less experienced flight crews, ageing aircraft, and delays in developing new equipment. In January 2002 he became the commander-in-chief of the Air Force. On 22 February 2004, he was promoted to general of the army. His time in office was extended in October 2003 and October 2006, despite him being over the normal retirement age for generals. However, in May 2007 he was retired by a decree of the president, due to his age.

== Orders and decorations ==
- Hero of the Russian Federation (1996)
- Order for Service to the Homeland in the Armed Forces of the USSR 3rd class (1982)
- Order "For Personal Courage" (1994)
- Order of Military Merit (1996)
- Honoured Military Pilot of the USSR
- Honorary citizen of Yeysk (1998)
- Honorary citizen of Borisoglebsk (2000)
- Honorary citizen of Noginsky District (2014)
- Badge of honour of the governor of the Tver Oblast (Cross of the Holy Michael of Tver in 2004)

== Personal life ==
He worked in the United Aircraft Corporation at the department for implementing government orders from August 2007.

== See also ==
- List of Heroes of the Russian Federation

== Notes ==
Military offices
Preceded by Anatoly Basov	Commander of the 4th Air Army; 1993–1998	Succeeded by Valery Gorbenko
Preceded by Viktor Kot	Deputy Commander-in-Chief of the Russian Air Force; 1998–2002	Succeeded by Anatoly Nogovitsyn
Preceded by Anatoly Kornukov	Commander-in-Chief of the Russian Air Force; 2002–2007	Succeeded by Aleksandr Zelin
