= Alexander Zelin =

Russian retired general (born 1953)

Alexander Nikolayevich Zelin
- Александр Николаевич Зелин
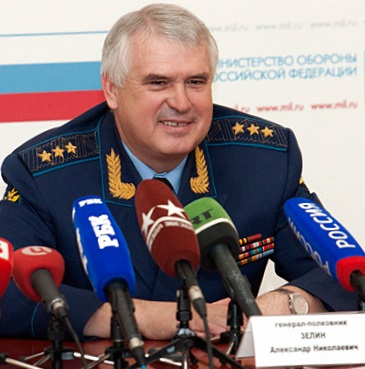
- Born: 6 May 1953 (age 73); Perevalsk, Ukrainian SSR, Soviet Union
- Education: Kharkov Higher Aviation School of Pilots; Gagarin Air Force Academy; Military Academy of the General Staff of the Armed Forces of Russia
- Military career
- Allegiance: Soviet Union (to 1991); Russia
- Branch: Soviet Air Force; Russian Air Force
- Service years: 1976–2012
- Rank: Colonel General
- Commands: Commander-in-Chief of the Russian Air Force; 4th Air and Air Defence Forces Army; 14th Air and Air Defence Forces Army
- Awards: Order of St. George, Order of Merit, Honoured Military Pilot of the Russian Federation

Alexander Nikolayevich Zelin (Note: Russian: Александр Николаевич Зелин) (born 6 May 1953) served as Commander-in-Chief of the Russian Air Force from 9 May 2007 until 27 April 2012. Zelin holds the Air Force rank of colonel-general. Since May 2012 Zelin has been an adviser to the Russian Defence Minister.

== Early life and education ==
Alexander Zelin was born on 6 May 1953, in Perevalsk, Voroshilovgrad Oblast, Ukrainian Soviet Socialist Republic (now Luhansk Oblast in eastern Ukraine). He graduated from Kharkov Higher Aviation School of Pilots (now part of the Ivan Kozhedub National University of the Air Force) in 1976 as a distinguished graduate. Zelin's later education included the Gagarin Air Force Academy, graduating in 1988, and the Military Academy of the General Staff of the Armed Forces of Russia in 1997.

== Military career ==
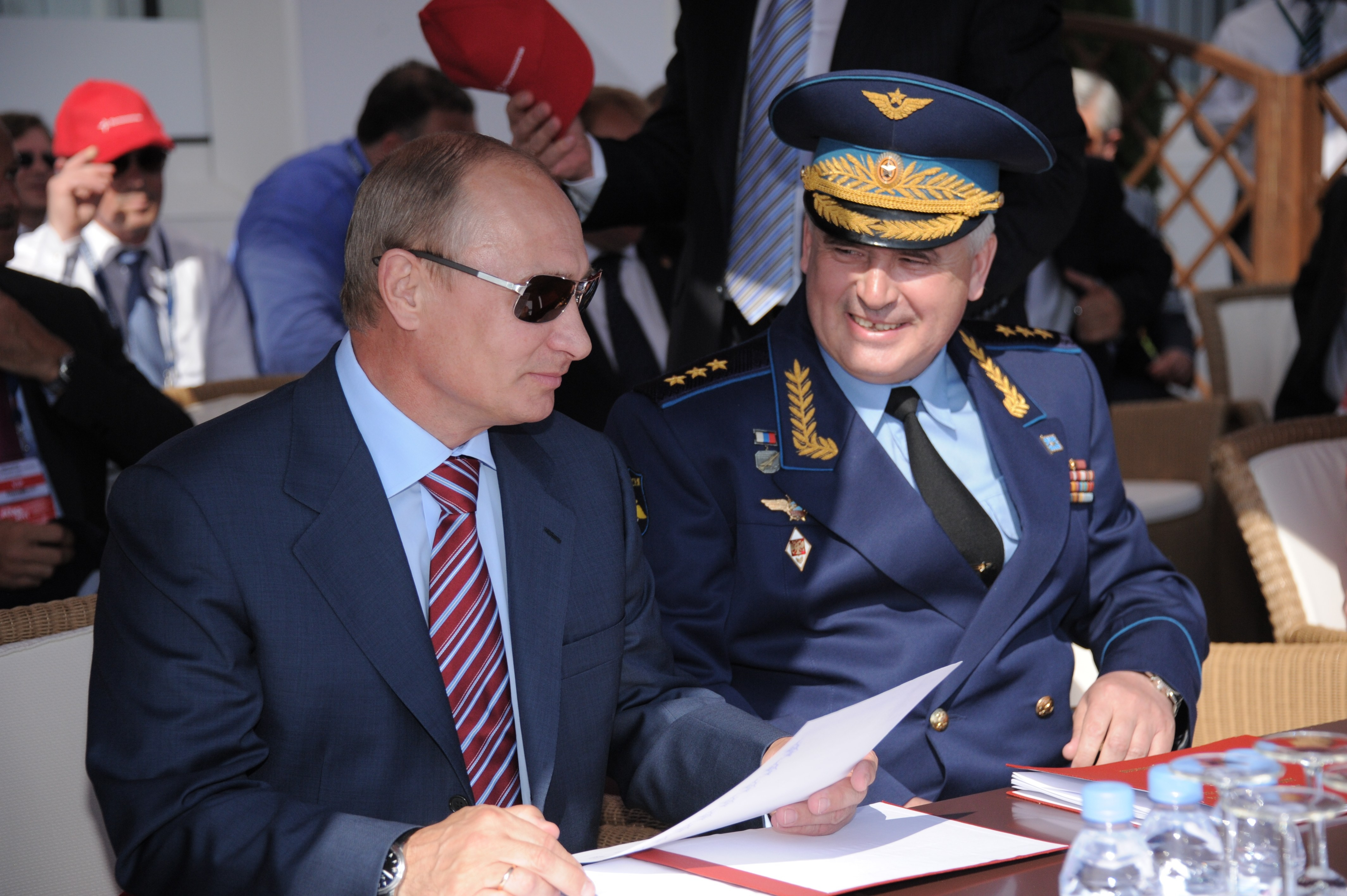
Zelin and Putin at MAKS 2011

Zelin began his service in the 787th Fighter Aviation Regiment of the Group of Soviet Forces in Germany, stationed at Eberswalde, East Germany. As a pilot he has about 3,000 flight hours on ten types of aircraft. He went on to hold several command roles, and during the 1980s he was the deputy commander of the 115th Guards Fighter Aviation Regiment in the Turkestan Military District.

From August 2002 to May 2007 he served as Chief of aviation – Air Force Deputy Commander-in-Chief for aviation.

On May 9, 2007, he became the Commander-in-Chief of the Russian Air Force, replacing Army General Vladimir Mikhaylov.

On April 27, 2012, he was dismissed from his post and military service. No reason was given. He was succeeded by Viktor Bondarev.

== Honours and awards ==
=== Russian Federation ===
- Honoured Military Pilot of the Russian Federation
- Order of St. George, 2nd class
- Order of Merit for the Fatherland, 4th class
- Order of Military Merit
- Medal For Strengthening Military Cooperation (Min Def)
- Medal "200 Years of the Ministry of Defence" (Min Def)
- Medal "For Distinguished Military Service" 1st Class

=== Soviet Union ===
- Order of the Red Star
- Jubilee Medal "60 Years of the Armed Forces of the USSR"
- Jubilee Medal "70 Years of the Armed Forces of the USSR"
- Medals "For Impeccable Service" 2nd and 3rd classes

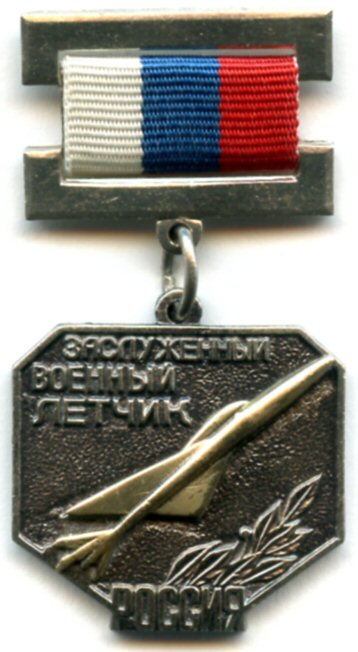

== Notes ==
Military offices
Preceded by Valery Nechayev	Commander of the 14th Air and Air Defence Forces Army; 2000–2001	Succeeded by Nikolai Danilov
Preceded by Valery Gorbenko	Commander of the 4th Air and Air Defence Forces Army; 2001–2002	Succeeded by Vladimir Gorbas
Preceded by ???	Director of Aviation of the Russian Air Force; Deputy Commander-in-Chief of the Russian Air Force for Aviation; 2002–2007	Succeeded by Igor Sadofyev
Preceded by Vladimir Mikhaylov	Commander-in-Chief of the Russian Air Force; 2007–2012	Succeeded by Viktor Bondarev
