= Anatoly Kornukov =

Russian general (1942–2014)

- Анатолий Михайлович Корнуков
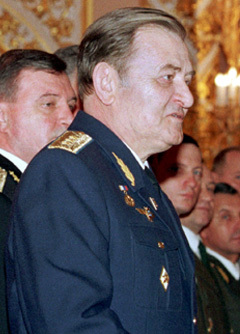
- Anatoly Kornukov in 2000
- Born: Anatoly Mikhailovich Kornukov; January 10, 1942; Stakhanov, Ukrainian SSR, Soviet Union (now Kadiivka, Ukraine)
- Died: 1 July 2014 (aged 72); Krasnogorsk, Russia
- Education: Chernigov Higher Aviation School for Pilots; Zhukov Air and Space Defence Academy; Voroshilov General Staff Academy
- Spouse: Lyudmila Vasilievna
- Children: 2
- Military career
- Allegiance: Soviet Union (to 1991); Russia
- Branch: Soviet Air Defence Forces; Russian Air Defence Forces; Russian Air Force
- Service years: 1962–2002
- Rank: General of the Army
- Commands: Commander-in-Chief of the Russian Air Force; Far Eastern Military District; 11th Separate Air Defence Army
- Conflicts: Soviet–Afghan War; Shootdown of KAL Flight 007; Second Chechen War
- Awards: See below

General of the Army Anatoly Mikhailovich Kornukov (Note: Russian: Анатолий Михайлович Корнуков) (10 January 1942 – 1 July 2014) was a general in the Russian Air Force and the former fighter pilot in the Soviet Air Defence Forces. From 1998 until 2002, he served as the Commander-in-Chief of the Russian Air Force. He is remembered for ordering Korean Air Lines Flight 007 to be shot down, resulting in the deaths of all 269 aboard.

== Early life ==
Kornukov was born in the city of Kadiivka in Ukrainian SSR in 1942. His father was a miner from Donetsk, who took part in the Second World War.

== Military career ==
He joined the Soviet Armed Forces in 1959, and sent to study at the Kremenchug Military Aviation School for the initial pilot training. However, in 1960 it was disbanded, and some of the cadets, including Kornukov, were transferred to the Chernigov Military Aviation School of Pilots named after the Lenin Komsomol, which he graduated with honors in 1964. After college, he was assigned to the 54th Guards Kerch Red Banner Fighter Aviation Regiment of the Soviet Air Defence Forces, where he served as a pilot and deputy commander of a fighter squadron.

In 1970, he was transferred to the 47th Fighter Aviation Regiment in the Soviet Far East as deputy commander of an aviation squadron for political affairs. From 1971, he commanded a fighter aviation squadron. On 1972, he was appointed as deputy commander and from 1974 to 1976, he served as commander of the 777th Fighter Aviation Regiment in Sakhalin Island. During his period of service with the Soviet Air Defense Forces, Kornukov made over 150 missions which included reconnaissance, interception of air targets, prevention and suppression of violations of the Soviet airspace.

From 1976, he was appointed as deputy commander of the Air Defense Corps in the Far East. On 1978, he was appointed as deputy chief of aviation of the 11th Air Defense Army in the Far East. In 1980, he graduated in absentia from the Military Academy of Air Defense named after Marshal of the Soviet Union G.K. Zhukov. On 1980, Kornukov was appointed as commander of the 40th Fighter Division in Air Defense Forces in the Far East. The regiments of the division were stationed in Sovetskaya Gavan, Sakhalin and Kuril Islands.

=== Shootdown of Korean Air Lines Flight 007 ===
On 1 September 1983, while en route from New York City to Seoul, South Korea with stopover in Anchorage, Alaska, Korean Air Lines Flight 007, a Boeing 747-230B carrying 246 passengers and 23 crew, went astray and entered Soviet airspace, first over Kamchatka.

Kornukov was serving as commander of Dolinsk-Sokol Air Base and subordinate to commander of the Far Eastern Military District Air Defense Forces, General Valeri Kamensky. Kornukov received the command from Kamensky to shoot down the airliner, while it was over the international waters of Okhotsk, having exited Kamchatkan air space.

Kamensky: "...simply destroy [it] even if it is over neutral waters? Are the orders to destroy it over neutral waters? Oh, well."

Though Kamensky had ordered KAL 007 to be shot down while over international waters, he insisted that it first be verified as not civilian. Kornukov insisted that there was no need.

Kamensky: "We must find out, maybe it is some civilian craft or God knows who.

Kornukov: What civilian? [It] has flown over Kamchatka! It [came] from the ocean without identification. I am giving the order to attack if it crosses the State border."

Kornukov gave the order for the shootdown as KAL 007 was about to pass out of the Soviet airspace over Sakhalin Island into International air space:

"Oh (obscenities) How long [does it take him] to go to attack position, he is already getting out into neutral waters. Engage after burner immediately. Bring in the MiG 23 as well. while you are wasting time, it will fly right out."

The aircraft was shot down by a Su-15 interceptor flown by pilot Major Gennady Osipovich. The Korean airliner eventually crashed in the sea near Moneron Island west of Sakhalin in the Sea of Japan. All 269 passengers and crew aboard were killed.

Kornukov, who had retained his position even when, in 1976, a pilot under his command, Victor Belenko, had defected to Japan with his MiG-25—the most advanced Soviet fighter of the time—also survived the KAL 007 incident, eventually attaining the highest appointment possible in his field of service. Kornukov was neither awarded nor punished for the KAL 007 shootdown.

Asked how he felt about the victims on board KAL 007, Kornukov said the downing left him with some "unpleasant feelings" but suggested that casualties were simply the price that had to be paid. Kornukov never shied away from questions on this topic, always emphasizing that his order was based on the norms of international and Soviet law. He believes that KAL 007 was a provocation from the United States, designed to identify the weaknesses of the Soviet air defense and to worsen Soviet-American relations. On Hero of the Day, a Russian television interview show, Kornukov commented:

"I will always be convinced that I gave the right order. Sometimes, in strategic operations, we had to sacrifice battalions to save the army. In the given situation, I am quite sure that this was a pre-planned action that pursued quite obvious goals."

=== Further career ===
From 1985, he was assigned as the commander of the 71st Fighter Aviation Corps, stationed with the Group of Soviet Forces in Germany. The corps consisted of two divisions and six separate air defense regiments. In 1988, he graduated from the Military Academy of the General Staff of the Armed Forces named after K. E. Voroshilov.

In 1988, Kornukov was appointed as first deputy chief of aviation of the Soviet Air Defense Forces. From 1989, he was assigned as first deputy commander and in 1990 he was commander of the 11th Separate Air Defense Army based in Khabarovsk. The unit was the largest air defense army in the USSR, covering a huge territory and included four air defense corps, two separate air defense division and large number of separate units.

In August 1991, he was appointed as commander of the Moscow Air Defense District, which covered military and civilian facilities on the territory of 29 constituent entities of the Soviet Union and later of the Russian Federation.

=== Russian Air Force ===
On January 22, 1998, Boris Yeltsin appointed Kornukov as Commander of the Russian Air Force. This appointment by Yeltsin came on the heels of Yeltsin's dismissal of General Pyotr Deynekin, who had headed the air force since 1992. Deinekin was pressed to resign after a Russian Air Force Antonov An-124 cargo plane crashed after takeoff at Irkutsk Airport and landed on a nearby apartment complex, killing over 60 people.

In January 2002, Kornukov resigned as Commander of the Russian Air Force and advised the Russian Federation in matters of missile defense and defense against aerial hijacker terrorist attacks against Russian cities.

Against the terrorist threat from the air, he believed Russia is unprepared considering the Russian air defense commanders often absentee, "passing the buck", and lacking coordination. The following is an example of his firm stance as reported in Pravda of March 31, 2004:

"Former commander of Russian Air Force, General Anatoly Kornukov calls Russian authorities to be tough in dealing with NATO aircraft which would appear near Russian borders after Baltic countries" joining the alliance, the Russia Journal said. NATO gained seven new allies [on] new Russian borders. "Because of NATO expanding we should apply tough policy, including tough measures to NATO aircraft. If an aircraft violated the state border, it must be shot down. International law allows this", said General Kornukov. "To begin with, the Baltic states should be reminded that good-neighbor relations have nothing to do with military aircraft barraging along the neighboring country borders. They are flying not just for pleasure, they are likely to be well-armed".

== Later life ==
After his retirement from the Air Force, Kornukov worked as deputy general director of the Almaz Scientific and Production Association for Military-Technical Policy, which is responsible for the development of anti-aircraft missile systems and other air defense systems, and is the head enterprise of the military-industrial complex of the Russian Federation.

He died at the age of 72 on 1 July 2014.

== Honours and awards ==
- Order For Merit to the Fatherland 3rd class
- Order For Merit to the Fatherland 4th class
- Order of Military Merit
- Order of the Red Star (USSR)
- Order for Service to the Homeland in the Armed Forces of the USSR 2nd class (USSR)
- Order for Service to the Homeland in the Armed Forces of the USSR 3rd class (USSR)
- Jubilee Medal "Twenty Years of Victory in the Great Patriotic War 1941-1945" (USSR)
- Jubilee Medal "50 Years of Victory in the Great Patriotic War 1941-1945"
- Jubilee Medal "300 Years of the Russian Navy"
- Medal "In Commemoration of the 850th Anniversary of Moscow"
- Medal "For Diligence in Engineering Tasks" (Min Def)
- Medal "Veteran of the Armed Forces of the USSR" (USSR)
- Jubilee Medal "50 Years of the Armed Forces of the USSR" (USSR)
- Jubilee Medal "60 Years of the Armed Forces of the USSR" (USSR)
- Jubilee Medal "70 Years of the Armed Forces of the USSR" (USSR)
- Medal "For Strengthening Military Cooperation" (MVD)
- Medal "For Military Valour" 1st Class (Min Def)
- Medal "For Strengthening Military Cooperation" (Min Def)
- Medal "For Impeccable Service" 1st, 2nd and 3rd classes USSR)
- State Prize of the Russian Federation
- Order "Danaker" (Kyrgyzstan)

== See also ==
- Korean Air Lines Flight 007
- William C. Rogers III

== Notes ==
Military offices
Preceded by Pyotr Deinekin	Commander-in-chief of the Russian Air Force; 1998 – 2002	Succeeded by Vladimir Mikhaylov
