= Rtishchevo Air Base =

Air Base in Saratov Oblast, Russia

Rtishchevo
- Ртищево
- Rtishchevo, Saratov Oblast in Russia
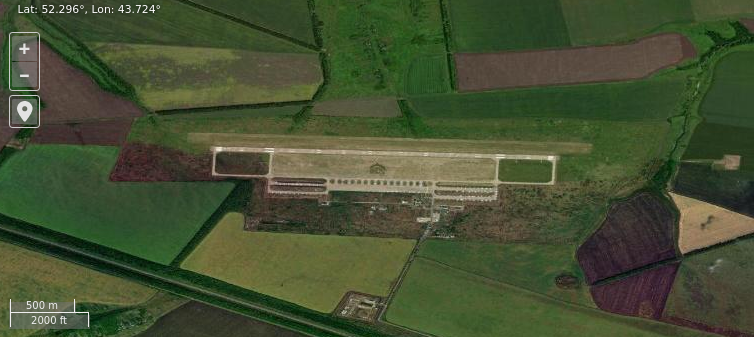
- Satellite imagery of Rtishchevo air base

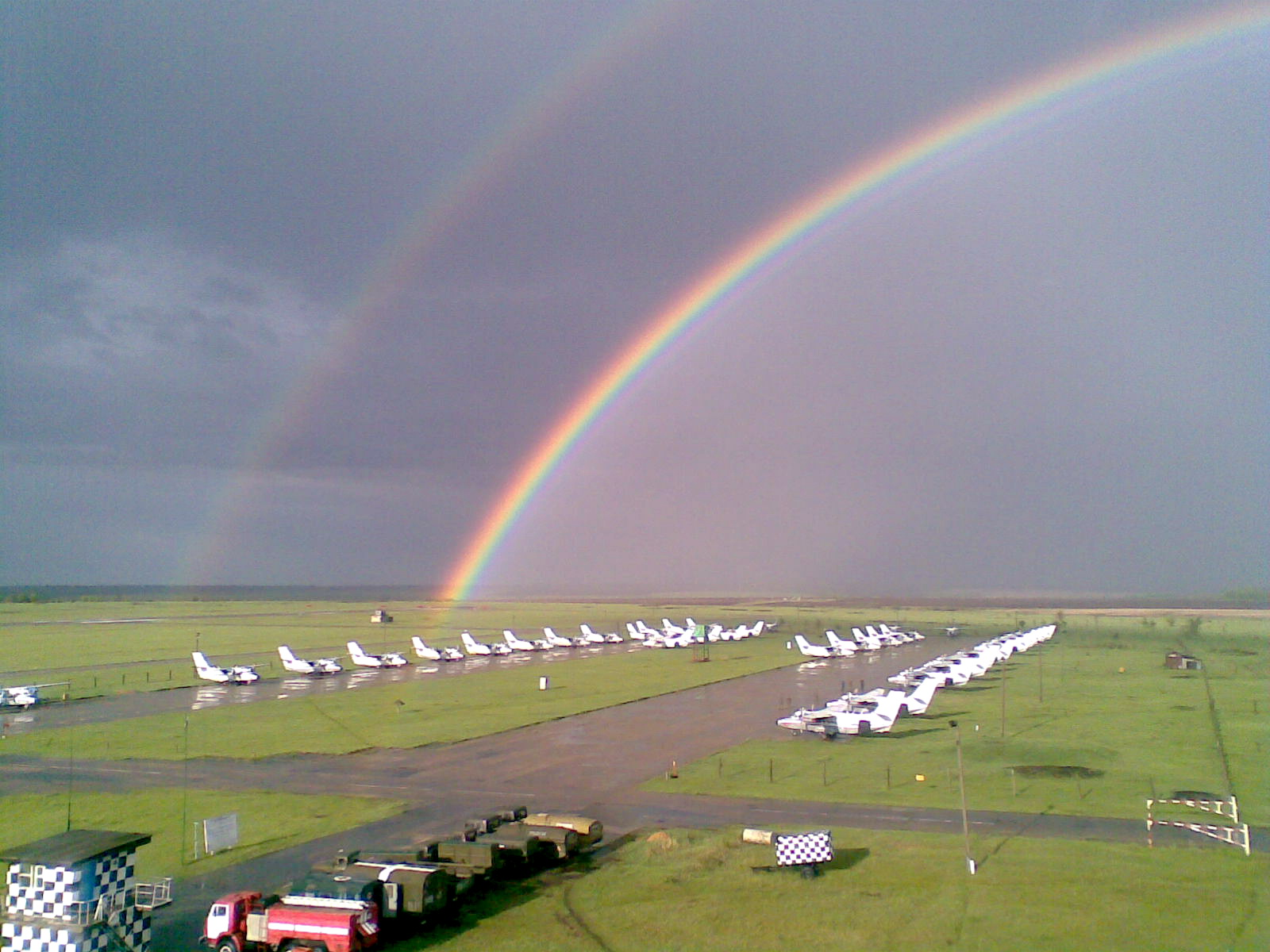

Site information
- Type: Air Base
- Owner: Ministry of Defence
- Operator: Russian Aerospace Forces

Location
- Shown within Saratov Oblast Rtishchevo (Russia)
- Coordinates: 52°17′45″N 43°43′25″E

Site history
- In use: present

Airfield information
- Elevation: 205 metres (673 ft) AMSL
Runways
Direction	Length and surface
08/26	2,000 metres (6,562 ft) Concrete

Rtishchevo is an air base in Russia located 6 km northwest of Rtishchevo. It is a Let L-410UVP-E Turbolet training base. Very few structures exist near the airfield.

The base is home to the 666th Training Aviation Regiment of the 786th Aviation Training Centre for the Training of Flight Personnel.

Michael Holm's data as of 2011 appears to suggest that Rtischchevo as of 1990 was home to the 666th Training Aviation Regiment of the Balashov Higher Military Aviation School for Pilots, subordinated to the Air Forces of the Volga-Ural Military District.

== See also ==
- List of military airbases in Russia
