= Pyotr Deynekin =

Russian Air Force general

Hero of the Russian Federation Pyotr Deynekin
- Пётр Дейне́кин
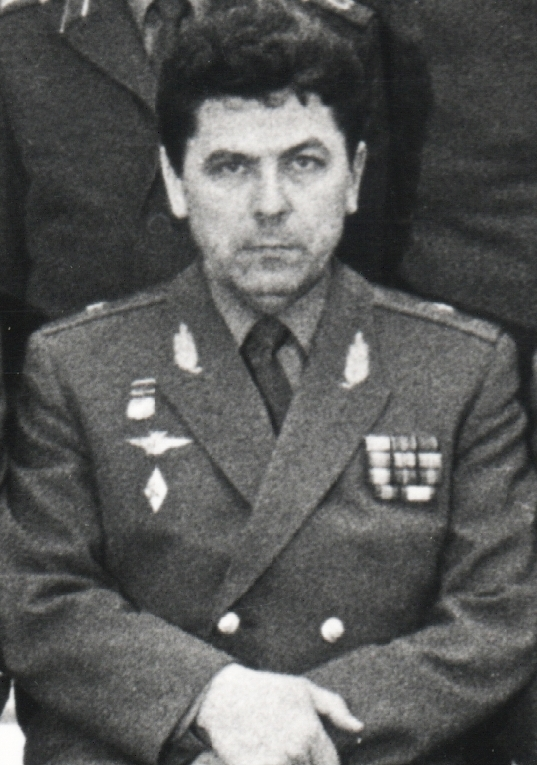
- Deynekin in 1988
- Born: 14 December 1937; Morozovsk, Rostov Oblast, Russian SFSR, Soviet Union
- Died: 19 August 2017 (aged 79); Moscow, Russia
- Military career
- Allegiance: Soviet Union; Russia
- Branch: Soviet Air Forces; Russian Air Force
- Service years: 1969–2002
- Rank: Army General
- Awards: Hero of Russia

General of the Army Pyotr Stepanovich Deynekin (Russian: Пётр Степа́нович Дейне́кин; 14 December 1937 – 19 August 2017) was a Russian and Soviet military officer who was the last Commander-in-Chief of the Soviet Air Force from 1991 to 1992 and the first of the Russian Air Force from 1992 to 1998.

== Biography ==
He was born in Morozovsk, Russian SFSR, Soviet Union. In 1997, he was awarded the Hero of the Russian Federation. Deynekin's rank was General of the army. Also he had the federal state civilian service rank of 1st class Active State Councillor of the Russian Federation.

In 1969, he graduated from the Gagarin Air Force Academy.

From 1991 to 1992, he was commander-in-chief of the air force and deputy defense minister of the USSR. In 1992, he served as commander-in-chief of the Air Force of the Commonwealth of Independent States. From 1992 until 1998, he was the commanding officer of the Air Force of the Russian Federation.

He retired in 2002.

Deynekin died on 19 August 2017 in Moscow at the age of 79.

== See also ==
- List of Heroes of the Russian Federation

Military offices
Preceded by Ivan Gorbunov	Commander of Long-Range Aviation; Commander of the 37th Air Army; 1985–1990	Succeeded by Igor Kalugin
Preceded by Yevgeny Shaposhnikov	First Deputy Commander-in-Chief of the Soviet Air Force; 1990–1991	Succeeded by Viktor Kot
Preceded by Yevgeny Shaposhnikov	Commander-in-Chief of the Soviet Air Force; 1991–1992	Branch dissolved
Branch created	Commander-in-Chief of the Russian Air Force; 1992–1998	Succeeded by Anatoly Kornukov
