= Rtishchevo =

Town in Saratov Oblast, Russia

Rtishchevo Ртищево
- Town
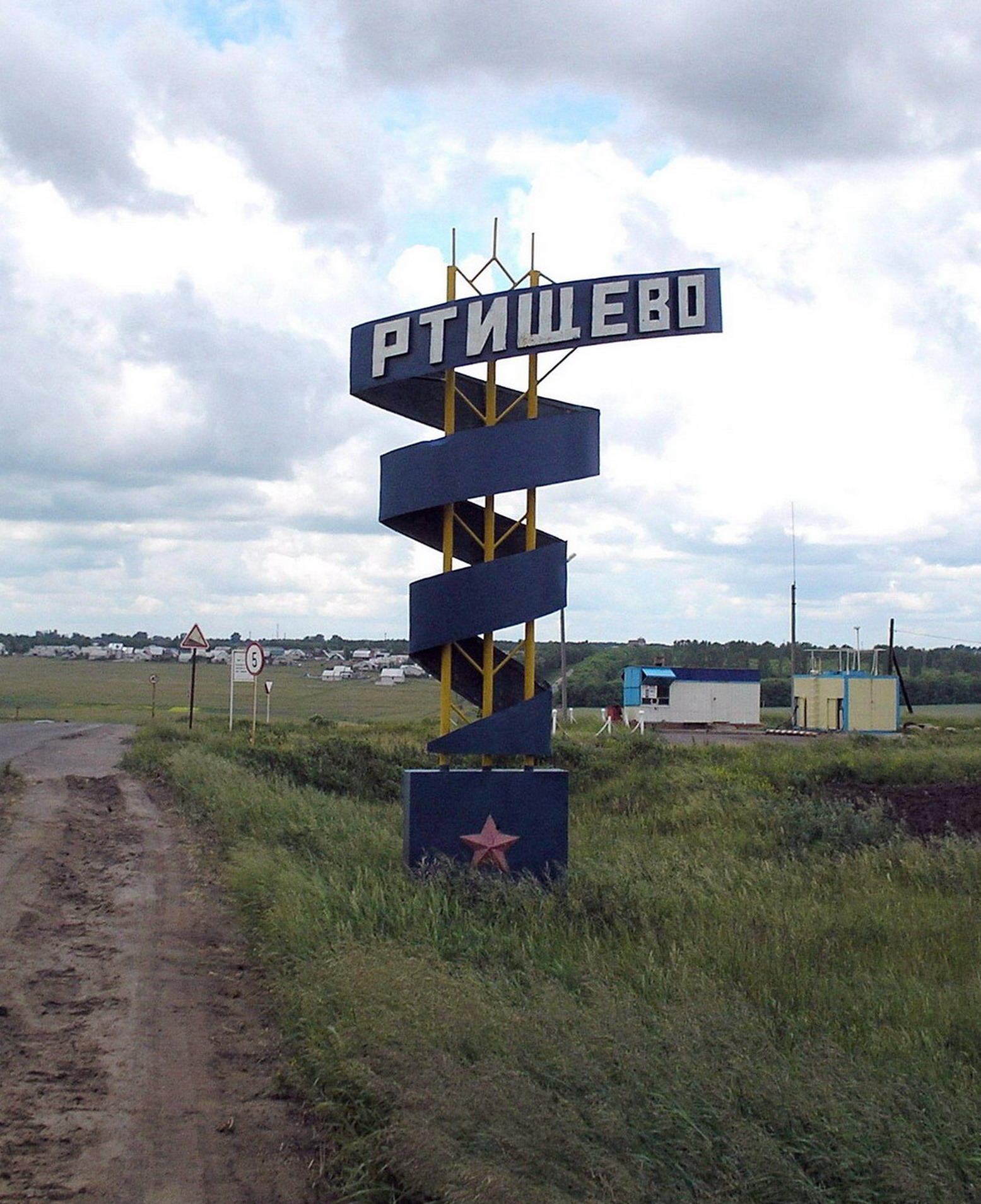
- Entrance to the town from the north

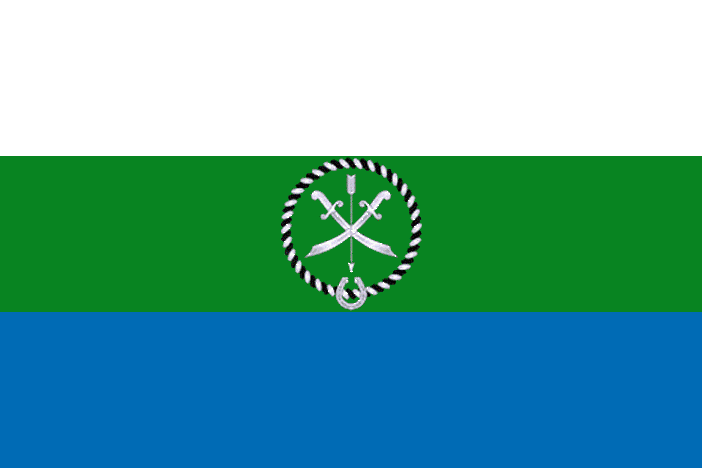
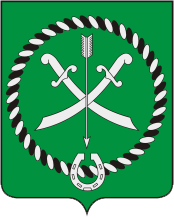
- Flag Coat of arms
- Interactive map of Rtishchevo
- Location of Rtishchevo Rtishchevo (Saratov Oblast)
- Coordinates: 52°16′N 43°46′E
- Country: Russia
- Federal subject: Saratov Oblast
- First mentioned: 1666
- Town status since: 1925

Government
  - Mayor: Alexander Biserov
- Elevation: 210 m (690 ft)

Population (2010 Census)
  - Total: 41,289
  - Estimate (2021): 37,850 (−8.3%)

Administrative status
  - Subordinated to: Rtishchevo Town Under Oblast Jurisdiction
  - Capital of: Rtishchevsky District, Rtishchevo Town Under Oblast Jurisdiction

Municipal status
  - Municipal district: Rtishchevsky Municipal District
  - Urban settlement: Rtishchevo Urban Settlement
  - Capital of: Rtishchevsky Municipal District, Rtishchevo Urban Settlement
- Time zone: UTC+4 (MSK+1)
- Postal code: 412030—412036
- Dialing code: +7 84540
- OKTMO ID: 63641101001

Rtishchevo (Russian: Ртищево, IPA: [ˈrtʲiɕːɪvə]) is a town in Saratov Oblast, Russia, located 214 kilometers (133 mi) west of Saratov, the administrative center of the oblast. Population: 41,289 (2010 census).

== History ==
The village of Rtishchevo was first mentioned in 1666; the modern settlement was built near Rtishchevo railway station in 1871. It was granted town status in 1920.

== Administrative and municipal status ==
Within the framework of administrative divisions, Rtishchevo serves as the administrative center of Rtishchevsky District, even though it is not a part of it. As an administrative division, it is incorporated separately as Rtishchevo Town Under Oblast Jurisdiction—an administrative unit with the status equal to that of the districts. As a municipal division, Rtishchevo Town Under Oblast Jurisdiction is incorporated within Rtishchevsky Municipal District as Rtishchevo Urban Settlement.

== Military ==
It was home to the Rtishchevo air base.

== Population trends ==
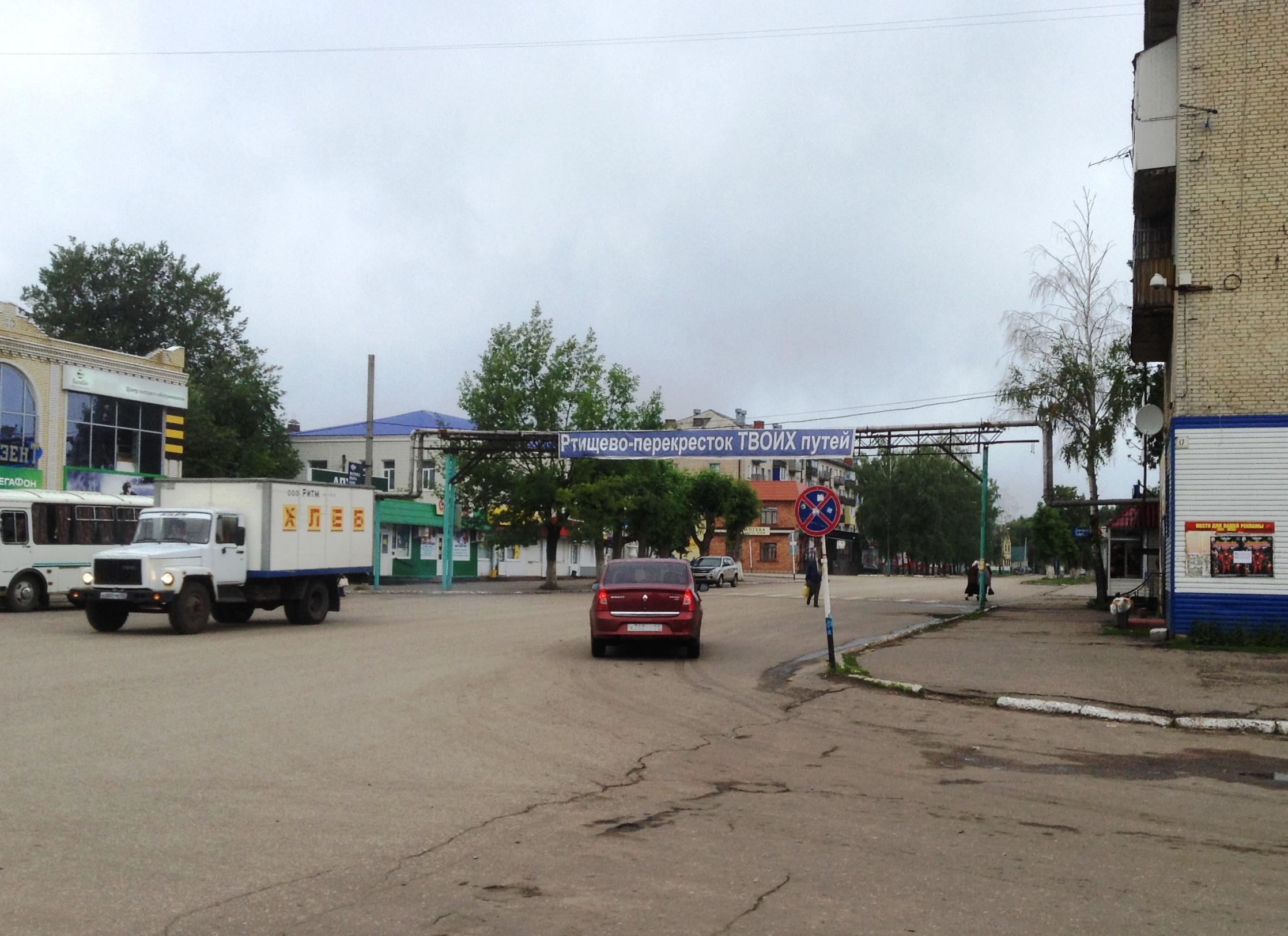
An intersection in Rtishchevo

1875	886	1923	10,800	1940	30,000	1970	37,100	1996	45,100	2005	43,600
1897	~3,000	1926	11,400	1942	28,203	1979	41,100	2000	45,000	2006	43,448
1912	~6,000	1936	23,100	1959	32,700	1989	44,339	2001	44,800	2007	43,300
1917	8,600	1939	24,800	1967	35,800	1989	44,339	2002	44,185	2010	41,289

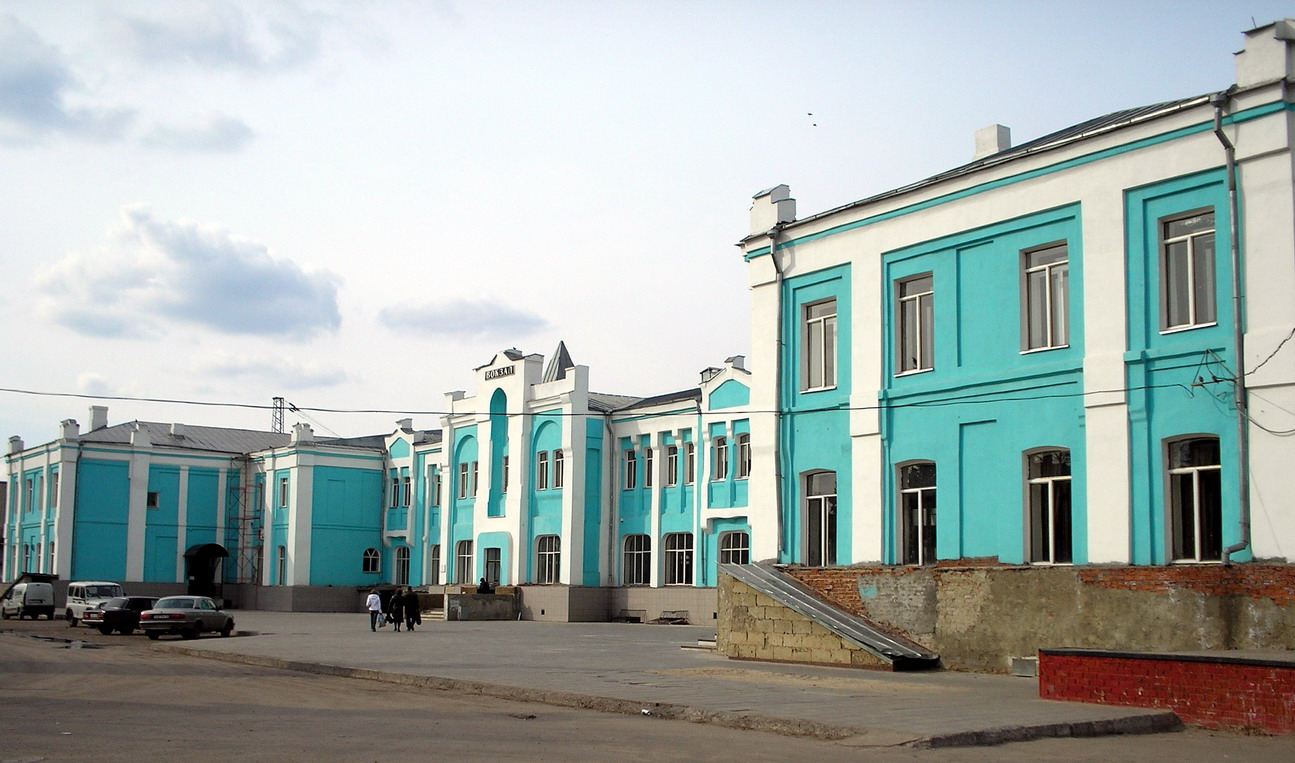
Railway station of Rtishchevo-I
