= Yevgeny Shaposhnikov =

Soviet and Russian military leader and business figure (1942–2020)

- Евгений Шапошников
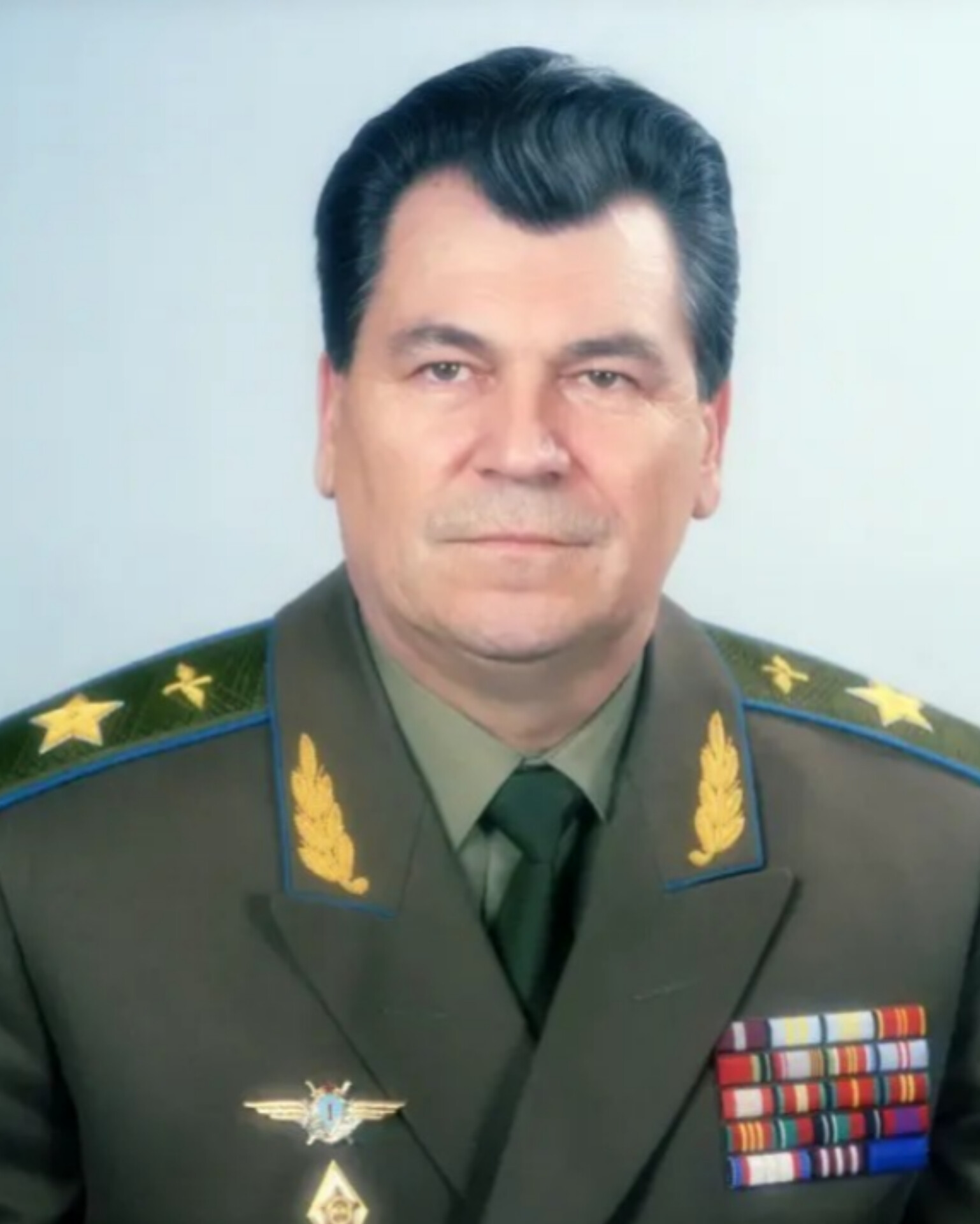

Commander-in-Chief of the United Armed Forces of the Commonwealth of Independent States
- In office 14 February 1992 – 24 September 1993
- Preceded by: Post established
- Succeeded by: Post abolished

Minister of Defence
- In office 29 August 1991 – 14 February 1992
- Premier: Ivan Silayev
- Preceded by: Dmitry Yazov
- Succeeded by: Post abolished

Personal details
- Born: 3 February 1942 Rostov Oblast, Soviet Union
- Died: 8 December 2020 (aged 78) Moscow, Russia
- Resting place: Troyekurovskoye Cemetery, Moscow
- Other political affiliations: Communist Party of the Soviet Union (1963–1991)

Military service
- Allegiance: Soviet Union (to 1991); Russia
- Branch/service: Soviet Air Forces; Russian Air Force
- Years of service: 1963–1993
- Rank: Marshal of the aviation
- Commands: 16th Air Army; Soviet Air Force
- Battles/wars: Soviet–Afghan War

Marshal of Aviation Yevgeny Ivanovich Shaposhnikov (Russian: Евгений Иванович Шапошников; 3 February 1942 – 8 December 2020) was a Soviet Air Forces officer who served as the final Minister of Defense of the Soviet Union in 1991. He was also the Commander-in-Chief of the Soviet Air Forces from 1990 to 1991 and was the Commonwealth of Independent States Joint Forces Commander-in-Chief from 1992 to 1993.

== Early years ==
Shaposhnikov was born on a farm near Aksay in Rostov Oblast, Russia. He graduated from the Kharkov Higher Military Aviation School in 1963 and the Gagarin Air Force Academy in 1969.

== Military career ==
Shaposhnikov joined the Soviet Air Force and rose through the ranks. From March 1985 to June 1987 he commanded the Air Forces of the Odesa Military District. In 1987–1989, Yevgeny Shaposhnikov was the air force commander of the Group of Soviet Forces in Germany (16th Air Army?). In July 1990, he was appointed commander-in-chief of the Soviet Air Force.

== Political career ==
=== Soviet Union ===
In August 1991 – February 1992, Yevgeny Shaposhnikov held the post of Minister of Defence of Soviet Union (and thus the last Soviet Defence Minister). Recognized the Belovezhsky agreement on the termination of the existence of the USSR immediately after its signing on 8 December 1991. On 21 December 1991, simultaneously with the accession of 9 republics to the Commonwealth of Independent States (all, except for Georgia, Moldova, Ukraine and the Baltic republics that previously left the USSR) a protocol was signed on the assignment of temporary command of the Armed Forces of the USSR to Shaposhnikov. Around the end of January 1992, the Ministry of Defense of the disintegrated USSR began to de facto call itself the main command of the CIS Armed Forces. In the Decree of the President of Russia of 4 January 1992, Marshal Shaposhnikov was mentioned as the head of the Ministry of Defense of the former USSR.

=== Commonwealth of Independent States/Russian Federation ===
Only on 14 February 1992 did the Council of CIS Heads of State officially appoint Shaposhnikov Commander-in-Chief of the Joint Armed Forces of the CIS, and only on March 20 of the same year, on the basis of the USSR Ministry of Defense, the General Command of the CIS Joint Armed Forces was officially created.

In June–September 1993, Yevgeny Shaposhnikov held the post of the Secretary of the Security Council of the Russian Federation.

== Business career ==
In January 1994, Shaposhnikov became a representative of the President of the Russian Federation in the main arms-exporting company Rosvooruzhenie. In November 1995 – March 1997 he was the CEO (General Director) of Aeroflot airline company. He has been employed as an adviser of the President of the Russian Federation on matters of aviation and space exploration since March 1997.

== Death ==
Shaposhnikov died on 8 December 2020 in Moscow from COVID-19 during the COVID-19 pandemic in Russia. He was buried in Troyekurovskoye Cemetery on 11 December.

Military offices
Preceded by Alexander Yefimov	Commander-in-Chief of the Soviet Air Force; 1990–1991	Succeeded by Pyotr Deynekin; As Commander-in-Chief of the Russian Air Force
Political offices
Preceded by Dmitry Yazov	Minister of Defence of Soviet Union; 1990–1992	Succeeded by Post Dissolved; Boris Yeltsin as Acting Defense Minister of the Russian Federation
Preceded by Yury Skokov	Secretary of the Security Council of Russia; 1993	Succeeded by Oleg Lobov
