= Medal "For Impeccable Service" =

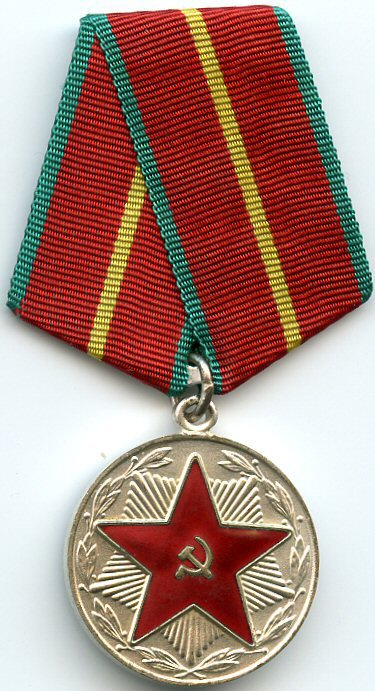
- Medal "For Impeccable Service" 1st class (obverse)
- Type: Long service medal
- Awarded for: Long service in the Soviet Armed Forces
- Presented by: USSR
- Eligibility: Citizens of the Soviet Union
- Status: No longer awarded
- Established: January 25, 1958
- 1st class 2nd class 3rd class Ribbons of the Medal "For Impeccable Service"

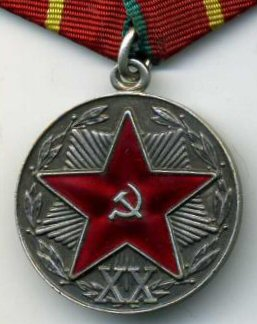
Obverse of the KGB 2nd variant Medal "For Impeccable Service" 1st class

The Medal "For Impeccable Service" (Russian: Медаль «За безупречную службу») was a Soviet military award for long service awarded to deserving members of the military personnel of the Soviet Armed Forces, of the Interior Ministry of the Soviet Union and of the Ministry for the Protection of Public Order of the USSR, to recognise ten, fifteen and twenty years of faithful and impeccable service to the state.

== Medal history ==
Prior to the establishment of the Medal "For Impeccable Service", existing state Orders meant for feats of valour or for extraordinary services to the state were conferred to military personnel for long service. An Order of Lenin for twenty-five years of service, the Order of the Red Banner for twenty, the Order of the Red Star for fifteen, hundreds of thousands of such awards seriously devaluated the awards of the same Orders earned for their original criteria. The intent to encourage the establishment of a ministerial/departmental level medal "For Impeccable Service" was stated in decree of the Presidium of the Supreme Soviet of the USSR of September 14, 1957 emphasising the then devaluation of certain Soviet high military Orders used as long service awards instead of their originally intended criteria. This led to the joint January 25, 1958 decree of the Ministers of Defence, of Internal Affairs and of the Chairman of the Committee on State Security of the USSR establishing the Medal "For Impeccable Service".

The medal was not held in high regard by the troops and the KGB and Interior Ministry of the USSR. The servicemen themselves often called it "For unsuccessful service" (Russian: «За безуспешную службу»). The medal was colloquially called "sand" or "Medal for Sand" (Russian: «медаль за песок»), referring to the natural ageing process of the recipient.

== Medal statute ==
The Medal "For Impeccable Service" was established in three classes. The first class was awarded for twenty years of excellent service, the second class for fifteen and the third class for ten. They were awarded sequentially from the third class to the first class to members of the military personnel of the Ministry of Defence of the USSR, of the Ministry of Internal Affairs of the USSR and to members of the Ministry for the Protection of Public Order.

The Medal "For Impeccable Service" was worn on the left side of the chest and in the presence of other awards of the USSR, was located after them in sequential order from the first to the third class. If worn in the presence of Orders or medals of the Russian Federation, the latter have precedence.

== Medal description ==
The Medal "For Impeccable Service" was a 32-millimetre-diameter circular medal with a raised rim on both the obverse and reverse. On the obverse at center, the relief outline of a large five-pointed star with the hammer and sickle at its center, between the arms, rays radiating at an obtuse angle forming a point. Along the circumference of the medal, passing between the raised rim and the points of the star, a laurel wreath. This design was common to all three services bestowing it, Defence, Interior and the KGB, the only exception being the second variant of the medal bestowed by the KGB, which bore the Roman numerals "XX", "XV" or "X" in the lower part of the obverse, between the lower rays of the star.

On the reverse of the Defence Ministry medal, the circular relief inscription along the upper medal circumference, "ARMED FORCES" (Russian: «ВООРУЖЕННЫЕ СИЛЫ»), at the bottom, the inscription "USSR" (Russian: «СССР»). In the center, the relief inscription on four lines "FOR (10, 15 or 20) YEARS OF IMPECCABLE SERVICE" (Russian: «ЗА (10, 15, 20) ЛЕТ БЕЗУПРЕЧНОЙ СЛУЖБЫ») over a small five pointed star.

On the reverse of the Interior Ministry medal, at the top, a small relief five-pointed star, at the bottom, the inscription "MVD USSR" (Russian: «МВД СССР»). In the center, the relief inscription on three lines "FOR (10, 15 or 20) YEARS OF IMPECCABLE SERVICE" (Russian: «ЗА (10, 15, 20) ЛЕТ БЕЗУПРЕЧНОЙ СЛУЖБЫ»).

On the reverse of the Ministry for the Protection of Public Order medal, at the top, a small relief five-pointed star, at the bottom, the inscription "MOOP" (Russian: «МООП»). In the center, the relief inscription on three lines "FOR (10, 15 or 20) YEARS OF IMPECCABLE SERVICE" (Russian: «ЗА (10, 15, 20) ЛЕТ БЕЗУПРЕЧНОЙ СЛУЖБЫ»).

The first-class medal was initially struck from silver; after 1965 it was constructed of silver-plated brass. The central star on its obverse was enamelled in red. The second-class medal from its inception was also constructed from silver-plated brass, with the exception of the central star on its obverse (which was left bare). The third-class medal was always struck from solid brass.

First-Class Obverse	First-Class Reverse	Second-Class Obverse	Second-Class Reverse	Third-Class Obverse	Third-Class Reverse
Common	Ministry for the Protection of Public Order	Common	Interior Ministry	Common	Armed Forces

There are other lower reverse inscriptions from multiple variants of various Soviet republics, these are a sample of the many, (Russian: «МВД БССР») MVD of the Belarus SSR, (Russian: «МВД УССР») MVD of the Ukrainian SSR, (Russian: «МВД КАЗ») MVD of Kazakhstan, (Russian: «МООП РСФСР») Ministry for the Protection of Public Order of the Russian SFSR, (Russian: «МООП БССР») Ministry for the Protection of Public Order of the Belarus SSR, (Russian: «МООП ГССР») Ministry for the Protection of Public Order of the Georgian SSR.

The Medal "For Impeccable Service" was secured by a ring through the medal suspension loop to a standard Soviet pentagonal mount covered by a 24-millimetre-wide red silk moiré ribbon with 2-millimetre-wide green edge stripes. The ribbon for the medal 1st class had a single 2-millimetre-wide central yellow stripe; the ribbon for the medal 2nd class and two 2-millimetre-wide central yellow stripes 2 mm apart; the ribbon for the medal 3rd class had three 2-millimetre-wide central yellow stripes 2 mm apart.

== Recipients (partial list) ==
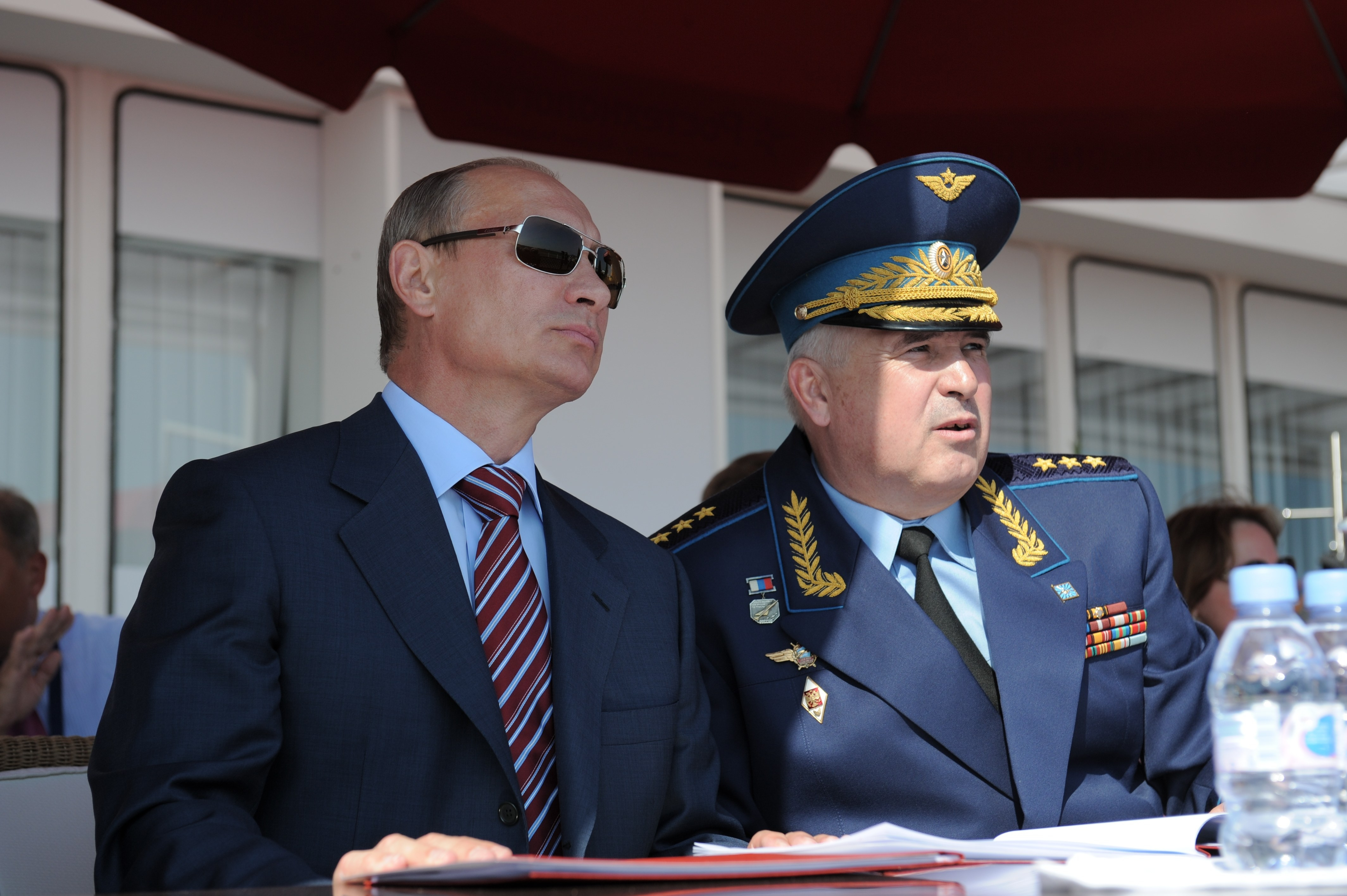
Russian Air Force commander Colonel General Alexander Zelin, a recipient of the Soviet medals "For Impeccable Service" 2nd and 3rd classes, pictured in company of President Vladimir Putin.

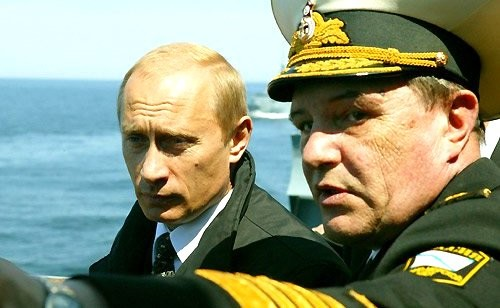
Admiral of the Fleet Vladimir Kuroyedov, a recipient of all three classes of the Soviet medal "For Impeccable Service".

The individuals below were all recipients of the Medal "For Impeccable Service".

- Colonel Yuri Alekseyevich Gagarin
- Major Pavel Ivanovich Belyayev
- Major General Vladimir Sergeyevich Ilyushin
- Lieutenant General Ruslan Sultanovich Aushev
- Marshal of the Soviet Union Sergey Fyodorovich Akhromeyev
- MVD Army General Rashid Gumarovich Nurgaliyev
- Admiral Vladimir Grigor'evich Yegorov
- Colonel General Gennady Nikolayevich Troshev
- Lieutenant General Vladimir Anatolyevich Shamanov
- Army General Viktor Germanovich Kazantsev
- Marshal of the Soviet Union Nikolai Vasilyevich Ogarkov
- Marshal of the Soviet Union Sergei Leonidovich Sokolov
- Major General Timur Avtandilovich Apakidze
- Colonel General Boris Vsevolodovich Gromov
- Admiral of the Fleet Vladimir Ivanovich Kuroyedov
- Army General Mukhtar Altynbayev
- Colonel General Nikolay Nikolayevich Bordyuzha
- Colonel General Alexander Nikolayevich Zelin
- Colonel Vladimir Vasilievich Kvachkov
- Colonel Volodymyr Mykolaiovych Melnykov
- MVD Army General Anatoly Sergeevich Kulikov
- Army General Anatoly Mikhaïlovich Kornukov
- Colonel General Arkady Viktotovich Bakhin
- Vladimir Nesterov, Director of the Khrunichev State Research and Production Space Center
- Colonel General Mikhail Ivanovich Barsukov
- Colonel Ivan Fedorovich Ladyga
- Army General Sagadat Kozhahmetovich Nurmagambetov
- Major General Igor Dmitrievich Sergun
- Lieutenant Colonel Anatoly Vyacheslavovich Lebed
- Brigadier General Victor Gaiciuc

== See also ==
- Orders, decorations, and medals of the Soviet Union
- Badges and Decorations of the Soviet Union
- Red Army
- Soviet Navy
- MVD
- KGB
