= Andrey Sergeyev =

Soviet air pilot and commander

Andrey Segeyev
- Russian: Андре́й Васи́льевич Серге́ев
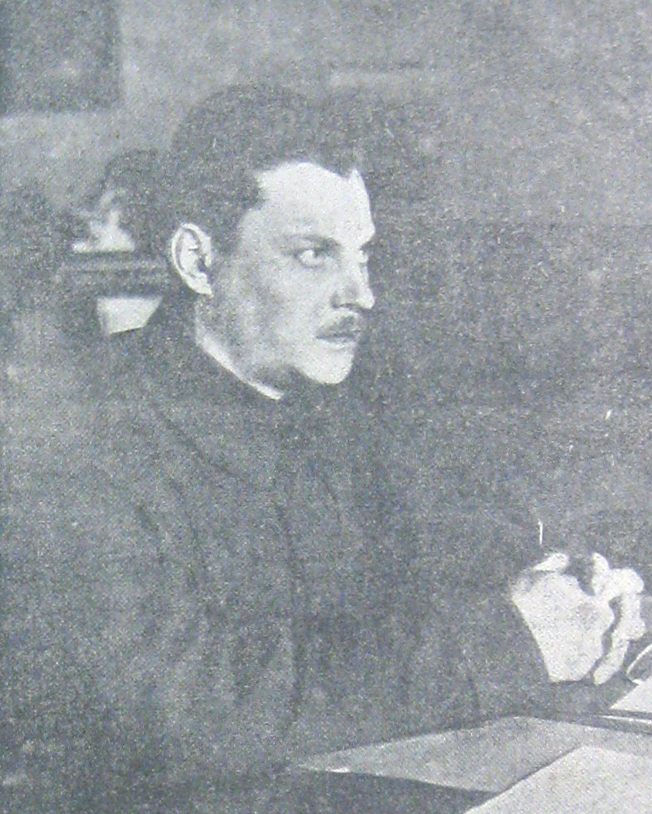
- Sergeyev in 1920
- Born: 1893; Gdovsky Uyezd, Saint Petersburg Governorate, Russian Empire
- Died: 5 September 1933 (aged 39–40)
- Burial place: Novodevichy Cemetery
- Military career
- Allegiance: Soviet Union
- Branch: Soviet Air Force
- Service years: 1915–1933
- Rank: Colonel
- Commands: Soviet Air Forces
- Conflicts: World War I Russian Civil War
- Awards: Order of the Red Banner

Andrei Vasilyevich Sergeyev (Petrov-Sergeev) (Russian: Андре́й Васи́льевич Серге́ев; 1893 – 5 September 1933) was a Soviet air pilot and commander. He was one of the first organizers of the Soviet Air Force.

== Biography ==
Sergeyev graduated from the courses of aviation mechanics and theoretical courses for pilots at the Petrograd Polytechnic Institute. He was in military service from February 1, 1915, where he was transferred to the 1st aviation company. On January 27, 1916, he was sent to the Sevastopol Aviation School, from which he graduated in 1916. He served as a pilot in the 7th Siberian squadron. Sergeyev was a member of the Russian Social Democratic Labour Party from 1911.

On April 18, 1917, Sergeyev was elected a delegate to the 1st All-Russian Congress of Pilots, where he joined the Organizing Committee for the convening of the All-Russian Congress of All Aviation Figures. At the 1st All-Russian Aviation Congress he was elected to the Aviation Council. From December 1917 to May 1918, he was a member of the All-Russian Collegium for the Control of the Air Fleet and from May 24 he was Commissar of the Main Directorate of the Workers' and Peasants' Red Air Fleet. He Chief Commissar of Aviation of the Eastern Front, from September 22, 1918, and Head of the Field Directorate of Aviation and Aeronautics at the Field Headquarters of the Revolutionary Military Council of the Soviet republics (Aviadarm).

He was assistant chief of the GUVF of the Red Army for land aviation. From August 1921 to October 1922, he served as chief of the GUVF of the Red Army (Glavvozdukhflot), thus being the head of all the Air Forces of the Red Army.

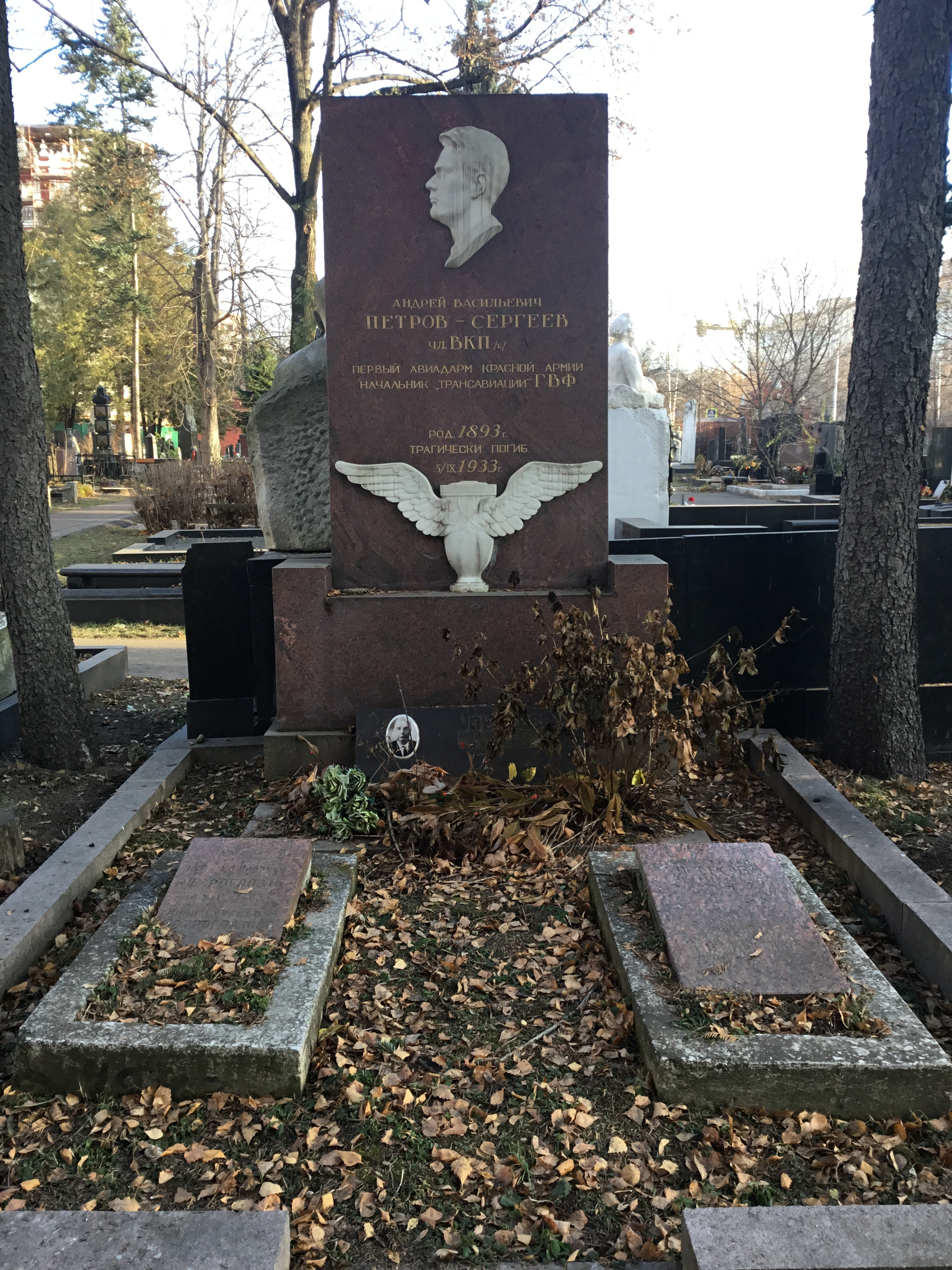
Grave of Andrey Segeyev in the Novodevichy Cemetery

In 1926 he graduated from the Air Force Academy of the Red Army, then he was sent to work abroad. In 1933 he was appointed head of transport aviation of the Soviet Union and deputy head of the GUGVF under the Council of People's Commissars. Sergeyev died in a plane crash in 1933. His remains were buried at the Novodevichy Cemetery.
