= Konstantin Akashev =

Soviet Belarusian revolutionary and aviator

- Константи́н Васи́льевич Ака́шев
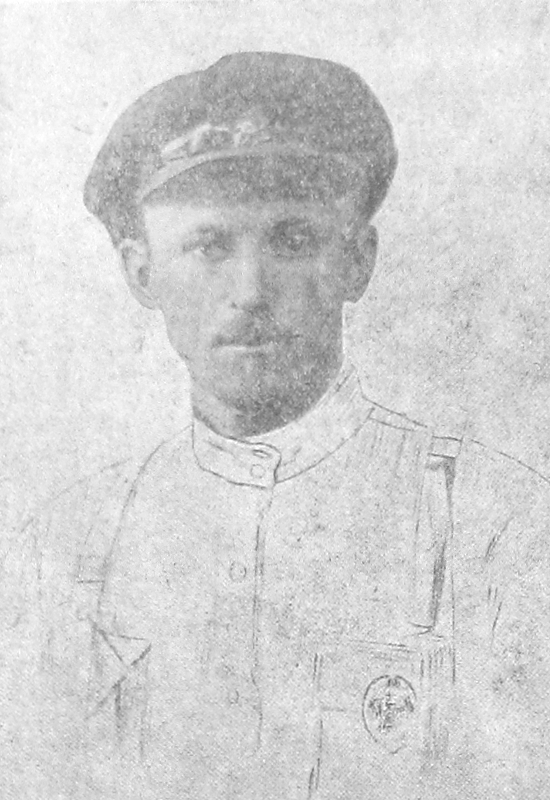
- Portrait of Akashev Published in the journal "Bulletin of the Air Fleet", 1920
- Born: 22 October 1888; Lyutsinskiy Uyezd, Vitebsk Governorate, Russian Empire (now Belarus)
- Died: 9 April 1931 (aged 42); Moscow, Russian Soviet Federative Socialist Republic, Soviet Union
- Military career
- Allegiance: Soviet Union
- Branch: Soviet Air Forces
- Service years: 1915–1931
- Rank: Colonel
- Commands: Soviet Air Forces
- Conflicts: World War I Russian Civil War

Konstantin Vasilyevich Akashev (Russian: Константи́н Васи́льевич Ака́шев; 22 October 1888 – 9 April 1931) was a Belarusian revolutionary and aviator who became the first Chief Commander of the Soviet Air Forces.

== Biography ==
Akashev was a member of an anarcho-communist group in Kiev from a young age. Following his participation in a failed attempt to assassinate Russian Prime Minister Pyotr Stolypin, Akashev went into exile from Russia in 1908, spending time in Italy and France. He completed training as a pilot at the Caproni School of Aviation, Italy in 1911. He moved to France where he gained an engineering diploma from the Higher Institute of Aviation and Mechanics in 1914, and attended the Military Aviation School in 1915.

Akashev volunteered to serve in the French air forces when the First World War broke out, but in 1915 he returned to Russia. He worked in an aircraft factory as his past activities as a revolutionary prevented him being posted to active duty. In 1917, he participated in the October Revolution in Petrograd and became Commissar of the All-Russia Collegium for Direction of the Air Forces of the Old Army, when it was founded on December 20, 1917. When the Soviet Air Force was re-organised into the "Main Directorate of the Workers and Peasants Red Air Fleet (Glavvozdukhoflot)" in May–June, 1918 Akashev was retained as Commissar, becoming the military commander in July of that year. He fought at the front during the Russian Civil War, commanding the Air Flotilla of the Eastern Front's 5th Army at Kazan.

During June–December, 1919, Akashev was Chief of Aviation and Aeronautics for the Southern Front. During August–September, 1919, he commanded an air group formed to combat the cavalry of General Konstantin Mamontov that was fighting in the Soviet rear areas. He personally flew the Sikorsky Ilya Muromets, bombing the enemy cavalry.

From March, 1920-February, 1921, Akashev again served primarily as the commander of the Soviet air forces.

In 1922 Akashev attended the international aviation conferences in London and Rome, and gave expert advice on aviation for the Genoa Conference.

Akashev later served in management roles at aviation factories in Leningrad and Moscow. He was accused of spying and arrested without grounds on March 3, 1930. He was executed on September 4, 1931.

He was rehabilitated in 1956.
