= Honoured Military Pilot of the Russian Federation =

Honorary title Merited Military Pilot of the Russian Federation
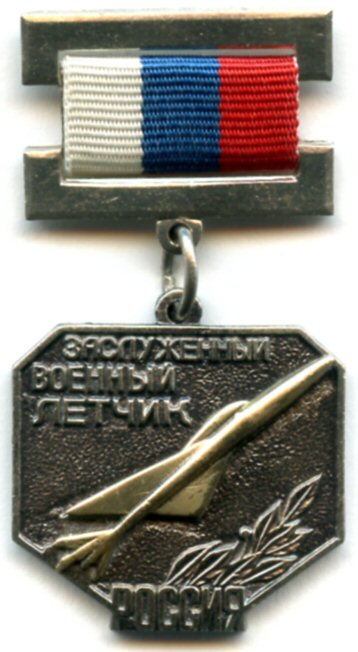
- Obverse of the chest badge "Merited Military Pilot of the Russian Federation"
- Type: Honorary title
- Awarded for: Excellence in military aviation airmanship
- Presented by: Russian Federation
- Eligibility: Citizens of the Russian Federation
- Status: Active
- Established: March 20, 1992
- Related: Merited Military Navigator of the Russian Federation

The Honorary Title of "Merited Military Pilot of the Russian Federation" (Russian: Заслуженный военный лётчик Российской Федерации) is a state award of the Russian Federation that can trace its history to the Soviet Era. It was initially established on January 26, 1965 by Decree of the Presidium of the Supreme Soviet № 3230-VI as the honorary title of "Merited Military Pilot of the USSR" (Russian: Заслуженный военный лётчик СССР). Following the dissolution of the Soviet Union in 1991, the title was retained by the Law of the Russian Federation 2555-1 dated March 20, 1992 and renamed "Merited Military Pilot of the Russian Federation".

== Award statute ==
The honorary title of "Merited Military Pilot of the Russian Federation" is awarded to members of military flying units, military agencies, military schools, military organizations and other military or federal authorities, having qualified military pilots 1st class or military pilot-instructors 1st class, for outstanding achievements in the development of aviation technology, high performance in education and training of flight personnel and long-term trouble-free flight operations in military aviation.

The President of the Russian Federation is the main conferring authority of the award based on recommendations from the Ministry of Defence of the Russian Federation.

The "Merited Military Pilot of the Russian Federation" chest badge is worn on the right side of the chest and in the presence of other orders, placed over them.

== Award description ==
The honorary title of "Merited Military Pilot of the Russian Federation" is a 27mm wide by 23mm high silver and nickel polygon with raised edges. At the top of the obverse, the relief inscription in three lines covered to the left "MERITED MILITARY PILOT" (Russian: ЗАСЛУЖЕННЫЙ ВОЕННЫЙ ЛËТЧИК), in the center, the gilt tombac image of a jet plane climbing diagonally towards the right its nose and tail slightly protruding over the edges, at the bottom, the relief inscription "RUSSIA" (Russian: РОССИЯ) superimposed over a laurel branch.

The insignia is secured to a standard Russian square mount by a silver-plated ring through the suspension loop. The mount is covered by a silk moiré tricolour ribbon of white, blue and red.

== Notable recipients ==
- Major General Timur Avtandilovich Apakidze
- Colonel General Alexander Nikolayevich Zelin
- Colonel Igor Valentinovitch Tkachenko
- Marshal of Aviation Yevgeny Ivanovich Shaposhnikov
- Colonel General Nikolai Timofeyevich Antoshkin

== See also ==
- Merited Military Pilot of the USSR
- Awards and decorations of the Russian Federation
- Russian Air Force
- Honorary titles of Russia
