= Balashov air base =

Airport in Saratov Oblast, Russia

Balashov
- Balashov, Saratov Oblast in Russia
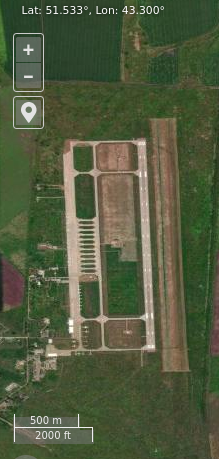
- Satellite imagery of Balashov air base

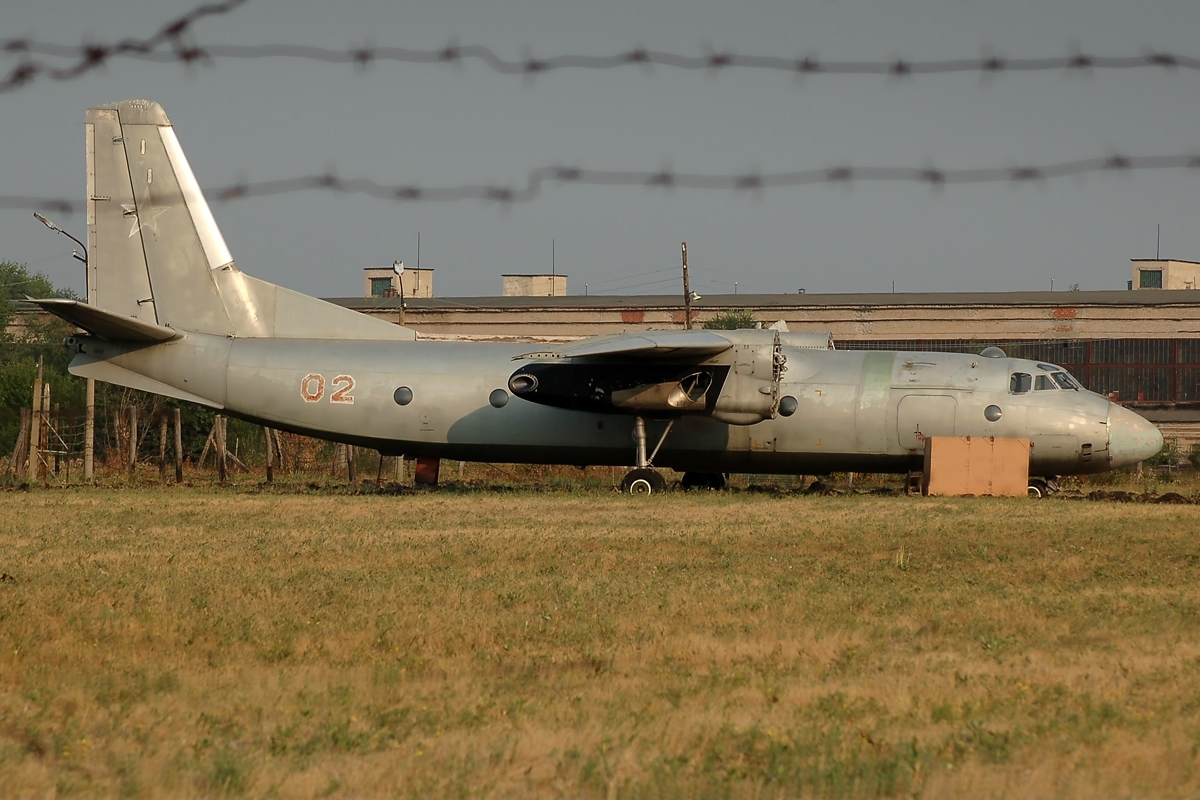

Site information
- Type: Air Base
- Owner: Ministry of Defence
- Operator: Russian Aerospace Forces

Location
- Shown within Saratov Oblast Balashov (Russia)
- Coordinates: 51°32′0″N 43°18′0″E

Site history
- In use: -present

Airfield information
- Identifiers: ICAO: UWSW
- Elevation: 173 metres (568 ft) AMSL
Runways
Direction	Length and surface
17/35	2,000 metres (6,562 ft) Concrete

Balashov (also Balashov Southeast, Balasov) is an air base in Russia located 9 km east of Balashov, Saratov Oblast.

The base is home to the 606th Training Aviation Regiment of the 785th Aviation Training Center for Long-Range and Military Transport Aviation. It flies the Antonov An-26.

Michael Holm's data as of 2011 appears to suggest that Balashov as of 1990 was home to the 606th Training Aviation Regiment of the Balashov Higher Military Aviation School for Pilots, subordinated to the Air Forces of the Volga-Ural Military District. The Balashov School dates to the 1930s.

On the morning of May 30, 2017, an An-26 aircraft with the crew of the 6th Aviation Faculty of the Zhukovsky – Gagarin Air Force Academy (consisting of five crew members and one cadet) performed a training flight in a circle. When landing at the Balashov airfield, the plane crashed, colliding with the surface of the earth 150 meters from the threshold of the runway. While moving on the ground, the plane collapsed, ignited and partially burned. The crew members received injuries of varying severity, the cadet died. The aircraft was lost. The most likely reason for the crash appeared to be engine failure.

== See also ==
- List of military airbases in Russia
