= Military history of the Russian Federation =

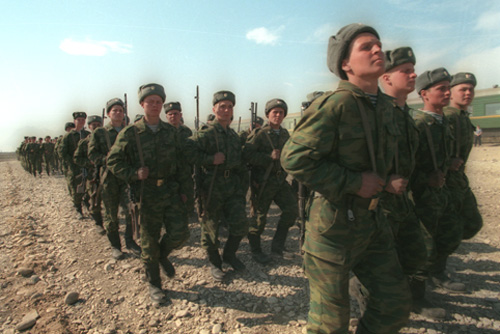
Russian troops in Chechnya in 2000

The military history of the Russian Federation began with the establishment of the Russian Armed Forces following the dissolution of the Soviet Union. This was followed by its engagements in post-Soviet conflicts, from the war in Transnistria that started in 1990, after which many reforms were put in place during the late 1990s and the 2000s. Recently, the Russian military invaded Georgia in 2008 and Ukraine in 2014 and 2022, and intervened in the Syrian Civil War in 2015.

== Origins of the Russian Armed Forces ==
The Soviet Union officially dissolved on 25 December 1991. For the next year various attempts to keep its unity and to transform it into the United Armed Forces of the Commonwealth of Independent States (CIS) failed. Over time, some units stationed in the newly independent republics swore loyalty to their new national governments, while a series of treaties between the newly independent states divided up the military's assets.

After signing the Belavezha Accords, at a later summit in Kazakhstan on 21 December 1991, the countries of the newly formed CIS signed a protocol on the temporary appointment of Marshal of Aviation Yevgeny Shaposhnikov as Minister of Defence and commander-in-chief of the armed forces in their territory, including strategic nuclear forces. On 14 February 1992 Shaposhnikov formally became Supreme Commander (or Commander-in-Chief) of the CIS Armed Forces. On 16 March 1992 a decree by Boris Yeltsin created the Armed Forces of the Russian Federation; the operational control of Allied High Command; and the Ministry of Defence, which was headed by the president. Finally, on 7 May 1992, Yeltsin signed a decree establishing the armed forces and Yeltsin assumed the duties of the Supreme Commander. In May 1992, General Colonel Pavel Grachev became the minister of defence, and was made Russia's first Army General on assuming the post. At about this time Shaposhnikov "and a skeletal staff to support his role as commander of the CIS Armed Forces were evicted from the MoD and General Staff buildings and given offices in the former.. Warsaw Pact headquarters on the northern outskirts of Moscow" (on Prospekt Mira). Shaposhnikov's staff quickly became a very weak body as the new states' authorities asserted their control over their own armed forces. On 15 June 1993 Shaposhnikov's staff was abolished and replace with a scaled down Joint Staff for Coordinating Military Cooperation. Shaposhnikov resigned, to be replaced by Colonel General Viktor Samsonov, until October 1996. Army General Vladimir Yakovlev (general) appears to have become Chief of the Staff in June 2001.

In the next few years, Russian forces withdrew from central and eastern Europe, as well as from some newly independent post-Soviet republics. While in most places the withdrawal took place without any problems, the Russian Armed Forces remained in some disputed areas such as the Sevastopol naval base in the Crimea as well as in Abkhazia, South Ossetia and in Transnistria. The Armed Forces have several bases in foreign countries, especially on territory of the former Soviet Republics.

A new military doctrine, promulgated in November 1993, implicitly acknowledged the contraction of the old Soviet Armed Forces into a regional military power. Among the most disturbing features of the new military doctrine were “a growing insistence on the right to ignore the sovereignty of now independent former Soviet republics and to intervene in the FSU where and when it suits. The Army, and perhaps the government and people of Russia, simply do not accept that such states are fully independent..” There was an assumption, implicit in many elements of the new doctrine, that "the Armed Forces [could] continue to spend according to their perception of need rather than what the economy can afford.” In keeping with its emphasis on the threat of regional conflicts, the doctrine called for a smaller, lighter, and more mobile Russian military, with a higher degree of professionalism and with greater rapid-deployment capability. Such change proved extremely difficult to achieve.

== Post-Soviet conflicts, 1990-2000 ==
=== Early post-Soviet conflicts, 1990–1992 ===
After the dissolution of the Soviet Union, Boris Yeltsin pursued partnership with the West. The new military doctrine was to establish itself as a regional force instead of focusing on global domination. During those years Russian troops fought in a series of conflicts called the southern wars. These included armed conflicts in Transnistria, South Ossetia, Abkhazia, Tajikistan, and Dagestan.

The Transnistria War was an armed conflict that broke out on 2 November 1990 in Dubăsari between pro-Transnistria (PMR) forces, including the Transnistrian Republican Guard, militia and neo-Cossack units (which were supported by elements of the Russian 14th Army); and pro-Moldovan forces, including Moldovan troops and police. Although the Russian Army officially took the position of neutrality and non-involvement, many of its officers were sympathetic towards the fledgling Pridnestrovian Moldavian Republic (PMR) and some even defected in order to help the Transnistrian side openly. ROG Parcani sapper battalion, under the orders of General Butkevich, went over to the Transnistrian side. This battalion later destroyed the bridges at Dubăsari, Gura Bâcului-Bâcioc and Coșnița. Moldovan forces used aircraft in the village of Parcani and shelled the ROG station there which meant engaging not just Transnistrian but also Russian forces.

The South Ossetia War was fought between Georgian government forces and ethnic Georgian militias on one side and the forces of South Ossetian separatists and Russia on the other.

=== Russian constitutional crisis, 1993 ===
The 1993 Russian constitutional crisis was a political stand-off between the Russian president Boris Yeltsin and the Supreme Soviet of Russia that was resolved by military force. The relations between the president and the parliament had been deteriorating for some time. The power struggle reached its crisis on 21 September 1993, when President Yeltsin intended to dissolve the country's highest body (Congress of People's Deputies) and parliament (Supreme Soviet), although the constitution did not give the president the power to do so. Yeltsin justified his orders by the results of the referendum of April 1993.

In response, the parliament declared the president's decision null and void, impeached Yeltsin and proclaimed vice president Aleksandr Rutskoy to be acting president of Russia. On 3 October, demonstrators removed militia cordons around the parliament and, urged by their leaders, took over the mayor's offices and tried to storm the Ostankino television centre. The army, which had initially declared its neutrality, stormed the Supreme Soviet building in the early morning hours of 4 October by Yeltsin's order, and arrested the leaders of the resistance. At the climax of the crisis, Russia was thought by some to be "on the brink" of civil war. The ten-day conflict became the deadliest single event of street fighting in Moscow's history since the Russian Revolution.

=== First Chechen War, 1994–1996 ===
The First Chechen War was a rebellion by the Chechen Republic of Ichkeria against the Russian Federation, fought from December 1994 to August 1996. The first war was preceded by the Russian Intervention in Ichkeria, in which Russia tried to covertly overthrow the Ichkerian government. After the initial campaign of 1994–1995, culminating in the devastating Battle of Grozny, Russian federal forces attempted to seize control of the mountainous area of Chechnya but were set back by Chechen guerrilla warfare and raids on the flatlands despite Russia's overwhelming advantages in firepower, manpower, weaponry, artillery, combat vehicles, airstrikes and air support. The resulting widespread demoralization of federal forces and the almost universal opposition of the Russian public to the conflict led Boris Yeltsin's government to declare a ceasefire with the Chechens in 1996 and sign a peace treaty a year later.

The official figure for Russian military deaths is 5,732, while most estimates put the number between 3,500 and 7,500, or even as high as 14,000. Although there are no accurate figures for the number of Chechen forces killed, various estimates put the number at about 3,000 to 17,391 dead or missing. Various figures estimate the number of civilian deaths at between 30,000 and 100,000 killed and possibly over 200,000 injured, while more than 500,000 people were displaced by the conflict, which left cities and villages across the republic in ruins. The conflict led to a significant decrease of non-Chechen population due to violence and discrimination.

=== Second Chechen War, 1999–2000 ===
The Second Chechen War was an armed conflict in Chechnya and the border regions of the North Caucasus between the Russian Federation and the Chechen Republic of Ichkeria, fought from August 1999 to April 2000. In August 1999, Islamist fighters from Chechnya infiltrated Russia's Dagestan region, declaring it an independent state and calling for holy war. During the initial campaign, Russian military and pro-Russian Chechen paramilitary forces faced Chechen separatists in open combat and seized the Chechen capital Grozny after a winter siege that lasted from December 1999 until February 2000.

Russia established direct rule over Chechnya in May 2000 although Chechen militant resistance throughout the North Caucasus region continued to inflict heavy Russian casualties and challenge Russian political control over Chechnya for several years. Both sides carried out attacks against civilians. These attacks drew international condemnation. In mid-2000, the Russian government transferred certain military responsibilities to pro-Russian Chechen forces. The military phase of operations was terminated in April 2002, and the coordination of the field operations were given first to the Federal Security Service and then to the Ministry of Internal Affairs in the summer of 2003. On 16 April 2009, the counter-terrorism operation in Chechnya was officially ended.

The exact death toll of the conflict is unknown. Russian casualties are around 7,500 (official Russian casualty figures) or about 14,000 according to the Committee of Soldiers' Mothers. Unofficial sources estimate a range of 25,000 to 50,000 dead or missing, mostly Chechen civilians.

== Reforms ==
In "..1991 Russia inherited a military manning system that predated the Soviet era, based on conscription and mass mobilization. Key characteristics of this system included a large standing army, no professional enlisted cadre beyond warrant officers, entrenched organizational corruption, vicious and ritualized hazing (dedovshschina), a relationship between officers and conscripts resembling that of master and serf, and a rigid, highly centralized planning and command philosophy."

Under Pavel Grachev, Defence Minister from 1992 to 1996, little military reform took place, though there was a plan to create more deployable mobile forces. The number of brigades in the Ground Forces as opposed to divisions grew greatly, however. Later Defence Minister Rodionov (in office 1996–1997) had good qualifications but did not manage to institute lasting change. At the start of his term, he appeared to be convinced of fitting the Army to the state; eventually he was dismissed because he would not foreswear fitting the state to the Army. His attitude was revealed in comments such as "it is.. impermissible to solve society's.. problems at the cost of lowering the state's main attribute, the army." Only under Defence Minister Igor Sergeyev, in office 1997–2001, did a certain amount of limited reform begin, though attention focused upon the Strategic Rocket Forces.

The General Staff appears to have had little or no wish to move towards using contract servicemen as well as conscripts. Russian troops in Siberia were fed animal feed, and soldiers sold equipment, including weapons, for money.

=== 1997–1999 military reform ===
The reform established two categories of military units: 1) constant combat readiness units manned to wartime standards; 2) short staffed units manned to peacetime standards (30-70% of wartime standards). By 2003, however, even constant combat readiness units, however, needed additional resources to perform their missions properly. The remaining units were transformed into weapons and military equipment storage bases (VkhVTs). The Space Forces were incorporated into the Strategic Rocket Forces. Space Missile Defence Forces were separated from the Air Defence Forces and incorporated into Strategic Rocket Forces.

The rest of the Air Defence Forces were incorporated into the Air Force. Transbaikal Military District was abolished, its territory was divided between Siberian Military District and Far Eastern Military District. Some military academies were disestablished. The total number of military personnel was reduced to 1.2 million troops. The possibility of the recruitment of volunteers for enlisted personnel and non-commissioned officers positions was provided but in fact these positions were filled by conscripts, as before.

Many of these organisational changes were incorporated into the "Plan for Armed Forces Structuring to 2005," which as reported in September 2000 also significantly reduced the number of service personnel, and reestablished the Main Command of Ground Forces.

=== 2001–2004 military reform ===
In 2001, Sergei Ivanov was appointed by Vladimir Putin as the minister of defence. Ivanov pushed to initiate reforms which were completed in 2004. Constant combat readiness military units, staffed with volunteers only, were established but conscription was retained. After a period of attempting to work with the West on security issues, by 2003 the Russian Defence Ministry increased the military budget fourfold, and issued a white paper establishing that the United States was the country's main security threat. As of 2008, there were 20% constant combat readiness military units, manned to wartime standards, and 80% cadre military units, manned to peacetime standards, in Russian Armed Forces.

=== 2008 military reform ===
After the Russo-Georgian War in August 2008, it became clear that Russian military organization needed further reform; as Vladimir Shamanov said, cadre regiments and divisions, intended for receiving mobilization resources and deployment in the period immediately preceding the outbreak of war, had become a costly relic. Overall performance of Russian forces in the Russo-Georgian War was poor and unsatisfactory, with Russian forces suffering from bad coordination, malfunctioning equipment, and friendly fire. In response, significant reforms called "New Look" were announced on 14 October 2008 by minister of defence Anatoliy Serdyukov. Major structural reorganisation began in 2009.

Key elements of the reforms announced in October 2008 included reducing the armed forces to a strength of one million by 2012 (instead of the originally planned 2016); reducing the number of officers; centralising officer training from 65 military schools into 10 "systemic" military training centres; reducing the size of the central command; introducing more civilian logistics and auxiliary staff; elimination of cadre-strength formations; reorganising the reserves; reorganising the army into a brigade system; and reorganising air forces into an air-base system instead of regiments.

The main organizational change was the transition from a 4-level operational chain of command (Military District - Army - Division - Regiment) to a 3-level one (Military District - Operational Command (Army) - Brigade). Also Russia fully refused cadre military units, manned to peacetime standards (so-called "paper divisions"), and since that time only constant combat readiness military units, 100% manned up to wartime standards, were part of Russian Armed Forces.

On 31 October 2010, Anatoly Serdyukov stated that changes in organizational-regular structure was completed.

On 17 October 2012 the head of the State Duma's Defence Committee told RIA Novosti that Russia planned to boost annual defense spending by 59 percent to almost 3 trillion rubles ($83.3 billion) in 2015 up from $61 billion in 2012. "Targeted national defence spending as a percentage of GDP will amount to 3.2 percent in 2013, 3.4 percent in 2014 and 3.7 percent in 2015", Defence Committee chairman Vladimir Komoedov is quoted as saying in the committee's conclusion on the draft budget for 2013–2015.

The number of military units is to be reduced in accordance with the table:

| Arms and branches | 2008 | 2012 | Reduction |
|---|---|---|---|
| Ground Forces | 1,890 | 172 | –90% |
| Air Force | 340 | 180 | –48% |
| Navy | 240 | 123 | –49% |
| Strategic Rocket Forces | 12 | 8 | –33% |
| Space Forces | 7 | 6 | –15% |
| Airborne Troops | 6 | 5 | –17% |

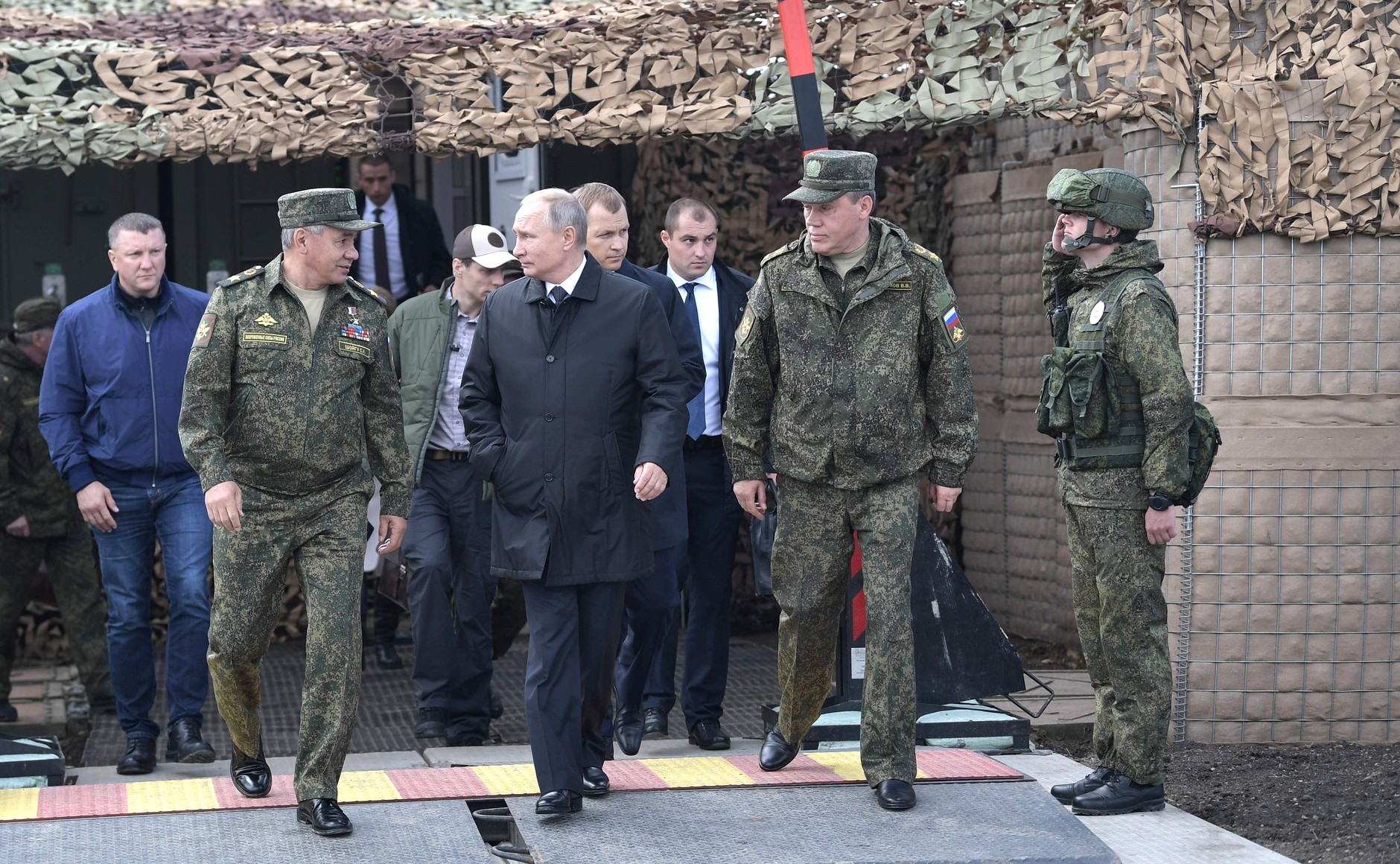
Russian president Vladimir Putin (center) meeting with Russian defense minister Sergey Shoygu (left) and Chief of the General Staff Valery Gerasimov (right) at the Vostok 2018 drills

An essential part of the military reform involves downsizing. At the beginning of the reform the Russian Army had about 1,200,000 active personnel. Largely, the reductions fall among the officers. Personnel are to be reduced according to the table:

| Rank | 1 September 2008 | 1 December 2009 | Planned for 2012 | Reduction |
|---|---|---|---|---|
| General/Admiral | 1,107 | 780 | 877 | −20.8 % |
| Colonel/Captain 1st Rank | 25,665 | | 9,114 | −64.5 % |
| Lieutenant Colonel/Captain 2nd Rank | 19,300 | | 7,500 | −61 % |
| Major/Captain 3rd Rank | 99,550 | | 25,000 | −75 % |
| Captain/Captain Lieutenant | 90,000 | | 40,000 | −56 % |
| First Lieutenant/Senior Lieutenant | 30,000 | | 35,000 | +17% |
| Lieutenant/Lieutenant | 20,000 | | 26,000 | +30% |
| Officers in total | 365,000 | | 220,000 | −40 % |
| Praporshchik/Warrant Officer | 90,000 | 0 | 0 | −100 % |
| Warrant officer | 50,000 | 0 | 0 | −100 % |

The schedule envisaged reducing the total numbers in the officer corps from 335 thousand to 150 thousand, but in early February 2011 Defence Minister Anatoly Serdyukov announced the decision to increase officers by 70,000 - to 220 thousand to counteract this.

According to Alexander Golts, journalist and military columnist, as a result of the 2008 reforms, Russia gained absolute military dominance in the post-Soviet area and the Russian Armed Forces gained the ability that it had never had: ability to quick deployment, which was clearly demonstrated on 26 February 2014, after the Russian president gave the order on 20 February to seize the peninsula on 17 February.

By about 2015 the armed forces had been reduced from 1,004,100 to 850,000 personnel: 250,000 conscripts, 354,000 contract soldiers (kontraktniki), 220,000 officers and 30,000 military school cadets.

After Sergey Shoygu took over the role of Minister of Defence, many of the reforms were reversed. He also aimed to restore trust with senior officers as well as the defense ministry in the wake of the intense resentment Serduykov's reforms had generated. Notably the 2nd Guards Motor Rifle Division and 4th Guards Tank Division were reformed from 2013.

=== Reforms of the reserve officer training system ===
The reserve officer training system, inherited from the Soviet Union, involved selective conscription of graduates of civilian institutions of higher education, who have graduated the military departments of their almae matres and received a commission as an officer. Such person could be conscripted from the reserve of armed forces to active duty, but until the age of 27 only; the period of active duty of such officer was several years, and at the end of that period he was due to be enlisted in the reserve of armed forces again. Such officers were called "blazers" in army's slang (for example, Anatoly Kvashnin was a "blazer").

At the moment of the Dissolution of the Soviet Union, there were 397 civilian institutions of higher education which had military departments, in whole USSR, and 241 Russian institutions retained military departments after that event. Initially, there was a plan of more substantial reduction in the number of military departments, but it had to be abandoned due to dearth of lieutenants associated with regular officers voluntary discharge owing to financial problems of Armed Forces in 1990s, which had to be compensated through reserve officers conscription, which had acquired a particular importance on the background of First Chechen War. Like in the Soviet Union, Russian military education was aimed at training of narrow officers-specialists in particular military occupational specialties, and it differed greatly from American military education system where newly second lieutenants receive particular specialties in the framework of their "career branch" only after graduation of military academy or ROTC. Military departments conducted training mostly at command, engineering, and to a lesser extent at administrative and humanities military occupational specialties. Military education became voluntary.

Federal Law of 28 March 1998, No.53-FZ «About military duty and military service» (in version which was valid as 31 December 2007) provided that only full-time face-to-face learning students of civilian institution of higher education could be accepted to the military department of this civilian institution of higher education (hereinafter in the text also - university). Enrolling in the military department was voluntary for all students. After finishing military department's course, including military training camps or traineeship in military units of regular armed forces, and passing the state final exam student was due to be presented the promotion to primary military officer rank (lieutenant). Graduate of the military department was due to be promoted to officer at the same time as his enlisting in the reserve of armed forces. However, the relevant order of ministry of defence entered into force subject to student’s successful graduation of university in main, civilian degree. Afterwards, such officer could be conscripted from the reserve of armed forces to active duty, but until the age of 27 only. The period of active duty of such officer was 2 years, and at the end of that period he was due to be enlisted in the reserve of armed forces again.

In 2005, minister of defence Sergei Ivanov announced the forthcoming significant reduction in the number of military departments carrying out the training commissioned officers from students of civilian institutions of higher education. By March 2008, 168 of 235 civilian universities, academies and institutions which previously had military departments had lost these units. In addition, 37 of 67 civilian universities, academies and institutions which retained military departments became the basis for establishment of new training military centers. In accordance with Government of Russia Decree of 6 March 2008 No.152, the training military centers focused on training officers for active duty, whilst the military departments focused on training officers for reserve.

In accordance with the amendments, contained in Federal Law of 6 July 2006 No.104-FZ, the conscription of reserve officers was abolished, graduates of military departments were not subject to conscription to active duty no more (with exception of wartime mobilization) but all graduates of training military centers were due to be enrolled for 3 years active duty immediately upon the university graduation.

In accordance with the amendments, contained in Federal Law of 3 August 2018 No.309-FZ, the military departments and the training military centers were abolished, from that moment on, students of civilian institutions of higher education were trained under both officers training programmes (for reserve and for active duty) in the Military Training Centers. In 2019, there were the military training centers in 93 civilian institutions of higher education. The basic characteristic of new system is maximum possible harmonization of military occupational specialty and main civilian specialty of a student.

=== Formation of voluntary military reserve force ===
The Russian military reserve force BARS was established as experiment by the presidential decree of 17 July 2015 No.370.

In 2018, Russia started full-scale formation of military reserve force based on volunteers selected from among those who retired from active duty. Russian military reserve force (Russian: мобилизационный людской резерв) is a set of citizens who have signed a contracts to perform military service as a reservists, who were appointed to a military positions in particular military units in this capacity, and who are involved in all operational, mobilization, and combat activities of these military units, unlike other citizens who haven't signed such contracts and who can be used for mobilization deployment of armed forces on involuntary basis only in cases stipulated by law (Russian: мобилизационный людской ресурс).

The deployment of military units, composed of reservists, takes minimum time and do not requires any retraining of military personnel; furthermore, military units, composed of reservists, use the same weapons as used by military units, composed of active duty military personnel. Military units, staffed by reservists, are 100% manned up to wartime standards just like military units, staffed by active duty military personnel only. There is no possibility to define by military units designation what we're dealing with - reserve or not reserve military unit. The number of reservists is not presented in open sources and is not among the number of active duty military volunteers which is published by Ministry of Defence. This makes it difficult for establish real troop strength of new Russian military units and formations.

=== Possible expansion after Russian invasion of Ukraine ===
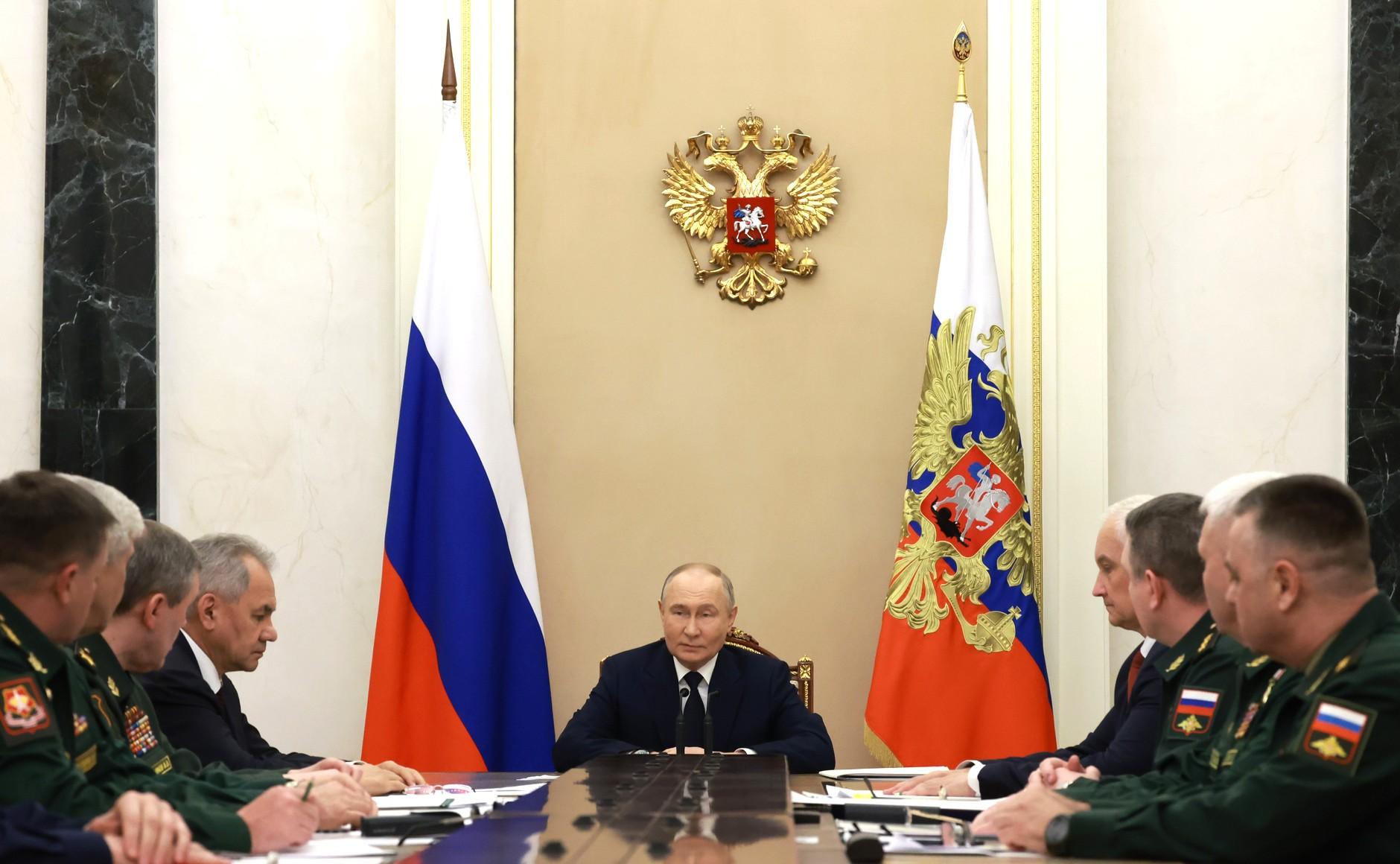
Putin's meeting with Belousov, Shoigu, Gerasimov and commanders of Russia's military districts, 15 May 2024

On December 21, 2022, Defense Minister Sergey Shoigu made a widely publicised report to President Vladimir Putin at a collegium of the Ministry of Defence as the Russian invasion of Ukraine was reaching its tenth month. Shoigu was reported as advocating the creation of "an appropriate grouping of troops" in the northwestern regions of Russia, in response to the anticipated entry of Finland and Sweden into NATO. He said it was planned to establish an army corps in Karelia, and proposed to split the Western Military District so as to recreate the Moscow and Leningrad Military Districts. In addition, 10 new divisions were suggested - five artillery, two air assault and three motor rifle divisions (two motor rifle divisions to be established in the temporarily occupied Zaporozhye and Kherson Oblasts of Ukraine). On the basis of already existing brigades in the Northern Fleet and Western, Central and Eastern Military Districts, according to Shoigu, seven more motor rifle divisions would be established, and five brigades of the Russian Naval Infantry upgraded into divisions. The Russian Aerospace Forces would be expanded by three more Aviation Division headquarters, one fighter and eight bomber aviation regiments, and six army aviation brigades. The Armed Forces as a whole would be expanded to 1.5 million personnel, and the age of conscription raised gradually from 18–27 to 21–30.

Among the new formations established after the invasion of Ukraine were the 6th (in 3rd Army Corps), 27th Guards, 32nd, 67th (25th Combined Arms Army), 69th, 70th (18th Combined Arms Army), and 72nd Motor Rifle Divisions, and the 104th Guards Air Assault Division, plus a new division sponsored by the Airborne Forces, the 44th. It is reported that the 68th, 69th, and 72nd Motor Rifle Divisions will be established in the Leningrad Military District. Brigades formed after the invasion included the 72nd (in 3rd Army Corps), 85th, 88th, 124th, 128th, 144th, 164th, and 169th Motor Rifle; the 11th Separate Tank Brigade; the 49th Separate Airborne Assault Brigade; the 61st Separate Cover Brigade; the 17th Guards Artillery Brigade of High Power, the 52nd Artillery Brigade, and the 73rd Artillery Brigade.

== Invasions and interventions since 2008 ==
=== Georgian war, 2008 ===
The Russo-Georgian War was a war between Georgia, Russia and the Russian-backed self-proclaimed republics of South Ossetia and Abkhazia. The war took place in August 2008 following a period of worsening relations between Russia and Georgia, both formerly constituent republics of the Soviet Union. The fighting took place in the strategically important Transcaucasia region. It is regarded as the first European war of the 21st century.

Russian forces temporarily occupied the Georgian cities of Zugdidi, Senaki, Poti and Gori, holding on to these areas beyond the ceasefire. The South Ossetians destroyed most ethnic Georgian villages in South Ossetia and were responsible for an ethnic cleansing of Georgians. Russia recognised the independence of Abkhazia and South Ossetia from Georgia on 26 August and the Georgian government severed diplomatic relations with Russia. Russia mostly completed its withdrawal of troops from undisputed parts of Georgia on 8 October.

=== Russo-Ukrainian War, 2014–present ===
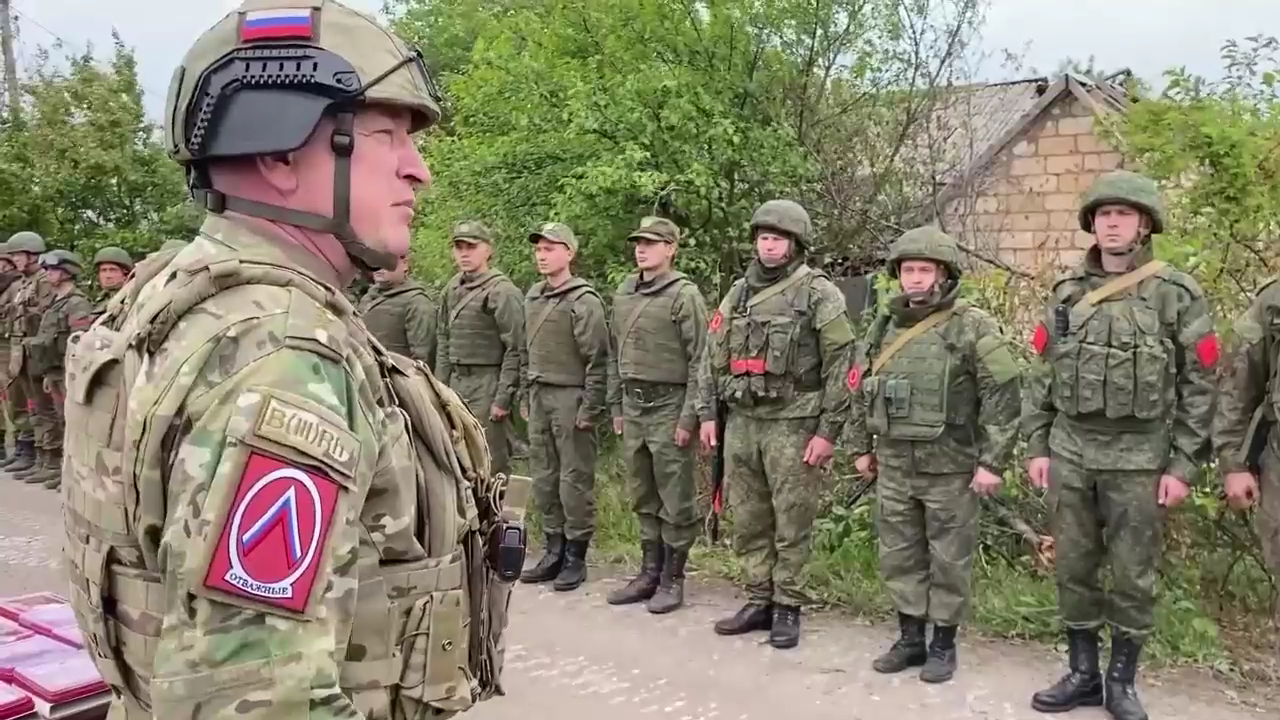
Colonel-General Aleksandr Lapin presents awards to troops who participated in the 2022 battle of Donbas.

The Russo-Ukrainian War is an ongoing and protracted conflict that started in February 2014, primarily involving Russia and pro-Russian forces on one hand, and Ukraine on the other. Following the Euromaidan protests and the subsequent removal of Ukrainian president Viktor Yanukovych on 22 February 2014, and amidst pro-Russian unrest in Ukraine, Russian soldiers without insignias took control of strategic positions and infrastructure within the Ukrainian territory of Crimea. On 1 March 2014, the Federation Council of the Russian Federation unanimously adopted a resolution to petition Russian President Vladimir Putin to use military force in Ukraine. The resolution was adopted several days later, after the start of the Russian military operation on the "Returning of Crimea". Russia then annexed Crimea after a widely criticised local referendum which was organised by Russia after the capturing of the Crimean Parliament whose outcome was for the Autonomous Republic of Crimea to join the Russian Federation.

In April, demonstrations by pro-Russian groups in the Donbas area of Ukraine escalated into a war between the Ukrainian government and the Russian-backed separatist forces of the self-declared Donetsk and Luhansk People's Republics. In August, Russian military vehicles crossed the Russia–Ukraine border in several locations of Donetsk Oblast. The incursion by the Russian military was seen as responsible for the defeat of Ukrainian forces in early September.

After the war began, Russian forces began to use torture against captured Ukrainians (both military and civilians, which is a war crime). One of the first recorded cases of torture of prisoners of war in Ukraine was an incident on October 7, 2014, in the city of Zuhres (Donetsk region), when 53-year-old Ukrainian Ihor Kozhoma, who was trying to take his wife out of the occupied territory, was tied to a column and tortured for several hours by Russians and local separatists. A similar case was with Donetsk resident Iryna Dovhan (civilian) who was publicly tortured for her pro-Ukrainian position.

On 24 February 2022, Russia launched a full-scale invasion of Ukraine. The campaign started after a prolonged military buildup and the Russian recognition of the self-proclaimed Donetsk People's Republic and Luhansk People's Republic in the days prior to the invasion, followed by the entrance of the Russian Armed Forces to the Donbas region of Eastern Ukraine on 21 February 2022. At about 06:00 Moscow time (UTC+3), Russian president Vladimir Putin announced a military operation in eastern Ukraine; minutes later, missile strikes began at locations across the country, including in the capital Kyiv. Nearly all of the 190,000 troops built up on Ukraine's borders were quickly moved into Ukraine, and land, sea, and air bombardments begun, targeting major population centers and strategic military sites. After making some initial territorial and strategic gains, the Russian invasion was quickly ground to a halt due to strong Ukrainian Armed Forces resistance, large international military donations to Ukraine, and poor logistics and morale. In March 2022, the Russian military retreated from the northern Kyiv Region, instead focusing on occupying eastern Ukraine. On 21 September 2022, during the ongoing invasion of Ukraine, the president of Russia Vladimir Putin announced the first mobilization of citizens being in mobilization human resource, conducted on a compulsory basis, in the Russian Federation's history, and signed the corresponding decree No. 647. This decision was made shortly after the successful Ukrainian counteroffensive in Kharkiv Oblast which resulted in de-occupation of the territory of the Kharkiv Oblast to the west of the Oskil River.

The Wagner Group mercenaries, previously close to Putin, launched an armed rebellion against the Russian Military in June 2023. Earlier that month, Putin had supported a measure that would have forced the Wagner Group and other mercenaries to sign government contracts, thereby placing the group more firmly under the military command structure.

Russian independent news outlet Meduza estimated that 120,000 Russian soldiers had been killed during the Russian invasion of Ukraine by 30 June 2024. Several days later, The Economist made its own calculation using the severely-wounded-to-killed ratio from leaked documents by the United States Department of Defense, giving an estimate of between 462,000 and 728,000 Russian soldiers killed or wounded since the start of the invasion. According to NATO and Western military officials, around 1,200 Russian soldiers were killed or wounded in Ukraine every day on average in May and June 2024, mainly due to the use of Soviet tactics of human wave attacks.

=== Syria, 2015–2024 ===
The Russian military intervention in the Syrian civil war began in September 2015, after an official request by the Syrian government for military aid against rebel groups. The intervention initially involved air strikes by Russian aircraft deployed to the Khmeimim base against targets primarily in north-western Syria, and against Syrian opposition militant groups opposed to the Syrian government, including the Syrian National Coalition, the Islamic State of Iraq and the Levant (ISIL), al-Nusra Front (al-Qaeda in Syria) and the Army of Conquest. In addition, Russian special operations forces and military advisors are deployed to Syria. Prior to the intervention, Russian involvement in the Syrian Civil War had mainly consisted of supplying the Syrian Army with arms and equipment. At the end of December 2017, the Russian government announced its troops would be deployed to Syria permanently.

In December 2024 the Russian-backed Assad government fell and Bashar al-Assad was given refuge in Moscow.

== See also ==
- List of wars involving Russia
- Military history of Russia
- Military history of the Soviet Union

== Sources ==
- Korotkevich, Vitaliy (2004). История современной России 1991-2003 [History of modern Russia 1991-2003] (in Russian). Saint Petersburg: Saint Petersburg State University. ISBN 5-288-03376-5.
- Lynch, Dov (1999). Russian Peacekeeping Strategies in the CIS: The Case of Moldova, Georgia and Tajikistan. Springer. ISBN 9780333984215.
- Institute for the Study of War, https://www.understandingwar.org/backgrounder/russia%E2%80%99s-military-restructuring-and-expansion-hindered-ukraine-war
- Odom, William E. (1998). The Collapse of the Soviet Military. Yale University Press. ISBN 0-300-07469-7.
- Parchomenko, Walter (1999). "The State of Russia's Armed Forces and Military Reform". The US Army War College Quarterly: Parameters. 29 (4). ssi.armywarcollege.edu: 98–110. doi:10.55540/0031-1723.1949. ISSN 0031-1723. Archived from the original on 13 August 2020.
- Hlib Parfonov, Moscow Re-Organizes Russian Armed Forces (Part One), Eurasia Daily Monitor Volume: 20 Issue: 164, October 24, 2023
- Pitalev, Ilya (18 December 2008). "Суть военных реформ в России - план Сердюкова". RIA Novosti (in Russian).
- Robinson, Colin D. (2005). "The Russian Ground Forces Today: A Structural Status Examination". Journal of Slavic Military Studies. 18 (2): 189–206. doi:10.1080/13518040590944421. S2CID 145691472.
- Schofield, Carey (1993). The Russian Elite: Inside Spetsnaz and the Airborne Forces. Greenhill Books.
