= United Armed Forces of the Commonwealth of Independent States =

Short-lived military of the Commonwealth of Independent States

- Объединённые Вооружённые силы Содружества Независимых Государств
- Founded: 14 February 1992; 34 years ago
- Disbanded: 24 December 1993; 32 years ago

Leadership
- Commander-in-Chief: Yevgeny Shaposhnikov
- Chief of Staff: Viktor Samsonov

The United Armed Forces of the Commonwealth of Independent States (Russian: Объединённые Вооружённые силы Содружества Независимых Государств) was a short-lived military entity associated with the Commonwealth of Independent States. It was created in 1992 after the demise of the Soviet Union, and was intended to be the continuation of the Soviet Armed Forces and to hold control over the Soviet Union's nuclear weapons.

It was rapidly superseded by the de facto Russian control of those nuclear weapons, and the formation of separate national armies for each of the former Soviet states, and had effectively ceased to exist by the end of 1993.

== Formation ==
The Soviet Union officially dissolved on 25 December 1991. After signing the Belavezha Accords on 21 December 1991, the countries of the newly formed CIS signed a protocol on the temporary appointment of Marshal of Aviation Yevgeny Shaposhnikov as Minister of Defence and commander of the armed forces in their territory, including strategic nuclear forces. On 14 February 1992 Shaposhnikov formally became Supreme Commander of the CIS Armed Forces by decision of the Council of CIS Heads of State when the bulk of documents regulating issues of military cooperation were signed in Minsk.

The creation of CIS Joint Forces was made by leaders of Azerbaijan, Armenia, Belarus, Kazakhstan, Kyrgyzstan, Russia, Tajikistan, Turkmenistan, and Uzbekistan. However Moldova and Ukraine did not sign the documents on the creation of generalized CIS Joint Forces and did not agree with the principle despite membership in the CIS. Latvia, Lithuania, and Estonia, due to their international status as Soviet occupied states had restored their independence, and were not legally held as post-Soviet countries, and thus outside any post-Soviet or CIS organisation. And Georgia did not sign these documents upon their creation because it did not become a member of the CIS until 1993.

== Disintegration ==
On 16 March 1992 a decree by Boris Yeltsin created the Armed Forces of the Russian Federation under the operational control of Allied High Command and the Ministry of Defence, which was headed by the President. Finally, on 7 May 1992, Yeltsin signed a decree establishing the Russian armed forces and Yeltsin assumed the duties of the Supreme Commander. In May 1992, General Colonel Pavel Grachev became the Russian Minister of Defence, and was made Russia's first Army General on assuming the post.

After this announcement, Marshal of Aviation Yevgeny Shaposhnikov, Commander-in-Chief of CIS Armed Forces, Head of the Main Command (Glavkomat) "and a skeletal staff to support his role as commander of the CIS Armed Forces were evicted from the MoD and General Staff buildings and given offices in the former Warsaw Pact headquarters on the northern outskirts of Moscow" (on Prospekt Mira/Mira Avenue). Shaposhnikov's staff quickly became a very weak body as the new states' authorities asserted their control over their own armed forces. On 15 June 1993 Shaposhnikov's staff was abolished, and Shaposhnikov resigned. By the end of 1993 the abolition of the Joint Military Command (Glavkomat) had become effective.

The CIS Joint Military Command was replaced with a scaled-down Joint Staff for Coordinating Military Cooperation. An agreement was formally signed at Ashgabat on 24 December 1993 to establish the Staff for the Coordination of Military Cooperation Member States of the Commonwealth of Independent States (Russian: Штабе по координации военного сотрудничества государств – участников Содружества Независимых Государств). Colonel General Viktor Samsonov took up the role until October 1996. Army General Vladimir Yakovlev appears to have become Chief of the Staff in June 2001.

The CSTO, which was negotiated and agreed to on May 15, 1992 and entered into force on April 20, 1994 replaced the role of the CIS United Armed Forces of military coordination and mutual defense between self-selected states of the former USSR, even if there wasn't a legal succession between the two organizations.

== See also ==
- Collective Security Treaty Organization
- Collective Rapid Reaction Force
- Joint CIS Air Defense System
