= Viktor Dubynin =

Former chief of the general staff of the armed forces of the Russian Federation

Viktor Petrovich Dubynin
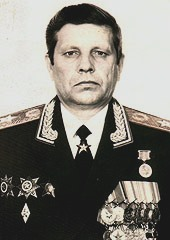
- Born: 1 February 1943; Martyush, Sverdlovsk Oblast, Russian SFSR, Soviet Union
- Died: 22 November 1992 (aged 49); Moscow, Russia
- Military career
- Allegiance: Soviet Union (to 1991); Russia
- Branch: Soviet Army; Russian Ground Forces
- Service years: 1961–1992
- Rank: General of the Army
- Commands: 40th Army; Northern Group of Forces; Chief of the General Staff
- Conflicts: Soviet–Afghan War
- Awards: Hero of the Russian Federation; Order of the Red Banner; Order for Service to the Homeland, 2nd Class

General of the Army Viktor Petrovich Dubynin (Note: Russian: Виктор Петрович Дубынин) (1 February 1943 – 22 November 1992) was a prominent Soviet and Russian military officer and a recipient of the title Hero of the Russian Federation (posthumously).

== Biography ==
Born in 1943, Viktor Dubynin had been in service with the Soviet Army since 1961. In 1964 he graduated from the Far Eastern Tank Academy, then from the Rodion Malinovsky Armored Forces Academy in 1978, and finally from the General Staff Academy in 1984.

From 1986 to 1987 he served as commander of the Soviet 40th Army in Afghanistan.

From 1989 to 1992 he was the (penultimate) commander of the Soviet Northern Group of Forces in Poland.

On 10 June 1992, Dubynin was appointed by President Boris Yeltsin as Chief of the General Staff of the Armed Forces of the Russian Federation. On the 5 October, he became Russia's first general of the army since the Collapse of the Soviet Union. At that moment Dubynin was already suffering from terminal cancer, so the then-Minister of Defense Pavel Grachev had to visit him at his hospital ward in order to hand Dubynin's shoulder boards over to him.

Dubynin died on 22 November 1992 after his long struggle with cancer. His grave is at Novodevichy cemetery in Moscow.

== See also ==
- List of Heroes of the Russian Federation

== Notes ==
Military offices
Preceded by Valery Mironov	Deputy Commander of the 40th Army; 1984–1986	Succeeded by ???
Preceded by Igor Rodionov	Commander of the 40th Army; 1986–1987	Succeeded by Boris Gromov
Preceded by Vladimir Shevtsov	Commander of the 7th Tank Army; 1987–1988	Succeeded by Mikhail Kendyukhov
Preceded by Mikhail Kalinin	Chief of Staff of the Kiev Military District; 1988–1989	Succeeded by Valentyn Boryskin
Preceded by Ivan Korbutov	Commander of the Northern Group of Forces; 1989–1992	Succeeded by Leonid Kovalyov
Position created Viktor Samsonov as Chief of the Soviet General Staff	Chief of the General Staff of the Russian Armed Forces; 1992	Succeeded by Mikhail Kolesnikov
