= Vladimir Isakov (general) =

Russian general (born 1950)

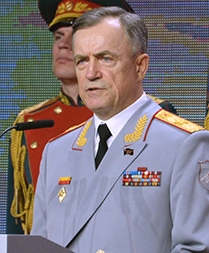
- Born: 21 July 1950 (age 76); Rovno, Ukrainian SSR, Soviet Union
- Alma mater: Moscow Military School of Civil Defense; Military Academy of Logistics and Transport; Voroshilov General Staff Academy
- Military career
- Allegiance: Soviet Union (to 1991); Russia
- Branch: Soviet Army; Russian Ground Forces
- Service years: 1969–2009
- Rank: General of the Army
- Commands: 35th Combined Arms Army
- Awards: Order of Military Merit (Russia)

General of the Army Vladimir Ilyich Isakov (Note: Russian: Владимир Ильич Исаков) (born 21 July 1950) is a Russian retired military officer who served as commander of the Rear of the Russian Armed Forces and Deputy Minister of Defense.

== Biography ==
Born in the village of Voskresensk, Kirovsky district, Kaluga Oblast. His father was Ilya Nikolaevich Isakov, a participant in the Great Patriotic War.

He was conscripted to the Soviet Armed Forces in 1967. He graduated from the Moscow Military School of Civil Defense (1970), the Military Academy of Logistics and Transport (1977) (both absorbed into the Military Logistics Academy), and the Military Academy of the General Staff of the Armed Forces of Russia (1988).

He served in the USSR Civil Defense Forces, commanded a reconnaissance platoon of a separate mechanized battalion, and in 1971-1975 was a company commander in the Leningrad Military District. After graduating from the academy, he continued to serve in the Logistics Units of the Soviet Armed Forces: from 1977 he served as Deputy Commander of the 153rd Tank Regiment for Logistics in the Group of Soviet Forces in Germany, from 1980 he served as Deputy Chief of Logistics Staff and head of the Logistics Control Center of the 20th Guards Combined Arms Army. Since 1982 he was deputy division commander for logistics and chief of logistics of a motorized rifle division in the Siberian Military District (Omsk).

From 1992 he served as Deputy Commander-in-Chief of the Western Group of Forces for Logistics - Chief of Logistics of the Western Group of Forces. Since December 1994 he served as head of the department of logistics and technical support at the Military Academy of the General Staff of the Armed Forces of Russia. In November 1996, he was appointed chief of staff and first deputy chief of logistics of the Armed Forces of the Russian Federation.

Since June 1997 he served as Chief of Logistics of the Armed Forces of the Russian Federation and Deputy Minister of Defense of the Russian Federation. By decree of the President of the Russian Federation issued on February 22, 2002, he was awarded the military rank of army general. He is author of a number of scientific works and textbooks on the organization and work of the logistics agencies of the Armed Forces.

In December 2008, he was relieved of his position and transferred to the reserve from military service, although more than two years remained before the expiration of Isakov's military service limit. A number of publications suggested that the sudden resignation was due to Isakov's disagreement with the major reform of the armed forces and, in particular, the rear services, launched by the Minister of Defense of the Russian Federation Anatoly Serdyukov.

He is the chairman of the public fund named after Hero of Russia, Army General Viktor Dubynin. Chief Inspector of the Office of Inspectors General of the Ministry of Defense of the Russian Federation. He is recipient of the Order of Military Merit, Order "For Merit to the Fatherland", Order of the Red Banner and Order of Alexander Nevsky.

He lives in Moscow. He is married and has two children.
