= Valentin Bobryshev =

Russian army officer

- Валентин Сергеевич Бобрышев
- Born: Valentin Sergeyevich Bobryshev; 5 March 1945; Arkhiposkoye, Budyonnovsky District, Russian SFSR, Soviet Union
- Died: 30 November 2022 (aged 77); Saint Petersburg, Russia
- Military career
- Allegiance: Soviet Union; Russia
- Branch: Soviet Army; Russian Ground Forces
- Service years: 1963–2010
- Rank: Army general
- Commands: Leningrad Military District (1997–2005)
- Conflicts: Tajikistani Civil War

Valentin Sergeyevich Bobryshev (Russian: Валентин Сергеевич Бобрышев; 5 March 1945 – 30 November 2022) was a Soviet and later Russian Army officer. He commanded the Leningrad Military District from 1997 to 2005, having reached the rank of General of the Army in 2003.

== Biography ==
Valentin Bobryshev was born on 5 March 1945 to a military family. He graduated from the Kyiv Suvorov Military School in 1963, and joined the Soviet Army the same year. He graduated from the Leningrad Higher Combined Arms Command School named after S. M. Kirov in 1966. In September that year he served in the 131st Pechenga Motorized Rifle Division of the 6th Army of the Leningrad Military District in Murmansk, and in November 1966, he became the commander of a reconnaissance platoon.

In September 1969, Bobryshev was the commander of a motorized rifle company. In October 1971, he was the deputy battalion commander. In November 1972, he was promoted as a battalion commander. In August 1974, he studied at the Frunze Military Academy. After graduating from the academy, in June 1977, he became the commander of a motorized rifle regiment in the 123rd Guards Motorized Rifle Division in the Far Eastern Military District. From September 1979, he became the chief of staff of the 123rd Guards Motorized Rifle Division, a position he held until August 1981. In July 1983, after graduating from the Military Academy of the General Staff of the Armed Forces named after K. E. Voroshilov, he became the commander of the 19th Guards Tank Nikolaev–Budapest Division of the Southern Group of Forces in Hungary.

In September 1985, Bobryshev was the 1st Deputy Commander of the 14th Guards Army of the Odessa Military District. In June 1987, he was the chief of staff of the 1st Guards Army of the Kiev Military District. In May 1988, he was promoted to commander of the 1st Guards Army. In August 1991, Bobryshev was the Chief of Staff of the Baltic Military District. In November 1991, he was the Chief of Staff of the North-Western Group of Forces in Lithuania, Latvia and Estonia.

In September 1994, Bobryshev was the commander of the Commonwealth of Independent States collective peacekeeping forces during the Tajikistani Civil War. In May 1995, Bobryshev was part of the CIS summit in Tajikistan amidst of the Tajik Civil War. In June 1995, Russian president Boris Yeltsin appointed Bobryshev as commander of the Collective Peacekeeping Forces of the Commonwealth of Independent States in Tajikistan.

In December 1995, Bobryshev became the Chief of Staff – First Deputy Commander of the Leningrad Military District. On 18 December 1996, after the district commander, Colonel General Sergey Seleznyov, died in a plane crash, Bobryshev was appointed acting commander of the Leningrad Military District. On 4 March 1997, he was confirmed as commander of the district. He was promoted colonel general in May 1997. On 1 December 2000, he was awarded with honors and the certificate by the CIS Military for courage during the Tajik civil war.

On 5 March 2002, despite the Chechen incidents and setbacks, Bobryshev was part of formation of the 76th Guards Air Assault Division at Pskov, with Defence Minister Sergei Ivanov as part of the military reforms. Bobryshev was promoted to General of the Army by decree of the president of Russia on 21 February 2003. On 5 March 2005, Bobyrshev was awarded the Order of Honor.

On 10 March 2005, Bobryshev, by now aged 60, was succeeded in his post by Igor Puzanov. According to the law “On Military Duty and Military Service,” active military service at the rank of army general was limited to the age of 60. This could be extended to 65 with the joint agreement of the officer and the president. However, at a press conference at the end of February, Bobryshev admitted to reporters that he had earlier in the month “submitted his resignation due to reaching retirement age.” He was in the reserve from 2005 and retired from the army in 2010.

Bobryshev died on 30 November 2022 at the age of 77. He was buried at the Nikolskoe Cemetery of the Alexander Nevsky Lavra in Saint Petersburg.

== Personal life ==
Bobryshev lived in Saint Petersburg, and had worked as deputy head of the October Railway of Russian Railways in 2009.

Bobryshev was married and had a son and daughter.
