= Anatoly Grebenyuk =

Russian military general (born 1955)

- Native name: Анатолий Гребенюк
- Born: 18 October 1955 (age 70); Mizoch, Ukrainian SSR
- Allegiance: Soviet Union; Russia
- Branch: Soviet Army; Russian Armed Forces
- Service years: 1981-2007
- Rank: Army general
- Conflicts: Second Chechen War
- Education: General Staff Military Academy

Anatoly Vladimirovich Grebenyuk (Russian: Анатолий Владимирович Гребенюк; born October 18, 1955, in Mizoch, Ukrainian SSR) is a Russian military leader, who holds the rank of General of the Army.

== Biography ==
After graduating from high school, he entered the Ukrainian Institute of Water Management Engineers in Rivne, graduating in 1977. In 1977–1981, he worked as a foreman at the Rivne Nuclear Power Plant.

In 1981, he was called up from the reserve to serve in the Soviet Army with the rank of lieutenant. Since 1981, he served in the construction units of the Central Asian Military District on the construction of Strategic Missile Forces facilities in the Balkhash District of the Kazakh SSR. He held the positions of work producer, head of the construction and installation site, chief engineer and deputy head of the engineering work department. Three military ranks were awarded ahead of schedule.

Since 1986, he served in the Transcaucasian Military District as the head of the engineering work department of the Main Directorate of Special Construction of the USSR Ministry of Defense. He supervised the construction of the missile defense early warning station in Gabala (Gabala Radar Station).

Active participant in the liquidation of the consequences of the 1988 earthquake in the Armenian SSR in 1988 and restoration and construction work in the earthquake zone.

Since 1991 he served as Deputy Commander of the Volga–Ural Military District for construction and billeting. Since July 1992 - Deputy Commander of the Volga–Ural Military District for construction and billeting. Since 1994 he served as chief of the Main Directorate of Special Construction (GUSS) of the Ministry of Defense of the Russian Federation. He was promoted to Lieutenant General on 5 May 1995.

He graduated from the Higher Academic Courses at the Military Academy of the General Staff in 1998.

Since August 2000 he served as Deputy Chief of Construction and Billeting of the Troops of the Ministry of Defense of the Russian Federation. He supervised the construction of military facilities on the territory of the Chechen Republic, in 2001 alone he spent over 8 months on business trips in the Chechen Republic. From March 2003 he served as Chief of Construction and Billeting of Troops and Deputy Minister of Defense of the Russian Federation. From April 2004 he served as chief of the Quartering and Accommodation Service of the Ministry of Defense. The military rank of General of the Army was awarded by the decree of the President of Russia, Vladimir Putin dated June 12, 2006.

A participant in Second Chechen War, he led the creation of a group of military builders in the Chechen Republic in 2000, consisting of three military construction directorates and six military construction battalions. They quickly built all the necessary material base for the deployment of the 42nd Guards Motor Rifle Division and the Itum-Kalinsky Border Detachment. In 2001, he spent 260 days in Chechnya.

In November 2007, he was relieved of his post and discharged into the reserve at the age of 52 (the only such case in the military history of the Russian Federation).

From January 2009 to 20210 he served as Senior Vice President of the State Corporation Olympstroy. From 2011 to October 2014 he served as First Deputy General Director of SU-155 corporation for the regions. Since October 2014 he is the First Deputy Head of the Working Group for Coordination of Construction of Facilities of the Vostochny Cosmodrome and Assistant to the Minister of Construction of the Russian Federation. Since 2015 he is director of Patriot Park of the Russian Ministry of Defense. Since 2016 he is the General Director of OOO Pervy Dom. He is also the Chief Inspector in the Office of Inspectors General of the Ministry of Defense of Russia.

== Awards ==
- Order of Military Merit
- Jubilee Medal "300 Years of the Russian Navy"
- Medal "In Commemoration of the 850th Anniversary of Moscow"
- Medal "In Commemoration of the 300th Anniversary of Saint Petersburg"
- Jubilee Medal "70 Years of the Armed Forces of the USSR"
