= Viktor Samsonov =

Russian general (1941–2024)

- Виктор Самсонов
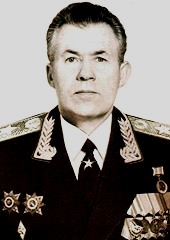
- Born: 10 November 1941; Dukhovnitskoye, Saratov Oblast, Russian SFSR, Soviet Union
- Died: 17 November 2024 (aged 83); Moscow, Russia
- Burial place: Federal Military Memorial Cemetery
- Alma mater: Far Eastern Higher Command School; Frunze Military Academy; Voroshilov General Staff Academy
- Military career
- Allegiance: Soviet Union (to 1991); Russia
- Branch: Soviet Navy; Soviet Army; Russian Ground Forces
- Service years: 1964–2002
- Rank: General of the Army
- Commands: Chief of the General Staff; Leningrad Military District; 4th Army
- Conflicts: Nagorno-Karabakh conflict First Chechen War

General of the Army Viktor Nikolayevich Samsonov (Note: Russian: Виктор Николаевич Самсонов) (10 November 1941 – 17 November 2024) was a Russian military officer. He became a Soviet Army officer after graduating the Far Eastern Higher Combined Arms Command School in 1964. He was the last Chief of the General Staff of the Soviet Armed Forces from 1991 to 1992 and was in command of all military forces on the territory of the Russian SFSR after the dissolution of the Soviet Union. He was then the Chief of the General Staff of the Commonwealth of Independent States (CIS) Armed Forces from 1992 to 1993, Chief of Staff for Coordinating Military Cooperation of the CIS Member States from 1993 to 1996, and the Chief of the General Staff of the Armed Forces of the Russian Federation from 1996 to 1997.

== Early military career ==
Samsonov was born on 10 November 1941 in the work settlement of Dukhovnitskoye, Saratov Oblast, Russian SFSR. After he graduated from school he first worked at a train station in Sosnogorsk. He entered the Soviet Army in 1960 as an officer cadet, and was commissioned as a lieutenant at the Far Eastern Higher Command School in July 1964. In October of that year he was assigned to the Soviet Naval Infantry, where he served as a platoon and company commander, in the 55th Naval Infantry Division of the Pacific Fleet. Samsonov attended the Frunze Military Academy in the early 1970s, where he was classmates with Mikhail Moiseyev and Boris Gromov, and graduated in 1972. Afterwards he held command roles in the motor rifle forces of the Soviet Army at the regimental and division level. In 1974 he received a promotion to lieutenant colonel ahead of schedule, and was promoted to colonel in 1979. After graduating from the General Staff Academy of the Soviet Armed Forces in 1981 Samsonov became a motor rifle division commander.

In September 1983 he was made the chief of staff of a field army, and in May 1985 he was appointed as commander of the 4th Army, in the Transcaucasian Military District. In May 1987, as a lieutenant general, Samsonov was made chief of staff and first deputy commander of the Transcaucasian Military District. In July 1990 he became the commander of the Leningrad Military District, and during the August 1991 coup attempt in the Soviet Union he was named the military commandant of Leningrad by the State Committee on the State of Emergency. He supported the local government and did not have significant role in the events of the coup, with his main action being the increase in security at military sites in the area.

== Senior military career ==
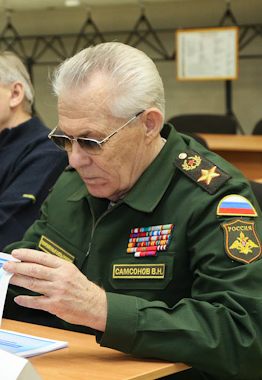
Samsonov in 2014

In December 1991, shortly before the dissolution of the Soviet Union, Colonel General Samsonov was made the Chief of the General Staff of the Soviet Armed Forces. In early 1992, the former Soviet military on the territory of the Russian SFSR was under his command. In January, his post was renamed to being that of the Commonwealth of Independent States (CIS) Armed Forces, and in February he was formally appointed to the new position. He had strained relations with the CIS Armed Forces commander-in-chief, Marshal Yevgeny Shaposhnikov, and Russian Minister of Defense, Col. Gen. Pavel Grachev. In 1993 the attempt to create a unified CIS military fell apart, and in December of that year Samsonov became the Chief of Staff for Coordinating Military Cooperation of the CIS Member States.

He was promoted to rank of general of the army by President Boris Yeltsin, who appointed Samsonov as Chief of the General Staff of the Russian Armed Forces in October 1996. He was critical of the direction taken by the military at that time, and was said to be opposed to military reforms desired by Yeltsin, for which he was dismissed in May 1997, along with the Minister of Defense, Igor Rodionov. From then until 1999 Samsonov was at the service of the Ministry of Defense, and from June 2000 he worked for the Russian presidential administration while still being on active duty. He retired in March 2002.

Samsonov was married and had two sons. After his retirement, he became the president of the Fund for Assistance to Disabled People and Veterans of War and Labour. He died on 17 November 2024, at the age of 83. He was buried with military honours at the Federal Military Memorial Cemetery on 20 November 2024.

== Awards and decorations ==
- Order of Friendship
- Order of the Red Banner
- Order "For Service to the Homeland in the Armed Forces of the USSR"
- Medal "For Battle Merit"
- Jubilee Medal "In Commemoration of the 100th Anniversary of the Birth of Vladimir Ilyich Lenin"
- Medal "For Distinction in Guarding the State Border of the USSR"
- Jubilee Medal "Twenty Years of Victory in the Great Patriotic War 1941–1945"
- Medal "In Commemoration of the 850th Anniversary of Moscow"
- Medal "Veteran of the Armed Forces of the USSR"
- Medal "For Strengthening of Brotherhood in Arms"
- Jubilee Medal "50 Years of the Armed Forces of the USSR"
- Jubilee Medal "60 Years of the Armed Forces of the USSR"
- Jubilee Medal "70 Years of the Armed Forces of the USSR"
- Medal "In Commemoration of the 1500th Anniversary of Kiev"
- Medal "For Impeccable Service"

== Notes ==
Military offices
Preceded by Aleksandr Kovtunov	Commander of the 4th Army; 1985–1987	Succeeded by Anatoly Shapovalov
Preceded by Anatoly Kleymyonov	Chief of Staff of the Transcaucasian Military District; 1987–1990	Succeeded by Nikolai Zvinchukov
Preceded by Viktor Yermakov	Commander of the Leningrad Military District; 1990–1991	Succeeded by Sergey Seleznyov
Preceded by Vladimir Lobov	Chief of the General Staff of the Soviet Armed Forces; 1991–1992	Position abolished
Position established	Chief of the General Staff of the Commonwealth of Independent States Armed Forces; 1992–1993	Position abolished
Position established	Chief of Staff for Coordinating Military Cooperation of the CIS Member States; 1993–1996	Succeeded by Viktor Prudnikov
Preceded by Mikhail Kolesnikov	Chief of the General Staff of the Russian Armed Forces; 1996–1997	Succeeded by Anatoly Kvashnin
