= Yuri Yakovlev (military officer) =

- Native name: Юрий Яковлев
- Born: 29 April 1952 (age 74); Belozersky District, Vologda Oblast, Soviet Union
- Allegiance: Soviet Union; Russia
- Branch: FSB
- Service years: 1975-2016
- Rank: Army general
- Alma mater: Moscow Engineering Physics Institute

Yuri Vladimirovich Yakovlev (Russian: Юрий Владимирович Яковлев; born April 29, 1952) is a Russian intelligence officer, head of the Economic Security Service of the Federal Security Service of the Russian Federation (2008–2016), deputy general director of the Rosatom State Corporation (since October 10, 2016), and holds the rank of General of the Army.

== Biography ==
In 1975, he graduated from the Moscow Engineering Physics Institute, specializing in Experimental Nuclear Physics. After graduating, from 1975 to 1976, he worked as an engineer at the Lebedev Physical Institute of the Academy of Sciences of the Soviet Union.

From 1976 to 2016, he worked in operational and management positions in state security agencies. From 2004 to 2008, he served as the first deputy head of the Economic Security Service of the Federal Security Service, and from 2008 to 2016, as the head of this structure. In his position, he also headed the FSB Coordination Council for the Protection of National Interests of the Russian Federation in the Arctic. In June 2016, he was dismissed by decree of the President of Russia.

From 10 October 2016 he served as Deputy Director General of the Rosatom State Corporation for State Policy in the Field of Security in the Use of Nuclear Energy for Defense Purposes.

On 12 February 2023, amid the Russian invasion of Ukraine, he was included in the sanctions list of Ukraine because "Rosatom's management sent its employees to Ukraine along with Russian military personnel who seized the Ukrainian nuclear power plants - Zaporizhzhia Nuclear Power Plant and Chernobyl Nuclear Power Plant". On 24 February 2023, he was included in the sanctions list of the United Kingdom "because he was and is involved in receiving benefits from or supporting the government". On 19 May 2023, he was included in the sanctions list of Canada for "close associates of the regime".

== Awards ==
- Order "For Merit to the Fatherland", 3rd and 4th class,
- Order of Military Merit
- Order of Honour
