= Oleg Syromolotov =

- Олег Сыромолотов
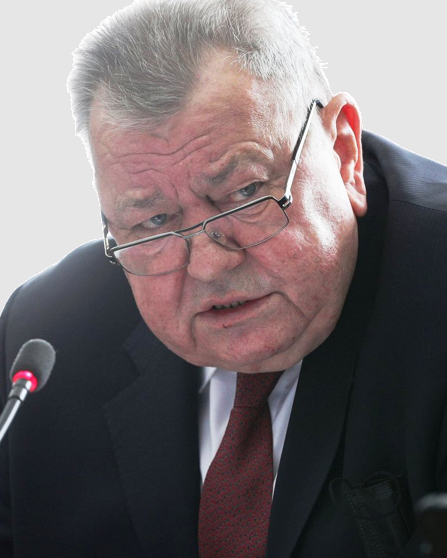
- Syromolotov in 2022

Deputy Director of the Federal Security Service
- In office 12 July 2000 – July 2004
- President: Vladimir Putin

Personal details
- Born: Oleg Vladimirovich Syromolotov; 19 May 1953 (age 72)

Military service
- Allegiance: Russia
- Branch: Federal Security Service (FSB)
- Years: 1979–2015
- Rank: General of the Army

Oleg Vladimirovich Syromolotov (Russian: Оле́г Влади́мирович Сыромо́лотов; born 19 May 1953) was Deputy Director of Russia's Federal Security Service (FSB), the successor of the Soviet-era KGB. He has headed the DKR, the organisation's counterintelligence branch. He was chief of security for the 2014 Winter Olympics in Sochi.

Syromolotov became major-general in the Russian Army on 18 December 1993. He rose through the ranks of the FSB, eventually becoming Director of Counterintelligence Support for the Transport Department of Economic Security. From 12 July 2000 until July 2004 he was Deputy Director of the Russian FSB − Federal Security Service chief of counterintelligence department.

Syromolotov gave a rare interview on the 80th anniversary of the formation of Russia's first counterintelligence department in May 2002. He said that over the past two years, DKR personnel had caught 14 foreign agents and put some 260 foreign secret services employees under surveillance.

Syromolotov was colonel-general of the Army until early 2007, when he was promoted to general alongside future FSB Director Alexander Bortnikov.

On 28 April 2009 President Dmitry Medvedev issued Presidential Decree 468, which appointed Syromolotov as a member of the Presidential Council of the Russian Federation on the Development of Physical Fitness and Sports. In May 2010, he was also appointed by President Putin to head security for the XXII Olympic Winter Games and XI Paralympic Winter Games of 2014 in Sochi, and the XXVII World Summer Universiade 2013 in Kazan. His appointment came as a surprise to observers who expected that a counterterrorism specialist would be selected.

== Honors ==
- 2002 − Medal of Honor (Belarus)
- 2014 − Paralympic Order
