= Mikhail Kolesnikov (politician) =

Russian general (1939–2007)

- Михаил Колесников
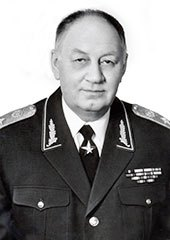

Minister of Defense Acting
- In office 18 June 1996 – 24 July 1996
- Preceded by: Pavel Grachev
- Succeeded by: Igor Rodionov

Personal details
- Born: 30 June 1939 Yeysk, Krasnodar Krai, Russian SFSR, Soviet Union
- Died: 26 March 2007 (aged 67) Moscow, Russia
- Resting place: Troyekurovskoye Cemetery
- Education: Omsk Armored Engineering Institute; Malinovsky Military Armored Forces Academy; Voroshilov General Staff Academy
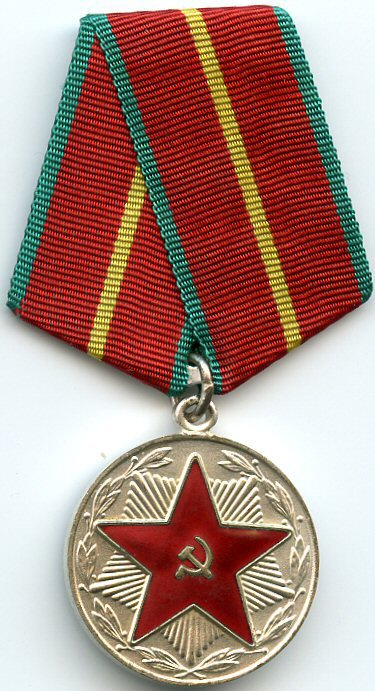
- Awards

Military service
- Allegiance: Soviet Union (to 1991); Russia
- Branch/service: Soviet Army; Russian Ground Forces
- Years of service: 1956–1999
- Rank: General of the Army
- Unit: 27th Guards Motor Rifle Division; 7th Guards Tank Division; Group of Soviet Forces in Germany
- Commands: Chief of the General Staff; 7th Guards Army

General of the Army Mikhail Petrovich Kolesnikov (Note: Russian: Михаил Петрович Колесников) (30 June 1939 – 26 March 2007) was a Russian military officer and a member of President Boris Yeltsin's administration. He briefly served as acting Minister of Defense in 1996 after Pavel Grachev was fired by Yeltsin.

== Biography ==
Kolesnikov was born on 30 June 1939 in Yeysk, Krasnodar Krai, Russian SFSR, to the family of an engineer. Their city was evacuated to the Russian Far East during World War II, and he was raised in Berdsk and Omsk. Kolesnikov graduated from the Omsk Armored Engineering School (ru:Омский автобронетанковый инженерный институт) in 1959 and was commissioned as an officer in the Soviet Ground Forces.

He served as a platoon commander for the repair of combat vehicles and senior tank technician of the training company for the training of mechanics-drivers of a motorised rifle regiment, from December 1961 he served as head of the field workshop for the repair of combat vehicles and cars of the repair shop of the tank regiment, from December 1963 he served as senior technician of the training tank company, from 1966 he served as deputy commander of the training tank company for technical training, from June 1967 he served as commander of the tank company of the training tank regiment, from September 1968 he served as deputy commander for the technical part of the tank battalion, from November 1970 as commander of the tank battalion in the 129th Motor Rifle Division of the Far Eastern Military District. From 1975 he served as tank regiment commander in the 27th Guards Motor Rifle Division, from February 1977 as chief of staff and deputy commander of the 7th Guards Tank Division in the Group of Soviet Forces in the East Germany, from March 1979 he was commander of the 17th Guards Tank Division in the Kiev Military District. In August 1981, he was sent to study at the academy. From 1983 he commanded of the 31st Army Corps (Soviet Union). From July 1984 he commanded of the 7th Guards Army in the Transcaucasian Military District.

From February 1987 he served as chief of staff and first deputy commander of the Siberian Military District. From June 1988 as chief of staff and first deputy commander-in-chief of the General Command of the Southern Direction. From October 1990 he served as Chief of the General Staff and First Deputy Commander-in-Chief of the Soviet Ground Forces. After the 1991 Soviet coup attempt, he served as Acting Commander-in-Chief of the Ground Forces for some time. From September 1991 he served as Chief of the Main Organizational and Mobilization Directorate and First Deputy Chief of the General Staff of the Soviet Armed Forces.

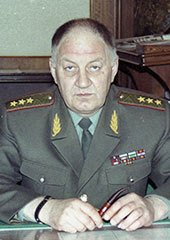
Kolesnikov as a colonel general

Following the dissolution of the Soviet Union and the establishment of the Russian Armed Forces to succeed the Soviet Armed Forces he served as Chief of General Staff of the Russian Armed Forces from 1992 to 1996. During his tenure, he did not distinguish himself in any way, instead presiding over the unprepared withdrawal of troops from abroad, the loss of combat readiness of units and formations, and the failed actions of Russian Armed Forces during the First Chechen War. In 1994-1996, he was simultaneously a member of the Security Council of the Russian Federation, and in July–November 1996, he was also a member of the Defense Council of the Russian Federation. While unable to counteract the continuing decline in the army’s combat readiness, he focused on maintaining resources for the readiness of the Strategic Missile Forces. In October 1996, he was relieved of his post as Chief of the General Staff and placed at the disposal of the Minister of Defense of the Russian Federation. In March–October 1996, he was acting chief of staff of military cooperation of the member states of the Commonwealth of Independent States. In November 1997, his candidacy was submitted by Russian president Boris Yeltsin for approval in this position on the agenda of the meeting of heads of state of the CIS members, but was not approved.

He was at the disposal of the Minister of Defense of the Russian Federation. From July 1998 he served as Chairman of the State Technical Commission under the president of the Russian Federation. In September 1999, he was relieved of his post and discharged into the reserve upon reaching the maximum age for military service.

He died on March 26, 2007. He was buried at the Troyekurovskoye Cemetery in Moscow.

== Dates of rank ==
- General-major (генерал-майор) (май 1981)
- General-lieutenant (генерал-лейтенант) (20.02.1986)
- генерал-полковник (15.10.1990)
- генерал армии (5.05.1995)

== Notes ==
Military offices
Preceded by Yuri Shatalin	Commander of the 7th Guards Army; 1984–1987	Succeeded by Yuri Kuznetsov
Preceded by Vitaly Kovalyov	Chief of Staff of the Siberian Military District; 1987–1988	Succeeded by Yuri Shebrikov
Preceded by Aleksandr Grinkevich	Chief of the Main Staff and First Deputy Commander-in-Chief of the Soviet Ground Forces; 1990–1991	Succeeded by Boris Gromov
Preceded by Valentin Varennikov	Commander-in-Chief of the Soviet Ground Forces; Acting; 1991	Succeeded by Vladimir Semyonov
Preceded by Viktor Dubynin	Chief of the General Staff of the Armed Forces of the Russian Federation; 1992–1996	Succeeded by Viktor Samsonov
Political offices
Preceded by Pavel Grachev	Minister of Defense of the Russian Federation; Acting; 1996	Succeeded by Igor Rodionov
