= Anatoly Kvashnin =

Russian military officer (1946–2022)

- Анатолий Васильевич Квашнин
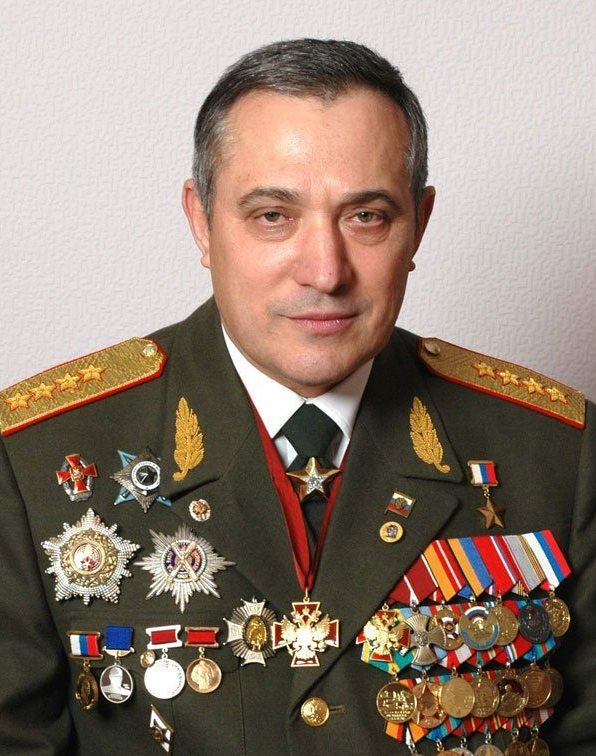
- Born: 15 August 1946; Ufa, Bashkir ASSR, Russian SFSR, Soviet Union (now Bashkortostan, Russia)
- Died: 7 January 2022 (aged 75); Moscow, Russia
- Burial place: Federal Military Memorial Cemetery
- Military career
- Allegiance: Soviet Union (to 1991); Russia
- Branch: Soviet Army; Russian Ground Forces
- Service years: 1969–2004
- Rank: General of the Army
- Commands: Chief of the General Staff; Joint Group of Forces in Chechnya; 7th Tank Army
- Conflicts: First Chechen War; War of Dagestan; Second Chechen War
- Awards
- Other work: Presidential Envoy to the Siberian Federal District (with the civilian service rank of 1st class Active State Councillor of the Russian Federation)

General of the Army Anatoly Vasilyevich Kvashnin (Note: Russian: Анатолий Васильевич Квашнин) (15 August 1946 – 7 January 2022) was a Russian military officer who served as the Chief of the General Staff of Russian Armed Forces from 1997 to 2004, when he was dismissed by President Vladimir Putin. In the period from 2004 to 2010, he was the Plenipotentiary Envoy of the President of Russia to the Siberian Federal District.

== Early life ==
Anatoly Kvashnin was born on August 15, 1946, in Ufa, Bashkir Autonomous Soviet Socialist Republic, Russian Soviet Federative Socialist Republic, Union of Soviet Socialist Republics (now Ufa, Republic of Bashkortostan, Russian Federation). His father, Vasily Iosifovich Kvashnin, was a career military officer and was honorably discharged from military service with the rank of lieutenant colonel in 1973.

== Military career ==
Kvashnin graduated from the Kurgan Machine Building Institute with specialist degree in engineering and the military department of this institute in 1969, received his officer commission as a lieutenant. He was drafted into active duty in July of the same year. He began serving in the army as deputy commander of a tank company in the 201st Motor Rifle Division. In July 1971, after the ending of his conscript military service, he decided to stay in armed forces as a volunteer and served until his discharge in September 2004.

In 1973, Kvashnin enrolled in the Malinovsky Tank Academy. After graduating three years later, Kvashnin became chief of staff of the 360th Tank Regiment of the 18th Guards Motor Rifle Division in June 1976, stationed in Czechoslovakia under the Central Group of Forces. He steadily rose to higher positions in Czechoslovakia, becoming regimental commander of the 360th in August 1978 and chief of staff of the 31st Tank Division of the group in February 1981. Kvashnin was promoted to command the 78th Tank Division of the Central Asian Military District in July 1982, and in 1987 was sent to the Soviet General Staff Academy for advanced studies.

After graduating from the academy in 1989, he was appointed deputy commander of the 28th Combined Arms Army in July of that year.

From May 7 to August 24, 1992 — Commander of the 7th Red Banner Tank Army, Republic of Belarus.

In August 1992, he became deputy chief of the Main Operative Directorate of the General Staff of the Armed Forces of the Russian Federation. Since February 1993, Kvashnin was first deputy chief of the Main Operative Directorate of the General Staff of the Armed Forces of the Russian Federation.

During First Chechen War, Kvashnin took command of the Joint Grouping of Russian Forces in Chechnya in December 1994 following the relief of Colonel General Alexey Mityukhin for the initial Russian defeats, and remained in this position until 31 January 1995. In February 1995, he replaced Mityukhin as the commander of the North Caucasus Military District.

On 19 June 1997, Anatoly Kvashnin was appointed to the position of the Chief of the General Staff of Russian Armed Forces. On 25 November 1997, he was promoted to the military rank of Army general. For leading the Russian operational headquarters directing operations against Chechen fighters during the 1999 Dagestan war, Kvashnin was made a Hero of the Russian Federation.

As Chief of the Russian General Staff he had some success in reforming the command structure for the strategic deterrent forces, but feuded with Defence Minister Sergei Ivanov and many of his subordinates. Kvashnin also proved to be indecisive at times, he split then merged the Volga-Urals Military District, combined the Strategic Rocket Forces with the Russian Space Forces and the Early Warning System, then restored their independence.

On 10 June 2000, Kvashnin became a member of the Security Council of Russia.

On 19 July 2004, Anatoly Kvashnin was released from the post of the Chief of the General Staff of Russian Armed Forces. On 9 September 2004, Kvashnin was honorably discharged from military service. He was listed in the inactive reserve until 2011 when he became a retired army general.

== Civil career ==
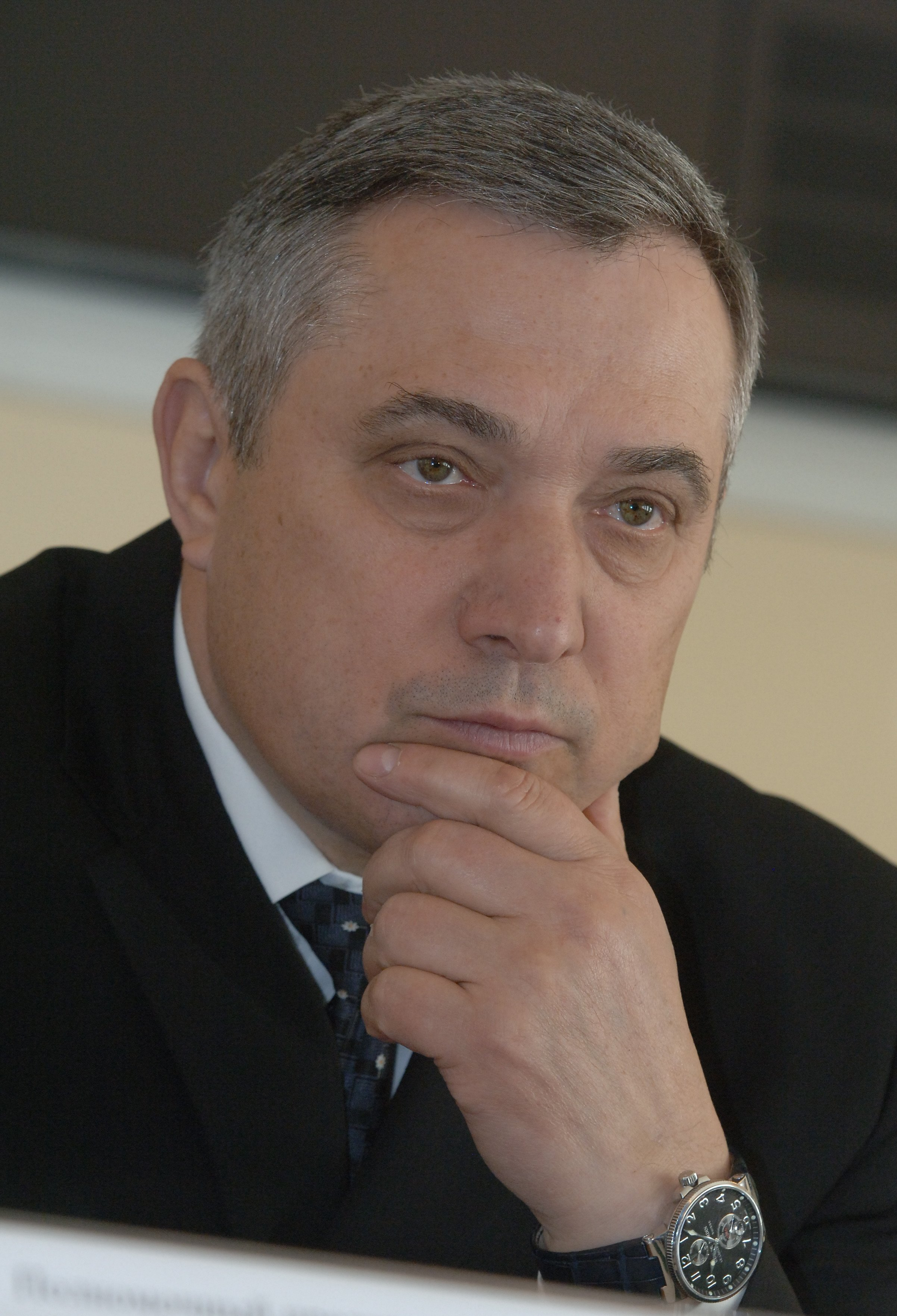
Kvashnin in 2007

On 9 September 2004, Kvashnin was appointed to the post of the Presidential Envoy to the Siberian Federal District thus becoming a civilian official. On 20 December 2004, Kvashnin was promoted to the civilian service rank of 1st class Active State Councillor of the Russian Federation.

On 9 September 2010, he was released from the post of the Presidential Envoy to the Siberian Federal District and was honorably discharged from civilian service. On 20 September 2010, Kvashnin ceased to be a member of the Security Council of Russia.

== Academic career ==
Kvashnin held a candidate of sciences degree in sociological sciences (1997), a doctor of sciences degree in military sciences (2004) and was a corresponding member of the Russian Academy of Rocket and Artillery Sciences.

== Later life and death ==
In the last years of his life Kvashnin lived in Novosibirsk with his family.

Kvashnin died on 7 January 2022, at the age of 75, from COVID-19 during the COVID-19 pandemic in Russia. He was buried in the Federal Military Memorial Cemetery on 10 January 2022.

== Honours and awards ==
- Hero of the Russian Federation (October 27, 1999)
- Order of Merit for the Fatherland;
  - 2nd Class (September 14, 2010)
  - 3rd Class (July 19, 2004) – for great contribution to strengthening national defence and many years of conscientious service
  - 4th Class (2001)
- Order of Alexander Nevsky (October 3, 2016)
- Order of Courage
- Order of Honour (August 21, 2006) – a contribution to strengthening Russian statehood and many years of conscientious service
- Order for Service to the Homeland in the Armed Forces of the USSR, 3rd Class (January 8, 1980)
- Medal "In Commemoration of the 850th Anniversary of Moscow"
- Medal "For Merit in the Conduct of the All-Russian Population Census"
- Jubilee Medal "In Commemoration of the 100th Anniversary since the Birth of Vladimir Il'ich Lenin"
- Medal "Veteran of the Armed Forces of the USSR"
- Medal "For the Development of Virgin Lands"
- Jubilee Medal "50 Years of the Armed Forces of the USSR"
- Jubilee Medal "60 Years of the Armed Forces of the USSR"
- Jubilee Medal "70 Years of the Armed Forces of the USSR"
- Medal "For military valor", 1st Class (Russian Ministry of Defence)
- Medal "June 12, 1999 Bosnia-Kosovo" from nickel-silver for Number 1 (2000, Russian Ministry of Defence)
- Two Medal "For Strengthening Military Cooperation" (Russian Ministry of Defence)
- Medal "For diligence in carrying out engineering tasks" (Russian Ministry of Defence)
- Order of the Holy Prince Daniel of Moscow (Russian Orthodox Church, 2000)
- Honorary Citizen of Makhachkala (2000)

Foreign awards:

- Officer of the National Order of the Legion of Honour (France, 2004)
- Order of the Yugoslav Star (Federal Republic of Yugoslavia, 1999)

== Notes ==
Military offices
Preceded by Viktor Isaichenkov	Commander of the 7th Tank Army; 1992	Succeeded by Mikhail Kozlov
Preceded by Aleksey Mityukhin	Commander of the Joint Group of Forces in Chechnya; 1994–1995	Succeeded by Anatoly Kulikov
Preceded by Aleksey Mityukhin	Commander of the North Caucasus Military District; 1995–1997	Succeeded by Viktor Kazantsev
Preceded by Viktor Samsonov	Chief of the General Staff of the Armed Forces of the Russian Federation; 1997–2004	Succeeded by Yuri Baluyevsky
Government offices
Preceded by Leonid Drachevsky	Presidential Envoy to the Siberian Federal District; 2004–2010	Succeeded by Viktor Tolokonsky
