= Boris Gromov =

Russian politician and ex-military officer (born 1943)

- Борис Громов
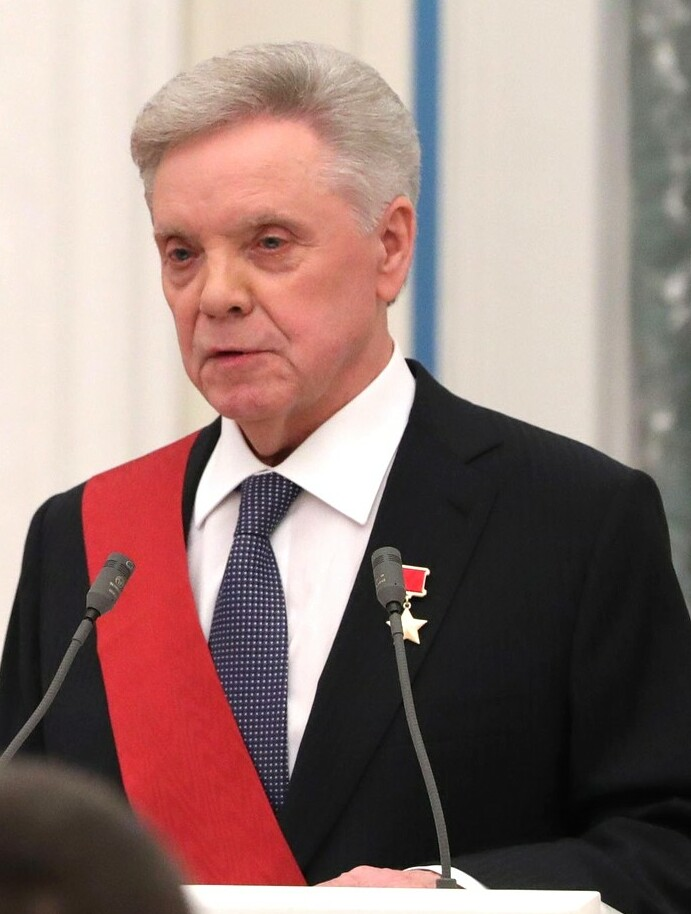
- Gromov in 2018

Member of the State Duma (Party List Seat)
- In office 21 June 2013 – 5 October 2016
- Preceded by: Dmitry Sablin
- In office 18 January 2000 – 28 January 2000
- Succeeded by: Alexander Vladislavlev

Russian Federation Senator from Moscow Oblast
- Representing the Executive
- In office 12 May 2012 – 21 June 2013
- Preceded by: Nikolay Churkin
- Succeeded by: Dmitry Sablin

2nd Governor of Moscow Oblast
- In office 2 February 2000 – 11 May 2012
- Preceded by: Vasily Golubev (acting); Anatoly Tyazhlov
- Succeeded by: Sergei Shoigu

Member of the Federation Council from Moscow Oblast
- ex-officio as Governor
- In office 16 February 2000 – 1 January 2002
- Preceded by: Anatoly Tyazhlov
- Succeeded by: Nikolay Churkin (as Senator)

Member of the State Duma for Saratov Oblast
- In office 17 January 1996 – 18 January 2000
- Preceded by: Anatoly Gordeev
- Succeeded by: Valery Rashkin
- Constituency: Saratov (No. 158)

Personal details
- Born: 7 November 1943 (age 83) Saratov, RSFSR, USSR
- Party: CPSU (until 1991); Fatherland – All Russia (1998–2002); United Russia (from 2002)
- Spouses: Natalya Nikolaevna Gromova (née Belyakova, died 1985); Faina Alexandrovna Gromova (fmr. Krapivina, m. 1990)
- Children: Maxim; Andrey; Valentina; Evgeniya; Elizaveta
- Parents: Vsevolod Alexeyevich Gromov (father); Marina Dmitrievna Gromova (mother)
- Education: Leningrad Higher Combined Arms Command School; Frunze Academy; Voroshilov Academy
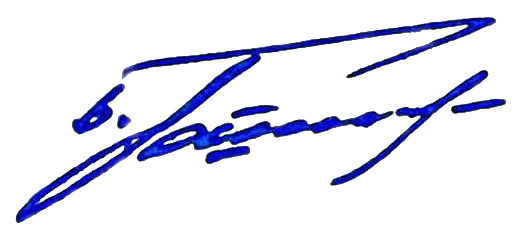
- Signature

Military service
- Allegiance: Soviet Union; Russian Federation
- Branch/service: Soviet Ground Forces; Russian Ground Forces
- Years of service: 1962–2002
- Rank: Colonel General
- Commands: 5th Guards Motor Rifle Division (1980–1982); 28th Army (1986–1987); 40th Army (1987–1989); Kiev Military District (1989–1990)
- Battles/wars: Soviet-Afghan War; Operation Curtain; Siege of Khost; Operation Magistral; Operation Typhoon; Soviet Withdrawal

Boris Vsevolodovich Gromov (Russian: Бори́с Все́володович Гро́мов; born 7 November 1943) is a Russian politician and former military officer. He was the Governor of Moscow Oblast between January 2000 and May 2012. Deployed thrice to fight in the Soviet–Afghan War, Gromov was the last Soviet soldier in Afghanistan on 15 February 1989; he commanded the 40th Army and oversaw the Soviet withdrawal as the last personnel retreated.

== Early life and education ==
Born 7 November 1943 in Saratov, Russian SFSR, Soviet Union, he graduated from a Suvorov military cadet school, the Leningrad Military Commanders School and later from the Frunze Military Academy in Moscow, as well as the General Staff Academy.

== Military career ==
During the Soviet–Afghan War, Gromov did three tours of duty (1980–1982, 1985–1986, 1987–1989), and was best known for the two years as the last Commander of the 40th Army in Afghanistan. Gromov was the last Soviet soldier to leave Afghanistan, crossing on foot the Friendship Bridge spanning the Amu-Daria river on 15 February 1989, the day the Soviet pullout from Afghanistan was completed. He received the highest military award – the golden star of the Hero of the Soviet Union after Operation Magistral had lifted the siege of the city of Khost in eastern Afghanistan.

During the Red Army withdrawal in February 1989, 30 to 40 military trucks crammed with Afghan historical treasures crossed into the Soviet Union, under Gromov's orders. He cut an antique Tekke carpet stolen from Darul Aman Palace into several pieces, and gave it to his acquaintances.

== Early political career ==
After the Afghan War, he was chosen as a candidate for vice president by the Communist Party in the Russian presidential election of 1991 (the candidate for president was former premier Nikolai Ryzhkov).

He served as First Deputy Defence Minister of the Russian Federation. In 1994, Gromov retired from the Russian Armed Forces, and was soon appointed deputy Interior Minister. Also in 1994, Gromov publicly warned against Russian military intervention in Chechnya, arguing that the army was unprepared for such a conflict, which was a bold stance against the Defense Ministry. He was elected, in 1995, to the State Duma, lower house of the Russian parliament.

== Governor of Moscow Oblast ==
=== First term (2000–2003) ===
In January 2000, he was elected governor of the Moscow Oblast and re-elected in December 2003.

=== Second term (2003–2007) ===
In June 2003, Boris Gromov announced his intention to run for a second term as governor of the Moscow Oblast.

On 28 August, at a conference of the Moscow Oblast branch of the United Russia party, Gromov was invited to head the party's regional list in the State Duma elections. In September, he was included in the federal list of the United Russia party No. 1 in the Moscow Oblast regional group to participate in the elections to the 4th State Duma.

On 17 September 2003, deputies of the Moscow Oblast Duma granted Gromov's request to shorten his term of office and scheduled elections for the governor of the Moscow Oblast for 7 December 2003 and combine them with parliamentary ones (Gromov's term of office was supposed to expire in February 2004). On 2 October, Gromov announced that he intended to run for governor again as an independent candidate. By 6 November, Gromov had collected the 80 thousand voter signatures required by law to register as a candidate.

On 7 December 2003, the legislative and gubernatorial elections took place on the same day. Gromov was elected as a deputy in the legislative election but again refused the mandate. He also won the gubernatorial elections with 83% of the votes; in second place was "against everyone" (9.69%); in third place was Aleksey Mitrofanov (4.12%).

From 19 December 2003 to 19 July 2004, Gromov was a member of the Presidium of the State Council of the Russian Federation.

On 27 November 2004, at the United Russia party congress, Gromov was elected to the party's Supreme Council.

On 22 November 2005, President of Belarus Alexander Lukashenko awarded Gromov the Order of Friendship of Peoples.

At the end of November 2005, Gromov officially joined the United Russia party at the party congress in Krasnoyarsk. He received his party card in December.

One of the largest road projects that Gromov supported was the construction of the toll Central Ring Road (TsKAD), which was supposed to significantly relieve congestion on many highways in Moscow and the Moscow Oblast, as well as the construction of the Moscow-St. Petersburg expressway. The decision on the expressway was made by the Russian authorities in 2004. On 28 April 2006, Gromov signed a decree of the Moscow Oblast government regulating its construction in the Moscow Oblast. According to the project, the construction of the highway was supposed to lead to the deforestation of 1000 hectares of the Khimki Forest Park, which caused a strong public outcry and a protracted conflict. In August 2010, President Dmitry Medvedev suspended construction through the Khimki Forest, but Gromov continued to insist on building a road according to the previously approved project. In December 2010, a special commission of the Russian government supported the road construction project.

=== Third term (2007–2012) ===
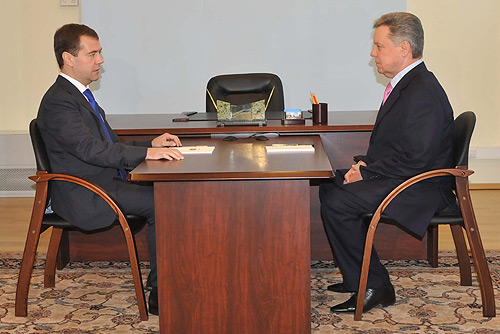
With President Dmitry Medvedev, 14 October 2008

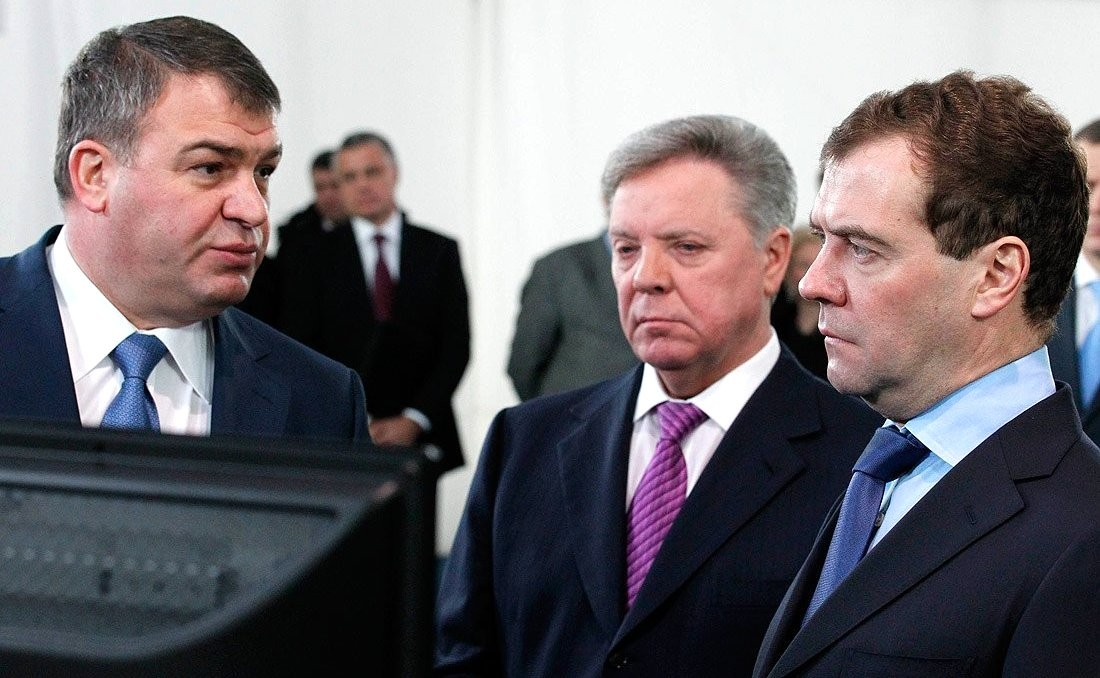
With President Medvedev and Defense Minister Anatoly Serdyukov, January 2011

According to the law, the powers of Gromov's second five-year term as governor expired only in 2008. On 18 April 2007, reporting to President Putin on the situation in the Moscow Oblast, Gromov turned to Putin with a question of trust. On 2 May, Putin submitted to the Moscow Oblast Duma (elected in March) the candidacy of Boris Gromov for approval as head of the government of the Moscow Oblast. On 4 May, Putin appointed Gromov governor of the Moscow Oblast for a third term with the wording "in connection with successes in the development of the region." Gromov's candidacy for the post of governor was unanimously supported by deputies of the 4th Moscow Oblast Duma, with all 50 members voting for him.

At the beginning of 2009, the Moscow Oblast faced a financial emergency. By 1 June, the debt of the Moscow Oblast amounted to 155.2 billion rubles, exceeding the maximum permissible amount by 1%. At the same time, Gromov was forced to dismiss his first deputy, Vice-Governor Alexei Panteleyev (formally, Panteleyev went on vacation of his own free will, followed by dismissal).

Subsequently, Governor Gromov continued to recruit a team of senior officials in the region. In May, the Moscow Oblast Duma adopted amendments to the oblast's charter, allowing the appointment of two instead of one vice-governor. Nikolai Sedov, previously deputy head of the Federal Taxation Service, was appointed to the new position. Sedov's sphere of authority included supervising the financial and economic block. Deputies also approved two new deputy prime ministers of the Moscow Oblast - Vladimir Zhidkin, who had previously served as deputy chairman, and Roman Agapov, the former head of the government apparatus.

In June 2010, due to planned track repairs, Russian Railways reduced the number of commuter trains departing from the Moscow Kursky railway station, which led to a significant increase in the load on the transport network of the Moscow Oblast. The greatest problems arose on the Leningradskoye Highway and the Gorkovsky suburban railway line. On 2 July, Boris Gromov commented on the logistical collapse on the Leningradskoye Highway: "I fly in a helicopter. You must also buy helicopters instead of cars - you don't need roads."

On 1 September 2010, Gromov announced that he insisted on the construction of the Moscow–Saint Petersburg motorway through the Khimki Forest, declaring his intention to send letters to President Dmitry Medvedev and the Chairman of the Russian Government Vladimir Putin.

On 9 February 2011, the newspaper Vek reported with reference to representatives of the public movement "NO to Gromov": "Governor Gromov demanded that in the elections on 4 March, 75% of the votes be secured for presidential candidate Vladimir Putin. Thus, he intends to make amends for the failure of the United Russia party in the last State Duma elections: the party of power received less than 33% of the votes, which is almost 2 times less votes compared to 2007 [...] The current governor and his entourage," activists say, "count that Vladimir Putin's resounding success in the Moscow Oblast on 4 March will give hope for the reappointment of Boris Gromov."

==== 2011 Russian legislative election and alleged electoral fraud ====
In September 2011, Boris Gromov was included in the lists of the United Russia party, which were then nominated in the federal and Moscow Oblast Duma legislative elections in December 2011 on the single voting day. In State Duma elections, Gromov was number one in the Moscow Oblast regional group. In Moscow Oblast Duma elections, Gromov headed United Russia's list.

According to the results of the State Duma elections, United Russia won 33.5% of the votes in the Moscow Oblast and the corresponding regional group received 7 mandates. On 10 December, a list of elected deputies was published, including Gromov. According to the results of the elections to the Moscow Oblast Duma, United Russia gained 33.18% and received 9 mandates. At these elections, Gromov also received a deputy mandate.

However, Gromov, who did not hide his participation in the elections as a "parovoz," refused both mandates. As a result, on 15 December, the mandate of the State Duma deputy was transferred to Vladimir Kononov (No. 8 in the regional group of the Moscow Oblast), and the mandate of the Moscow Oblast Duma deputy was transferred to the Minister of Ecology of the Moscow Oblast, Alla Kachan.

On 24 October 2011, State Duma deputy Gennady Gudkov published the abstracts of a report from 6 October from the Odintsovsky District for Governor Gromov with a plan to prepare for election fraud in the Moscow Oblast. According to Gudkov, the violations are not limited to one report: "On 15 September, the regional Minister of Press and Information Sergei Moiseev "instructed" 56 editors-in-chief of regional and municipal media in approximately the same style. As a result, in the Moscow Oblast, the multi-party system has been de facto abolished, the activities of opposition parties and social movements "inconvenient" for the governor are prohibited, and preparations for rigged "elections" are in full swing."

On 25 November, Nezavisimaya Gazeta published a retelling of Gromov's speech at a meeting of representatives of the sphere of vocational education of the Moscow Oblast with Gromov and the oblast's Minister of Education, L. N. Antonova, at the Government House of the Moscow Oblast in Krasnogorsk on 23 November. Gromov said that United Russia's rating in the Moscow Oblast is about 30% and that he sees no objective reasons for such a decline in indicators.

==== End of term and successor ====
Officially, Gromov's powers in his last 5-year term as governor of the Moscow Oblast expired on 11 May 2012. Under Article 26.1 of the Federal Law of 11 July 2001 No. 95-FZ "On Political Parties", consultations of a person authorized by the President of the Russian Federation, Dmitry Medvedev, with the United Russia party on the issue of nominating candidates for the post of governor of the Moscow Oblast were to be held no later than 45 days before the expiration of the governor's term of office - that is, before 19 March. Proposals for candidacies were to be submitted to the President no later than 40 days before the expiration of the governor's term of office - that is, before 24 March.

In March, after the presidential elections, which Vladimir Putin won, the question arose about a new candidacy for the post of governor. Gromov's departure from the governor's post was not unexpected since, due to the large number of unresolved problems in the oblast that had accumulated during the 12 years of his governorship, the end of his career had been predicted for the last few years.

Experts named among Gromov's possible successors the head of the Ministry of Transport Igor Levitin, the head of the Ministry of Regional Development Viktor Basargin, the head of the Ministry of Natural Resources Yury Trutnev, and the head of the Supreme Council of United Russia and ex-Speaker of the State Duma Boris Gryzlov. On 30 March 2012, the Head of the Russian Ministry of Emergency Situations, Sergei Shoigu, announced his readiness to become the governor of the Moscow Oblast if this post is entrusted to him by decision of the President of Russia with the support of the parliament of the Moscow Oblast.

Alexey Mukhin, political scientist and General Director of the Center for Political Information, said:

In fact, Gromov's resignation was not only not rushed, but also clearly delayed; it should have been done a long time ago. Judging by the problems accumulated in the region, by the oblast's growing budget deficit, by the mood of citizens, in the end, the resignation of Boris Gromov should have happened not just yesterday, but the day before yesterday. The situation in the Moscow Oblast is already so tense that you just need to hurry up with this personnel decision, otherwise "angry citizens" will appear here too.

Pavel Salin, political scientist and leading expert of the Center for Russian Political Conjuncture, assessed the prospects of Boris Gromov:

Judging by the fact that Gromov is of advanced age, but at the same time not yet an old man, he can hardly count on any position in the nomenklatura. Most likely, he will go to the GR structure of some large company that has interests in the Moscow Oblast, and will work there as a "notebook," since over the course of 10 years he has placed quite a lot of his people in key positions in the region. The new governor will not be able to quickly replace them, and Gromov will have 1-3 years to be able to directly call some official who owes him a career in the Moscow Oblast and ask him for something. This is what he will feed on. In principle, a standard career for this type of retiree.

— "Новым главой Подмосковья станет человек Собянина?" [Will Sobyanin's man become the new head of the Moscow region?] (in Russian). 14 March 2012. Archived from the original on 15 March 2012.

On 23 March 2012, Boris Gromov announced that he had decided to appeal to the President of Russia and the Supreme Council of the United Russia party with a request not to consider him as a candidate for governor of the oblast for the next period. The message released by Gromov's press service said:

My term of office expires in May, I have carried out these high duties for 12 years and I believe that this is quite enough. I would like to express my sincere gratitude to the residents of the oblast, the heads of municipalities, everyone with whom I have worked over these years. We have gone through a lot, including very difficult times, but we managed to make the Moscow Oblast a leader among Russian regions in many areas of socio-economic development. And I am proud of it.

— "Борис Громов больше не претендует на кресло губернатора" [Boris Gromov no longer claims to be governor] (in Russian). Rossiyskaya Gazeta. 26 March 2012. Archived from the original on 1 December 2017.

In summarizing the 12-year reign of the Governor-General, Forbes noted: "the concentration of economic problems and corruption scandals in Gromov's domain seems desperately high even by Russian standards."

== Deputy of the 6th State Duma ==
On 21 June 2013, the Central Election Commission of Russia registered Boris Gromov as a deputy of the 6th State Duma from the United Russia party. The vacant deputy mandate was offered to Gromov after the early termination of the deputy powers of Dmitry Sablin, a member of the United Russia faction. Sablin voluntarily resigned from the lower house of parliament. The head of the Central Election Commission, Vladimir Churov, personally presented Gromov with the certificate of a 6th State Duma deputy. Gromov received the mandate even though in December 2011, immediately after the legislative election, he refused it. This became possible after, in March 2013, the Constitutional Court of Russia determined that the governing body of a political party, if it has objective reasons for this, has the right to deviate from the order of candidates when transferring the vacant mandate of a State Duma deputy. In the regional group "Moscow Oblast" of the list of the United Russia party in the legislative elections, Gromov was number 1 and Sablin was number 5. In December 2014, the Constitutional Court prohibited the re-transfer of the mandate to candidates who had previously abandoned it for the sake of work in executive bodies, as violating the principle of separation of powers.

== Awards and recognition ==
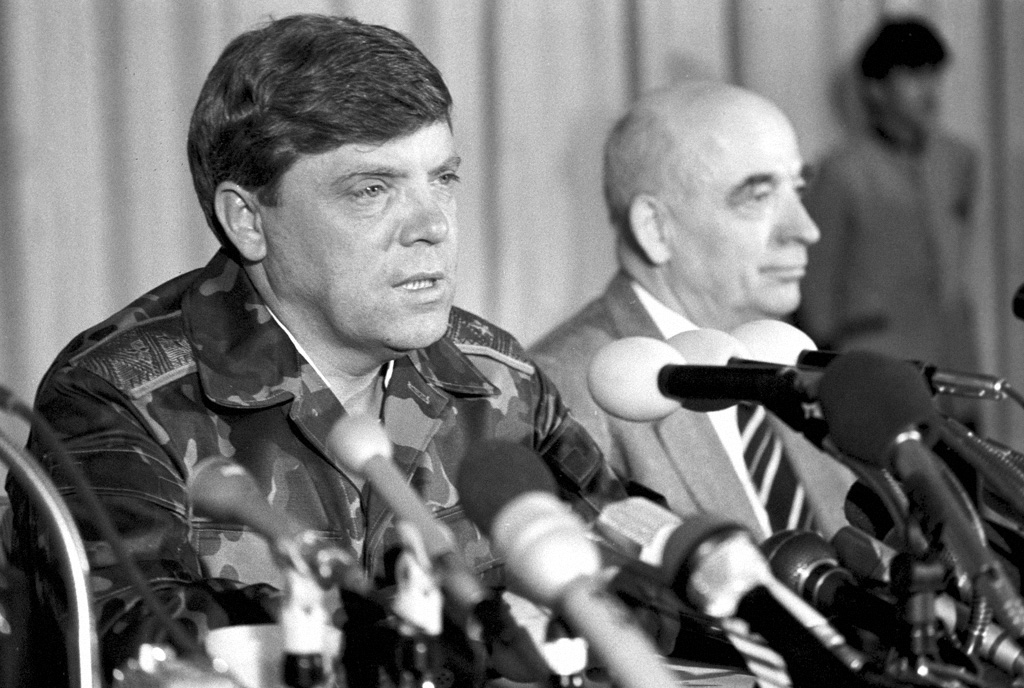
Gromov, then a colonel general, announces withdrawal of Soviet army from Afghanistan in 1989

- Hero of the Soviet Union
- Order of Lenin
- Order of the Red Banner, twice
- Order of the Red Star
- Order for Service to the Homeland in the Armed Forces of the USSR, 3rd class
- Medal for Combat Service
- Medal "For merits in perpetuating the memory of the fallen defenders of the Fatherland" (Russian Ministry of Defence, 2008) — for his great personal contribution to the commemoration of the fallen defenders of the Fatherland, the establishment of names of the dead and the fate of missing servicemen, displaying high moral and business qualities, diligence and intelligent initiative, to assist in the task of perpetuating the memory of the fallen defenders of the Fatherland
- Order of Merit for the Fatherland;
  - 1st class (2018)
  - 2nd class (6 November 2003) – for outstanding contribution to strengthening Russian statehood, and socio-economic development of the region
  - 3rd class
  - 4th class (7 November 2008) – for outstanding contribution to the socio-economic development of the Moscow region and many years of fruitful work
- Medal "For Impeccable Service" 1st, 2nd and 3rd classes
- Order of Prince Yaroslav the Wise, 5th class (Ukraine, 7 November 2003)
- Medal "10 Years of the Armed Forces of Ukraine"
- Order of Friendship of Peoples (Belarus) (22 November 2005) – for his significant contribution to the development of economic, scientific-technological and cultural ties between Belarus and Moscow Oblast of the Russian Federation
- Medal "In memory of the 10th anniversary of the withdrawal of Soviet troops from Afghanistan" (Belarus, 13 February 2003) – for his great personal contribution to the development and strengthening of cooperation between movements of Afghan War Veterans of the Republic of Belarus and the Russian Federation
- Medal "Fidelity" (Afghanistan, 17 November 1988)
- Order of St. Prince Vladimir Equal, 1st class (Russian Orthodox Church, 2008) – in consideration of special services for the Moscow diocese of the Russian Orthodox Church and the 65th anniversary of the birth
- Order of the Holy Prince Daniel of Moscow, 1st class
- Order of St. Sergius
- Order of Saint Blessed Grand Prince Dmitry Donskoy, 1st class
- Jubilee Medal "In Commemoration of the 100th Anniversary since the Birth of Vladimir Il'ich Lenin"
- Jubilee Medal "Twenty Years of Victory in the Great Patriotic War 1941–1945"
- Jubilee Medal "50 Years of the Armed Forces of the USSR"
- Jubilee Medal "60 Years of the Armed Forces of the USSR"
- Jubilee Medal "70 Years of the Armed Forces of the USSR"
- Order of the Red Banner (Afghanistan)
- Order of Honour (2012)

== See also ==
- Nikolai Ryzhkov presidential campaign, 1991
- Austin S. Miller
- Chris Donahue

Military offices
Preceded by Viktor Dubynin	Commander of the 40th Army in Afghanistan; 1987–1989	Position abolished
Preceded by Vladimir Osipov	Commander of the Kiev Military District; 1989–1990	Succeeded by Viktor Chechevatov
Preceded by Mikhail Kolesnikov	Chief of the Main Staff and First Deputy Commander-in-Chief of the Soviet Ground Forces; 1991–1992	Position abolished
Position established	Chief of the Main Staff and First Deputy Commander-in-Chief of the Russian Ground Forces; 1992	Succeeded by Yuri Bukreyev
Political offices
Preceded by Anatoly Tyazhlov	Governor of Moscow Oblast; 2000–2012	Succeeded by Sergey Shoygu
