= Igor Puzanov =

Russian military officer and politician (1947–2023)

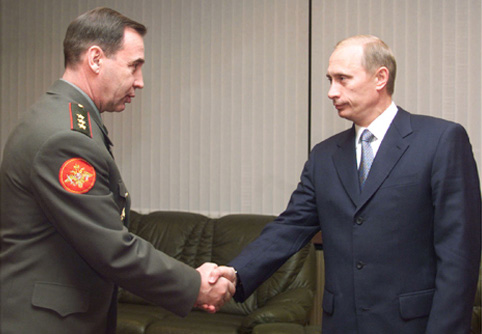
- Puzanov (left) with Vladimir Putin in 2000

Member of the State Duma
- In office 24 December 2007 – 21 December 2011

Personal details
- Born: Igor Yevgenyevich Puzanov; 31 January 1947 Tyumen, Russian SFSR, USSR
- Died: 22 October 2023 (aged 76) Moscow, Russia
- Party: United Russia
- Education: Omsk State Technical University; Frunze Military Academy
- Occupation: Military officer

Military service
- Allegiance: Russian Federation from 1991
- Rank: General of the Army

Igor Yevgenyevich Puzanov (Russian: Игорь Евгеньевич Пузанов; 31 January 1947 – 22 October 2023) was a Russian military officer and politician. A member of United Russia, he served in the State Duma from 2007 to 2011.

== Biography ==
He was born on January 31, 1947 in Tyumen.

In 1968, he graduated from the Omsk State Technical University and its military department. Was called up for military service as an officer for two years. After the expiration of the term of service in 1970, he filed a report on enrollment in the cadre of officers of the Soviet Army. Graduated from the Omsk Higher Combined Arms Command School in 1971. Graduated from the Frunze Military Academy in 1976. Participated in combat operations in the Afghan War from 1979.

In 1988 graduated from the Military Academy of the General Staff of the Armed Forces of Russia. Since 1991 – Lieutenant General.

Since 1992 – First Deputy Commander of the Moscow Military District. Since 1999 – Commander of the Moscow Military District. In 1999, he became Colonel General.

On March 9, 2005, he was appointed commander of the troops of the Leningrad Military District. BecameGeneral of the Army by decree of the President of the Russian Federation on December 27, 2005.

In December 2007, he was elected a deputy to the 5th State Duma, which had him retired from the Armed Forces. In the State Duma he was a member of the Defense Committee and the Commission for the Review of Federal Budget Expenditures for Defense and State Security of the Russian Federation.

Retired since January 26, 2012.

Puzanov died in Moscow on October 22, 2023, at the age of 76.

== Awards ==
- Order "For Merit to the Fatherland" IV degree (January 11, 2007)
- Order of Military Merit
- Order of the Red Banner
- Order of the Red Star
- Order "For Service to the Homeland in the Armed Forces of the USSR" III degree
- Russian Federation Presidential Certificate of Honour (2017)
