= Igor Rodionov =

Soviet and Russian general and politician

- Игорь Родионов
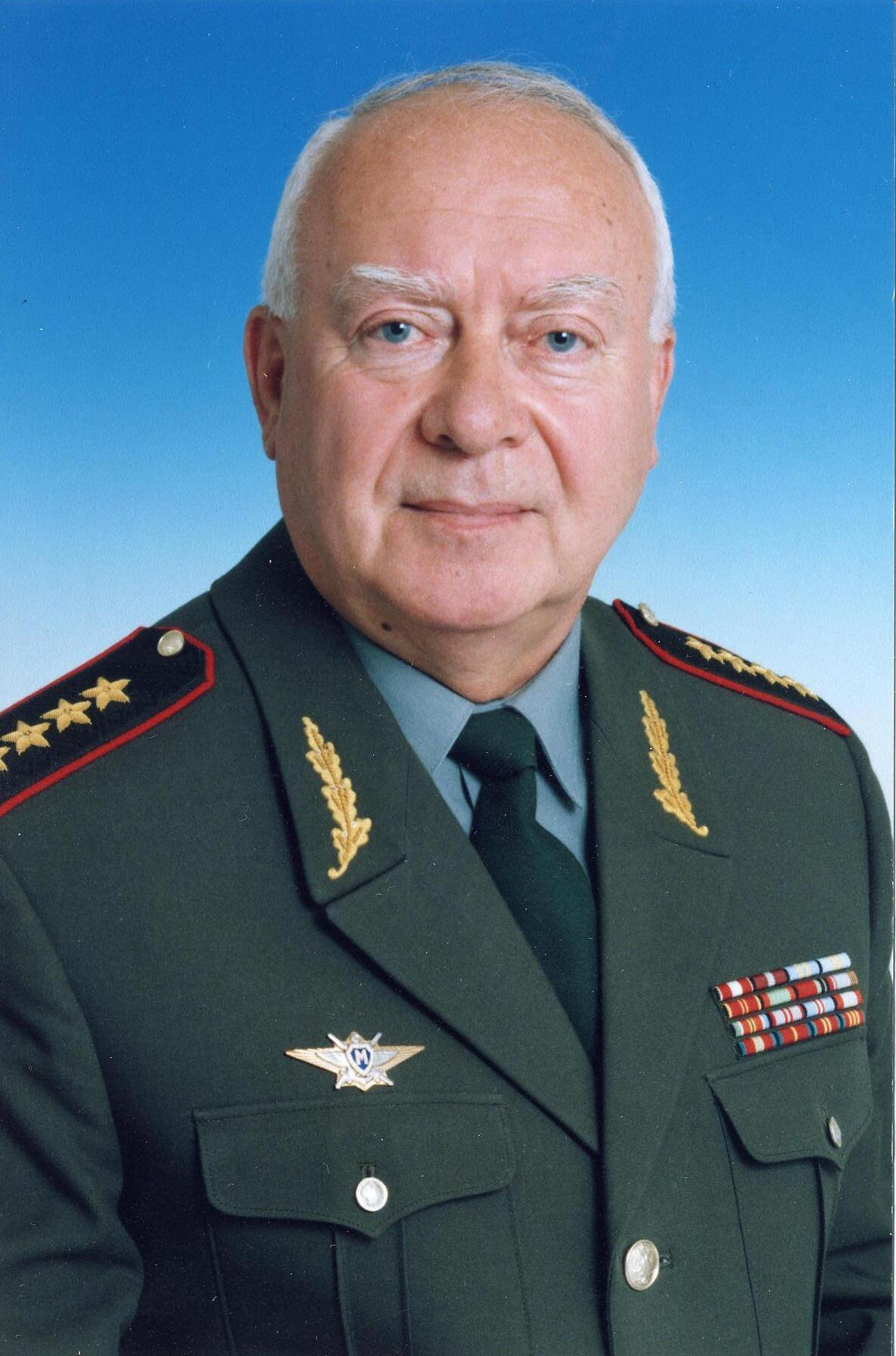
- Official portrait, 1997

3rd Minister of Defence
- In office 17 July 1996 – 22 May 1997
- President: Boris Yeltsin
- Prime Minister: Viktor Chernomyrdin
- Preceded by: Mikhail Kolesnikov (acting)
- Succeeded by: Igor Sergeyev

Personal details
- Born: Igor Nikolayevich Rodionov; Игорь Николаевич Родионов; 1 December 1936 Kurakino Village, Penza Oblast, Russian SFSR, USSR
- Died: 19 December 2014 (aged 78) Moscow, Russia
- Resting place: Federal Military Memorial Cemetery, Moscow Oblast

Military service
- Allegiance: Soviet Union (1954–1991); Russia (1991–1997)
- Branch/service: Russian Ground Forces
- Years of service: 1954–1997
- Rank: General of the Army
- Unit: 40th Army (Soviet Union)
- Commands: Ministry of Defense of the Russian Federation; Transcaucasian Military District
- Battles/wars: Soviet–Afghan War; First Chechen War
- Awards: Order of the Red Banner; Order of the Red Star (2); Order for Service to the Homeland in the Armed Forces of the USSR, 2nd class and 3rd class

Igor Nikolayevich Rodionov (Russian: Игорь Николаевич Родионов; 1 December 1936 – 19 December 2014) was a Russian general and Duma deputy. He is best known as a hardline politician, and for his service heading the Defence Ministry of the Russian Federation.

== Career ==
Rodionov served as a Soviet Army officer in East Germany, Czechoslovakia, the Far East and several other areas around the world. Then-Major Rodionov commanded a motorized rifle regiment in the famed 24th Motorized Rifle Division (the "Iron Division") in the Carpathian Military District from 1970 to 1973, and later commanded the 17th Motor Rifle Division in the same District. He commanded the 5th Army in the Far East Military District from 1983 to 1985 and then the key 40th Army in Afghanistan in 1985–1986. He held the post of First Deputy Chief Commander of the Moscow Military District from 1986 until 1988, when Colonel General Rodionov was appointed Commander of the Transcaucasus Military District.

Rodionov was held responsible for the violent repression of demonstrations in April 1989 during the April 9 protests in Tbilisi, during which 19 people were killed and hundreds injured. He was removed from his post and assigned to the General Staff Academy, which was one of the traditional Soviet dumping grounds for those who fell out of favor. However, Based on Rodionov's politics, personality, career roster, and consistent opposition to the use of army troops in the city, there is good reason to believe that he served as a scapegoat for the events. The Sobchak commission investigating the tragedy established the orders to clear the demonstrators originated from Defence Minister Yazov, at the request of Republican level Communist Party officials. Yazov and Rodionov were personal enemies and laying the blame on him was convenient for the Politburo generally and Yazov personally. The deaths themselves were the result of the units involved treating it as "military operation" which "was not corrected in accordance with the actual situation" (the number of protesters present far exceeded what was expected). The soldiers deployed, especially the VDV unit, where not equipped or trained for controlling civil disturbances and the operation was poorly planned.

From 1989 to 1996, he served as a People's Deputy and as the head of the General Staff Academy.

In the leadup to the 1996 presidential election, Russian president Boris Yeltsin dismissed Defence Minister Pavel Grachev and replaced him with Rodionov. Rodionov had had many military doctrinal articles published, and coming from command of the General Staff Academy had a background in analysis which Grachev lacked. During Rodionov's term the major factors obstructing Armed Forces reform were mainly political.

Rodionov did have ideas for reforming the armed forces, but thought that the general outlook of the Cold War ought to remain; Russia had been and would continue to be an adversary of the West, and the threat perception and budget levels should be designed on that basis. Over the course of his tenure as defence minister, he changed his mind over whether the Armed Forces should be restructured to Russia's new circumstances, or whether Russia should continue, in the Soviet style, to place the military above social and economic needs. At the start of his term, he appeared to be convinced of fitting the Army to the state; eventually he was dismissed because he would not forswear fitting the state to the Army. His attitude was revealed in comments such as 'it is ... impermissible to solve society's ... problems at the cost of lowering the state's main attribute, the army'.

Rodionov was eventually dismissed for two reasons. First, he had refused to subordinate the Ministry to civilian control in the form of the short-lived Defence Council. Secondly, he had had a major dispute with Yuriy Baturin, of the Defence Council, over whether reform was possible within the budgetary resources the state had available. Rodionov insisted it was not, and much more money would have to be spent; Baturin argued that the military would have to make do with the then current spending levels, as increases were fiscally impossible. Neither man would give up his position, and reform was not being achieved, so Yeltsin solved the problem by firing Rodionov.

A State Duma member (Movement in Support of the Army and Rodina faction) since 1999, Igor Rodionov was a member of the Committee on National Security and Chairman of the Professional Union of Military Personnel. He died in 2014 and was buried at the Federal Military Memorial Cemetery in Moscow Oblast.

Political offices
Preceded by Mikhail Kolesnikov	Defence Minister of the Russian Federation; 1996–1997	Succeeded by Igor Sergeyev
