= Army general (Russia) =

Military rank in the Russian Federation

General of the army Генера́л а́рмии
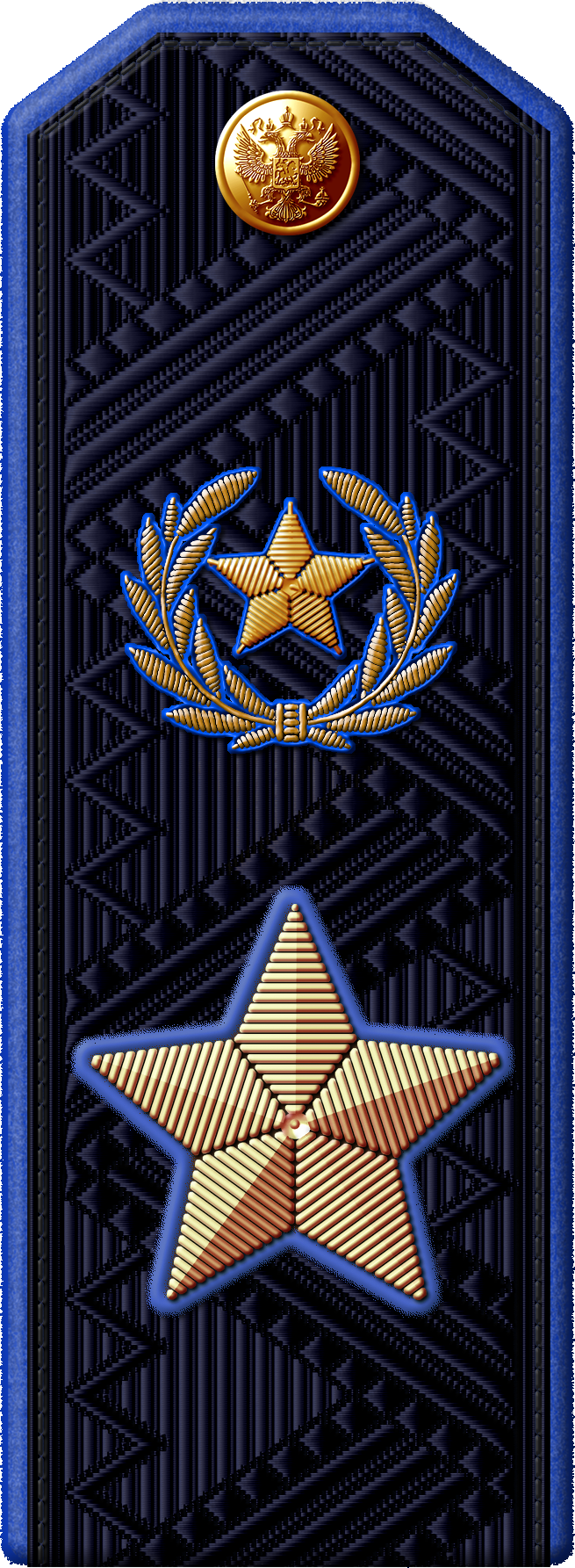
- Service uniform shoulder boards since 2013
- Country: Russia
- Service branch: Ground Forces; Strategic Rocket Forces; Aerospace Forces; Airborne Forces; Federal Security Service
- Rank group: General officer
- Rank: Four-star rank
- Formation: December 1991
- Next higher rank: Marshal of the Russian Federation
- Next lower rank: Colonel general
- Equivalent ranks: Admiral of the fleet (Navy); 1st class Active State Councillor of the Russian Federation (civil service)

Related articles
- History: General of the army (Soviet Union)

Army general or general of the army (Note: Russian: Генера́л а́рмии, romanized: Generál ármii, lit. 'general of the army') is the second highest military rank in Russia, the equivalent of a four-star rank, subordinate only to a marshal of the Russian Federation and superior to a colonel general. It is a direct counterpart of the Soviet rank of army general.

At present, general of the army is the equivalent of a four-star rank in the Russian Ground Forces (SV), Aerospace Forces (VKS), Strategic Rocket Forces (RVSN), Airborne Forces (VDV), and the Federal Security Service (FSB). The corresponding rank to general of the army in the Russian Navy is admiral of the fleet. Several other government agencies of Russia have their own equivalents (e.g. general of the police, general of the judiciary).

On appointment as minister of defense on 7 May 1992, Pavel Grachev was the first officer in the Russian Federation to have been promoted to this rank.

== Rank insignia history ==
Since 2013, the rank insignia has been one big star and the army emblem on straps which was also used until 1997, as in the Soviet Army since 1974. Between 1997 and 2013, the rank insignia was four stars in a row, as in the Soviet Union from 1943 to 1974.

Until 1997 generals wore a "small" marshal's star. But when, in 1993, the ranks of chief marshal and marshal of the branch in Russian Federation were abolished, there was no more reason for a special rank insignia for generals. By the President's decree of January 27, 1997, generals regained 1943-like straps with four stars in a row.

Service uniform shoulder boards 1994–1997

Ground Forces and RVSN

Air Force (VVS)

VDV and Space Forces (KV)

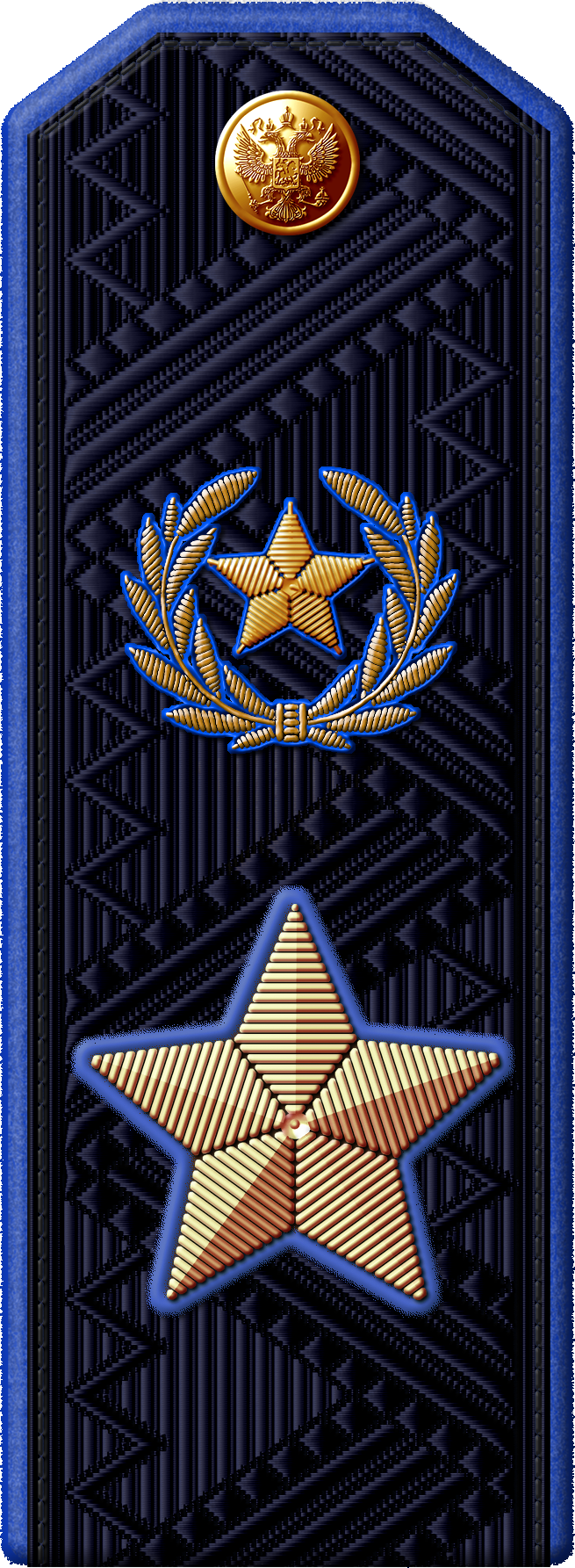
FSB
Service uniform shoulder boards 1997–2010

Ground Forces and RVSN

VVS

VDV and KV
Service uniform shoulder boards 2010–2013

Ground Forces and RVSN

VVS

VDV and KV

== List of army generals ==
Name	Lifespan	date of appointment	post at time of appointment	left military service
Pavel Grachev	1948–2012	7 May 1992	1st Deputy Minister of Defence	2007
Viktor Barannikov	1940–1995	7 May 1992	Minister of Security	1993
Viktor Dubynin	1943–1992	5 October 1992	Chief of the General Staff	died in service 1992
Viktor Yerin	1944–2018	1 October 1993	Minister of Internal Affairs	2000
Mikhail Kolesnikov	1939–2007	5 May 1995	Chief of the General Staff	2004
Mikhail Barsukov	born 1947	9 November 1995	Director of the Federal Security Service (FSB)	1997
Anatoly Kulikov	born 1946	9 November 1995	Minister of Internal Affairs	1998
Ramzan Kadyrov	born 1976	5 October 2026	Head of the Chechen Republic	in service
Andrei Nikolayev	born 1949	17 November 1995	Director of the Federal Border Service	1998
Viktor Samsonov	1941–2024	25 January 1996	Chief of Staff, Military Cooperation Headquarters, Commonwealth of Independent States	1999
Vladimir Toporov	born 1946	22 February 1996	Deputy Minister of Defence	2002
Pyotr Deynekin	1937–2017	13 June 1996	Commander-in-Chief of the Russian Air Force	1998
Viktor Prudnikov	1939–2015	13 June 1996	Commander of the Air Defence Forces	2004
Vladimir Semyonov	born 1940	13 June 1996	Commander-in-Chief of the Ground Forces	2004
Igor Sergeyev	1938–2006	13 June 1996	Commander of the Strategic Rocket Forces	2001
Igor Rodionov	1936–2014	4 October 1996	Minister of Defence	1996
Anatoly Kvashnin	1946-2022	25 November 1997	Chief of the General Staff	2004
Vyacheslav Trubnikov	1944-2022	22 January 1998	Director of the Foreign Intelligence Service (SVR)	2000
Nikolay Kovalyov	1949–2019	23 February 1998	Director of the FSB	1998
Aleksandr Starovoitov	1940–2021	23 February 1998	Director of the FAPSI	1999
Viktor Kazantsev	1946–2021	21 February 2000	Commander of the North Caucasus Military District	2000
Anatoly Kornukov	1942–2014	21 February 2000	Commander of the Air Force	2002
Vladimir Yakovlev	born 1954	27 June 2000	Commander of the Strategic Rocket Forces	2004
Nikolai Patrushev	born 1951	11 June 2001	Director of the FSB	2008
Vladimir Isakov	born 1950	22 February 2002	Commander of the Rear of the Russian Armed Forces	2008
Aleksandr Kosovan	born 1941	22 February 2002	Deputy Minister of Defence	2003
Vyacheslav Tikhomirov	1945–2014	6 November 2002	Commander of the Internal Troops	2004
Valentin Bobryshev	1945–2022	21 February 2003	Commander of the Leningrad Military District	2005
Yury Yakubov	born 1946	21 February 2003	Commander of the Far Eastern Military District	2006
Konstantin Totsky	1950–2018	23 February 2003	Director of the Federal Border Service	2003
Vladimir Matyukhin	1945–2026	11 March 2003	Director of the FAPSI	2004
Sergey Shoygu	born 1955	7 May 2003	Minister of Emergency Situations	in service
Nikolay Abroskin	born 1951	11 June 2003	Chief of the Federal Special Construction Service	2010
Valentin Korabelnikov	born 1946	11 June 2003	Head of the Main Directorate of the General Staff (GRU)	2009
Nikolai Kormiltsev	born 1946	11 June 2003	Commander of the Ground Forces	2004
Vladimir Boldyrev	born 1949	12 December 2003	Commander of the North Caucasus Military District	2010
Sergey Lebedev	born 1948	2003	Director of the Foreign Intelligence Service	2007
Ivan Yefremov	born 1946	22 February 2004	Commander of the Moscow Military District	2007
Vladimir Mikhaylov	born 1943	22 February 2004	Commander of the Air Force	2007
Aleksandr Baranov	1946-2025	12 June 2004	Commander of the Volga-Urals Military District	2008
Alexey Moskovsky	born 1947	12 June 2004	Deputy Minister of Defence	2007
Nikolay Pankov	born 1954	12 June 2004	Head of Personnel at the Ministry of Defence	2009
Yevgeny Murov	born 1945	2004	Director of the Federal Protective Service	2010
Yuri Baluyevsky	born 1947	22 February 2005	Chief of the General Staff	2008
Nikolay Makarov	born 1952	8 May 2005	Commander of the Siberian Military District	2012
Vladimir Pronichev	born 1953	9 May 2005	Director of the Federal Border Service	2013
Igor Puzanov	1947–2023	12 December 2005	Commander of the Leningrad Military District	2007
Sergei Smirnov	born 1950	December 2005	1st Deputy Director of the FSB	2020
Rashid Nurgaliyev	born 1956	27 December 2005	Minister of Internal Affairs	2012
Anatoly Grebenyuk	born 1955	12 June 2006	Head of the Billeting and Arrangement Service of the Ministry of Defence	2007
Aleksandr Belousov	born 1952	15 December 2006	1st Deputy Minister of Defence	2009
Alexey Maslov	1953–2022	15 December 2006	Commander of the Ground Forces	2011
Alexander Bortnikov	born 1951	December 2006	Head of the Economic Security Department of the FSB	in service
Oleg Syromolotov	born 1953	December 2006	Head of the Counter-intelligence Department of the FSB	2015
Vladimir Bakin	born 1953	23 February 2007	Commander of the Moscow Military District	2009
Nikolay Rogozhkin	born 1952	23 February 2007	Commander of the Internal Troops	2014
Vladimir Popovkin	1957–2014	22 February 2009	Chief of Armaments of the Ministry of Defence	2011
Nikolai Klimashin	born 1952	?	Head of the Scientific and Technical Service of the FSB	2010
Dmitry Bulgakov	born 1954	23 February 2011	Deputy Minister of Defence	2022
Valery Gerasimov	born 1955	21 February 2013	Chief of the General Staff	in service
Arkady Bakhin	born 1956	21 February 2013	1st Deputy Minister of Defence	2015
Yuri Yakovlev	born 1952	?	Head of the Economic Security Department of the FSB	2016
Vladimir Kulishov	born 1957	?	1st Deputy Director of the FSB	in service
Viktor Zolotov	born 1954	10 November 2015	Commander of the Internal Troops	in service
Pavel Popov	born 1957	11 December 2015	Deputy Minister of Defence	2024
Oleg Salyukov	born 1955	22 February 2019	Commander of the Ground Forces	2025
Aleksandr Dvornikov	born 1961	23 June 2020	Commander of the Southern Military District	in service
Yevgeny Zinichev	1966–2021	21 December 2020	Minister of Emergency Situations	died in service 2021
Dmitry Kochnev	born 1964	2020	Director of the Federal Protective Service	in service
Sergei Korolev	born 1962	2021	1st Deputy Director of the FSB	in service
Sergey Surovikin	born 1966	16 August 2021	Commander-in-Chief of the Aerospace Forces	in service
Viktor Goremykin	born 1959	9 December 2024	Deputy Minister of Defence, Head of the Main Military-Political Directorate of the Russian Armed Forces	in service
Yunus-bek Yevkurov	born 1963	9 December 2024	Deputy Minister of Defence	in service

== See also ==
- Army ranks and insignia of the Russian Federation
- Aerospace Forces ranks and insignia of the Russian Federation
