= Pavel Grachev =

Soviet general (1948–2012)

- Павел Грачёв
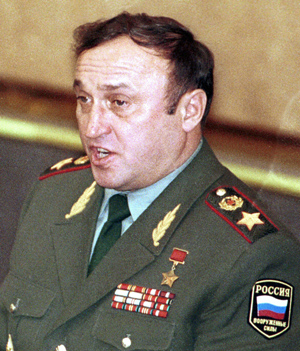
- Grachev in 1994

2nd Minister of Defence
- In office 18 May 1992 – 17 July 1996
- President: Boris Yeltsin
- Prime Minister: Boris Yeltsin; Yegor Gaidar (acting); Viktor Chernomyrdin
- Preceded by: Boris Yeltsin (acting)
- Succeeded by: Mikhail Kolesnikov (acting)

Personal details
- Born: 1 January 1948 Rvy, Tula Oblast, RSFSR, USSR
- Died: 23 September 2012 (aged 64) Krasnogorsk, Moscow Oblast, Russia
- Party: CPSU (1969–91)
- Awards: Hero of the Soviet Union

Military service
- Allegiance: Soviet Union (to 1991); Russia
- Branch/service: Soviet Airborne Forces; Russian Airborne Forces
- Years of service: 1965–1996
- Rank: General of the Army
- Commands: Soviet Airborne Forces; Ministry of Defense of the Russian Federation
- Battles/wars: Soviet–Afghan War; First Chechen War

Pavel Sergeyevich Grachev (Russian: Па́вел Серге́евич Грачёв; 1 January 1948 – 23 September 2012), sometimes transliterated as Grachov or Grachyov, was a Russian Army General and the Defence Minister of the Russian Federation from 1992 to 1996; in 1988 he was awarded Hero of the Soviet Union gold star.

As Defence Minister, Grachev gained notoriety because of his military incompetence displayed during the First Chechen War and the persistent allegations of involvement in enormous corruption scandals.

== Life and career ==
=== In the Soviet Union ===
Grachev, born in 1948 in Tula Oblast, RSFSR, joined the Soviet Army's airborne troops in 1965 and finished the Ryazan Guards Higher Airborne Command School. In 1972, he joined the Soviet Communist Party. After commanding parachute platoons, companies and battalions in the 1970s, he attended the Frunze Military Academy and the General Staff Academy, graduating in 1981. During the Soviet–Afghan War, Grachev commanded the 345th Independent Guards Airborne Regiment from 1982 to 1983, and was in command of the 103rd Guards Airborne Division in Afghanistan in the last years of the Soviet involvement from 1985 to 1988.

In December 1990, he was appointed commander of the Soviet airborne troops. In August/December 1991, Grachev became the Soviet Union's First Deputy Minister of Defence during its break-up.

=== In the Russian Federation ===
For a period of time, in the early-to-mid-1990s, Grachev was a close friend of the President of Russia Boris Yeltsin, and held the post of the Minister of Defence of the Russian Federation from May 1992 to June 1996. Grachev took part in the 1991 Soviet coup attempt and the events of the 1993 Russian constitutional crisis, during which he supported Yeltsin. In November 1994 Yeltsin called Grachev "the best defense minister of the decade."

Grachev was involved in the case of corruption in the Western Group of Forces in 1993–94. Accusations were repeatedly made against Grachev in the Russian media in the illegal acquisition of imported Mercedes cars, which were issued with the help of the command of the Western Group of Forces. None of these accusations was disputed by Grachev in court, but he was also not held accountable.

In late 1994 through 1996, Grachev played a key role in initiating and leading the First Chechen War. He was one of authors of the idea to use force to "restore constitutional order" in the breakaway republic of Chechnya and publicly promised to swiftly crush the Chechen separatist forces "in a couple of hours with a single airborne regiment." He was rumoured to have launched the disastrous storming of Grozny while drunk during the celebrations of his 1 January birthday. As TIME commented in 1995: "Grachev had remarked recently that only an 'incompetent commander' would order tanks into the streets of central Grozny, where they would be vulnerable (...) Yet at the end of December he did it." Eventually, in July 1996, following his re-election, Yeltsin sacked the disgraced Grachev. The First Chechen War soon ended with more than 100,000 soldiers and civilians having lost their lives.

Grachev was suspected of being involved in the murder of Dmitry Kholodov, a Moskovsky Komsomolets journalist, in October 1994. At a criminal trial in a military court, where the defendants were officers of the 45th Guards Spetsnaz Brigade, in 2001 the ex-minister was forced to testify as a witness. The process ended with the acquittal of all defendants, the crime remained unsolved.

In December 1997, Grachev was appointed a senior military adviser to Rosvooruzhenie State Corporation, the Russian arms export monopoly. On 25 April 2007, Grachev was fired from this position.

Grachev died on 23 September 2012 of acute meningoencephalitis, in the Vishnevsky Military Hospital in Krasnogorsk. He was 64.

== Popular culture ==
The archival footage of Grachev saying "tank regiments are commanded by total idiots; you send in the infantry first, then the tanks" is shown on TV in the 2002 film House of Fools.

Political offices
Preceded by Boris Yeltsin (acting)	Defence Minister of the Russian Federation; 1992–1996	Succeeded by Mikhail Kolesnikov (acting)
Military offices
Preceded by Vladislav Achalov	Commander of the Soviet Airborne Forces; 1990–1991	Succeeded by Yevgeny Podkolzin
