= Ruslan Tsalikov =

Russian military officer (born 1956)

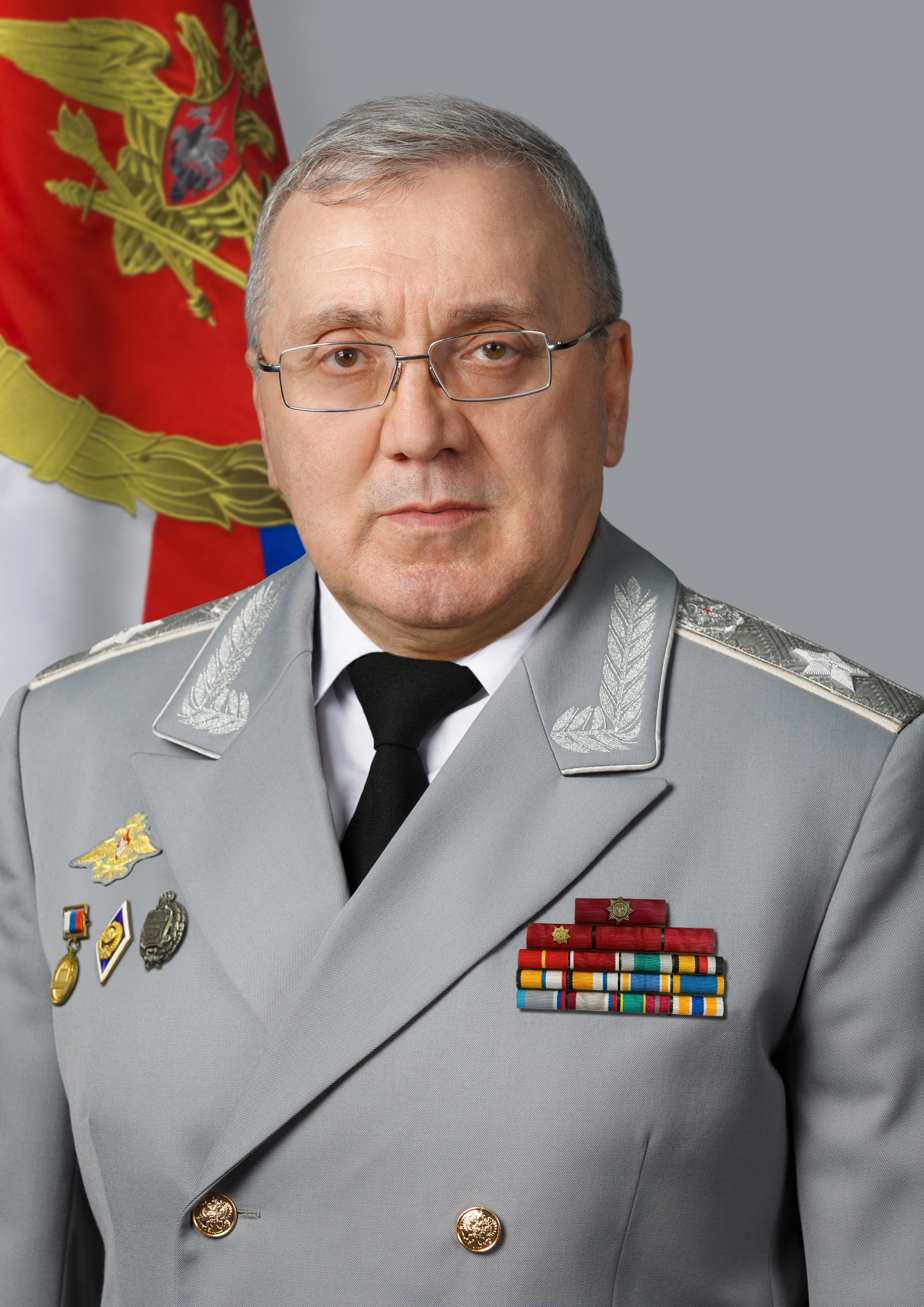
- Official portrait, 2016

Member of the Supreme Khural of the Republic of Tuva
- In office 26 September 2024 – 20 March 2026
- Constituency: Republic of Tuva

First Deputy Minister of Defence
- In office 24 December 2015 – 17 June 2024
- Prime Minister: Dmitry Medvedev; Mikhail Mishustin
- Minister: Sergei Shoigu; Andrei Belousov
- Preceded by: Arkady Bakhin
- Succeeded by: Leonid Gornin

Deputy Minister of Defence
- In office 15 November 2012 – 24 December 2015
- Prime Minister: Dmitry Medvedev
- Minister: Sergei Shoigu

Acting Governor of Moscow Oblast
- In office 6 November 2012 – 8 November 2012
- Preceded by: Sergei Shoigu
- Succeeded by: Andrey Vorobyov (Acting)

Vice-Governor of the Moscow Oblast
- In office 17 May 2012 – 15 November 2012
- Governor: Sergei Shoigu; Andrey Vorobyov (Acting)

Acting Minister of Emergency Situations
- In office 11 May 2012 – 17 May 2012
- President: Vladimir Putin
- Preceded by: Sergei Shoigu
- Succeeded by: Vladimir Puchkov

First Deputy Minister of Emergency Situations
- In office 14 June 2007 – 30 May 2012
- President: Vladimir Putin; Dmitry Medvedev

Personal details
- Born: July 31, 1956 (age 70) Ordzhonikidze (now Vladikavkaz), North Ossetian ASSR
- Party: United Russia
- Awards: Order of Honour; Order of Friendship

Military service
- Allegiance: Soviet Union; Russia
- Branch/service: Armed Forces of the Russian Federation
- Years of service: 1991–2024
- Rank: 1st class Active State Councillor of the Russian Federation

Ruslan Khadzhismelovich Tsalikov (Russian: Руслан Хаджисмелович Цаликов; born 31 July 1956) is a Russian politician.

Member of the Supreme Khural of the Republic of Tuva (2024-2026). First Deputy Minister of Defence Russia (2015-2024).

Full Cavalier of the Order "For Merit to the Fatherland". He has the federal state civilian service rank of 1st class Active State Councillor of the Russian Federation.

On 19 November 2026 he was convicted to 10 years of colony, and stripped of state awards.

== Biography ==
Tsalikov was born on July 31, 1956, in Ordzhonikidze (now Vladikavkaz), North Ossetian ASSR. He graduated from the North Ossetian State University which was named in honour of Kosta Khetagurov in 1978 and five years later got a degree from the Moscow Institute of National Economy. Between those years he was an intern researcher in the same place.

From 1983 to 1987 Tsalikov was a lecturer on labour economics and the same year became a subdean of the Economics Faculty at the same university.

From 1987 to 1989, he was Economic Affairs' General Director, and from 1989 to 1990, worked at Control-and-Auditing Directorate as the Chief Controller.

Tsalikov worked as Minister of Finance of North Ossetia for four years starting from 1990 and from 1994 till 2000 was the Chief of the Main Financial and Economic Administration under Boris Yeltsin.

From 2000 to 2005, he worked for Ministry of Emergency Situations. He was promoted to the State Secretary by Vladimir Putin, a position which he held from 2005 to 2007.

In 2010, he became a head of Ministry of Emergency Situations and then was invited as a guest on Special Correspondent on Russia-1.

From May to November 2012, he was the Vice Governor of the Moscow Region. He was made Acting Governor of Moscow Region on 6 November 2012 and served until 8 November 2012, when he was replaced by current Governor Andrei Vorobyov.

In November 2012 under Presidential Decree in the Serdyukov-Shoigu shakeup, he was promoted to Deputy Minister of Defence of the Russian Federation. He was scheduled to become Acting Governor of Moscow Region.

In January 2017 Tsalikov visited Armenia where he described it as Russia’s key regional ally.

In August 2022 Tsalikov was rumoured by Alexei Navalny to have distributed no less than $80 million to his children and other close relatives.

In June 2024 Tsalikov was dismissed by Putin along with three others from the Ministry of Defence (Nikolai Pankov, Tatiana Shevtsova and Pavel Popovin) in a shakeup marred by rumours of corruption. Another report had mention of his "sudden resignation" in the immediate aftermath of the May 2024 Shoigu-Belousov ministerial transition. He was linked along with Shoigu to Timur Ivanov, an underling who provided the accounting firepower that the two senior men lacked, and who was arrested just prior to the May 2024 shakeup.

In March 2026, Tsalikov was arrested on charges of corruption. On 19 November 2026 he was convicted to 10 years of colony, and stripped of state awards. His and his family's assets of 5.5 billion rubles we turned to state.

=== Sanctions ===
Tsalikov was sanctioned by the UK government in 2022 in relation to the Russo-Ukrainian War.
