= Viktor Goremykin =

Russian military officer (born 1959)

General of the Army Viktor Goremykin
- Виктор Петрович Горемыкин
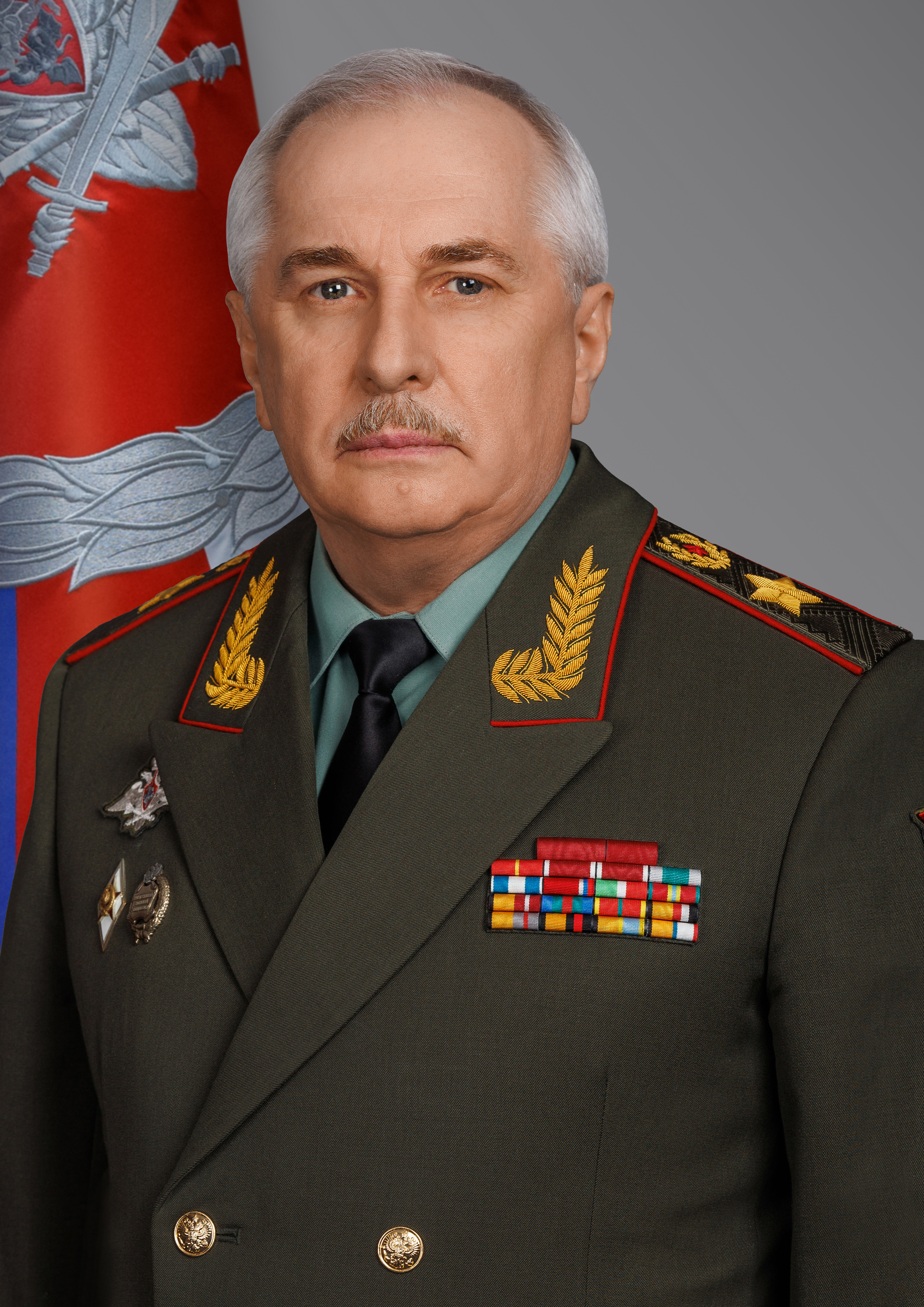
- Official portrait, 2024

Deputy Minister of Defense of Russia and Director of the Main Military-Political Directorate
- Incumbent
- Assumed office 28 July 2022
- Preceded by: Gennady Zhidko

Personal details
- Born: 4 February 1959 (age 67) Kormovoye, Serebryano-Prudsky District, Soviet Union
- Education: Chelyabinsk Higher Tank Command School; FSB Academy; Russian Academy for State Service
- Profession: Military officer
- Awards: Order "For Merit to the Fatherland", Order of Alexander Nevsky, Order of Courage, Order of Friendship, Jubilee Medal "300 Years of the Russian Navy", Medal "In Commemoration of the 850th Anniversary of Moscow", Medal "In Commemoration of the 1000th Anniversary of Kazan", Jubilee Medal "70 Years of the Armed Forces of the USSR", Medal "For the Return of Crimea", Medal "Participant of the military operation in Syria", Awards of the Ministry of Defense, Medal "For Impeccable Service", Medal "For Impeccable Service", Honoured Military Specialist Russia

Military service
- Rank: Army General

Viktor Petrovich Goremykin (Russian: Виктор Петрович Горемыкин; born 4 February 1959 in Moscow Oblast) is a Russian military officer who serves as Deputy Minister of Defense of the Russian Federation and Chief of the Main Military-Political Directorate of the Russian Armed Forces since July 28, 2022. He holds the rank of Army General (2024) and holds the title Honored military specialist of the Russian Federation.

== Biography ==
Born February 4, 1959, in the village of Kormovoye (Serebryano-Prudsky District, Moscow Oblast).

In 1980, he graduated from the Chelyabinsk Higher Tank Command School. After graduating from the school, he served in the Soviet Armed Forces, then in the Russian Armed Forces.

In 1994, he graduated from the FSB Academy, and in 2001 from the Russian Academy of Public Administration under the President of the Russian Federation.

Since 2000, he served in the Main Directorate of Personnel of the Ministry of Defense of the Russian Federation.

In April 2009, he was appointed to the post of Chief of the Main Directorate of Personnel of the Ministry of Defense of the Russian Federation.

He is a member of the editorial board of the journal "Military Thought".

By Decree of the President of Russia of August 31, 2012 No. 1240, he was awarded the military rank of Colonel General.

On July 28, 2022, he was appointed Deputy Minister of Defense of the Russian Federation and Chief of the Main Military-Political Directorate of the Russian Armed Forces.

By Decree of the President of Russia of December 9, 2024 No. 1060, he was awarded the military rank of Army General.

Due to Russia's invasion of Ukraine, he is under international sanctions from all EU countries, Japan and Switzerland.
