= Alexey Krivoruchko =

Russian businessman and politician

- Алексей Юрьевич Криворучко
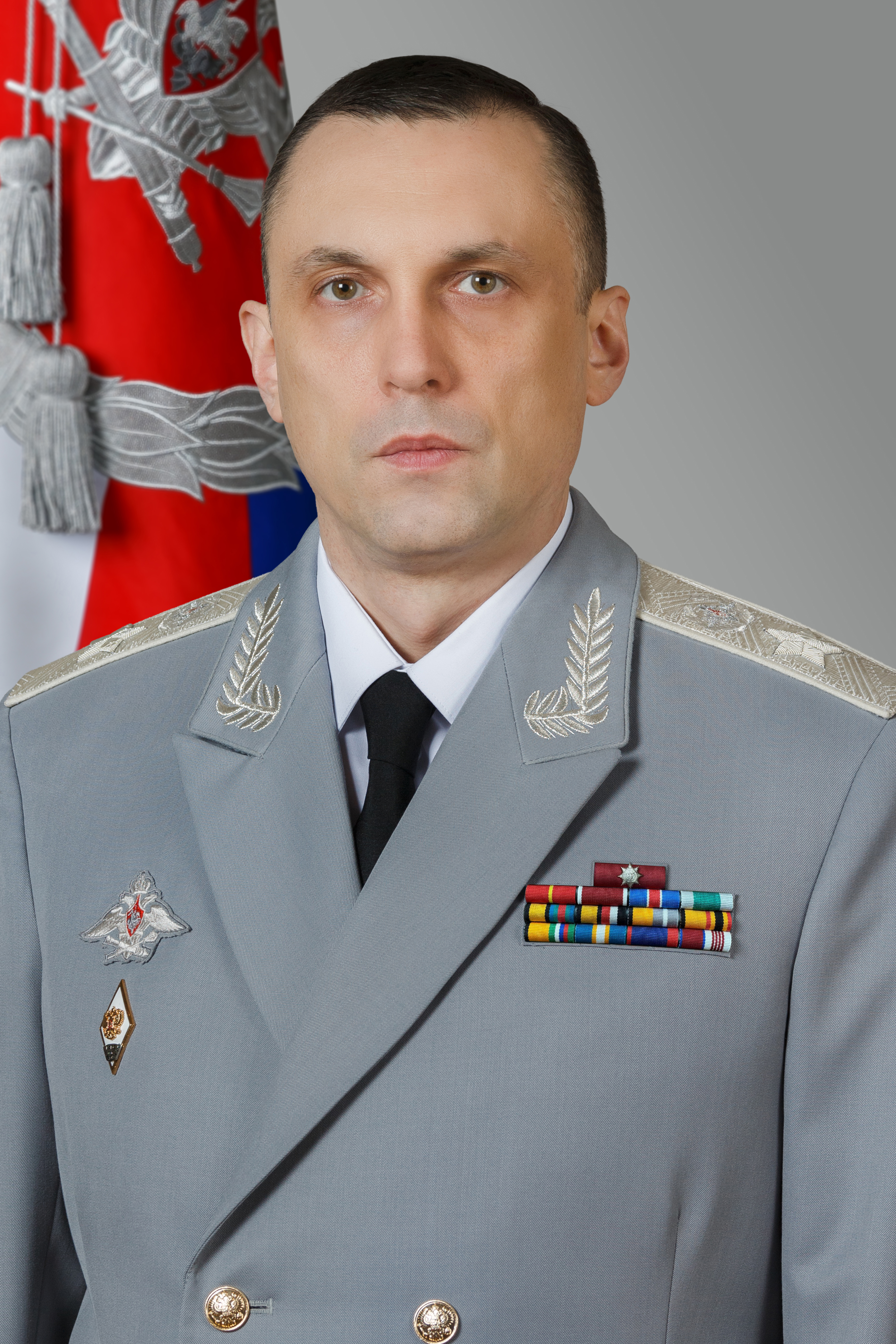
- Official portrait, 2018

Deputy Minister of Defense of Russia
- Incumbent
- Assumed office 13 June 2018

Personal details
- Born: 17 July 1975 (age 51) Stavropol, Soviet Union
- Spouse: Ekaterina Toropova
- Children: 3 (i.a. daughters Sophia and Anna)
- Education: State University of Management; Russian Academy for State Service
- Profession: Economist, politician
- Awards: Order "For Merit to the Fatherland", Order of Alexander Nevsky, Order of Military Merit, Order of Friendship, Medal "Participant of the military operation in Syria", Russian Ministry of Defense Awards, Russian Ministerial Awards,

Military service
- Rank: 1st class Active State Councillor of the Russian Federation

Alexey Yuryevich Krivoruchko (Russian: Алексей Юрьевич Криворучко; born July 17, 1975, Stavropol, RSFSR, USSR) is a Russian statesman, Deputy Minister of Defense of the Russian Federation responsible for military-technical provision (armament, special and military hardware) since June 13, 2018. Active 1st class Active State Councillor of the Russian Federation (2021).

== Biography ==
Born July 17, 1975, in Stavropol.

Graduated from the Institute of Management, Economics, Law and Informatics (2005), the Russian Academy of Public Administration under the President of the Russian Federation (2010) and the Military Academy of the General Staff of the Russian Armed Forces.

From 1999 to 2001, he worked as Deputy General Director, General Director of Rostov Civil Aviation Plant No. 412. From 2004 to 2005 - Advisor to the Deputy General Director for Logistics at Aeroflot.

In 2006, he worked as a chief expert, consultant of the department of regional and offset programs at Rosoboronexport. From 2006 to 2009, he held a number of positions at AvtoVAZ: Deputy General Director for Sales and Technical Services, executive director for Sales, Vice President for Sales and Marketing, Senior Vice President for Sales and Marketing.

From 2010 to 2018, he held the position of General Director of Aeroexpress.

From 2014 to 2018, he held the position of General Director of Kalashnikov Concern.

By the Decree of the President of Russia dated June 13, 2018, he was appointed Deputy Minister of Defense of the Russian Federation overseeing issues of organizing military-technical support for the Armed Forces, planning the development of weapons, military and special equipment, monitoring the implementation of state defense orders, organizing patent-licensing, invention and rationalization work in the Armed Forces.

He is a member of the Board of Directors of the United Shipbuilding Corporation, Promsvyazbank, and Tactical Missiles Corporation.

In 2019, he was included in the Forbes rating of the richest security officials in Russia (second place). His income for 2018 was 119.2 million rubles.

He owns elite real estate on Rublyovka (a 1,500 m^{2} mansion and a 35-acre plot of land), and in 2011 he established a company in Miami (USA) called 5256 Fisher Island Drive.

Laureate of the Person of the Year award in 2011 for his contribution to the development of transport infrastructure.
