= Minister of Defence (Russia) =

Russian government minister

Minister of Defence of the Russian Federation
- Министр обороны Российской Федерации
- Emblem of the Minister of Defence

- Ensign of the Minister of Defence

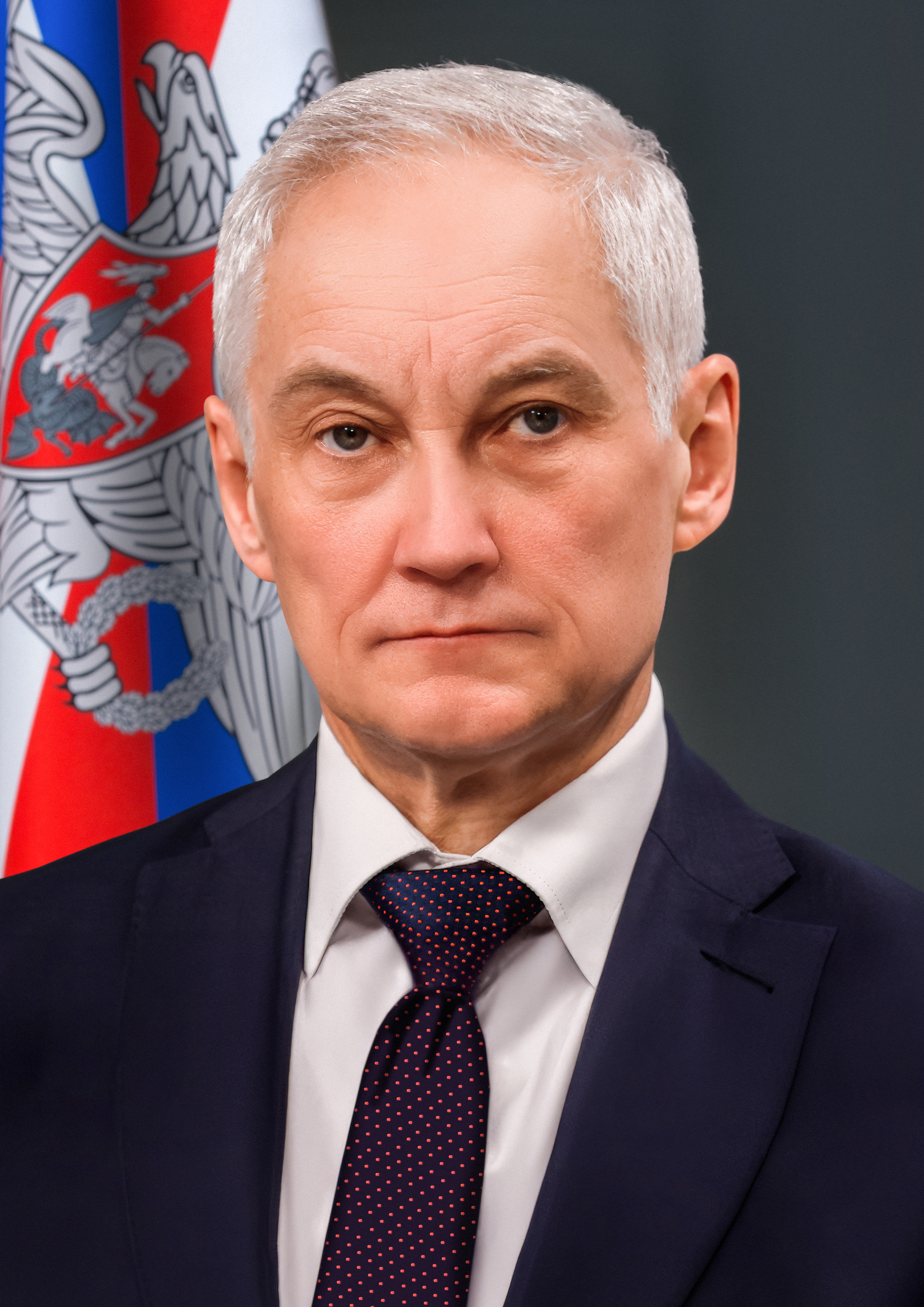
- Incumbent; Andrey Belousov since 14 May 2024
- Ministry of Defence
- Member of: Government; Security Council; CIS Defence Ministers Council
- Reports to: President
- Seat: Defence Ministry Building, Moscow
- Appointer: President after consultation with Federation Council
- Precursor: Minister of Defence (Soviet Union)
- Formation: 20 August 1991
- First holder: Konstantin Kobets
- Deputy: First Deputy Minister of Defence
- Website: structure.mil.ru/minister.htm

The Minister of Defence of the Russian Federation (Russian: Министр обороны Российской Федерации) is the minister responsible for the Russian Armed Forces. Marshal of Aviation Yevgeny Shaposhnikov was the last minister of defence of the Soviet Union. General Colonel Konstantin Kobets supported then President of the Russian Soviet Federative Socialist Republic Boris Yeltsin during the August coup of 1991. From 19 August until 9 September 1991, Konstantin Kobets was defence minister of the RSFSR, though there was no ministry. This post was then abolished.

The first minister of defence of the Russian Federation was Boris Yeltsin, who appointed himself to the position by a decree of mid March 1992.

In May 1992, President of Russia Boris Yeltsin appointed General of the Army Pavel Grachev to the post of minister of defence. Grachev's decision to side with Yeltsin in the Russian constitutional crisis of 1993, when the president called up tanks to shell the Russian White House to blast his opponents out of parliament, effectively deprived the Supreme Soviet of Russia of its nominal an opportunity to overturn the president's authority. At least partly for that reason, Yeltsin retained his defence minister despite intense criticism of Grachev's management of the First Chechen War and the Russian military establishment in general. Finally, Yeltsin's victory in the first round of the 1996 Russian presidential election spurred Yeltsin to dismiss Grachev.

In March 2001, Sergei Ivanov, previously secretary of the Security Council of Russia, was appointed defence minister by President Vladimir Putin, becoming Russia's first non-uniformed civilian defence minister. Putin called the personnel changes in Russia's security structures coinciding with Ivanov's appointment as defence minister "a step toward demilitarizing public life." Putin also stressed Ivanov's responsibility for overseeing military reform as defence minister. What Putin did not emphasise was Ivanov's long service within the KGB and FSB and his then rank of General-Lieutenant within the FSB. Such military and security agency associated men are known as siloviki.

As of 2002 there were four living Marshals of the Soviet Union. Such men were automatically advisors to the defence minister. The Marshals alive at that time were Viktor Kulikov, Vasily Petrov, Sergei Sokolov, a former minister of defence of the Soviet Union, and Dmitri Yazov. Yazov was listed by the American analysts Scott and Scott in 2002 as a consultant to the (former 10th) Directorate for International Military Cooperation. The last of the four, Yazov, died in February 2020.

Perhaps the first 'real' non-uniformed defence minister was Anatoliy Serdyukov, appointed in February 2007. Serdyukov was a former Tax Minister with little siloviki or military associations beyond his two years' military service.

== List of ministers of defence ==
Denotes acting Minister of Defence

No.	Portrait	Name (born-died)	Term of office			Political party	Defence branch	Government
No.	Portrait	Name (born-died)	Took office	Left office	Time in office	Political party	Defence branch	Government
1	Konstantin Kobets	General of the Army; Konstantin Kobets (1939–2012)	20 August 1991	9 September 1991	20 days	CPSU	Russian Ground Forces	Silaev II
Between 9 September 1991 and 7 May 1992 the Russian Federation de jure did not have its own minister of defence. During this period its armed forces were under control of Minister of Defence of the Soviet Union Yevgeny Shaposhnikov.
–	Boris Yeltsin	Colonel; Boris Yeltsin (1931–2007); Acting	16 March 1992	18 May 1992	63 days	Independent	None	Yeltsin & Gaidar
2	Pavel Grachev	General of the Army; Pavel Grachev (1948–2012)	18 May 1992	18 June 1996	4 years, 31 days	Independent	Russian Airborne Forces	Yeltsin & Gaidar; Chernomyrdin I
–	Mikhail Kolesnikov	General of the Army; Mikhail Kolesnikov (1939–2007); Acting	18 June 1996	17 July 1996	29 days	Independent	Russian Ground Forces	Chernomyrdin I
3	Igor Rodionov	General of the Army in reserve Igor Rodionov (1936–2014)	17 July 1996	22 May 1997	309 days	Independent	Russian Ground Forces	Chernomyrdin I–II
4	Igor Sergeyev	Marshal of the Russian Federation; Igor Sergeyev (1938–2006)	22 May 1997	28 March 2001	3 years, 310 days	Independent	Strategic Rocket Forces	Chernomyrdin II; Kiriyenko; Primakov; Stepashin; Putin I Kasyanov
5	Sergei Ivanov	Colonel general in reserve Sergei Ivanov (1953–2026)	28 March 2001	15 February 2007	5 years, 324 days	United Russia	Foreign Intelligence Service; Federal Security Service	Kasyanov; Fradkov I–II
6	Anatoliy Serdyukov	Colonel in reserve Anatoliy Serdyukov (born 1962)	15 February 2007	6 November 2012	5 years, 265 days	United Russia	Russian Ground Forces	Fradkov II; Zubkov; Putin II; Medvedev I
7	Sergei Shoigu	General of the Army; Sergei Shoigu (born 1955)	6 November 2012	12 May 2024	11 years, 188 days	United Russia	Ministry of Emergency Situations	Medvedev I–II; Mishustin I
8	Andrey Belousov	Andrey Belousov (born 1959)	14 May 2024	Incumbent	2 years, 116 days	Independent	None	Mishustin II

=== Former first deputy ministers of defence ===
- Andrei Kokoshin (3 April 1992 – 25 January 1996); (25 January 1996 – 28 August 1997), State Secretary
- Pavel Grachyov (3 April 1992 – 18 May 1992)
- Viktor Dubynin (10 June 1992 – 22 November 1992), Chief of the General Staff of the Armed Forces
- Mikhail Kolesnikov (23 December 1992 – 18 October 1996), Chief of the General Staff of the Armed Forces
- Viktor Samsonov (18 October 1996 – 22 May 1997), Chief of the General Staff of the Armed Forces
- Anatoly Kvashnin (23 May 1997 – 19 June 1997), Acting Chief of the General Staff of the Armed Forces; (19 June 1997 – 19 July 2004), Chief of the General Staff of the Armed Forces
- Nikolai Mikhailov (11 September 1997 – 28 March 2000), State Secretary
- Vladimir Matyukhin (11 March 2003 – 21 May 2004)
- Yury Baluyevsky (19 July 2004 – 3 June 2008), Chief of the General Staff of the Armed Forces
- Aleksandr Belousov (19 July 2004 – 25 September 2007)
- Alexander Kolmakov (25 September 2007 – 21 June 2010)
- Nikolai Makarov (3 June 2008 – 9 November 2012), Chief of the General Staff of the Armed Forces
- Vladimir Popovkin (21 June 2010 – 29 April 2011)
- Aleksandr Sukhorukov (1 September 2011 – 9 November 2012)
- Arkady Bakhin (9 November 2012 – 17 November 2015)
- Ruslan Tsalikov (24 December 2015 – 29 May 2024)

=== Former deputy ministers of defence ===
- Georgy Kondratyev (10 June 1992 – 9 February 1995)
- Valery Mironov (10 June 1992 – 9 February 1995)
- Vladimir Toporov (10 June 1992 – 28 March 2001)
- Boris Gromov (24 June 1992 – 16 March 1995)
- Yevgeny Vysotsky (19 August 1992 – October 1996), Chief of the Main Directorate of Personnel
- Konstantin Kobets (?? June 1993 – 18 May 1997), Chief Military Inspector of the Armed Forces of the Russian Federation
- Matvey Burlakov (23 August 1994 – 9 February 1995)
- Anatoly Solomatin (9 February 1995 – ?? April 1997), Chief of Construction and Quartering of Troops
- Vladimir Churanov (17 January 1995 – 16 June 1997), Chief of Logistics of the Armed Forces of the Russian Federation
- Aleksandr Kosovan (?? April 1997 – 6 March 2003), Chief of Construction and Quartering of Troops
- Vladimir Isakov (30 June 1997 – 2 December 2008), Chief of Logistics of the Armed Forces of the Russian Federation
- Mikhail Dmitriyev (13 November 2000 – 8 April 2004)
- Aleksei Moskovsky (28 March 2001 – 19 April 2007), Chief of Armament of the Armed Forces of the Russian Federation
- Igor Puzanov (28 March 2001 – 18 October 2004), State Secretary
- Lyubov Kudelina (28 March 2001 – 18 October 2004), Chief of the Main Financial-Economic Administration of the Ministry of Defence of the Russian Federation and Deputy Minister of Defence of the Russian Federation for Financial-Economic Work; (1 September 2007 – 14 April 2009), Deputy Minister of Defence of the Russian Federation for Financial-Economic Work
- Nikolai Kormiltsev (28 April 2001 – 29 September 2004), Commander-in-chief of the Land Force
- Anatoly Grebenyuk (4 March 2003 – 18 October 2004), Chief of Construction and Quartering of Troops
- Nikolay Pankov (13 September 2005 — 17 June 2024)
- Nikolai Makarov (19 April 2007 – 3 June 2008), Chief of Armament of the Armed Forces of the Russian Federation
- Oleg Eskin (19 November 2007 – 20 November 2008)
- Vladimir Popovkin (?? July 2008 – 21 June 2010), Chief of Armament of the Armed Forces of the Russian Federation
- Vladimir Filippov (17 September 2008 – 12 January 2010), Chief of Quartering and Accommodation
- Dmitry Chushkin (20 November 2008 – 15 November 2012)
- Dmitry Bulgakov (2 December 2008 – 27 July 2010), Chief of Logistics of the Armed Forces of the Russian Federation
- Vera Chistova (14 April 2009 – 4 November 2010), Deputy Minister of Defence of the Russian Federation for Financial-Economic Work
- Grigory Naginsky (12 January 2010 – 6 July 2010), Chief of Quartering and Accommodation; (6 July 2010 – 22 April 2011)
- Mikhail Mokretsov (27 July 2010 – 5 July 2011), Chief of Staff of the Minister of Defence of the Russian Federation; (5 July 2011 – 10 December 2011)
- Tatiana Shevtsova (4 August 2010 — 17 June 2024)
- Yelena Kozlova (25 June 2012 – 15 November 2012)
- Oleg Ostapenko (9 November 2012 – 9 October 2013)
- Ruslan Tsalikov (15 November 2012 – 24 December 2015)
- Pavel Popov (7 November 2013 — 17 June 2024)
- Aleksei Dyumin (24 December 2015 – 2 February 2016)
- Anatoly Antonov (2 February 2011 – 29 December 2016)
- Yury Borisov (15 November 2012 – 18 May 2018)
- Yuriy Sadovenko (7 January 2013 – 20 May 2024)
- Timur Ivanov (11 November 2016 – 24 April 2024)
- Andrey Kartapolov (30 July 2018 — 5 October 2021), Head of the Main Military-Political Directorate of the Russian Armed Forces
- Gennady Zhidko (12 November 2021 — 28 July 2022), Head of the Main Military-Political Directorate of the Russian Armed Forces
- Mikhail Mizintsev (24 September 2022 – 27 April 2023)
- Alexey Kuzmenkov (30 April 2023 — 11 March 2024)

== See also ==
- Ministry of Defence (Russia)
