= Gennady Zhidko =

Russian colonel general (1965–2023)

- Геннадий Жидко
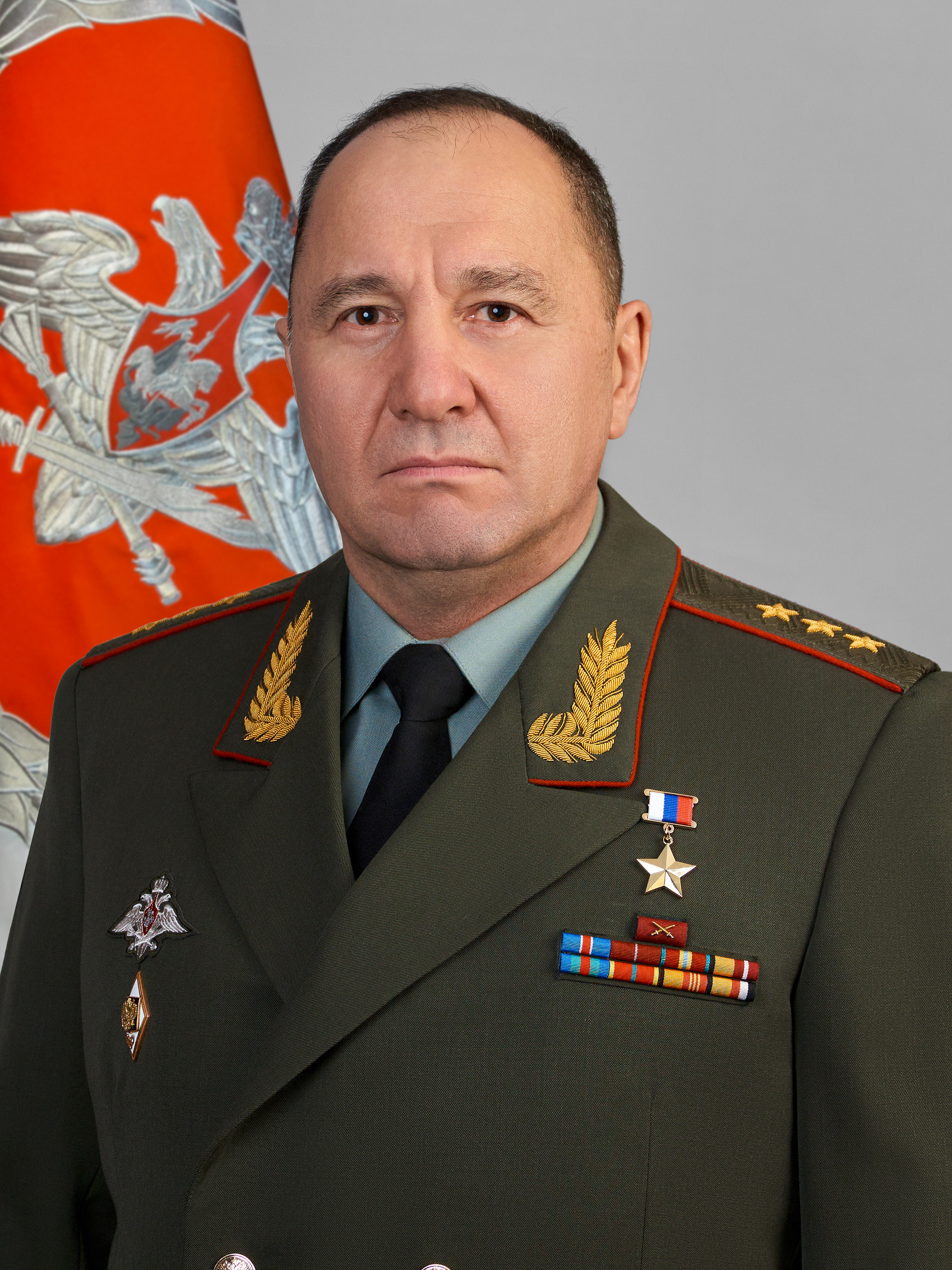
- Official portrait, 2021
- Born: Gennady Valeryevich Zhidko; 12 September 1965; Yangiobod, Uzbek SSR, Soviet Union
- Died: 16 August 2023 (aged 57); Moscow, Russia
- Military career
- Allegiance: Soviet Union; Russia
- Branch: Soviet Army; Russian Ground Forces
- Service years: 1988–2023
- Rank: Colonel general
- Commands: Eastern Military District; Deputy Minister of Defence
- Conflicts: Syrian civil war; Russo-Ukrainian war; Russian invasion of Ukraine
- Awards: Hero of the Russian Federation

Gennady Valeryevich Zhidko (Russian: Геннадий Валериевич Жидко; 12 September 1965 – 16 August 2023) was a colonel general of the Russian Armed Forces. He was awarded the title Hero of the Russian Federation in 2017 for his service as chief of staff of Russian forces deployed to Syria. Following this assignment, Zhidko commanded the Eastern Military District and headed the Main Military-Political Directorate of the Russian Armed Forces.

In late May 2022, it was reported that Zhidko had been put in charge of Russian forces during the Russian invasion of Ukraine, replacing Army General Aleksandr Dvornikov. However, this was never officially confirmed.

== Early life ==
Gennady Zhidko was born on 12 September 1965, in the village of Yangiobod in the Uzbek Soviet Socialist Republic.

Graduating from the Tashkent Higher Tank Command School in 1987, Zhidko became a platoon commander in the 27th Guards Motor Rifle Division. During Zhidko's service with the 27th Guards Motor Rifle Division, part of the Volga and Volga–Ural Military Districts at Totskoye, Orenburg Oblast, Zhidko rose to divizion (artillery battalion) commander, was promoted to captain early, and then to colonel. He received awards for organizing fire training from the commander of the Ural Military District, Colonel-General Alexander Baranov.

In 1997, Zhidko graduated from the Malinovsky Military Armored Forces Academy.

== Military career ==
Zhidko served as commander of the 92nd Motor Rifle Regiment of the 201st Motor Rifle Division in Dushanbe, Tajikistan by 2001. In 2007, he graduated from the Military Academy of the General Staff. From August 2007 to July 2009, he was commander of the 20th Guards Motor Rifle Division of the North Caucasian Military District, based in Volgograd. He oversaw the beginning of the transition of the division from conscripts to contract servicemen.

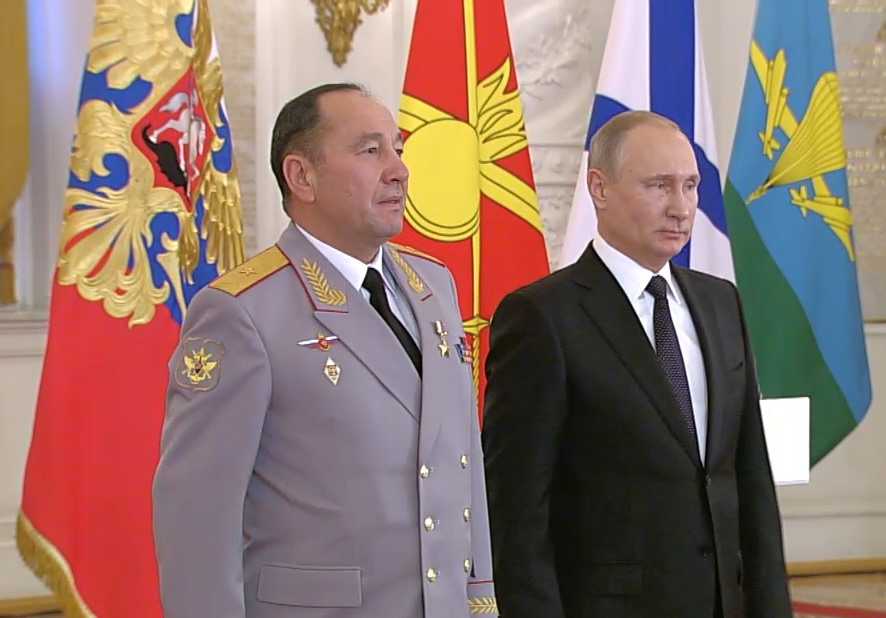
Zhidko with President Vladimir Putin in 2017

From July 2009 to January 2011, he was the Deputy Commander of the 20th Guards Combined Arms Army of the Moscow, then Western Military Districts with headquarters in Voronezh. From January 2011 to January 2012 – Chief of Staff – First Deputy Commander of the 6th Combined Arms Army of the Western Military District, based in Saint Petersburg. He participated in the formation of this unit, for his organizational skills he was noted by the commander of the 6th Army, Major General Yevgeny Ustinov, with the Commander of the Western Military District, Colonel-General Arkady Bakhin.

From January 2015 to September 2016, Zhidko was Chief of Staff – First Deputy Commander of the 2nd Guards Combined Arms Army, and from September 2016 to November 2017 – Commander of the 2nd Guards Combined Arms Army of the Central Military District with headquarters in Samara. During the Zapad-2017 military exercises, the army units were quickly deployed from Samara to the Kola Peninsula. On 20 February 2016, he was promoted to the rank of major general.

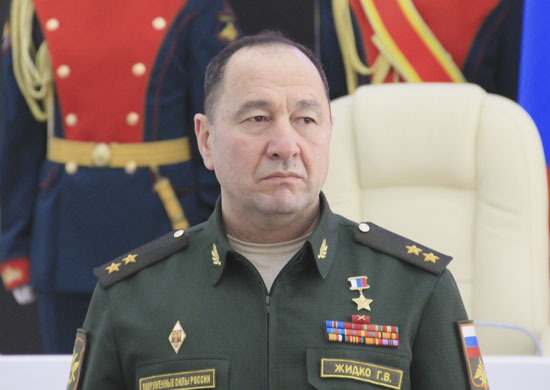
Zhidko in November 2018

In December 2017, Major General Rustam Muradov took over as commander of the 2nd Combined Arms Army. A participant in the Russian military intervention in Syria, in 2016, Zhidko served as chief of staff of the group of the Armed Forces of the Russian Federation in Syria. From 22 November 2017 to 3 November 2018, he was the Deputy Chief of the General Staff of the Russian Armed Forces. On 11 June 2018, he was promoted to the rank of lieutenant general.

In November 2018, Zhidko was appointed commander of the Eastern Military District, replacing Alexander Zhuravlyov, who had transferred to the post of commander of the Western Military District, on 13 November, he was presented to the leadership at the district headquarters in Khabarovsk. On 11 June 2020, Zhidko was promoted to colonel general.

On 12 November 2021, Zhidko was appointed head of the Main Military-Political Directorate of the Russian Armed Forces (GVPU), a position included among the deputy ministers of defence. Zhidko replaced Andrey Kartapolov, who had retired from the army. On 28 July 2022, Colonel General Viktor Goremykin replaced him as head of the GVPU.

=== 2022 invasion of Ukraine ===
On 26 May 2022, the Conflict Intelligence Team, citing Russian soldiers, reported that Zhidko had been put in charge of Russian forces during the Russian invasion of Ukraine, replacing Army General Aleksandr Dvornikov. On 22 June 2022, The Guardian reported that during a visit to Ukraine by Russian defence minister Sergei Shoigu, "footage appeared to confirm that the colonel general Gennady Zhidko is now commanding troops in Ukraine". However, neither Zhidko nor Dvornikov's appointment was ever officially confirmed, and in October 2022 Sergey Surovikin was publicly announced as overall commander.

According to reports in Kommersant, Zhidko was appointed Eastern District commander as early as July 2022, replacing Aleksandr Chaiko. According to the same source, Zhidko was then replaced in this role by Rustam Muradov in October 2022.

Zhidko was included under US sanctions in July 2022. He was also later sanctioned by Canada under the Special Economic Measures Act (S.C. 1992, c. 17) for Grave Breach of International Peace and Security and by the UK government on 15 March 2022, both in relation to the Russian invasion of Ukraine.

== Death ==
Zhidko died in Moscow on 16 August 2023, at the age of 57 after a long illness.

== See also ==
- List of Heroes of the Russian Federation
