= Leonid Gornin =

Russian politician (born 1972)

- Леонид Горнин
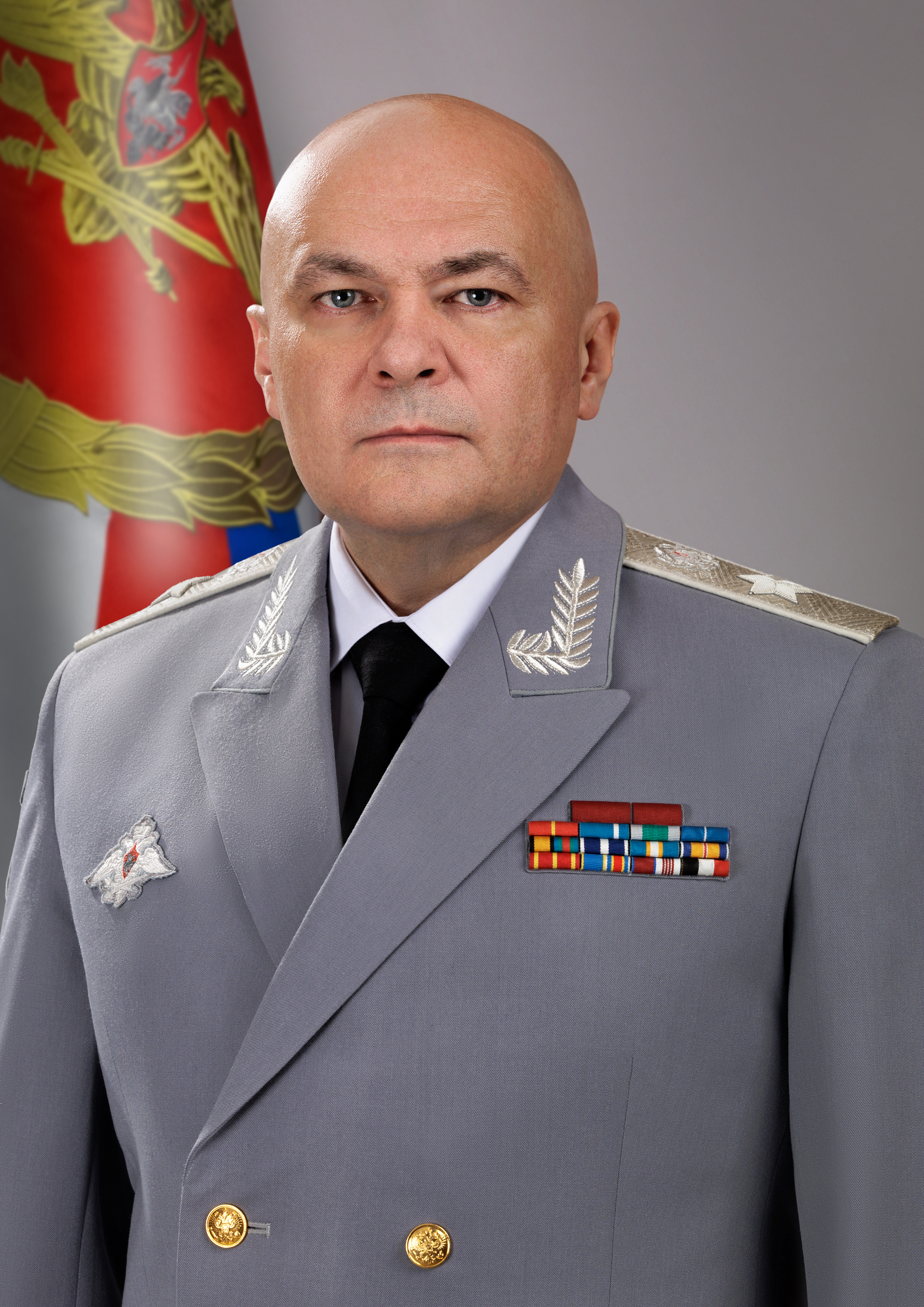
- Official portrait, 2024

First Deputy Minister of Defence
- Incumbent
- Assumed office 17 June 2024
- President: Vladimir Putin
- Prime Minister: Mikhail Mishustin
- Minister: Andrei Belousov
- Preceded by: Ruslan Tsalikov

Personal details
- Born: December 30, 1972 (age 53) Novosibirsk, Russian SFSR, USSR
- Awards: Order "For Merit to the Fatherland" Third and Fourth Class; Order of Alexander Nevsky; Order of Honour; Order of Friendship

Military service
- Allegiance: Soviet Union; Russia
- Branch/service: Armed Forces of the Russian Federation
- Rank: 1st class Active State Councillor of the Russian Federation

Leonid Vladmirovich Gornin (Russian: Леонид Владимирович Горнин; born 30 December 1972) is a Russian politician. He currently serves as First Deputy Minister of Defence. He has the federal state civilian service rank of 1st class Active State Councillor of the Russian Federation.

== Biography ==
Gornin was born on 30 December 1972 in Novosibirsk, in what was then the Russian Soviet Federative Socialist Republic, in the Soviet Union. He worked in various commercial enterprises for his early years, before graduating from the Siberian Commercial Academy of Consumer Cooperatives in 1997 with the speciality of "engineer-technologist". After his graduation he was appointed controller-auditor in the Office of the Control and Audit Department of the Ministry of Finance of Novosibirsk Oblast, becoming senior controller-auditor in 1998. Between 1999 and 2004 he rose through the positions of a deputy head of department, and then a head of department and chief accountant of the Finance and Tax Policy Department of the Administration of Novosibirsk Oblast. In 2004 he graduated from Siberian State Transport University specializing in "accounting, analysis and audit", returning to the post of head of department of Novosibirsk Oblast's Finance and Tax Policy Department. He remained in this role until 2010, undertaking further studies at the Siberian Research Institute of Agricultural Economics and graduating in 2007.

Between 2010 and 2011, Gornin was Novosibirsk Oblast's acting Minister of Finance and Tax Policy, before being confirmed in the role. In 2011, he became acting First Deputy Governor of Novosibirsk Oblast, and was then confirmed in the role until 2012. On 25 August 2012 he was appointed a Deputy Ministry of Finance of Russia, becoming a First Deputy Minister of Finance on 25 May 2018. He held this post until 17 June 2024, when by decree of the President of Russia, he was appointed First Deputy Minister of Defence, replacing Ruslan Tsalikov. He is a Doctor of Economics, and has held the civilian rank of a 1st class Active State Councillor of the Russian Federation since 2019.

Gornin is married, with two children.

== Academic work ==
In addition to his degrees, Gornin received diplomas on advanced training from the Academy of Budget and Treasury of the Ministry of Finance in 1997, and the Academy of National Economy in 2006. He defended his 2007 dissertation for the degree of candidate of economic sciences on the topic "Improving the economic efficiency of agricultural production based on state regulation: based on the materials of the Novosibirsk Region", and in 2019 his doctoral dissertation on the topic "Scientific Foundations of the Development of a Complex for Industrial Processing of Livestock Products: Based on Materials from Siberian Regions". He authored the monograph "Industrial processing of non-food raw materials of meat livestock: a systems approach" (2018), and is co-author of the book Conceptual Foundations for Organizing Industrial Processing of Non-Food Raw Materials of Meat Livestock (2020).

== Honours and awards ==
Over his career Gornin has been awarded the Order "For Merit to the Fatherland" Third and Fourth Classes, the Order of Alexander Nevsky, the Order of Honour, the Order of Friendship, and the Stolypin Medal first class in 2022.
