= Andrey Kartapolov =

Russian politician (born 1963)

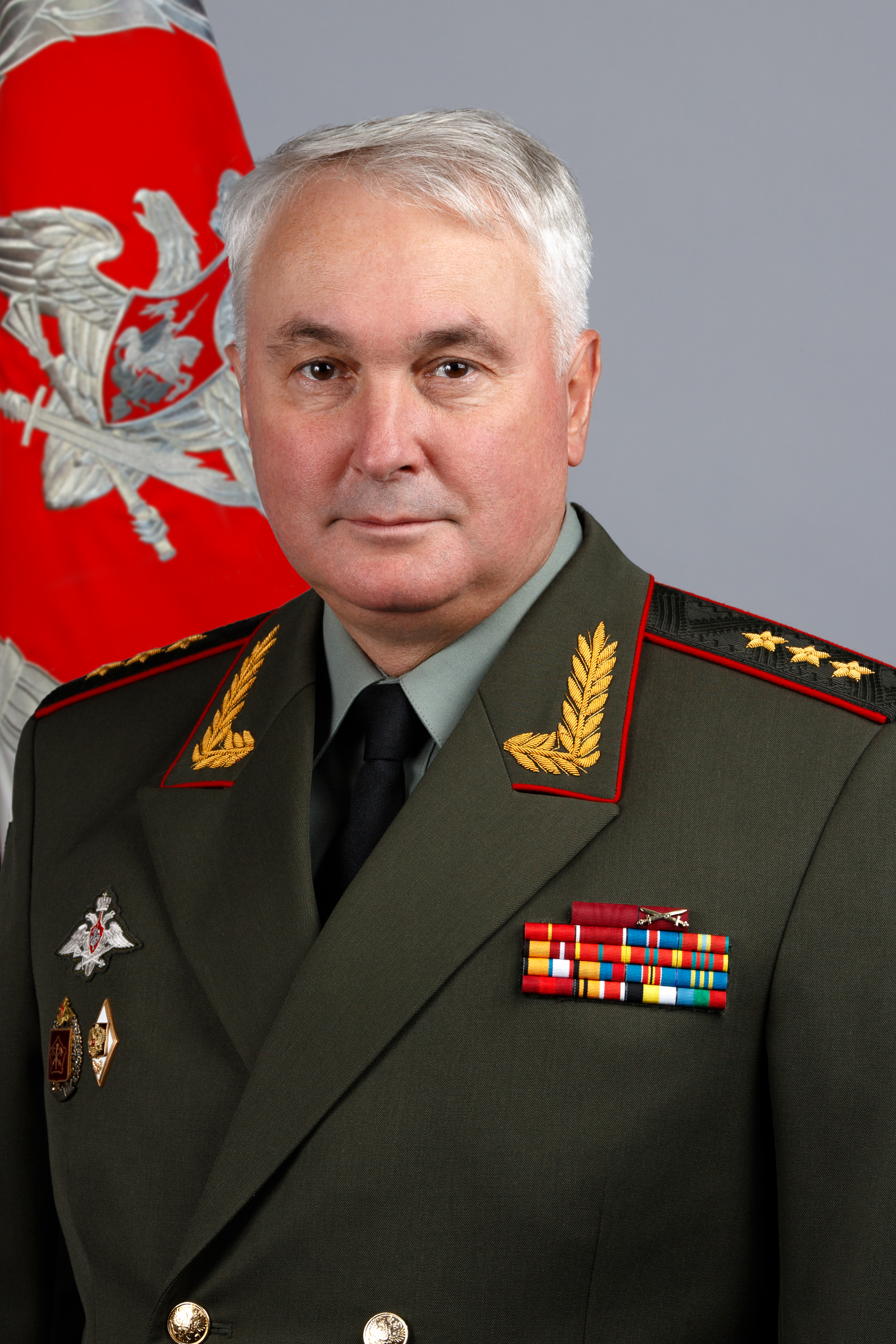

Chairman of the State Duma defense committee
- In office 12 October 2021 – 30 September 2026
- Preceded by: Vladimir Shamanov
- Succeeded by: Vladimir Kasatonov

Member of the State Duma
- Incumbent
- Assumed office 19 September 2021
- Constituency: Party list

Personal details
- Born: Andrey Valeryevich Kartapolov; 9 November 1963 (age 62) Weimar, East Germany
- Party: United Russia (2021–present)
- Education: Moscow Higher Military Command School; Frunze Military Academy; Military Academy of the General Staff of the Armed Forces of Russia

Military service
- Allegiance: Soviet Union; Russia
- Branch/service: Soviet Army; Russian Ground Forces
- Years of service: 1980–2021
- Rank: Colonel general
- Commands: Western Military District
- Battles/wars: Syrian Civil War

Andrey Valeryevich Kartapolov (Russian: Андрей Валериевич Картаполов; born 9 November 1963) is a Russian politician and former army officer of the Russian Army. He was the chairman of the State Duma Russia defense committee from 2021 to 2026.

From 30 July 2018 to October 2021 he served as Deputy Defence Minister, and headed the Main Military-Political Directorate of the Russian Armed Forces. He had commanded the Western Military District from 2015 to 2016, and again from 2017 to 2018. Kartapolov has held the rank of colonel general since 2015. He is currently a member of parliament, a deputy of the State Duma, elected on 19 September 2021.

== Biography ==
=== Early life and studies ===
Andrey Kartapolov was born in Weimar, East Germany, on 9 November 1963. He graduated from the Moscow Higher Combined Arms Command School named after the Supreme Soviet of the RSFSR in 1985, the Frunze Military Academy in 1993, and the Military Academy of the General Staff of the Armed Forces of Russia in 2007.

=== Military service ===
Kartapolov rose from platoon commander to commander of a motorized rifle division in the Group of Soviet Forces in Germany, the Western Group of Forces, and the Far Eastern Military District. From 2007 to 2008, he was the Deputy Commander of the 41st Army in the Siberian Military District, and from 2008 to 2009, he was the Chief of Staff of the 22nd Guards Army in the Moscow Military District. From 2009 to 2010, he was the Head of the Directorate of the Main Operational Directorate of the General Staff of the Russian Armed Forces.

From May 2010 to January 2012, Kartapolov was the Commander of the 58th Army of the North Caucasus, then the Southern Military District. Between January 2012 and February 2013, he was the Deputy Commander of the Southern Military District. On 13 December 2012, Kartapolov was awarded the rank of lieutenant general. From February 2013 to June 2014, he was the Chief of Staff of the Western Military District.

Between June 2014 and 9 November 2015, he was the Chief of the Main Operations Directorate - Deputy Chief of the General Staff of the Armed Forces of Russia. During this time he was a close associate of Valery Gerasimov and emphasized "preemption and asymmetric measures against expected NATO courses of action".

On 11 June 2015, Kartapolov was promoted to colonel general. On 10 November 2015, Kartapolov was appointed commander of the Western Military District. On 23 November 2015, he was presented by the Minister of Defense, Sergey Shoygu, to the leadership of the Western Military District and he was awarded the standard of the commander of the district.

From 19 December 2016 to March 2017, Kartapolov was the commander of the Russian military intervention in the Syrian civil war. During his command after an operation involving Russian aviation and Russian Special Operations Forces on 2 March 2017, Palmyra was returned to the control of the Syrian government for the second time. Victorious, said he:

I’d like to highlight the actions of our Aerospace Forces, which deprived the enemy of the ability to maneuver and timely deliver reinforcements, [as well as] the actions of the subdivisions of the Special Forces of the Russian military, which conducted reconnaissance and hit the most important objects... We spent a lot of time preparing it, taking into account all the special factors that were revealed during the previous retaking of Palmyra, which allowed us to carry out the task within a short time and with minimal losses... I think the most important thing is that the Syrian soldiers and officers believed in themselves, they believed that they can return what they had lost.

=== Civil service ===
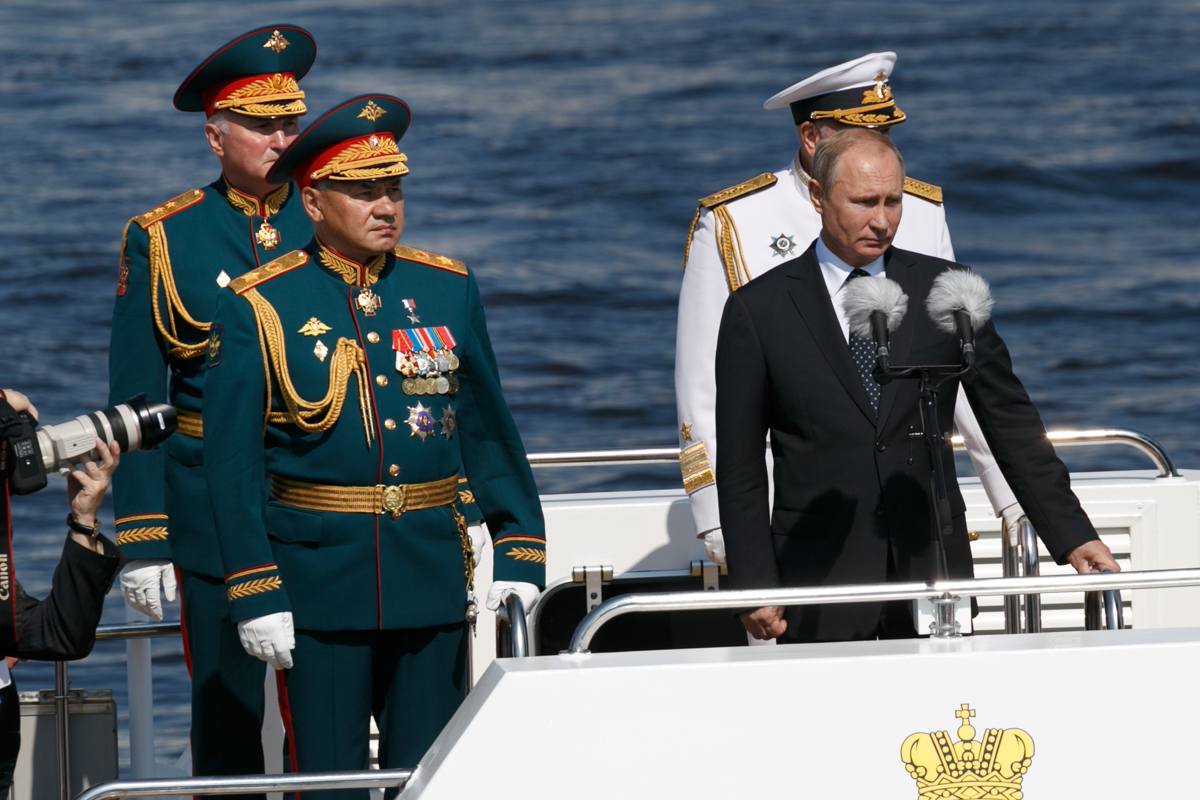
Kartapolov with Russian President Vladimir Putin and Defense Minister Sergei Shoigu, 29 July 2018

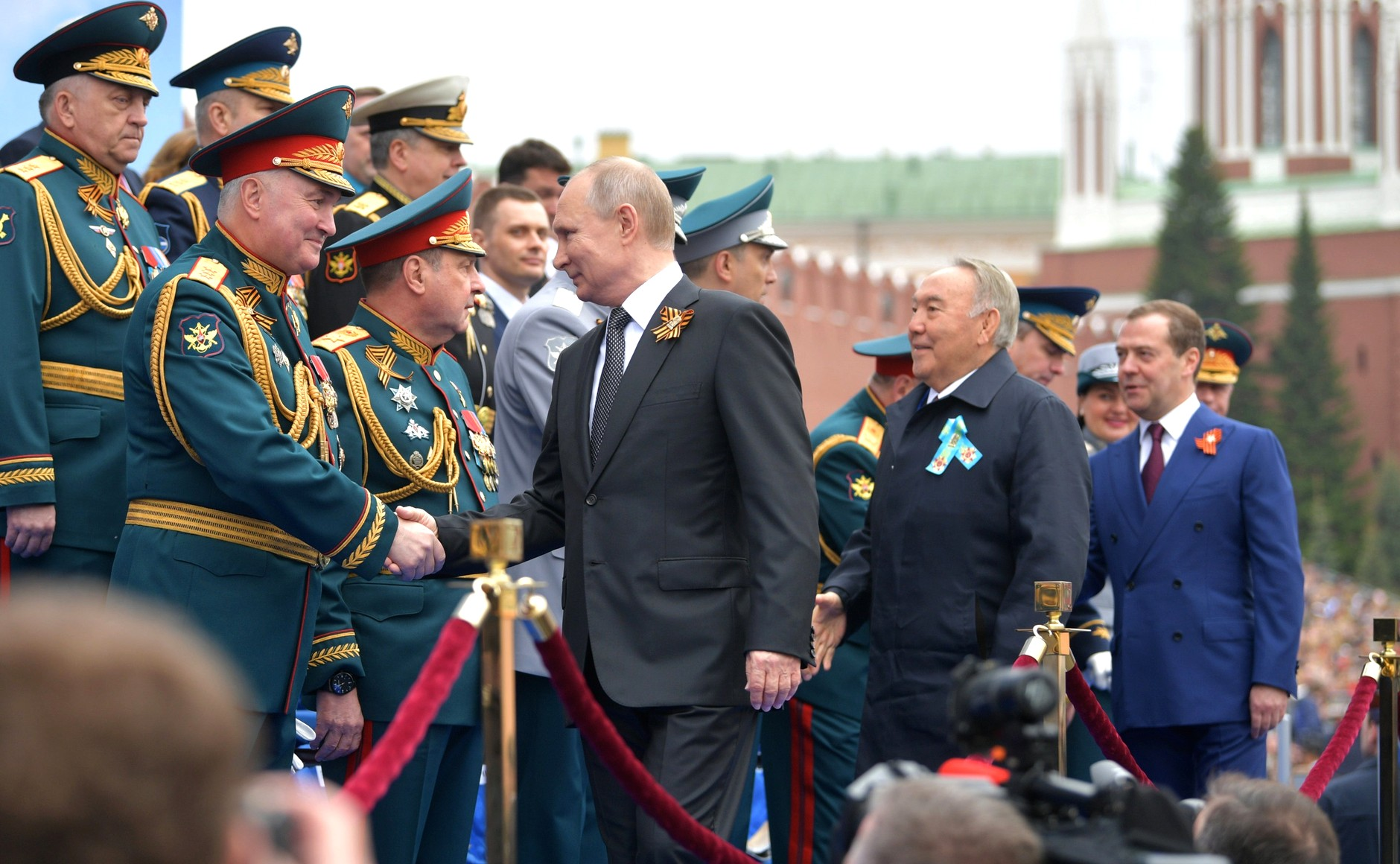
Kartapolov shakes hands with Russian President Putin, 9 May 2019

On 30 July 2018, by decree of the President of Russia, Kartapolov was appointed Deputy Minister of Defense, the Head of the Main Military-Political Directorate. He thus became the ninth Deputy Minister of Defense of Russia and headed the GVPU, recreated on the same day, to strengthen military-patriotic education in the Armed Forces of Russia. On 9 August 2018, he was presented to the personnel, on 31 August 2018, the Minister of Defense, Shoygu, presented him with a personal standard. In addition to the Main Military-Political Directorate, Kartapolov is subordinate to the Department of Culture of the Russian Ministry of Defense, the Directorate of the Ministry of Defense, for work with citizens' appeals and the Military Heraldic Service of the Armed Forces of Russia.

On 18 November 2019, the Decree of the President of Russia, No. 561, Kartapolov was included in the Heraldic Council of the President of the Russian Federation.

He is a member of the Collegium of the Ministry of Defense.

At the end of April 2021, Kartapolov applied for participation in the primaries of the United Russia party. If he wins, he will participate in the upcoming elections to the State Duma on a party list in Moscow.

=== Political service ===
Kartapolov was elected on 19 September 2021 a deputy of the 8th State Duma, and as of April 2023 chaired the Defence Committee there.

On 5 October 2021, by decree of the President of Russia, Kartapolov was relieved of his post as head of the Main Military-Political Directorate and released from military service in connection with his transfer to work in the State Duma.

On 18 March 2022 Kartapolov informed other members of the CSTO Parliamentary Assembly (PA) about Russian investigations of US involvement in Ukrainian biolabs.

On 10 April 2023 as chair of the Defense Committee Kartapolov stated that soon-to-come legislative amendments would make it illegal to ignore electronic all military draft summonses. If the legislation is passed, "it will limit draft evaders’ rights to drive a vehicle, buy and sell real estate, apply for credit, and leave the country."

On 11 April 2023 Kartapolov made a statement to the State Duma about his committee's investigation into activities of the supposed US biological laboratories in Ukraine.

In July 2023, Kartapolov was responsible for new legislation which established regional military companies that will be in charge of "guarding the state border in times of war." The legislation would come into effect on 1 January 2024.

Kartapolov praised Putin for his decision to remove as Minister of Defence Sergey Shoigu amid the spring 2024 general house-cleaning in the ministry and said: “The president does not make mistakes in personnel matters.”

On 24 June 2024 Kartapolov warned that Russia might change the doctrine for the application of nuclear weapons, to shorten the chain of command and thus to speed delivery. This followed Putin's earlier announcement to the same effect.

In late July 2024, the State Duma has passed a law that will make it a disciplinary offence for Russian soldiers to possess smart devices, the law now requires President Putin's signature to come into force. The draft law was introduced by Andrey Kartapolov, as Chairman of the Parliamentary Defense Committee. It bans Russian soldiers from using devices that connect to the internet, that geolocate, take pictures or can take audio/video recordings. Duma members debated the law, as Russian soldiers use smart devices for communication and to control drones. However Andrey Kartapolov said a total ban was the only way to "protect the Russian military from the bad influence of the Internet."

In July 2025, the State Duma passed a law officially restoring the Federal Security Service's authority to operate its own detention centers. Russian investigative journalists Andrei Soldatov and Irina Borogan described the legislation as "a foundation for a new Gulag” and predicted a major expansion of political repression in Russia. Kartapolov, who was the initiator of the bill, stated: "Unlike Europe, we have an absolutely transparent judicial system and penal system. Therefore, everything will be transparent and controlled. Primarily by the legislative power. And by the courts."

=== Sanctions ===
Kartapolov was sanctioned by the UK government in 2015 for his role in the Russo-Ukrainian War.

On 16 February 2015, the European Union included him in the sanctions list of persons whose assets are frozen in the EU and in respect of whom visa restrictions have been introduced.

He is one of the members of the State Duma sanctioned by the United States Treasury on 24 March 2022 in response to the Russian invasion of Ukraine.

== Controversies ==
=== Allegations of involvement in the destruction of MH17 ===
On 17 July 2014, a Buk-M1 missile, according to unofficial foreign experts, from the 53rd Anti-Aircraft Missile Brigade of the Russian Air Defense, shot down a Boeing 777 belonging to Malaysian Airlines over the territory of Ukraine, killing 298 people. According to an unofficial international research group investigating the disaster, Buk-M1 installations were secretly transferred to Ukraine in June 2014. The 53rd Anti-Aircraft Missile Brigade of the Air Defense belongs to the Western Military District, of which Kartapolov was the chief of staff at that time. Thus, according to experts, the transfer of anti-aircraft systems by his subordinates to the territory of Ukraine and the attack of air targets over its territory took place with his knowledge and on his order.

On 21 July 2014, Kartapolov, taking part in a press conference of the Ministry of Defense, said that the means of radar surveillance of the Ministry of Defense recorded that shortly before the crash, a Su-25 aircraft of the Armed Forces of Ukraine was flying at a distance of 3–5 km from the Malaysian Boeing. According to statements published on the Bellingcat website, a check carried out by international experts showed that the data provided by Kartapolov was deliberately fabricated and no Ukrainian military aircraft were recorded in the vicinity of Boeing on the day of the crash. The Ministry of Defense declared that these conclusions were far-fetched.

On 26 September 2016, at a briefing by the Russian Ministry of Defense, Deputy Chief Designer of the Lianozovsky Electromechanical Plant Research and Production Association Viktor Meshcheryakov said that the Utyos T radar complex showed that there were no third-party air objects near the Malaysian aircraft. This statement was made in the presence of the official representative of the Ministry of Defense, Major General Igor Konashenkov and the head of the radio-technical troops of the Aerospace Forces, Major General Andrey Koban. This information is an actual refutation of Kartapolov's statement two years earlier.

=== Involvement in Political Repression ===
The Anti-Corruption Foundation (FBK) accused Kartapolov of coordinating the forced conscription into the army of its employees Ruslan Shaveddinov, Artyom Ionov, and Ivan Konovalov. As a result, Kartapolov was included by Alexei Navalny in a list of 35 officials who, in his view, should be subjected to sanctions. Ahead of the 2021 elections, the foundation published an investigation according to which Andrei Kartapolov’s daughter owns a stake in the authorized capital of the Brasovsky Machine-Building Plant, which produces, among other things, specialized containers for ammunition.

Military offices
Preceded by Anatoly Khrulyov	Commander of the 58th Army; 2010–2012	Succeeded by Andrey Gurulyov
Preceded by ???	Deputy Commander of the Southern Military District; 2012–2013	Succeeded by Andrey Serdyukov
Preceded by Nikolai Maksimov	Chief of Staff and First Deputy Commander of the Western Military District; 2013–2014	Succeeded by Viktor Astapov
Preceded by Vladimir Zarudnitsky	Chief of the Main Operational Directorate of the General Staff of the Russian Armed Forces; 2014–2015	Succeeded by Sergey Rudskoy
Preceded by Viktor Astapov	Commander of the Western Military District; 2015–2016	Succeeded by Viktor Astapov; Acting
Preceded by Aleksandr Zhuravlyov	Commander of the Group of Forces in the Syrian Arab Republic; 2016–2017	Succeeded by Sergey Surovikin
Preceded by Viktor Astapov; Acting	Commander of the Western Military District; 2017–2018	Succeeded by Aleksandr Zhuravlyov
Directorate created	Chief of the Main Military-Political Directorate of the Russian Armed Forces; 2018–2021	Succeeded by Gennady Zhidko
