= Medal "Participant of the military operation in Syria" =

Russian military medal

Medal "Participant in the military operation in Syria"
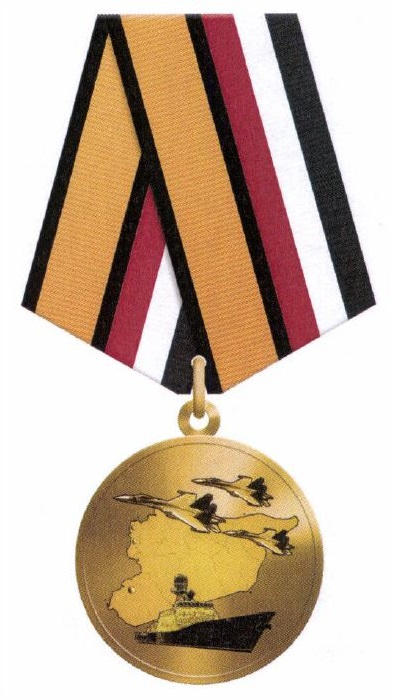
- Type: Ministry of Defense decoration
- Presented by: Russian Federation
- Eligibility: Citizens of the Russian Federation
- Status: Active
- Established: 30 November 2015
- Ribbon of the Medal "Participant of the military operation in Syria"

Precedence
- Next (higher): Medal of Kalashnikov
- Next (lower): Medal "For Impeccable Service"

The Medal "Participant of the military operation in Syria" (Russian: Медаль «Участнику военной операции в Сирии») is an award of the Ministry of Defense of the Russian Federation. It was created by order of Sergei Shoigu on November 30, 2015 No. 732. The medal is awarded to servicemen and civilian personnel of the Russian Armed Forces, who participated in or assisted the Syrian or Russian forces in the Russian military operation in Syria.

== Description ==
The medal is made of gold-colored metal in a circular shape with a diameter of 32 mm, with a convex edge on both sides. On the obverse of the medal: a relief monochrome image of military equipment: three fighter jets at the top, a missile ship at the bottom on the outline of the borders of Syria. On the reverse of the medal, in the upper center, there is a relief monochrome image of the emblem of the Ministry of Defense of the Russian Federation, crowned with a double-headed eagle with outstretched wings. In the eagle's right paw is a sword, in the left is an oak wreath. On the eagle's chest is a triangular, downward-sloping shield with a shaft rising to the crown.

In the field of the shield - a rider striking a dragon with a spear, below it - a relief inscription in four lines "participant in the military operation in Syria", in a circle - a relief inscription: in the upper part - "Ministry of Defense", in the lower part - "Russian Federation ". The medal is attached by means of an eye and a ring to a pentagonal pad covered with a silk moiré ribbon 24 mm wide. From the right edge of the ribbon, an orange stripe 10 mm wide, bordered on the right by a black stripe 2 mm wide, on the left - red, white and black stripes of equal size.

In March 2016, the Ministry of Defense of the Russian Federation ordered the production of 10,300 such medals.

== History ==
Syrian President Bashar Assad took advantage of the formal treaty "On friendship and cooperation between the USSR and Syria" dated October 8, 1980 and on September 30, 2015, he turned to the Russian Federation for military assistance. The Federation Council of the Russian Federation agreed to help, limiting the offer to the use of the Russian Aerospace Forces to help the ground forces of Syria from the air, without conducting a ground operation.

The same day, an air group of the Russian Federation, consisting of bombers and attack aircraft under the cover of fighter jets and helicopters, began to carry out strikes on militant groups. Long-range aircraft and special forces were involved in the operation, some targets were struck with cruise missiles from the ships of the Caspian Flotilla and the Black Sea Fleet near Russian-occupied Crimea.

== Awarding ==
On March 15, 2016, Russian Deputy Defense Minister Nikolay Pankov and Syrian Army Chief of Staff Ali Abdullah Ayyoub awarded the military with Syrian and Russian awards at the Khmeimim Air Base.

On March 17, 2016, a ceremony was held when three Su-24 bombers arrived back from Syria at the Shagol airbase near Chelyabinsk.

On December 12, 2017, a ceremony was held when a fleet of Tu-22M3 long-range bombers arrived back from Syria at the Shaykovka air base near Kirov, Kaluga Oblast, where lieutenant general and Long-Range Aviation commander Sergey Kobylash awarded crews with the medal.

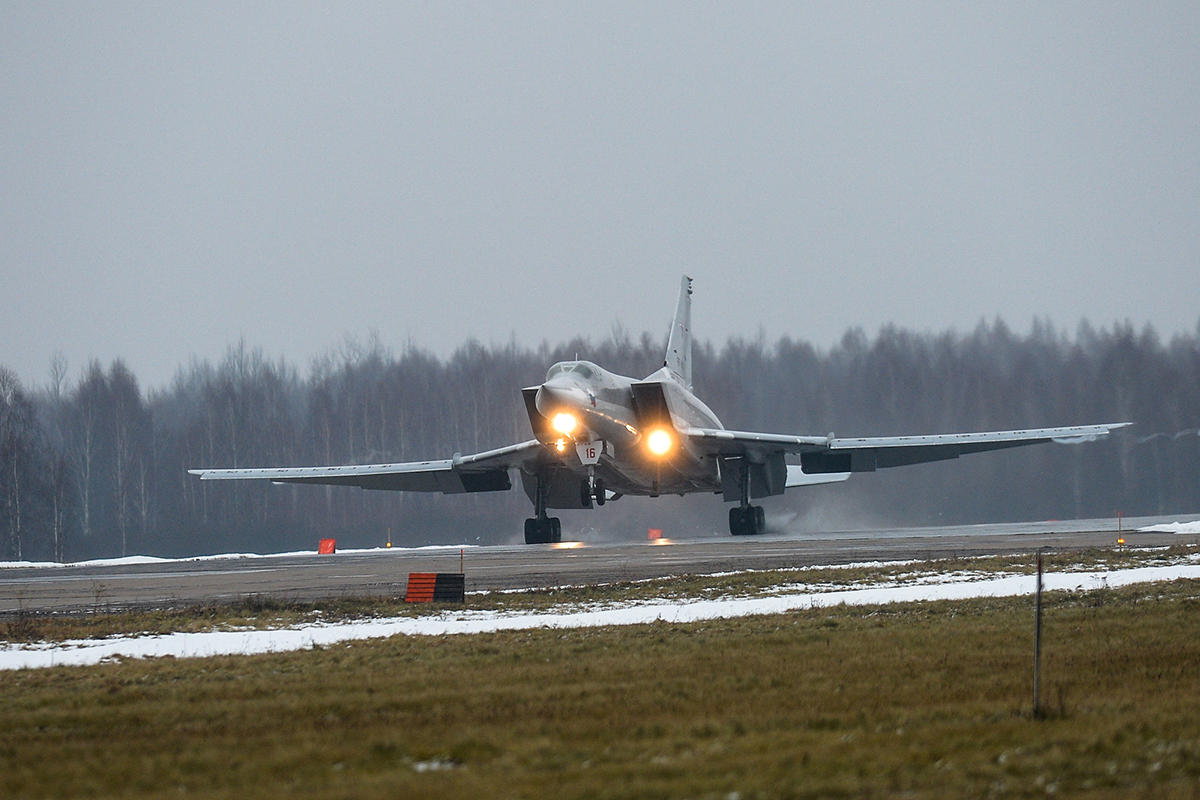
Tu-22M3 landing at Shaykovka air base after its bombing mission in Syria

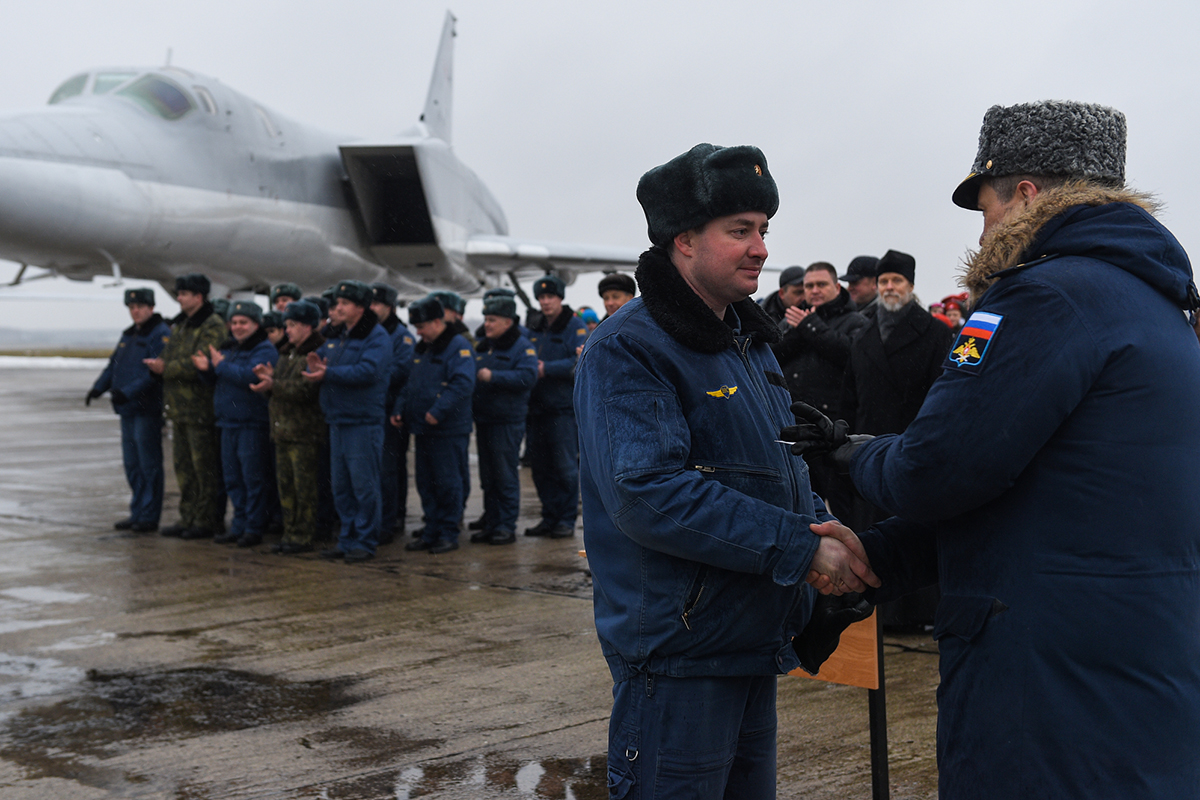
Tu-22M3 crew member being awarded at Shaykovka air base for his bombing mission in Syria

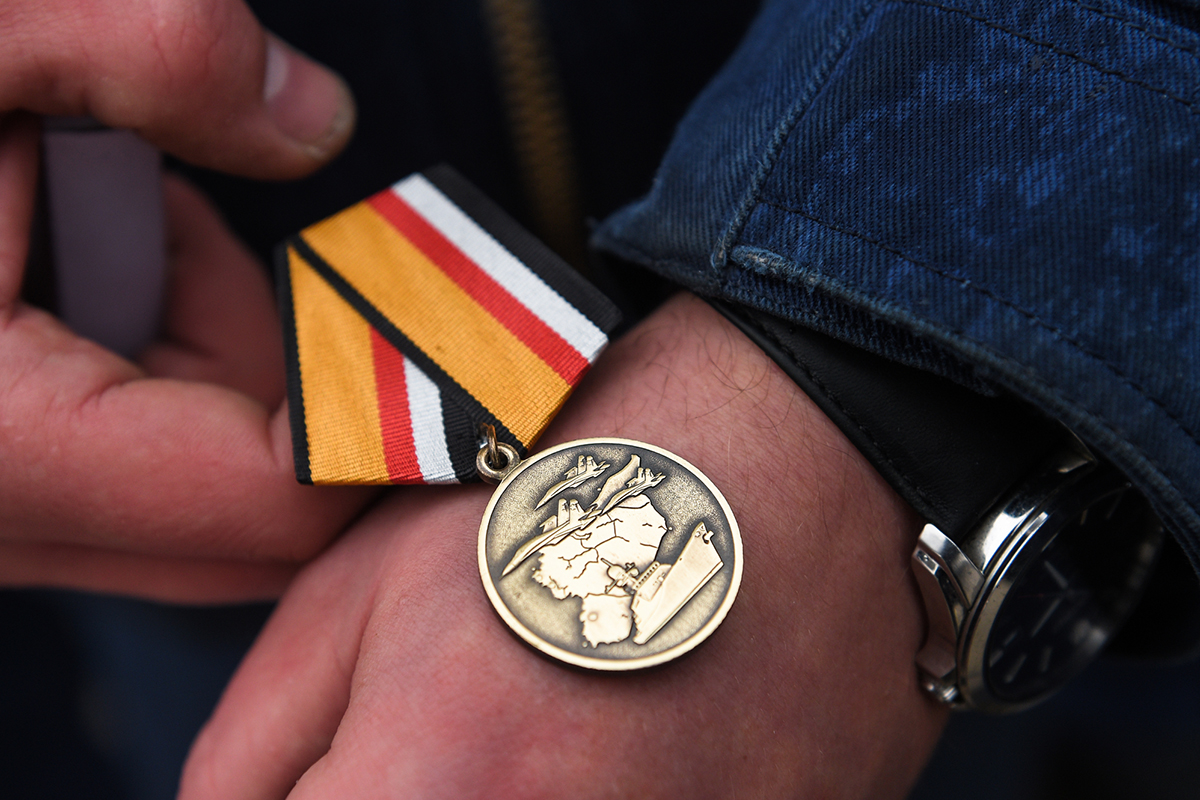
Medal awarded at Shaykovka air base for bombing mission in Syria

== Civilian participation ==
Since the beginning of 2016, civilians such as artists, athletes, and politicians who visited Khmeimim Air Base to hold events for the military have also been widely awarded.
