= Ministry of Defence (Russia) =

Government ministry of Russia

Ministry of Defence of the Russian Federation
- Министерство обороны Российской Федерации; Ministerstvo oborony Rossiiskoi Federatsii
- Ministry emblem

- Ministry flag

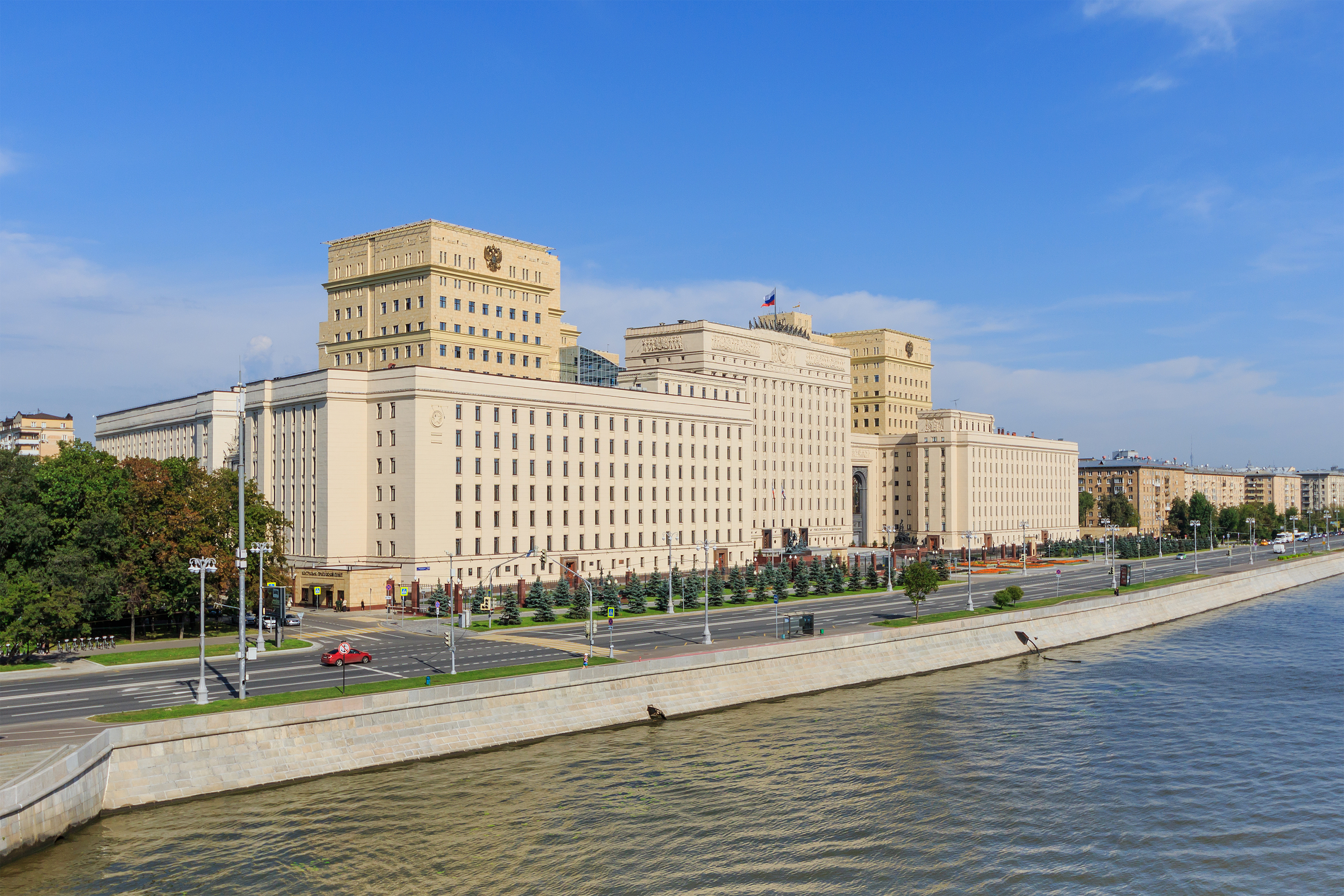
- The building of the National Defense Management Center on Frunzenskaya Embankment (house No. 22) in Moscow, the ministry headquarters

Agency overview
- Formed: 16 March 1992 (first in 1717 as College of War)
- Preceding agencies: Ministry of Defence of the Soviet Union (1946–1992); People's Commissariat of Defense of the Soviet Union (1934–1946); People's Commissariat for Military and Naval Affairs (1923–1934); Council of People's Commissars on War and Navy Affairs (Soviet Russia) (1917–1923); Ministry of War of the Russian Empire (1802–1917); College of War (1717–1802)
- Jurisdiction: President of Russia
- Headquarters: Znamenka 19, Moscow, Russia; 55°43′40″N 37°35′22″E
- Annual budget: US$69.3 billion (2014)
- Minister responsible: Andrey Belousov, Minister of Defence
- Agency executive: Valery Gerasimov, Chief of the General Staff
- Child agency: Federal Service for Military-Technical Cooperation Federal Service for Technical and Export Control Federal Service for Defence Contracts Federal Agency for Special Construction Federal Agency for the supply of arms, military and special equipment and material supplies
- Website: eng.mil.ru

The Ministry of Defence of the Russian Federation (Russian: Министерство обороны Российской Федерации/Минобороны России; MoD) is the governing body of the Russian Armed Forces. The president of Russia is the commander-in-chief of the forces and directs the activity of the ministry. The minister of defence exercises day-to-day administrative and operational authority over the forces. The General Staff of the Armed Forces executes the instructions and orders of the president and the defence minister.

The ministry is headquartered in the General Staff building, built-in 1979–1987 on Arbatskaya Square, near Arbat Street in Moscow. Other buildings of the ministry are located throughout Moscow. The supreme body responsible for the ministry's management and supervision of the Armed Forces and the centralization of the Armed Forces' command is the National Defense Management Center, located in the Main Building of the Ministry of Defense, built in the 1940s on Frunzenskaya Embankment.

The current Minister of Defence is Andrey Belousov (since 14 May 2024).

== History ==
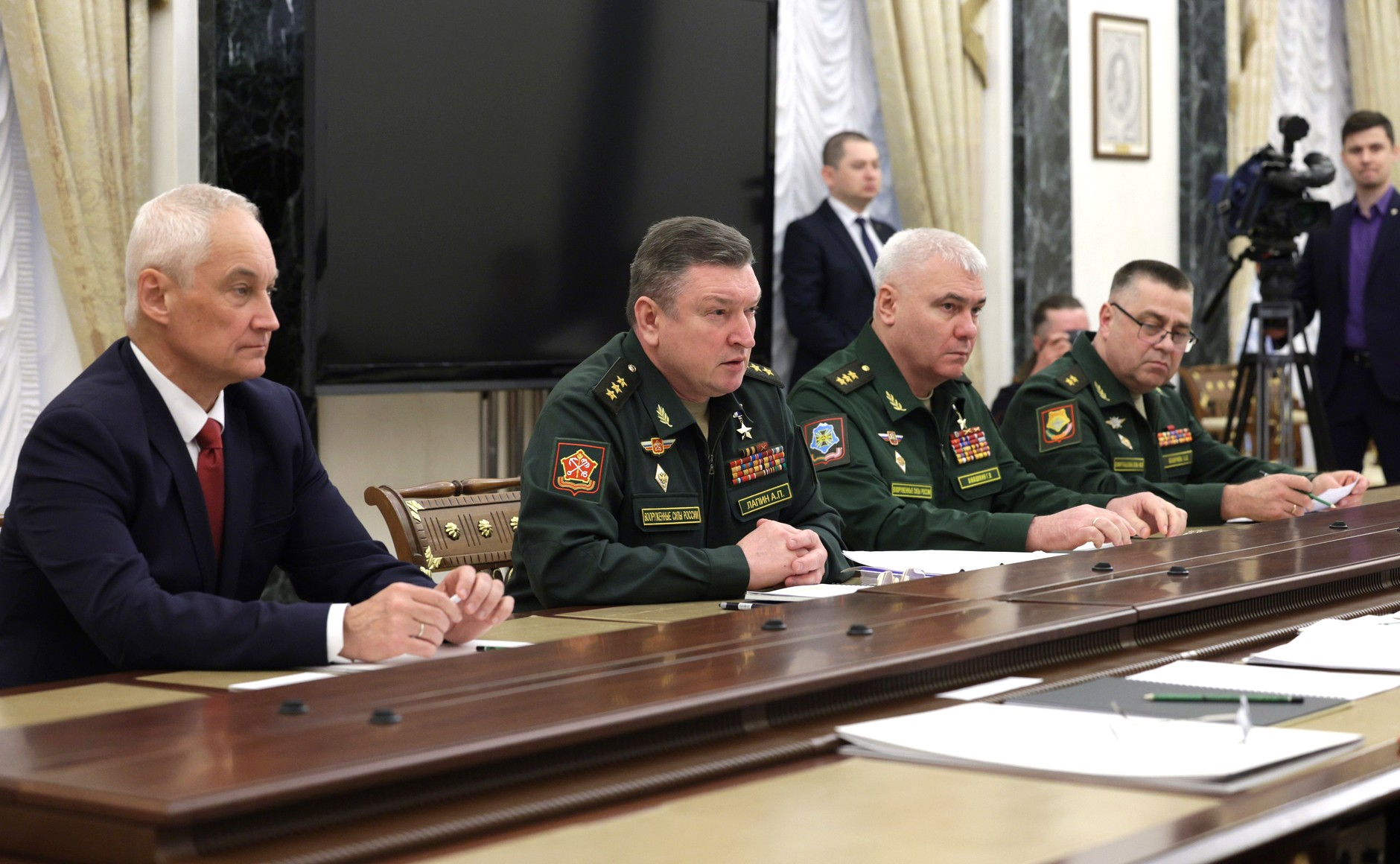
Defence Minister Andrey Belousov with military district commanders

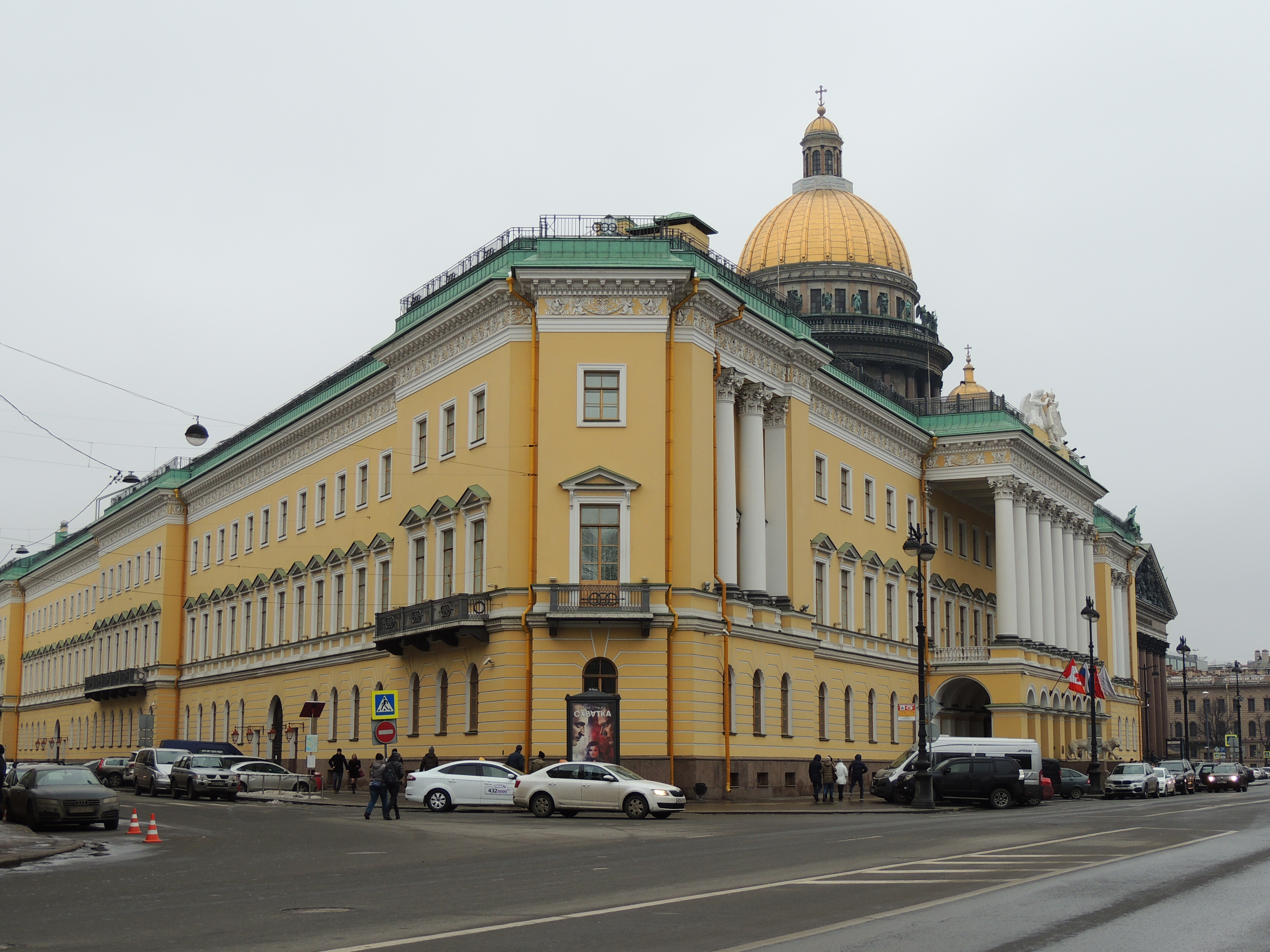
Lobanov-Rostovsky Palace in Saint Petersburg, former Defence Ministry building

The U.S. Library of Congress Country Studies' volume for Russia said in July 1996 that:

[The] structure [...] does not imply military subordination to civilian authority in the Western sense [...]. The historical tradition of military command is considerably different in Russia. The tsars were educated as officers, and they regularly wore military uniforms and carried military ranks. Stalin always wore a military uniform, and he assumed the title generalissimo. Even General Secretary Leonid I. Brezhnev [...] appointed himself general of the army, and he encouraged portraits of himself in full uniform. By tradition dating back to the tsars, the minister of defence normally is a uniformed officer. The State Duma also seats a large number of deputies who are active-duty military officers—another tradition that began in the Russian imperial era. These combinations of military and civilian authority ensure that military concerns are considered at the highest levels of the Russian government.

On 18 May 1992, President of Russia Boris Yeltsin appointed General of the Army Pavel Grachev to the post of Minister of Defence. Despite intense criticism of Grachev's management of the First Chechen War and the Russian military establishment in general, Yeltsin retained Grachev till 18 June 1996. The new minister of defence became General of the Army Igor Rodionov, who subsequently was substituted by Marshal of the Russian Federation Igor Sergeyev.

In March 2001, Sergei Ivanov, previously secretary of the Security Council of Russia, was appointed defence minister by President Vladimir Putin, becoming Russia's first non-uniformed civilian defence minister. Putin called the personnel changes in Russia's security structures coinciding with Ivanov's appointment as defence minister "a step toward demilitarizing public life." Putin also stressed Ivanov's responsibility for overseeing military reform as defence minister. What Putin did not emphasise was Ivanov's long service within the KGB and FSB and his then rank of General-Lieutenant within the FSB. Such military and security agency-associated men are known as siloviki.

As of 2002, there were four living Marshals of the Soviet Union. Such men are automatically Advisors to the Defence Minister. The Marshals alive at that time were Viktor Kulikov, Vasily Petrov, Sergei Sokolov, a former Minister of Defence of the Soviet Union, and Dmitri Yazov. Yazov was listed by the American analysts Scott and Scott in 2002 as a consultant to the (formerly 10th) Directorate for International Military Cooperation.

The allegedly first non-uniformed Defence Minister was Anatoly Serdyukov, appointed in February 2007. Serdyukov was a former Tax Minister with seemingly little substantial siloviki or military associations beyond his two years of compulsory military service. Serdyukov launched the military reform in 2008.

On 19 August 2010, Serdyukov appointed Tatyana Shevtsova as his deputy. As of that date, more than 50 women had been appointed by Serdyukov, and mainly in the tax accountant profession.

In 2012, he was substituted by General of the Army Sergey Shoigu, who held at that moment the position of the Minister of Civil Defence, Emergency Situations and Disaster Relief (EMERCOM).

In May 2024, simultaneous with the Fifth inauguration of Vladimir Putin on the 14th, Sergey Shoigu was released from duty and several of his staff were investigated for corruption or other misdeeds: Yuri Vasilievich Kuznetsov, Timur Ivanov, Ruslan Tsalikov, as well as Vadim Shamarin, Ivan Ivanovich Popov, Vladimir Verteletsky, and Sukhrab Akhmedov.

On 17 June 2024, it was noted that four deputy defence ministers, Nikolay Pankov, Ruslan Tsalikov, Tatiana Shevtsova and Pavel Popov, had been sacked for nepotism that had entered the Ministry. Russian energy minister Sergey Tsivilyov's wife, Anna Tsivileva, the daughter of a cousin of the President, was appointed deputy defence minister. Her responsibilities include improving social and housing support for military personnel. Leonid Gornin, previously the first deputy finance minister, was appointed as the first deputy defence minister. Other personnel changes included Oleg Savelyev and the son of former Prime Minister Mikhail Fradkov. Pavel Fradkov would oversee the management of property, land and construction relating to the military. Other reports had Tsivileva as Putin's niece.

On 18 July it was revealed that Lt. Gen. Vadim Shamarin had been formally dismissed from his post because he had accepted bribes from a supplier. He had been serving as deputy chief of the army’s general staff, overseeing the signals corps and military communications.

On 24 July Andrei Torgashev, the Deputy Chief of the Satellite Communications Center for Strategic Nuclear Missile Forces, was apparently victimized at his residence by a car bomb.

== Structure ==
The Ministry of Defence is managed by a collegium chaired by the Defence Minister and including the deputy Defence Ministers, heads of the Main Defence Ministry and General Staff Directorates, the commanders of the Joint Strategic Commands/Military Districts, the three Services, and three branches, who together form the principal staff and advisory board of the Minister of Defence.

The executive body of the Ministry of Defence is the General Staff of the Armed Forces of the Russian Federation, which is headed by the Chief of the General Staff. U.S. expert William Odom said in 1998 that "the Soviet General Staff without the MoD is conceivable, but the MoD without the General Staff is not." Russian General Staff officers exercise command authority in their own right. In 1996 the General Staff included fifteen main directorates and an undetermined number of operating agencies. The staff is organized by functions, with each directorate and operating agency overseeing a functional area, generally indicated by the organization's title.

Military Thought is the military-theoretical journal of the Ministry of Defence, and Krasnaya Zvezda is its daily newspaper.

=== Structure in 2025 ===
Senior staff in 2025 included:

Minister of Defence

- Minister of Defence of the Russian Federation – 1st class Active State Councillor of the Russian Federation Andrey Belousov (since 14 May 2024)

First Deputy Minister(s) of Defence

- Chief of the General Staff – First Deputy Minister of Defence of the Russian Federation – General of the Army Valery Gerasimov (since 9 November 2012)
- First Deputy Minister of Defence of the Russian Federation – 1st class Active State Councillor of the Russian Federation Leonid Gornin (since 17 June 2024)

Deputy Minister(s) of Defence

- Deputy Minister of Defence of the Russian Federation (Responsible for Organising Material-Technical and Logistical Support of the Russian Armed Forces) – Colonel General Aleksandr Sanchik (since 8 November 2025)
- Deputy Minister of Defence of the Russian Federation (Responsible for Organising Financial Support for the Armed Forces) – 1st class Active State Councillor of the Russian Federation Anna Tsivilyova (since 17 June 2024)
- Deputy Minister of Defence of the Russian Federation – Supervisor of the Apparatus of the Ministry of Defence of the Russian Federation – 1st class Active State Councillor of the Russian Federation Oleg Savelyev (since 20 May 2024)
- Deputy Minister of Defence of the Russian Federation (Responsible for the Development of the Technical Basis for the Management System and Information Technology) – 1st class Active State Councillor of the Russian Federation Pavel Fradkov (since 17 June 2024)
- Deputy Minister of Defence of the Russian Federation (Responsible for Organising International Military and Military-Technical Cooperation) – Colonel General Alexander Fomin (since 31 January 2017)
- Deputy Minister of Defence of the Russian Federation (Responsible for Advanced Armaments and Specialized Equipment for the Armed Forces) – 1st class Active State Councillor of the Russian Federation Alexey Krivoruchko (since 13 June 2018)
- Deputy Minister of Defence of the Russian Federation (Responsible for Combat Training) – Army general Yunus-bek Yevkurov (since 8 July 2019)
- Deputy Minister of Defence of the Russian Federation – Chief of the Main Directorate for Political-Military Affairs of the Russian Armed Forces – Army general Viktor Goremykin (since 28 July 2022)
- Deputy Minister of Defence of the Russian Federation - Responsible for the Logistics Support - Valery Solodchuk (since 5 August 2026)

=== Structure in 2021 ===
Senior staff in 2021 included:

Minister of Defence

- Minister of Defence of the Russian Federation – General of the Army Sergei Shoigu (since 6 November 2012)

First Deputy Minister(s) of Defence

- Chief of the General Staff – First Deputy Minister of Defence of the Russian Federation – General of the Army Valery Gerasimov (since 9 November 2012)
- First Deputy Minister of Defence of the Russian Federation – 1st class Active State Councillor of the Russian Federation Ruslan Tsalikov (since 24 December 2015)

Deputy Minister(s) of Defence

- State Secretary – Deputy Minister of Defence of the Russian Federation – 1st class Active State Councillor of the Russian Federation and General of the Army of reserve Nikolay Pankov (since 13 September 2005)
- Deputy Minister of Defence of the Russian Federation (Responsible for Organising Material-Technical Support for the Armed Forces) – Colonel General Mikhail Mizintsev (since 24 September 2022)
- Deputy Minister of Defence of the Russian Federation (Responsible for Organising Financial Support for the Armed Forces) – 1st class Active State Councillor of the Russian Federation Tatiana Shevtsova (since 4 August 2010)
- Deputy Minister of Defence of the Russian Federation – Supervisor of the Apparatus of the Ministry of Defence of the Russian Federation – Colonel General Yuriy Sadovenko (since 7 January 2013)
- Deputy Minister of Defence of the Russian Federation (Responsible for the Development of the Technical Basis for the Management System and Information Technology) – General of the Army Pavel Popov (since 7 November 2013)
- Deputy Minister of Defence of the Russian Federation (Responsible for Organising Property Management, Quartering of Troops (Forces), Housing, and Medical Support for the Armed Forces) – 1st class Active State Councillor of the Russian Federation Timur Ivanov (since 23 May 2016)
- Deputy Minister of Defence of the Russian Federation (Responsible for Organising International Military and Military-Technical Cooperation) – Colonel General Alexander Fomin (since 31 January 2017)
- Deputy Minister of Defence of the Russian Federation (Responsible for Organising Military-Technical Support for the Armed Forces) – 1st class Active State Councillor of the Russian Federation Alexey Krivoruchko (since 13 June 2018)
- Deputy Minister of Defence of the Russian Federation (Responsible for Combat Training) – Colonel General Yunus-Bek Yevkurov (since 8 July 2019)
- Deputy Minister of Defence of the Russian Federation – Chief of the Main Directorate for Political-Military Affairs of the Russian Armed Forces – Colonel general Viktor Goremykin (since 28 July 2022)

=== Organization in 2012 ===
Entities directly subordinated to the Minister of Defence in August 2012 included:

- Ministry of Defence Press Service and Information Directorate
- Ministry of Defence Physical Training Directorate
- Financial Auditing Inspectorate
- Main Military Medical Directorate
- Ministry of Defence State Order Placement Department
- Ministry of Defence Property Relations Department
- Expert Center of the Ministry of Defense Staff
- Ministry of Defence Administration Directorate
- State Defence Order Facilitation Department
- Department of the State Customer for Capital Construction
- State Architectural-Construction Oversight Department
- Sanatoria-resort Support Department
- Housekeeping Directorate
- State Review/Study Group
- Ministry of Defence Educational Department
- Ministry of Defence Legal Department
- Ministry of Defence Organizational-inspection Department
- Ministry of Defence Personnel Inspectorate
- Ministry of Defence Military Inspectorate
- State Technical Oversight Directorate
- Aviation Flight Safety Service
- Nuclear and Radiation Safety Oversight Directorate
- Autotransport Directorate
- Staff Protocol Department
- Armed Forces Weapons Turnover Oversight Service
- Main Military Police Directorate of Ministry of Defence

The Office of Inspectors General of the Ministry of Defence was established in 2008, consisting of around thirty retired senior officers. The main task of the office is "to promote the organization of combat and operational training of troops, the construction and further development of the Armed Forces of the Russian Federation, the development of the theory and history of military art, and the education of personnel." It is the successor to the Soviet Armed Forces's Group of Inspectors General, which was dissolved in 1992.

=== Outline structure 2004 ===
An outline structure of the Ministry of Defence includes the groupings below, but this structure was in transition when it was recorded in 2004, with several deputy minister posts being abolished:

- Federal Service for Military-Technical Cooperation
- Federal Service for the Defence Order
- Federal Service for Technical and Export Control
- Federal Special Construction Agency of the MoD
- 11th Directorate of the MoD (function unclear)
- 12th Main Directorate (nuclear weapons)
- 16th Directorate of the Ministry of Defence (function unclear)
- Hydrometeorological Service of the Armed Forces
- Military Inspectorate
- Directorate of Information and Public Relations
- 1st Separate Brigade of Protection of the Ministry of Defence
- Archives of the Armed Forces (see also Central Archives of the Russian Ministry of Defence)
- State Corporation for Air Traffic Control
- Central Theater of the Russian Army
- All-Russian Centre for Retraining Officers
- General Staff of the Armed Forces of the Russian Federation
  - Directorates, departments, etc.
  - Russian Ground Forces
  - Russian Air Force
  - Russian Navy
  - Strategic Rocket Forces
  - Russian Airborne Troops
  - Russian Space Forces
- First Deputy Minister of Defence
  - Main Directorate for Combat Training of the Armed Forces
  - Directorate of Force Management and Security of Military Service
- Army General Nikolay Pankov, State Secretary – Deputy Min. of Defence
  - Liaison with Political Power Institutions
  - Directorate for Indoctrination (political work, morale)
  - Directorate for International Military Cooperation
  - Directorate for Military Education of the Ministry of Defence
  - Directorate of Foreign Relations
  - Directorate of Force Management & Security of Military Service
  - Directorate of Ecology & Special Means of Protection
  - Press Service of the Ministry of Defence
  - Flight Safety Service of Aviation of the Armed Forces of Russian Federation
- Deputy Minister of Defence – Chief of Rear of the Armed Forces
  - Military medical, trade, transportation, food, clothing, etc.
- Deputy Minister of Defence – Chief of Armaments of the Armed Forces
  - Test ranges, study centres, Military research institutes etc.
  - GRAU
  - Main Automotive-Armoured Tank Directorate of the MoD (GABTU)
  - Autobase of Ministry of Defence
  - Military Registry
  - Federal State Unitary Enterprise Rosoboronexport
  - Military Industrial Council
- Deputy Minister of Defence – Chief of Construction and Billeting Service
  - Main Military Construction Directorate
  - Main Quarters Exploitation Directorate
  - other Directorates, departments etc.
- Lyubov Kudelina

, Deputy Minister of Defence for Financial-Economic Work

  - Financial-Economic Section of the MoD
  - Directorate of Military-Economic Analysis and Expertise
  - Financial Inspectorate of the MoD
  - Federation of Trade Unions for Civilian Workers of the Armed Forces
- Deputy Minister of Defence – Chief of the Main Department of Cadres [personnel]
  - military schools, military academies, etc.

== See also ==
- Awards and emblems of the Ministry of Defence of the Russian Federation
