= Nikolay Pankov (army officer) =

Russian general (born 1954)

- Николай Панков
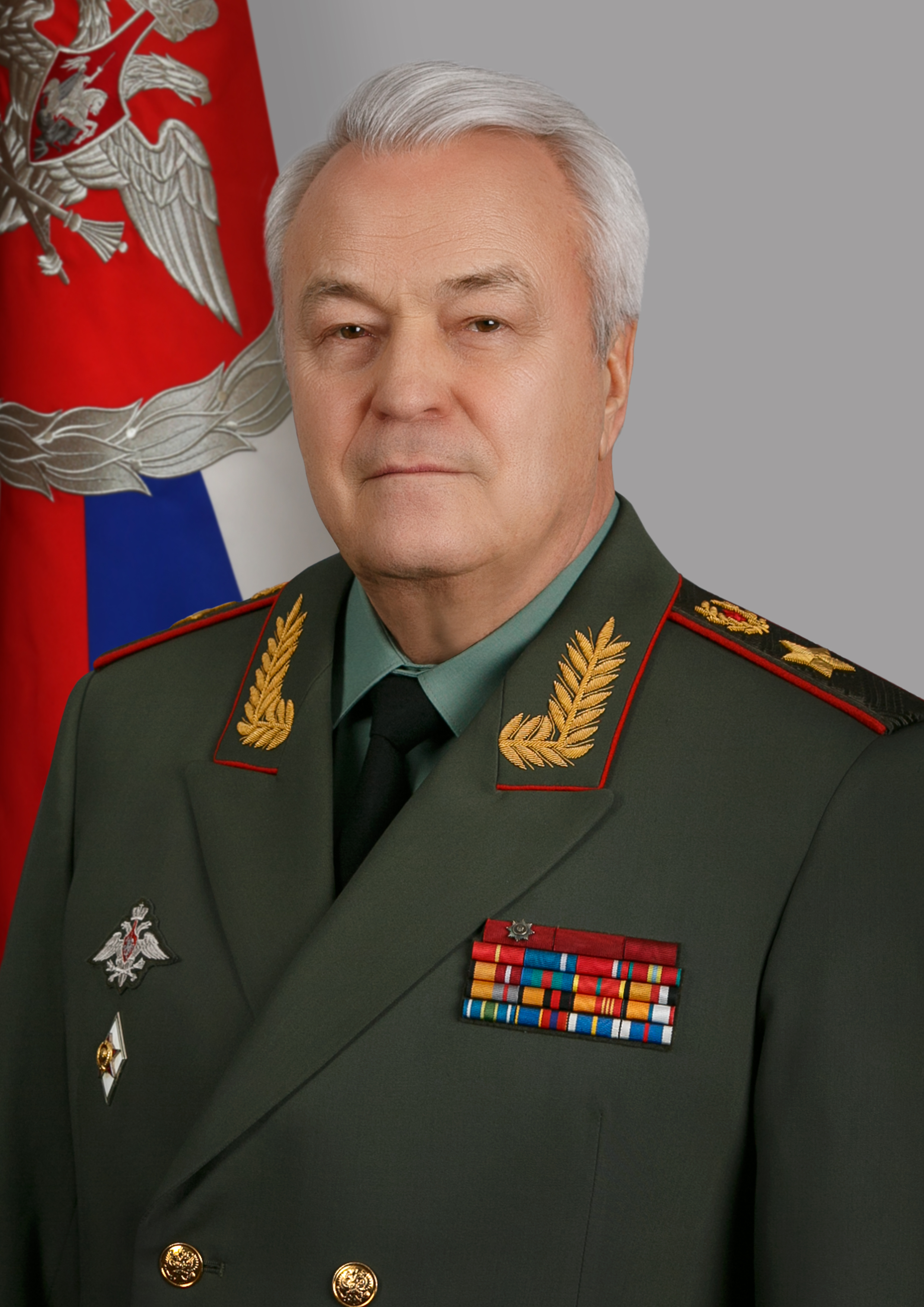
- Official portrait, 2014

State Secretary and Deputy Minister of Defence
- In office 13 September 2005 – 17 June 2024
- Succeeded by: Office cancelled

Personal details
- Born: Nikolay Aleksandrovich Pankov; 2 December 1954 (age 71) Marino, Kostroma Oblast, RSFSR, Soviet Union

Nikolay Aleksandrovich Pankov (Russian: Николай Александрович Панков; born on 2 December 1954) is a former Russian military officer who was the State Secretary and Deputy Minister of Defense of the Russian Federation between 13 September 2005 and 17 June 2024. He is the General of the Reserve Army. He is a 1st class Active State Councillor of the Russian Federation, promoted in 2011. He is a PhD in law, associate professor.

Since 6 October 2022, for supporting the Russian military aggression against Ukraine, he has been under sanctions from all countries of the European Union, the United Kingdom, Canada, and a number of other countries.

== Duties ==
By position, carries out general management of the Military University, the Military Institute of Physical Culture and a number of pre-university educational institutions of the Russian Ministry of Defense.

Since 15 April 2015, he has been the head of the supervisory board of the Central Sports Club of the Army. From 2015 to 2018, he oversaw the Young Army Cadets National Movement.

== Criticism and identified violations ==
Under Pankov's leadership, 40 higher military universities were reduced, and the main blow was dealt to those of them that trained the most high-tech personnel for the Russian army. At the same time, the teaching staff of military universities was reduced by 7 times. The main motive for such a reorganization of military education is the release of buildings belonging to military universities and their sale to affiliated structures.

Under his leadership, 200,000 officers were dismissed from the army. This reduction in the personnel of the Russian Armed Forces, tentatively, cost the state 1.65 trillion rubles.

Pankov played a key role in the Serdyukov dacha scandal near Anapa. He came to Anapa, where he convinced city deputies to transfer to the Ministry of Defense a site at the address Krasnodar Territory, allegedly for the construction of a radar station. The deputies allocated the land, but instead of the radar station, a 600 m^{2} residential building with a swimming pool and a boathouse for yachts was built.

In December 2012, he signed an act on the implementation of all work on the move on a turnkey basis. The Main Military Investigation Department found out that a significant part of the payment was made on the basis of fictitious reporting documents. Pankov signed the turnkey work acceptance certificate, although the work was almost half completed, without his signature the criminals could not have access to the money. At the stage of the investigation, it was found out that by these actions the state suffered damage in the amount of more than 400 million rubles. The participants in the scam received real prison terms, Pankov was not convicted, despite the fact that the defendants called him a key participant in the scam, but he was obliged to reimburse about 600 million rubles, as the court established as a result of the proceedings.

== Family ==
He is married, and has a son and a daughter.
