= Serdyukov =

Serdyukov (Russian: Сердюков) is a Russian masculine surname, its feminine counterpart is Serdyukova. Notable people with the surname include:

- Alex Serdyukov (born 1980), Russian mixed martial artist
- Anastasiya Serdyukova (born 1997), Uzbekistani rhythmic gymnast
- Anatoliy Ivanovich Serdyukov, Russian mathematician, namesake of the Christofides–Serdyukov algorithm
- Anatoliy Serdyukov (born 1962), Russian politician and businessman
- Andrey Serdyukov (born 1962), Russian general, commander of the Russian Airborne Troops
- Ksenia Serdyukova (1892–1919), Russian communist revolutionary
- Sergei Serdyukov (born 1981), Russian football player
- Valery Serdyukov (born 1945), Russian politician
