= Frunzenskaya Embankment =

Street in Moscow, Russia

Coordinates: 55°43′27″N 37°35′18″E

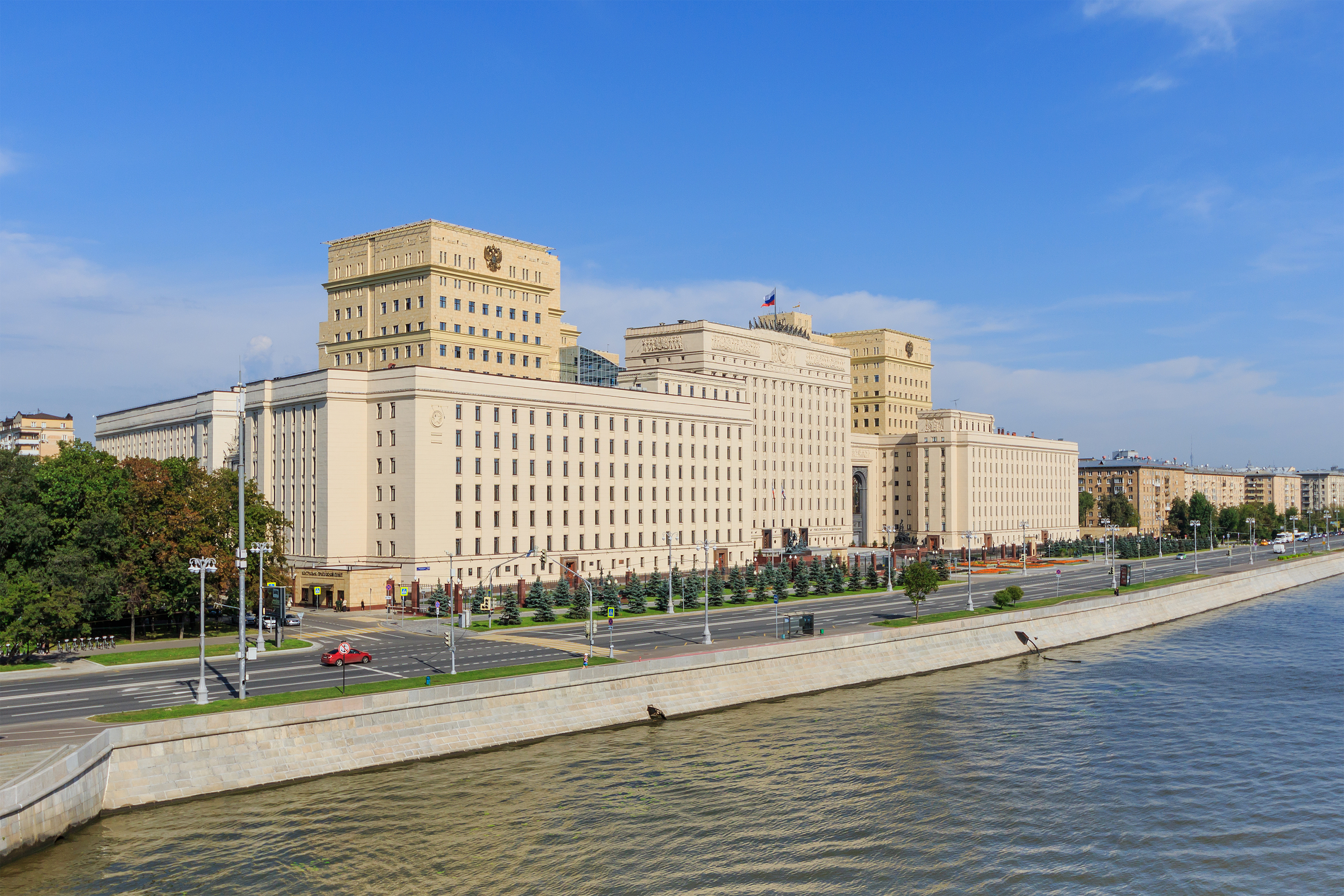
- Frunzenskaya Embankment at Pushkinsky Bridge
- Native name: Фрунзенская набережная (Russian)
- Length: 2.5 km (1.6 mi)
- Location: Moscow, Russia; Central Administrative Okrug
- Nearest metro station: Frunzenskaya; Koltsevaya line Park Kultury

Frunzenskaya Embankment is a street and embankment in Khamovniki District of Moscow. It is a section of the embankment along the Moskva between the Krymsky and Novoandreevsky Bridges.

== Etymology ==
Along with three adjacent streets, Frunzenskaya Embankment was named after the Russian Bolshevik military commander Mikhail Frunze. The embankment's historic and original name is Khamovnicheskaya Embankment. The date of renaming under the Soviet regime in different sources is 1925, 1926, and 1936. The last date is most likely correct, since on the map of Moscow in 1934, the embankment was still called Khamovnicheskaya.

== History ==
The embankment as a passage along the Moskva arose after the construction of the iron Crimean Bridge in 1872. In 1897, the Khamovnicheskaya Embankment project was approved as a city passage to Kamer-Kollezhsky rampart, but it was only partially implemented by 1914. The embankment development, with the exception of several buildings, remained single-story until the mid-1930s. From 1923 to 1936, a tram ran along the embankment.

In 1933, the All-Union Construction Exhibition was opened on the embankment. In the second half of the 1930s, several multi-story residential buildings were built on the embankment, including a complex of residential buildings repeating those built shortly before according to the design of the architect A. G. Mordvinov on Bolshaya Kaluzhskaya Street (now part of Leninsky Prospekt). In 1936-1937, the river banks were faced with granite.

In 1950, a plan for the reconstruction of the embankment was approved, developed by architects Ya. V. Belopolsky, E. N. Stamo and N. Ya. Ulas. According to this plan, the embankment was widened to 50 metres and divided into six blocks, including buildings built in 1935-1940. It was planned to build 40 large multi-story buildings, seven schools, sports grounds, and landscaping on the embankment. The houses were to be mainly 10-14 stories high, since the embankment is located between the high-rise building of the University on Lenin Hills and the new high-rise buildings in the Garden Ring. As a result of this plan, the embankment was built up with Stalinist buildings. In 1956, a trolleybus was built along the embankment.
