= Main Military-Political Directorate of the Russian Armed Forces =

Main Military-Political Directorate of the Armed Forces of the Russian Federation
- Emblem of the directorate
- Founded: 30 July 2018
- Country: Russian Federation
- Branch: Ministry of Defense
- Part of: Russian Armed Forces
- Headquarters: House number 8/1, Bolshoi Znamensky lane, Sokolniki District, Moscow

Commanders
- Current commander: General Viktor Goremykin

The Main Military-Political Directorate of the Armed Forces of the Russian Federation (GVPU VS RF) (Russian: Главное военно-политическое управление Вооружённых сил Российской Федерации (ГВПУ ВС РФ)) is the central military-political organization of the Russian Armed Forces, responsible for instilling ideological loyalty to the ruling government within the military. A revival of the Soviet Main Political Directorate, it is informally referred to as GlavPuR (ГлавПУР), the Russian abbreviation for the latter.

== History ==
The GVPU was established by a decree of President Vladimir Putin on 30 July 2018 and Colonel General Andrey Kartapolov appointed its head. Unlike the other main directorates, the head of the GVPU is one of the deputy minister of defense positions. The first reports on its creation appeared in the media in February of that year, citing Ministry of Defense sources who stated that it would be organized from the Main Directorate for Work with Personnel, the successor of the Main Military-Political Directorate of the Soviet Army and Soviet Navy, disbanded after the August coup in 1991 when Communist Party influence was removed from the Armed Forces. Thus, Aleksandr Kanshin, deputy chairman of the Public Council of the Ministry of Defense, noted that "in the context of a global information and psychological confrontation, the role of the moral and political unity of the army and society increases immeasurably," for which "a radical restructuring and significant strengthening of the entire organization of the Armed Forces is necessary, which will organize, conduct and be responsible for the moral and ideological component in the Russian Army." According to media reports, the idea of recreating the Political Directorate was promoted by Defense Minister Sergei Shoigu. The revival of the directorate was framed as part of confrontation with the West by Russian authorities, with Viktor Bondarev describing it as "important for ensuring national security" in response to a putative campaign by "Western enemies to discredit the image of Russia and the Russian Army."

== Responsibilities ==
Officially, the GVPU organizes military-political work in the Armed Forces, carrying out the Ministry of Defense objective of developing and implementing measures aimed at publicizing the activities of the Armed Forces, increasing the societal authority and prestige of military service, and the preservation and enhancement of patriotic traditions. The directorate absorbed the Main Directorate for Work with Personnel, which became a directorate within the GVPU, taking over responsibility for Yunarmiya and "patriotic education," the Department of Culture and the Press Service of the Ministry of Defense, as well as the release of Armed Forces media. In the press, the emergence of the GVPU was regarded as a return to the Soviet practice of political commissars who engaged in political propaganda within the Armed Forces. Nevertheless, retired general Leonid Ivashov noted that “now without a powerful scheme of political education and ideological education, it is impossible to build an army,” since “Russia’s opponents have appeared in the West," and Russian state media directly stated that “Russia has nothing to be ashamed of” and “by the decision to create a new old structure, Russia openly declares that it is participating in a global military-geopolitical confrontation."

== Leadership ==
- Colonel General Andrey Kartapolov (30 July 2018 – 5 October 2021)
- Major General Viktor Miskovets (acting 5 October – 12 November 2021)
- Colonel General Gennady Zhidko (12 November 2021 – 28 July 2022)
- General of the Army Viktor Goremykin (28 July 2022 – present)
