= Tatiana Shevtsova =

Russian deputy minister of defence

- Татьяна Шевцова
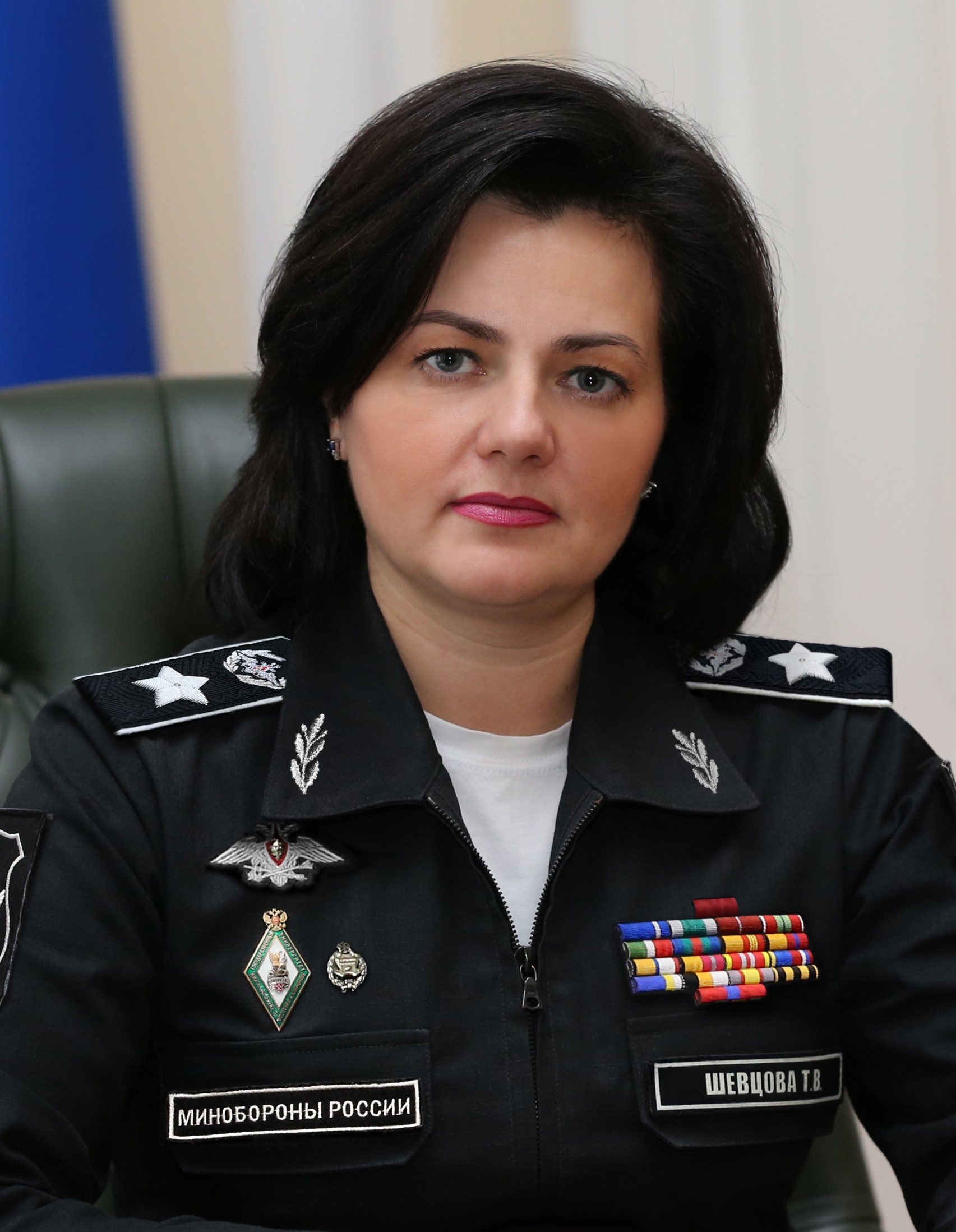
- Shevtsova in 2013
- Born: 22 July 1969 (age 57); Kozelsk, Russian SFSR, USSR
- Military career
- Allegiance: Soviet Union; Russia
- Branch: Armed Forces of the Russian Federation
- Service years: 1991—2024
- Rank: Class 1 Active State Advisor of the Russian Federation
- Awards: Order of Honour

Tatiana Viktorovna Shevtsova (Russian: Татьяна Викторовна Шевцова; born 22 July 1969) is a former Russian Deputy Minister of Defence and Order of Honour recipient.

She has the federal state civilian service rank of 1st class Active State Councillor of the Russian Federation.

== Early life and education ==
Shevtsova was born in 1969 in Kozelsk, USSR. She attended and later graduated from Leningrad Institute of Finance and Economics in 1991.

== Career ==
From 1991 Shevtsova worked as a tax collector for the Federal Tax Service of the Russian Federation.

From November 2006 until May 2010, Shevtsova was the deputy head of the FNS.

On 4 August 2010 Shevtsova was appointed as Deputy Minister of Defence of the Russian Federation, with responsibility for MOD finances, under a Presidential Decree.

Journal Forbes included her to the list of the top richest siloviki of Russia (13th place in 2013).

In June 2024 Shevtsova was reported to have resigned in the great purge of Defense Ministry officials after Putin's fifth inauguration.

=== Sanctions ===
She was sanctioned by the UK government in 2022 in relation to the Russo-Ukrainian War.

She was also sanctioned by New Zealand in relation to the 2022 Russian invasion of Ukraine.
