= Arkady Bakhin =

Russian military officer (born 1956)

General of the Army Arkady Bakhin
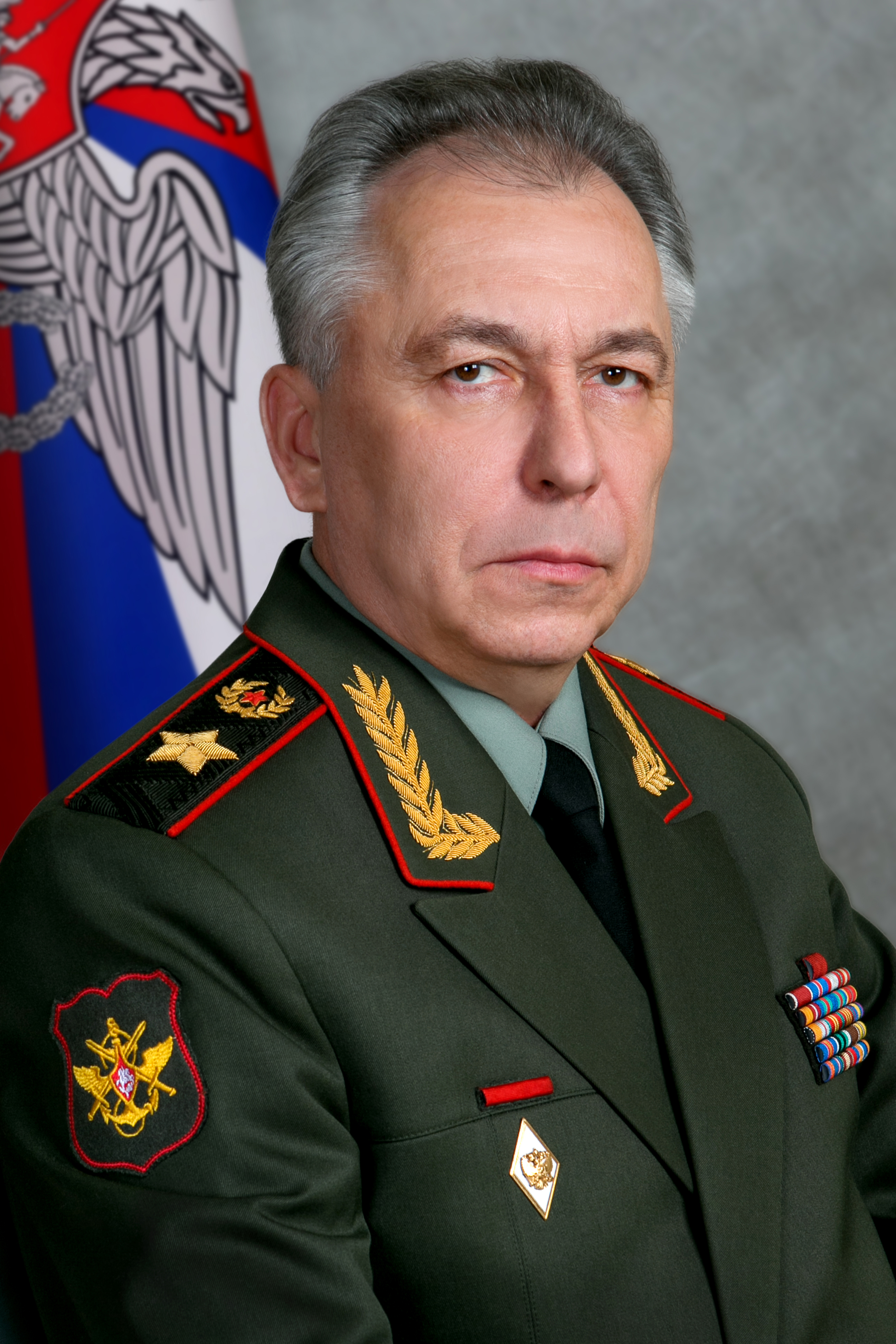
- Bakhin in 2013
- Born: 8 May 1956 (age 70); Kaunas, Lithuanian SSR
- Military career
- Allegiance: Soviet Union; Russia
- Branch: Armed Forces of the Russian Federation
- Service years: 1973–2015
- Rank: General of the Army
- Commands: Western Military District
- Awards: Order of Courage; Order of Military Merit

Arkady Viktorovich Bakhin (Russian: Аркадий Викторович Бахин) is a retired military officer of the Russian Federation with the rank of General of the Army.

== Biography ==
Bakhin was born 8 May 1956 in Kaunas, Lithuanian SSR. He graduated from the Moscow Higher Command School named after the Supreme Soviet of the RSFSR (1973–1977), Frunze Academy (1984–1987), Military Academy of the General Staff of Armed Forces (1995–1997).

He served as a platoon leader, company, battalion chief of staff of the Southern group of troops and the Kiev Military District (1977–1984), commander of the infantry battalion, regiment chief of staff, commander of the school rifle regiment (1987–1992), and commander of the infantry regiment in the 85th Motor Rifle Division, a brigade commander in the Siberian Military District (1992–1995), commander of the 102nd Military Base in Gyumri, Armenia, the commander of the 42nd Motor Rifle Division in the North Caucasus Military District (1997–2000), Chief of Staff of the Group of Russian Troops in Transcaucasia (2000–2002), Deputy Commander of the North Caucasus Military District (2002–2004), commander of the 41st Army (2004–01.2006), Deputy Commander of the Siberian Military District (01.2006–09.07.2007), serving as Makarov's deputy, Chief of Staff of the Siberian military district (09.07.2007–03.12.2008), commander of the Volga-Urals Military District (03.12 .2008–09.07.2010).

On 9 July 2010 by order of the Minister of Defence, Bakhin was named to the position of interim commander of the Western Military District.

He was promoted to Colonel-General in 2010.

He was awarded the Order of Merit for the Fatherland IV degree of Military Merit, Courage, medals.

On 17 November 2015, General Bakhin was dismissed from his post and retired from military service by President Vladimir Putin. No explanation for his removal was given.

He has since served as a senior director at the state corporation Rosatom, where he oversees the production of all conventional (non-nuclear) weapons.

=== Sanctions ===
He was sanctioned by the UK government in 2015 in relation to the Russo-Ukrainian War.

== Honours and awards ==
=== Soviet Union ===
- Jubilee Medal "60 Years of the Armed Forces of the USSR"
- Jubilee Medal "70 Years of the Armed Forces of the USSR"
- Medal "For Impeccable Service" 2nd and 3rd classes

=== Russian Federation ===
- Order of Courage
- Order of Military Merit
- Medal "For Military Valour" 1st class (Min Def)
- Medal "200 Years of the Ministry of Defence" (Min Def)
- Two Medals "For Strengthening Military Cooperation" (Min Def)
- Medal "For Strengthening Military Cooperation" (FSB)
- Medal "For Strengthening Military Cooperation" (MVD)
- Medal "For Distinguished Military Service" 1st class (Min Def)
