= Special Communications Service of Russia =

Russian intelligence agency

Special Communications Service
- Спецсвязь России

Agency overview
- Formed: March 11, 2003; 23 years ago
- Preceding agency: FAPSI
- Jurisdiction: Russia
- Headquarters: Moscow, Russia
- Employees: Classified
- Annual budget: Classified
- Agency executive: Vasily Zaplatkin, Director
- Parent agency: FSO
- Website: Official page

The Special Communications and Information Service of the Federal Protective Service of the Russian Federation (Spetssvyaz, Spetssvyaz; Russian: Служба специальной связи и информации, Спецсвязь России) is a cryptologic intelligence agency of The Federal Protective Service of Russia responsible for the collection and analysis of foreign communications and foreign signals intelligence, as well as protecting Russian government communications and information systems, which involves information security and cryptanalysis/cryptography.

== History ==
The Service was established on March 11, 2003, as the successor of FAPSI that was created from the 8th Main Directorate (Government Communications) and 16th Directorate (Electronic Intelligence) of the KGB.

On September 25, 1991, following the August Coup, Soviet president Mikhail Gorbachev dismantled the KGB into several independent departments. One of them became the Committee on Government Communications under the President of the Soviet Union.

On December 24, 1991, after the disbanding of the Soviet Union the organization became the Federal Agency of Government Communications and Information under the President of the Russian Federation.

On March 11, 2003, the agency was reorganized into the Service of Special Communications and Information (Spetssviaz) of the Federal Security Service (FSB). On August 7, 2004, Spetssviaz was incorporated as a structural sub unit of the Federal Protective Service (FSO).

The service was created as a result of the reform March 11, 2003, on the basis of the Federal Agency for Government Communications and Information (FAPSI), initially as a special communication service of the FSO.

According to the direction then the "Regulations on the Service for Special Communications and Information under the Federal Service of the Russian Federation", the Service of Special Communication and Information (Special Communication of Russia) is a federal special communication and information, exercising their powers within the organization and provision of service, security, development and improving the governmental systems and other kinds of special links, and information gathering for federal government agencies, public authorities of the Russian Federation and state bodies.

On August 7, 2004, Vladimir Putin signed a decree "On the Federal Service of the Russian Federation". According to the decree, The Service become a part of the FSO.

The 16th Centre (or Military Unit 71330), which inherited from FAPSI and is the FSB's main structural unit for signals intelligence, consists of a central unit housed in unmarked administrative buildings in many different locations across Moscow and secluded forest enclosures, with satellite dishes several metres in diameter facing in different directions. Located mainly along Russia's borders are signals intelligence facilities, also referred to as information reception centres, which is a direct reference to their main function. The 16th Centre's signals intelligence facilities closest to Estonia are in Krasnoye Selo (Leningrad Oblast), Verbnoye (Kaliningrad Oblast) and Neyolovo (Pskov Oblast). The last one is only 25 kilometres from the Estonian border.

== Directors of Spetssviaz ==
From 2003 until 2010, the Spetssviaz Director was Yuri Korneev. The Director of the Special Communications Service is the deputy director of the Russian Federal Protective Service.

- Yuri Kornev (2003–2010)
- Alexey Mironov (2011–2017)
- Vladimir Belanovskiy (2017–2021)
- Vasily Zaplatkin (Since 2021)

== See also ==
- NSA
- FAPSI
- Federal Protective Service of Russia
- Ministry of Communications and Mass Media
