= Nikolay Nikolaevich Andreev =

Soviet and Russian scientist

Nikolay Nikolaevich Andreev Николай Николаевич Андреев
- Born: 31 January 1929; Moscow
- Died: 26 December 2006 (aged 77); Moscow
- Education: Moscow Power Engineering Institute
- Scientific career
- Fields: Cryptography

Nikolay Nikolaevich Andreev (Russian: Николай Николаевич Андреев; 31 January 1929 – 26 December 2006) was a Soviet and Russian scientist in the field of cryptography.

== Biography ==
He was born in 1929 in Moscow.

In 1951 he graduated from the Moscow Power Engineering Institute. Immediately after graduation he went to work in the KGB of the USSR. In 1953 he graduated from the Higher School of Cryptographers of the Main Directorate of the Special Service (GUSS) under the CPSU Central Committee.

He made great contributions to the information security of the USSR and to the development of cryptographic science and cryptographic service. He was one of the founders of engineering cryptography (electronic cryptanalysis), and a participant in the decoding of dozens of foreign ciphers.

From 1975 to 1991 Andreev was the head of the 8th Main Directorate of the KGB. The department dealt with the protection of technical means of communication and the creation of ciphers.

After the collapse of the USSR, Andreev was one of the initiators of the creation of the Russian intelligence agency FAPSI. Since 1991 - First Deputy Director General of FAPSI under the President of the Russian Federation. He resigned from service in 1994.

From 1992 to 1998, he was president of the Academy of Cryptography of the Russian Federation. Andreev was also the author of a large number of scientific papers and publications, almost all of which are not subject to open publication. He was awarded orders and medals of the USSR and the Russian Federation.

Laureate of the Lenin Prize. Laureate of the State Prize of the USSR.

== Literature ==
- Encyclopedia of the secret services of Russia. Moscow: Astrel, 2004.
