= Vladimir Matyukhin =

Russian army general (1945–2026)

- Владимир Матюхин
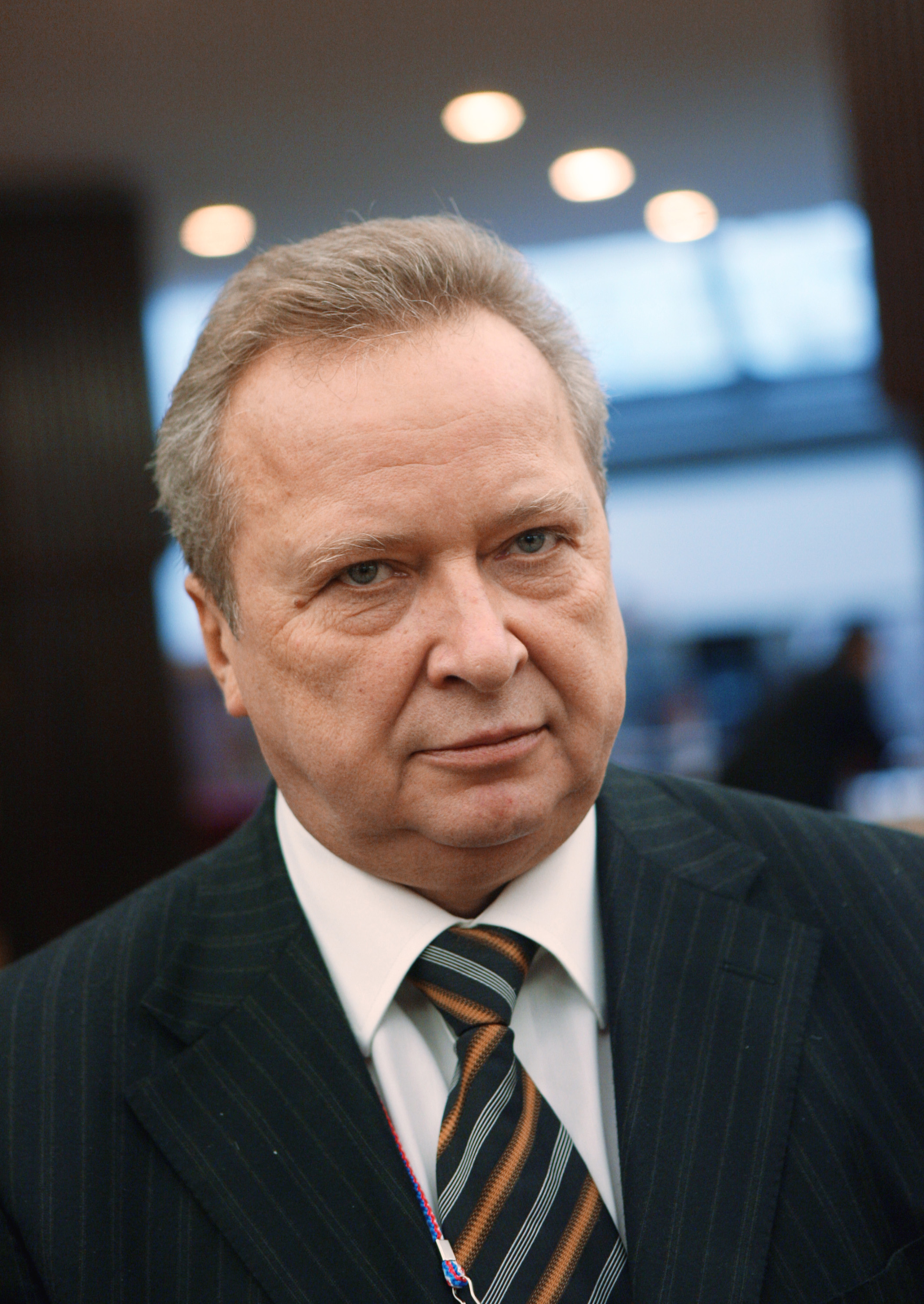
- Matyukhin in 2006
- Born: 4 February 1945; Moscow, Russian SFSR, Soviet Union
- Died: 27 May 2026 (aged 81); Moscow, Russia
- Burial place: Federal Military Memorial Cemetery
- Education: Moscow Power Engineering Institute; KGB Dzerzhinsky Higher School
- Military career
- Allegiance: Soviet Union; Russia
- Branch: KGB, FAPSI, Armed Forces of the Russian Federation
- Service years: 1969–2004
- Rank: Army general

Vladimir Georgiyevich Matyukhin (Russian: Владимир Георгиевич Матюхин; 4 February 1945 – 27 May 2026) was a Russian general.

== Biography ==
Matyukhin was born on 4 February 1945. After graduating from high school, from 1962 to 1964, he worked as a laboratory assistant at the Department of Theoretical Physics at the Moscow State Pedagogical University, equipment adjuster at the Moscow Electric Lamp Plant. In 1964 he entered the Moscow Energy Institute, graduating in 1968, and worked as an engineer at the Joint Design Bureau of the same institute.

From 1969 he served in the KGB of the USSR. He served in the 8th Main Directorate of the KGB of the USSR (encryption and decryption, it was also responsible for government communications), beginning his service as an engineer. Simultaneously with his service, he received additional education: in 1973 he graduated from the Faculty of Mechanics and Mathematics of the Moscow State University and in 1983 graduate school at the Dzerzhinsky Higher School of the KGB.

When, after the collapse of the USSR in December 1991, the Federal Agency for Government Communications and Information under the President of the Russian Federation (FAPSI) was separated from the KGB, among other intelligence services, Matyukhin joined FAPSI and was appointed head of the Research Center of the Main Security Directorate FAPSI communications. From 1993 he served as Deputy General Director of FAPSI.

On 31 May 1999, by decree of the President of the Russian Federation Yeltsin, he was appointed General Director of FAPSI. Colonel General V. G. Matyukhin became the third and last head of FAPSI.

From January 2001, he served as Director General of FAPSI, he was a member of the Operational Headquarters for managing counter-terrorism actions in the North Caucasus region, created by decree of the President of the Russian Federation. He was a member of the Security Council of the Russian Federation (from 14 June 1999 to 21 June 2003). Since 13 June 2000, member of the Russian Government Commission on Military-Industrial Issues. Since November 2000 – Chairman of the Coordination Council for ensuring the security of encryption tools and their operation in government and closed communications systems of the CIS member states.

On 11 March 2003, President of the Russian Federation Putin signed a number of decrees aimed at reforming government bodies in Russia. In particular, FAPSI was abolished, its functions were distributed between the Federal Security Service of the Russian Federation, the Foreign Intelligence Service of the Russian Federation and the Federal Protective Service of the Russian Federation. On the same day, Vladimir Matyukhin was appointed chairman of the State Committee of the Russian Federation for State Defense Orders under the Ministry of Defense of the Russian Federation and First Deputy Minister of Defense of the Russian Federation. On the same day, 11 March 2003, by decree No. 305 of the President of Russia, Matyukhin was awarded the military rank of army general.

In April 2004, the State Committee for Defense Orders was transformed into the Federal Service for Defence Contracts of the Russian Federation under the Ministry of Defense of the Russian Federation. However, Matyukhin was not placed at the head of the new service, but was appointed First Deputy Minister of Defense of the Russian Federation. He worked in this position for less than a month and was discharged from military service in May 2004.

From 8 June 2004 to 2010 he served as Director of the Federal Agency for Information Technologies of the Russian Federation (Rosinformtekhnologii). On 26 January 2010, Prime Minister Vladimir Putin signed a governmental decree releasing Matyukhin from his post “due to reaching the age limit” for holding it.

From 16 December 2010, he was the First Deputy General Director and Scientific Director of the Research and Design Institute of Information, Automation and Communications in Railway Transport (JSC NIIAS).

He was also a Doctor of Technical Sciences, a full member of the Russian Academy of Cryptography, the Russian Academy of Engineering Sciences and the International Academy of Communications. Laureate of the State Prize of the Russian Federation. For his great contribution to the development of information technology and the implementation of state policy in the field of informatization, he was awarded a Certificate of Honor from the Government of the Russian Federation, and received letters of gratitude from the President of the Russian Federation, the Chairman of the Federation Council of the Federal Assembly of the Russian Federation and the Government of the Russian Federation. Author of more than 150 scientific papers and four inventions. Matyukhin was married and had a son. He died on May 27, 2026, at the age of 81.
