= Aleksandr Starovoitov =

Soviet and Russian military officer (1940–2021)

- Александр Владимирович Старовойтов
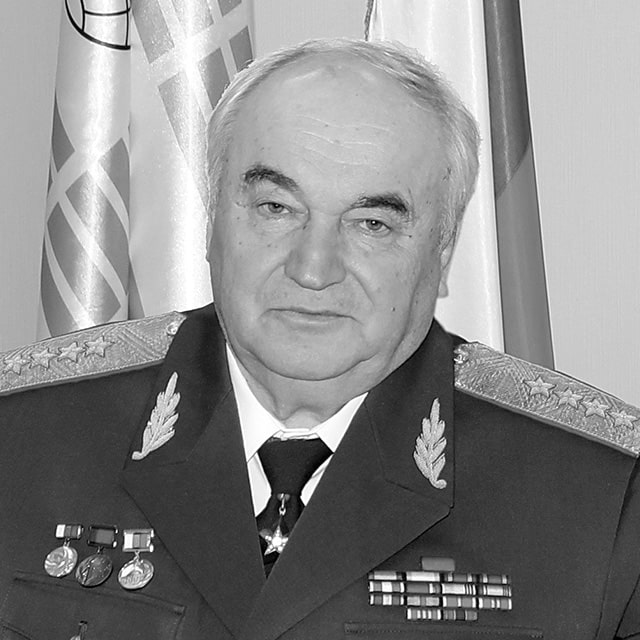
- Born: 18 October 1940; Balashov, Saratov Oblast, Russian SFSR, Soviet Union
- Died: 17 July 2021 (aged 80); Moscow, Russia
- Burial place: Troyekurovskoye Cemetery
- Military career
- Allegiance: USSR; Russia
- Service years: 1986–1999
- Rank: Army General
- Commands: Federal Agency of Government Communications and Information
- Awards: Hero of the Russian Federation; Order "For Merit to the Fatherland" Third and Fourth Classes; Order of Alexander Nevsky; Order of the Red Banner of Labour; Order of the Badge of Honour; Medal "Veteran of Labour"; State Prize of the Russian Federation

Aleksandr Vladimirovich Starovoitov (Russian: Александр Владимирович Старовойтов; 18 October 1940 – 17 July 2021) was an officer of the Soviet and Russian security services and academic, specialising in communications technologies. He reached the rank of army general, and was awarded the title of Hero of the Russian Federation.

Starovoitov's education and early career was spent specialising in electronics and communications, and after obtaining qualifications and practical experience in this area, he began research work at the Penza Scientific Electrotechnical Research Institute. Over the years he rose to head the institute, and became general director of the "Krystal" Research and Production Association, working under the Ministry of Communication Equipment Industry. During this time he oversaw the development of information security systems which were employed in the Soviet Armed Forces, governmental departments and organs, and in economic and financial institutions. By the late 1980s he had become a leading expert in the field of communications research and development, and in 1986 he was appointed deputy head for technological equipment of the KGB's Government Communications Department. He was briefly chairman of the Government Communications Committee prior to the dissolution of the Soviet Union, and then became general director of FAPSI, the Federal Agency of Government Communications and Information.

Under Starovoitov's leadership FAPSI became one of the largest intelligence agencies in the Russian Federation, and he rose through the ranks to become an army general. Dismissed from his post in 1998, he retired in 1999, being awarded the title of Hero of the Russian Federation that year. He remained active in commercial fields related to his service, in senior leadership positions in businesses and enterprises, as well as in research and academia. He was a member of numerous scientific bodies and academies, and had received a number of academic and governmental distinctions prior to his death in 2021.

== Early life and career ==
Starovoitov was born on 18 October 1940 into a Russian family in the town of Balashov, Saratov Oblast, in the Russian Soviet Federal Socialist Republic, in the Soviet Union. He moved with his family, which had military connections, to Kamenka, Penza Oblast in 1952. He studied at the faculty of encryption and coding technology at Penza Polytechnic Institute, graduating in 1962 with a degree in electromechanical communication equipment, and the qualification of an electrical engineer. He began his career as an engineer at the Kalugapribor plant, working as a senior tuning engineer and the deputy head of workshop number 8. After three years practical technical experience, in 1965 Starovoitov joined the Penza Scientific Electrotechnical Research Institute as a senior engineer and laboratory chief. In 1976 he became head of the research department and deputy director for scientific work, and in 1982 he was appointed director of the institute, and first deputy general director of science at the "Krystal" Research and Production Association of the Ministry of Communication Equipment Industry.

In 1983 Starovoitov was appointed general director of the "Krystal" Research and Production Association, a post he continued to hold alongside his position as director of the Penza Scientific Electrotechnical Research Institute. Over the next three years, until 1986, he oversaw the development of information security systems which were employed in the Soviet Armed Forces, governmental departments and organs, and in economic and financial institutions. He was also involved in developing automated control systems. Starovoitov received the Order of the Badge of Honour in 1981 for the scientific development and organisation of large-scale production of special communications equipment, and in 1986 received the Order of the Red Banner of Labour for "the creation and organisation of the serial production of data transmission services for frontline automated control systems".

== With the KGB and FAPSI ==
The coat of arms of FAPSI, the Federal Agency of Government Communications and Information. Starovoitov served as the agency's head between 1991 and 1998.

By now having successfully combined an academic career with development and production work, and having become a leading expert in the field of communications technology, in May 1986 Starovoitov was called up for military service. He was granted the rank of major general, having previously been a lieutenant colonel in the KGB reserve. He was appointed deputy head for technological equipment of the KGB's Government Communications Department, serving in the KGB's central offices. During his five years in the post, he oversaw the roll out of modern communications systems throughout government departments. He was promoted to lieutenant general on 11 April 1991, and in September 1991 he was appointed chairman of the Government Communications Committee, a post he held through the last months of the Soviet Union. On 24 December 1991 Starovoitov was appointed general director of FAPSI, the Federal Agency of Government Communications and Information. Under his leadership FAPSI became one of the largest intelligence agencies in the Russian Federation.

Promoted to colonel general on 12 February 1993, Starovoitov continued to develop his skills, and in 1997 graduated from the Military Academy of the General Staff of the Armed Forces of Russia with a degree in defence and security. He had connections with leading businesses and enterprises involved in telecommunications, sitting on the board of directors of Rostelecom and Svyazinvest, and was chairman of the Security Council of Russia's Interdepartmental Commission on Information Security, as well as chairman of the Commonwealth of Independent States's coordinating council on communications and encryption security. On 23 February 1998 he was promoted to army general.

== Retirement and later life ==
Starovoitov was dismissed as director of FAPSI on 7 December 1998, ostensibly to allow his transfer to another position. No such transfer occurred, and he was dismissed from military service in 1999. No longer in government service, he returned to research and development on communication systems. On 17 August 1999 he was awarded the title of Hero of the Russian Federation. The award, made by decree of the President of Russia, was closed, but the reason was speculated to be because of his work on the State Automated System "Elections".

Starovoitov continued to work in commercial fields related to his expertise. Between 2003 and 2006 he was general director of Tech-Inform Consulting, and in 2006 he became director, and then in 2012 president, of the Centre for Information Technologies and Executive Authority Systems at the Federal State Autonomous Scientific Institution. Also in 2006 he became general director of the International Centre for Informatics and Electronics, working in the fields of military and special weapons equipment. His academic work brought him the title of professor, and doctor of technical sciences. He authored over 170 scientific works, including 8 monographs, and held 48 patents. He was also chairman of the National Committee for the Promotion of Economic Cooperation with Latin American Countries (NC SESLA), and in 2009 was appointed chairman of the Russia-Chile Business Council.

Starovoitov was married to Tatiana (born 6 September 1939), and had a son, Dmitry, a candidate of physical and mathematical sciences, who died in 1999. Starovoitov lived and worked in Moscow, dying there on 17 July 2021 at the age of 80. Prime Minister of Russia Mikhail Mishustin expressed his condolences, stating that Starovoitov had "made a huge contribution to the development of national science and contributed to the strengthening of the country's defence capability." Starovoitov was buried in the fourth section of the Troyekurovskoye Cemetery.

== Honours and awards ==
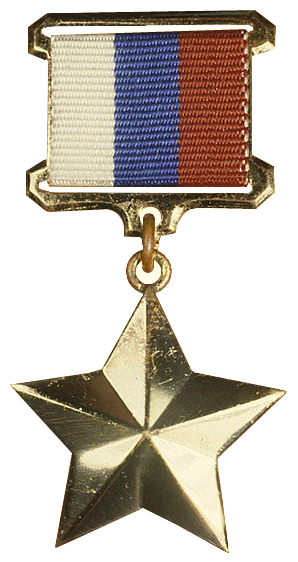
The gold star medal of the title of Hero of the Russian Federation. Starovoitov was awarded the title in 1999.

Besides the title of Hero of the Russian Federation, Starovoitov had received numerous awards and honours over his long career. He was awarded the Order "For Merit to the Fatherland" Fourth Class on 9 April 1996, and the Third Class in 2020. He had also received the Order of Alexander Nevsky on 11 June 2016, and the Soviet-era awards of the Order of the Red Banner of Labour on 8 August 1986, and the Order of the Badge of Honour on 10 March 1981. He also held several professional awards and distinctions, including the titles of Honoured Scientific and Technical Worker of the RSFSR on 21 October 1993, Honoured State Security Officer in 1991, Honoured Communications Industry Worker, and Honoured Radio Operator. He had also been awarded the thanks of the President of Russia on 12 July 1996.

Among Starovoitov's academic distinctions was that of a laureate of the State Prize of the Russian Federation in 1995 for the development of government communication systems, and two prizes of the government of the Russian Federation; in 2008 for the development of special information systems, and in 2013 for his technical and academic work. He was an academician of the Academy of Cryptography of the Russian Federation, academician and first vice president of the A. M. Prokhorov Academy of Engineering Sciences, and academician of the Russian Academy of Military Sciences, the Russian Academy of Electrical Sciences, the Russian Academy of Natural Sciences, and the International Academy of Communications. He was also a board member of the Russian Military-Industrial Commission's Scientific and Technical Council, and a member of the Russian Academy of Sciences's Defence Research Council. He had received the Russian Academy of Sciences's Popov Medal in 2020 for his works on the "Creation of scientific foundations and development of design methods and software and hardware implementation of promising information transmission systems".

== See also ==
- List of Heroes of the Russian Federation
