= FAPSI =

Russian signals intelligence agency

Federal Agency of Government Communications and Information
- Федеральное Агентство Правительственной Связи и Информации
- Emblem of FAPSI

- Flag of Federal agency of the governmental communication and the information

Agency overview
- Formed: December 24, 1991; 34 years ago
- Preceding agency: 8th Main Directorate, 16th Directorate of the KGB of the USSR
- Dissolved: March 11, 2003; 23 years ago
- Superseding agency: Spetssviaz
- Jurisdiction: Russia
- Headquarters: Moscow, Russia
- Employees: Classified
- Annual budget: Classified
- Agency executive: Vladimir Matyukhin (1999–2003), General Director (last)
- Parent agency: The Kremlin Staff
- Website: Official page at the Wayback Machine (archive index) (not active)

FAPSI (Russian: ФАПСИ) or Federal Agency of Government Communications and Information (FAGCI) (Russian: Федеральное Агентство Правительственной Связи и Информации) was a Russian government agency, which was responsible for signal intelligence and security of governmental communications.

The present-day FAPSI successor agencies are the relevant departments of the Federal Security Service (FSB) and Foreign Intelligence Service (SVR) as well as the Special Communications Service of Russia (Spetssvyaz) (part of the Federal Protective Service of the Russian Federation) (FSO RF).

== History ==
=== Creation ===
FAPSI was created from the 8th Main Directorate (Government Communications) and 16th Directorate (Electronic Intelligence) of the KGB. It is the equivalent to the USA National Security Agency. On September 25, 1991, Soviet president Mikhail Gorbachev dismantled the KGB into several independent departments. One of them became the Committee on Government Communications under the President of Soviet Union. On December 24, 1991 after the disbanding of the Soviet Union the organization became the Federal Agency of Government Communications and Information under the President of Russian Federation.

=== Dissolution ===
On March 11, 2003 the agency was reorganized into the Service of Special Communications and Information (Spetssvyaz, Spetssviaz) (Russian: Служба специальной связи и информации) of the Federal Security Service of the Russian Federation (FSB RF). On August 7, 2004, Spetssviaz was incorporated as a structural sub unit of the Federal Protective Service of the Russian Federation (FSO RF).

== Structure ==
According to the press, the structure of FAPSI copied the structure of the US National Security Agency, it includes:

- Chief R&D Directorate (Главное научно-техническое управление)
- Chief directorate of government communications
- Chief directorate of security of communications
- Chief directorate of information technology (Главное управление информационных систем)
- Special troops of FAPSI
- Academy of Cryptography
- Military School of FAPSI in Voronezh, sometimes referred as the world largest hacker's school
- Military school of communications in Orel
- Moscow Department of Penza Scientific Research Electrotechnics Institute (МО ПНИЭИ), manufacturer of software and hardware used by the above agencies

== Chiefs ==
=== 16th Directorate of the KGB ===
- Nikolai Nikolaevich Andreev (1968–1973)
- Major-General Igor Vasilievich Maslov (1973–?)

=== Committee on Government Communications under President of Soviet Union ===
- General Aleksandr Vladimirovich Starovoitov (1991)

=== Federal Agency of Government Communications and Information ===
- General Aleksandr Vladimirovich Starovoitov (1991–1998)
- Vladislav Petrovich Sherstyuk (1998–1999) – former chief of Radio-electronics intelligence department of the agency
- Vladimir Georgievich Matyukhin (1999–2003) – a civilian specialist on cryptography and data protection

=== Service of Special Communications and Information (FAPSI successor) ===
- Yuri P. Kornev (2003–2010)
- Aleksey Mironov (since 2010)

== FAPSI and the Internet ==
FAPSI was always interested in monitoring of Internet activities.

In 1994 it bought major Russian internet provider of that time RELCOM. According to their explanation they were not interested in interception of the network traffic, but in Internet experience of the firm and in utilization of "FAPSI's excess computing power and network bandwidth".

In 1995 by decree of President Boris Yeltsin all cryptographic systems except those licensed by FAPSI were forbidden in the Russian Federation. There are widespread rumors that all systems licensed by FAPSI have backdoors allowing the agency to freely access the encrypted information.

Since 1998 they require that all Internet providers in Russia install their hardware named SORM (СОРМ – Система Оперативно-Розыскных Мероприятий, System of Operative Investigative Actions) that allows filtering and remote control of internet traffic from FAPSI headquarters. Internet providers must pay for the devices (around US$15,000) directly to FAPSI. Despite the original resistance of Internet providers they complied. It is claimed, however, that no legal document requires ISPs to provide these services free of charge, and some people report that one large St. Petersburg ISP told FSB that it does not decline their request, but is going to bill them appropriately, for which this ISP never saw FSB come back.

== Mishaps of the agency ==
One of the tasks of the agency was to protect government websites from getting hacked. Sometime they fail to do it by a very simple scenario - the domain is not paid for in time and becomes a trophy of cybersquatting.

In January 2004, the election site registered personally for Vladimir Putin was not paid for in time and became a pornographic site. Eventually the site was closed down.

== See also ==
- Special Communications Service of Russia (Spetssviaz)
- Federal Protective Service (Russia)
- Federal Security Service (Russia)
- National Security Agency (US)
- GCHQ (UK)
- Communications Security Establishment (Canada)
