= Moscow Electric Lamp Plant =

Coordinates: 55°47′14″N 37°42′18″E

- Company type: Open joint-stock company
- Founded: 1907
- Headquarters: Zelenograd, Russia

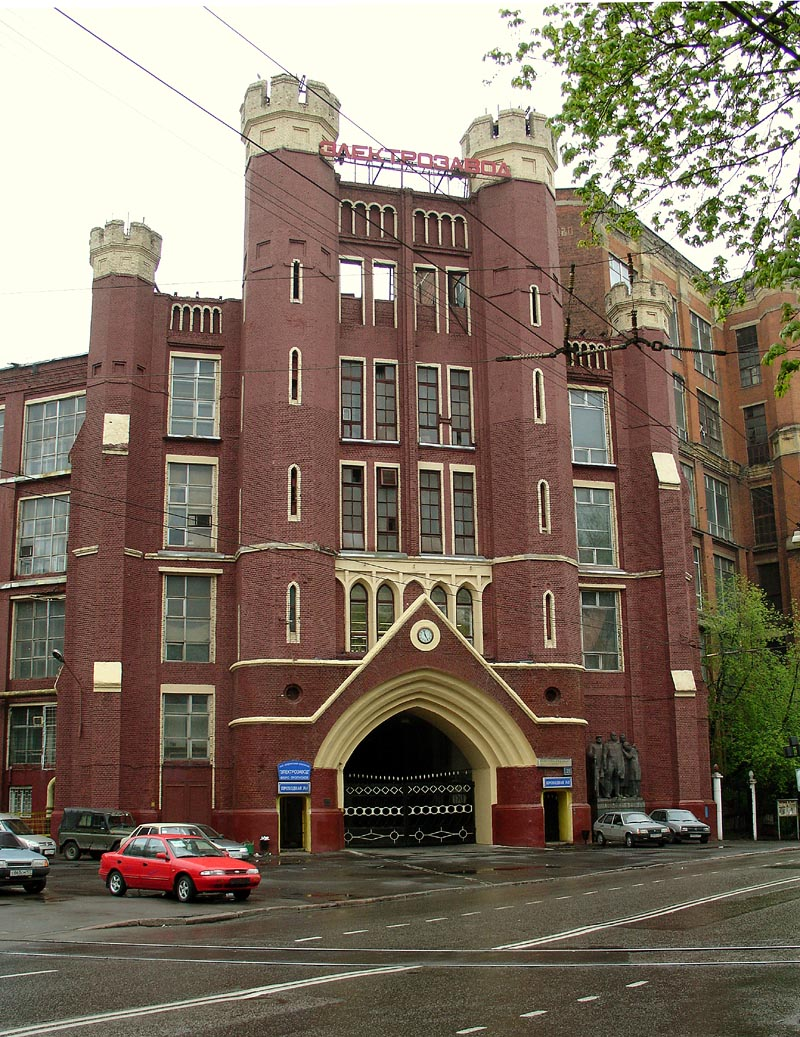
Moscow Electric Lamp Plant

Moscow Electric Lamp Plant (Russian: Московский электроламповый завод) is a company based in Moscow, Russia.

The Moscow Electric Lamp Production Association has been a leader in the development and production of vacuum tubes for both civil and military use. It is a major producer of cathode-ray tubes (CRTs) for color television receivers, and for many years was one of the largest producers in Russia of photoelectronic multiplier tubes (used in light sensing devices). The Association includes three major production facilities: the Moscow Electrovacuum Instrument Plant, which is co-located with the association; the Khromatron Plant, located elsewhere in Moscow; and the Electrovacuum Instrument Plant in Voronezh.

The Moscow Electrovacuum Instrument Plant, with its two associated special design bureaus, specializes in developing and producing a variety of vacuum tube products (photoelectric cells, xenon and mercury tubes, gas-filled and gas discharge devices, photoelectronic multipliers and others). This plant dates back to before World War II, and was known, until 1972, as the Moscow Electric Lamp Plant (MELZ). The Khromatron Plant in Moscow and the Electrovacuum Instrument Plant in Voronezh, produce mainly CRTs for color television.
