= Classified information in Russia =

Government policy

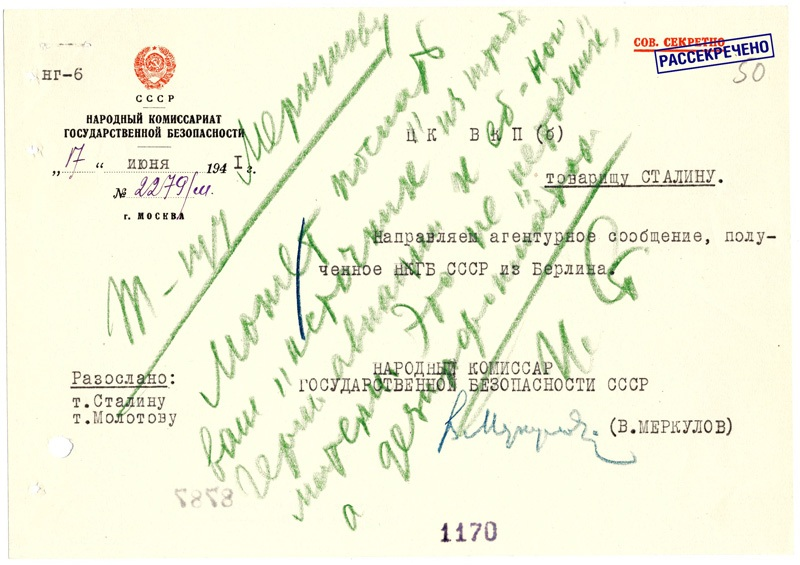
Cover letter of the People's Commissar of State Security of the USSR V. N. Merkulova I. C Stalin № 2279/m dated June 17, 1941 with the attachment of an agent message from Berlin about the completion of preparations by Germany for an attack on the USSR signed by the head of the I Department of the NKGB of the USSR P. Min Fitin of June 16, 1941. The letter contains Stalin's resolution: "Comr. Merkulov. You can send your ‘source’ from the headquarters of the German aviation to the fucking mother. This is not a ‘source’, but a misinformer. I.St.".

In the Russian Federation, a state secret (Russian: Государственная тайна; Gosudarstvennaya Tayna), according to the definition adopted in the Official Secrets Act of the Russian Federation, is information protected by the state on its military, foreign policy, economic, intelligence, counterintelligence, operational and investigative and other activities, dissemination of which could harm state security.

== Protection of State Secrets in the Russian Federation ==
Legislation of the Russian Federation on State Secrets was based on the Constitution of the Russian Federation, Federal Law "On Security" and "On State Secrets". The list of information constituting state secrets shall be determined by federal law "On State Secrets" (Section II), under which inter-ministerial Commission for the Protection of State Secrets generates a list of information classified as state secrets. It is by discretion that such information by the state imposes restrictions when created or through standardized procedures to protect such information.

Public authorities, whose leaders have the authority to designate information as state secrets, develop, within their competence, detailed lists of information to be classified. Guided by these lists, originators determine the degree of secrecy of information, establish the secrecy of documents developed by them (carriers) and their restrictive measures.

Under the law "On State Secrets" it is forbidden to designate as state secrets and classify information on or about:

- emergencies and disasters that threaten the safety and health of citizens, and their consequences, as well as natural disasters, their official forecasts and consequences;
- state environment, health, sanitation, demography, education, culture, agriculture, and the state of crime;
- privileges, compensations and social safeguards provided by the state to citizens, officials, enterprises, institutions and organizations;
- about violations of human rights and freedoms of man and citizen;
- the amount of gold reserves and government foreign exchange reserves of the Russian Federation;
- the health status of senior officials of the Russian Federation;
- any violations of law by public authorities and their officials.

For most of the 20th century, classification in Russia included topographic maps that are fully unclassified in most other countries. After the collapse of the Soviet Union, maps of scale 1:100,000 and less were declassified, but larger scale maps were still considered a state secret. This caused a number of problems for GIS and navigation software makers, and many foreign tourists relied on war time maps prepared by the Germans (e.g. Caucasus area). Around 2010, the declassification process for maps of larger scale (up to 1:50,000) was started.

== Levels of secrecy ==
Levels of secrecy of documents in the USSR, and still in Russian Federation, from maximum to minimum are:

- ОВ (Совершенно секретно/особой важности or simply Особой важности) en.:Particularly Important, equivalent in US: TOP SECRET
- СС (Совершенно секретно) en.:Completely Secret, equivalent in US: SECRET
- С (Секретно) en.:Secret, equivalent in US: CONFIDENTIAL

Limited access (potentially sensitive), but unclassified information

- ДСП (Для служебного пользования) en.: For Official Use Only, equivalent in US: FOR OFFICIAL USE ONLY (FOUO) or RESTRICTED

ДСП do not belong to the state secret.

Classified documents with special contents are marked:

- Особая папка en.: Special Folder, no equivalent in US
- Литер "К" (used for mobilization documents), en.: Type K, no equivalent in US
- Лично en.: Personal, equivalent in US: PERSONAL

The degree of secrecy of information constituting state secrets, is based upon severity of damage, which may be caused by the public spread of said information. Using secrecy levels for classifying information that is not classified as state secrets is not allowed.

== Declassification of information ==
The grounds for the declassification of information classified as state secrets (i.e. removal of restrictions on their distribution) are:

- compliance with the Russian Federation's international obligations under the open exchange of information constituting a state secret of the Russian Federation;
- change of objective circumstances, which result in further protection of information constituting a state secret being inappropriate.

The term of classification of information constituting state secrets, shall not exceed 30 years. In exceptional cases this period may be extended at the conclusion of the interdepartmental commission on protecting state secrets.

== Limitations ==
Persons with access to information designated "Top Secret" or "special importance", may be limited in their constitutional rights. Such restrictions may be placed only on an individual basis (not broadly) by the state security organs (i.e. SVR, FSB, etc.) and require a specific conclusion about the individual's awareness of information constituting a state secrets.

== Russian officials with access to state secrets of the Russian Federation ==
The following is a list of positions, the persons of which are deemed privy to state secrets approved by Decree of the President of the Russian Federation on January 15, 2010 No. 24-rp. By Decree of the President of the Russian Federation of May 20, 2024 No. 429, the people in these positions are required to give prior notice to the Federal Security Service (FSB) and Foreign Intelligence Service (SVR) before departing the Russian Federation, except for officials who are subject to the state protection according to article 8 of the Federal Law of May 27, 1996 No. 57-FZ

1. Prime Minister of Russia
2. Attorney General of the Russian Federation
3. Head of Presidential Administration
4. Secretary of Russian Security Council
5. First Deputy Prime Minister
6. Deputy Prime Minister
7. Deputy Prime Minister – Minister of Finance of the Russian Federation
8. Deputy Prime Minister – Chief of Staff of the Russian Federation
9. First Deputy Prosecutor General of the Russian Federation – Chairman of the Investigative Committee of the Procuracy of the Russian Federation
10. Federal Minister
11. Chairman of the Central Election Commission of the Russian Federation
12. Chairman of the Accounting Chamber of Russian Federation
13. Chairman of the Central Bank of Russian Federation
14. President of the Russian Academy of Sciences
15. Head (Director) of the Federal Security Service (FSB)
16. Head (Director) of the federal agency
17. Senior official (head of the supreme executive organ of state power) of the Russian Federation
18. Commissioner for Human Rights in the Russian Federation
19. Head of organization with in accordance with federal law the authority to exercise on behalf of the Russian Federation government in the specified area of activity

== Officials with the right information, to designate state secrets to the Russian Federation ==
=== 1994–1997 ===
Order of the President of the Russian Federation from February 11, 1994 No. 73-p "approved list of officials of public authorities, vested with authority to refer information to the state secret:

1. Russian Federation Minister of Atomic Energy
2. Minister of the Russian Federation for Civil Defence, Emergencies and Elimination of Consequences of Natural Disasters
3. Minister for Foreign Economic Relations of the Russian Federation
4. Minister of Internal Affairs of the Russian Federation
5. Minister of Health and Medical Industry of the Russian Federation
6. Minister for Foreign Affairs of the Russian Federation
7. Minister of Science and Technology Policy of the Russian Federation
8. Minister of Defence of the Russian Federation
9. Minister of Environment and Natural Resources of the Russian Federation
10. Minister of Transport of the Russian Federation
11. Minister of Communications of the Russian Federation
12. Minister of Agriculture and Food of the Russian Federation
13. Minister of Fuel and Energy of the Russian Federation
14. Minister of Transport of the Russian Federation
15. Minister of Finance of the Russian Federation
16. Minister of Economy of the Russian Federation
17. Chairman of the State Committee of Russia
18. Chairman Goskomproma Russia
19. Chairman of the State Committee Russia
20. Chairman of Russian State Customs Committee
21. Chairman Roskomnedr
22. Chairman Roskomrezerva
23. Chairman Roskomdragmeta
24. Chairman of the Committee under the President of the Russian Federation for Information Policy
25. Chairman Roskommasha
26. Chairman Rosskommetallurgiya
27. Chairman of Russian State Standard
28. Chairman Roskomhimnefteproma
29. Head Roscartography
30. Director of the FGC Russia
31. Director of the SVR of Russia
32. The Director-General FAPSI
33. Director of the Tax Police Department of the Russian Federation
34. RSA Director General
35. Chairman of the State Technical Commission of Russia
36. Head Guo Russia
37. Head of the Presidential Security Service of the Russian Federation
38. Chairman of the Bank of Russia
39. Commander of Border Troops of the Russian Federation (on the order of the President of the Russian Federation dated 27 June 1994 ? 331-p)
40. The head of Hydromet (including the disposition of the President of the Russian Federation dated 27 June 1994 ? 331-p)
41. Head of the Main Directorate of Special Programs of the President of the Russian Federation (on the order of the President of the Russian Federation on October 24, 1994 ? 537-rp)
42. Head of Presidential Administration of Russian Federation (including the disposition of the President of the Russian Federation on June 6, 1996 ? 290-rp)
43. Minister of Construction of Russian Federation (including the disposition of the President of the Russian Federation dated 21 June 1996 ? 333-rp)
44. Chairman GKVTP Russia (including the order of the President of the Russian Federation dated 21 June 1996 ? 333-rp)

=== 1997–2000 ===
Order of the President of the Russian Federation from May 30, 1997 № 226-rp approved list of officials of public authorities, vested with authority to refer information to the state secret:

1. Russian Federation Minister of Atomic Energy
2. Minister of Foreign Economic Relations and Trade of the Russian Federation (Decree of the President of 23 July 1998 removed it from the list)
3. Minister of Internal Affairs of the Russian Federation
4. Minister of the Russian Federation for Civil Defence, Emergencies and Elimination of Consequences of Natural Disasters
5. Minister of Health of the Russian Federation
6. Minister of the Russian Federation on Land Policy, Construction and Housing and Communal Services (including the disposition of the President of the Russian Federation of 23 July 1998 ? 280-rp, expelled the order of the President of the Russian Federation of January 23, 1999 ? 12-p)
7. Minister for Foreign Affairs of the Russian Federation
8. Minister of Science and Technology of the Russian Federation
9. Minister of Education of the Russian Federation
10. Minister of Defence of the Russian Federation
11. Minister of Natural Resources of the Russian Federation
12. Minister of Industry and Trade of the Russian Federation (including the disposition of the President of the Russian Federation of 23 July 1998 ? 280-rp, expelled the order of the President of the Russian Federation of January 23, 1999 ? 12-p)
13. Minister of Transport of the Russian Federation
14. Minister of Agriculture and Food of the Russian Federation
15. Minister of Fuel and Energy of the Russian Federation
16. Minister of Trade of the Russian Federation (including the disposition of the President of the Russian Federation of January 23, 1999 ? 12-p)
17. Minister of Transport of the Russian Federation
18. Minister of Finance of the Russian Federation
19. Minister of Economy of the Russian Federation
20. Minister of Justice of the Russian Federation (including the disposition of the President of the Russian Federation of January 23, 1999 ? 12-p)
21. Chairman of the State Committee of Russia (ruled out the order of the President of the Russian Federation of 23 July 1998 ? 280-p, re-inserted in order of the President of the Russian Federation on January 23, 1999 ? 12-p)
22. Chairman Goskomrezerv Russia
23. Chairman of the State Construction Committee of Russia (ruled out the order of the President of the Russian Federation of 23 July 1998 ? 280-p, re-inserted in order of the President of the Russian Federation on January 23, 1999 ? 12-p)
24. Chairman of the State Committee of Russia
25. Chairman of the State Committee of Russia
26. Chairman of Russian State Standard (deleted order of the President of the Russian Federation dated 23 July 1998 ? 280-p, re-inserted in order of the President of the Russian Federation on January 23, 1999 ? 12-p)
27. Chairman of Russian State Customs Committee
28. Director of Russian Federal Border Guard Service
29. Russian FSB director
30. Director of the SVR of Russia
31. Head Roscartography (deleted order of the President of the Russian Federation dated 23 July 1998 ? 280-p, re-inserted in order of the President of the Russian Federation on January 23, 1999 ? 12-p)
32. Director of the Russian Tax Police
33. The head of Hydromet (deleted order of the President of the Russian Federation dated 23 July 1998 ? 280-p, re-inserted in order of the President of the Russian Federation on January 23, 1999 ? 12-p)
34. Head of Russian Federal Security Service
35. RSA Director General
36. The Director-General FAPSI
37. Head of Presidential Administration
38. Head of the Main Directorate of Special Programs of the President of the Russian Federation
39. Chairman of the State Technical Commission of Russia

=== 2000–2005 ===
Order of the President of the Russian Federation from January 17, 2000 № 6-pn approved list of officials of public authorities, vested with authority to refer information to the state secret:

1. Russian Federation Minister of Atomic Energy
2. Minister of Internal Affairs of the Russian Federation
3. Minister of the Russian Federation for Civil Defence, Emergencies and Elimination of Consequences of Natural Disasters
4. Minister of Health of the Russian Federation
5. Minister for Foreign Affairs of the Russian Federation
6. Minister of Science and Technology of the Russian Federation (deleted Decree of President of Russian Federation from September 26, 2000 ? 419-rp)
7. Minister of Defence of the Russian Federation
8. Minister of Education of the Russian Federation
9. Minister of Natural Resources of the Russian Federation
10. Minister for Industry, Science and Technology of the Russian Federation (including the disposition of the President of the Russian Federation of 26 September 2000 ? 419-rp)
11. Minister of Transport of the Russian Federation
12. Minister of the Russian Federation for Communications and Informatization
13. Minister of Agriculture of the Russian Federation (including the disposition of the President of the Russian Federation dated 26 September 2000 ? 419-rp)
14. Minister of Agriculture and Food of the Russian Federation (Decree of the President removed the Russian Federation of 26 September 2000 ? 419-rp)
15. Minister of Fuel and Energy of the Russian Federation (deleted Decree of President of Russian Federation from September 26, 2000 ? 419-rp)
16. Minister of Trade of the Russian Federation (deleted decree of President of Russian Federation from September 26, 2000 ? 419-rp)
17. Minister of Transport of the Russian Federation
18. Minister of Finance of the Russian Federation
19. Minister of Economy of the Russian Federation (Decree of the President ruled out the Russian Federation of 26 September 2000 ? 419-rp)
20. Minister of Economic Development and Trade of the Russian Federation (including the disposition of the President of the Russian Federation of 26 September 2000 ? 419-rp)
21. Minister of Energy of the Russian Federation (including the disposition of the President of the Russian Federation dated 26 September 2000 ? 419-rp)
22. Minister of Justice of the Russian Federation
23. Chairman of the State Committee of Russia (ruled out the order of the President of the Russian Federation dated 26 September 2000 ? 419-rp)
24. Chairman of the State Committee of Russia (ruled out the order of the President of the Russian Federation dated 26 September 2000 ? 419-rp)
25. Chairman of Russian State Standard
26. Chairman of Russian State Construction Committee
27. Chairman of Russian State Customs Committee
28. Director of the SVR of Russia
29. Head Roszemkadastra (including the disposition of the President of the Russian Federation dated 26 September 2000 ? 419-rp)
30. Head Roscartography
31. The head of Hydromet
32. Russian FSB director
33. Director of the Federal Tax Police Service of Russia (ruled by a presidential decree of November 25, 2003 ? 1389)
34. Head of Russian Federal Security Service
35. Director of Russian Federal Border Guard Service
36. General Director of PAB (on order of the President of the Russian Federation from September 26, 2000 ? 419-rp)
37. Director General of RACE
38. Director General of Rosaviakosmos
39. Director General of Munitions Agency
40. The Director-General Rossudostroeniya
41. The Director-General Rosrezerva
42. The Director-General FAPSI
43. Head GUSP
44. Chairman of the State Technical Commission of Russia
45. Head of Presidential Administration
46. Chairman of the Bank of Russia
47. Director of GFS Russia (including the order of the President of the Russian Federation dated 19 June 2001 ? 325-rp)
48. CMTC chairman of Russia (including the disposition of the President of the Russian Federation on February 14, 2002 ? 64-p)
49. Chairman of the Federal Drug Control Service of Russia (including a presidential decree of November 25, 2003 ? 1389)

=== Since 2005 ===
Order of the President of the Russian Federation from April 16, 2005 № 151-rp approved list of officials of public authorities (in accordance with Presidential Decree of April 8, 2008 № 460 – government departments and organizations), confers the power to designate information a state secret:

1. Head of Presidential Administration
2. Deputy Prime Minister – Chief of Staff of the Russian Federation Government (including the disposition of the President of the Russian Federation from November 1, 2008 ? 654-rp)
3. Deputy Prime Minister – Minister of Finance of the Russian Federation (including the disposition of the President of the Russian Federation from November 1, 2008 ? 654-rp)
4. Minister of Internal Affairs of the Russian Federation
5. Minister of the Russian Federation for Civil Defence, Emergencies and Elimination of Consequences of Natural Disasters
6. Minister for Foreign Affairs of the Russian Federation
7. Minister of Defence of the Russian Federation
8. Minister of Justice of the Russian Federation
9. Chief of Staff of the Russian Federation – Minister of Russian Federation (Decree of the President ruled out the Russian Federation from November 1, 2008 ? 654-rp)
10. Minister for Health and Social Development of Russian Federation
11. Minister of Education and Science of the Russian Federation
12. Minister of Natural Resources of the Russian Federation in accordance with the decree of the President of the Russian Federation from November 1, 2008 ? 654-p "- Minister of Natural Resources and Environment of the Russian Federation
13. Minister of Industry and Energy of the Russian Federation in accordance with the decree of the President of the Russian Federation from November 1, 2008 ? 654-p, - Minister of Industry and Trade of the Russian Federation
14. Minister of Agriculture of the Russian Federation
15. Minister of Transport of the Russian Federation
16. Minister of Information Technologies and Communication of the Russian Federation in accordance with the decree of the President of the Russian Federation from November 1, 2008 ? 654-p "- Minister of Communications of the Russian Federation
17. Minister of Finance of the Russian Federation (Decree of the President ruled out the Russian Federation from November 1, 2008 ? 654-rp)
18. Minister of Economic Development and Trade of the Russian Federation in accordance with the decree of the President of the Russian Federation from November 1, 2008 ? 654-p "- Minister of Economic Development;
19. Minister of Energy of the Russian Federation (including the disposition of the President of the Russian Federation from November 1, 2008 ? 654-rp)
20. Minister for Regional Development of the Russian Federation (including the disposition of the President of the Russian Federation of 26 July 2008 ? 436-p)
21. Chairman of the Bank of Russia
22. Director of GFS Russia
23. Director of the SVR of Russia
24. Russian FSB director
25. Director of Russian Federal Drug Control Service
26. Director of Russian Federal Security Service
27. Head GUSP
28. The head of Hydromet (deleted order of the President of the Russian Federation from November 1, 2008 ? 654-rp)
29. The head of Rosatom (deleted order of the President of the Russian Federation from November 1, 2008 ? 654-rp)
30. Head of the agency
31. Director FSTEK Russia
32. Head of Federal Customs Service of Russia (including the disposition of the President of the Russian Federation on October 12, 2007 ? 570-rp)
33. The Director-General of the State Atomic Energy Corporation Rosatom (includes Presidential Decree of April 8, 2008 ? 460)
34. Director FSVTS Russia (including the order of the President of the Russian Federation on February 28, 2009 ? 124-rp)
